= Amagertorv 11 =

Building on Strøget, Copenhagen, Denmark

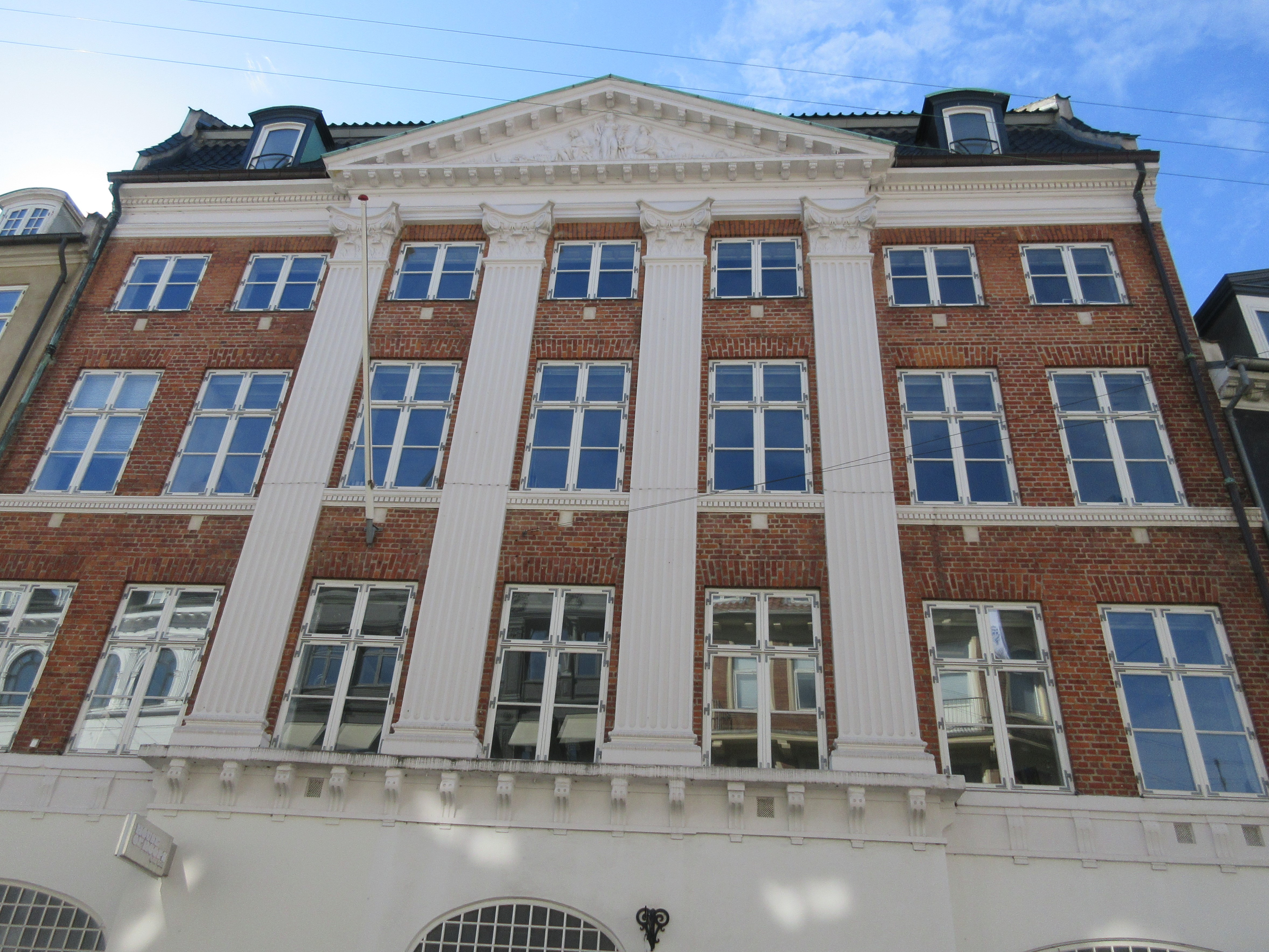
- Interactive map of the Amagertorv 11 area

General information
- Location: Copenhagen, Denmark
- Coordinates: 55°40′43″N 12°34′42.02″E
- Completed: 1798–1802
- Renovated: 1884, 1903
- Client: Danish Union of Teachers

Amagertorv 11/Læderstræde 11 is a Neoclassical property situated on the shopping street Strøget in central Copenhagen, Denmark. Constructed in 1798–1802 as part of the rebuilding of the city following the Copenhagen Fire of 1795, it owes its current appearance to two renovation undertaken in 1884 and 1903. The property was from around 1810 to 1845 owned by Gerson Melchior, owner of Moses & Søn G. Melchior. His sons Moses Melchior and Moritz G. Melchior, who would eventually continue the family firm, and Israel B. Melchior, an engineer and photographer, grew up in the building. In 1856, Melchior's heirs sold the property to wholesaler Sabinus Seidelin, whose trading firm S. Seidelin was subsequently operated from the rear wing. In 1903, S. Seidelin relocated to a new head office at Skindergade 7.

== History ==
=== Site history, 1689–1795 ===
The site was made up of two smaller properties in the 17th century. The two narrow properties continued all the way to Læderstræde on the other side of the block.

The western property was listed in Copenhagen's first cadastre of 1689 as No. 55 in Strand Quarter, owned by milliner (hatstaferer) Peter Dendas. Dendas had just acquired his property by auction. The deed was thus issued on 13 February 1689. Upon his death in 1691, the property was sold at auction to milliner Jørgen Eilersen the Elder (deed: 5 October). In 1699, it was sold by his widow Margrete Ifuersdatter to their son, merchant Jørgen Eilers the Younger (deed: 1 June). In 1704, he sold it to draper (silke- og klædehandler) Hans Henrich Saltov (deed: 11 December). He owned it until at least 1728.

The eastern property was listed in the Cadastre of 1689 as No. 56 in Strand Quarter. owned by Gert Pohlmann. Pohlmann had acquired his property some time between 1664 and 1673. After his death in 1703, it was sold by auction to milliner Jørgen Elers the Younger (deed: 1 December). His widow Florentina owned the property until at least 1829.

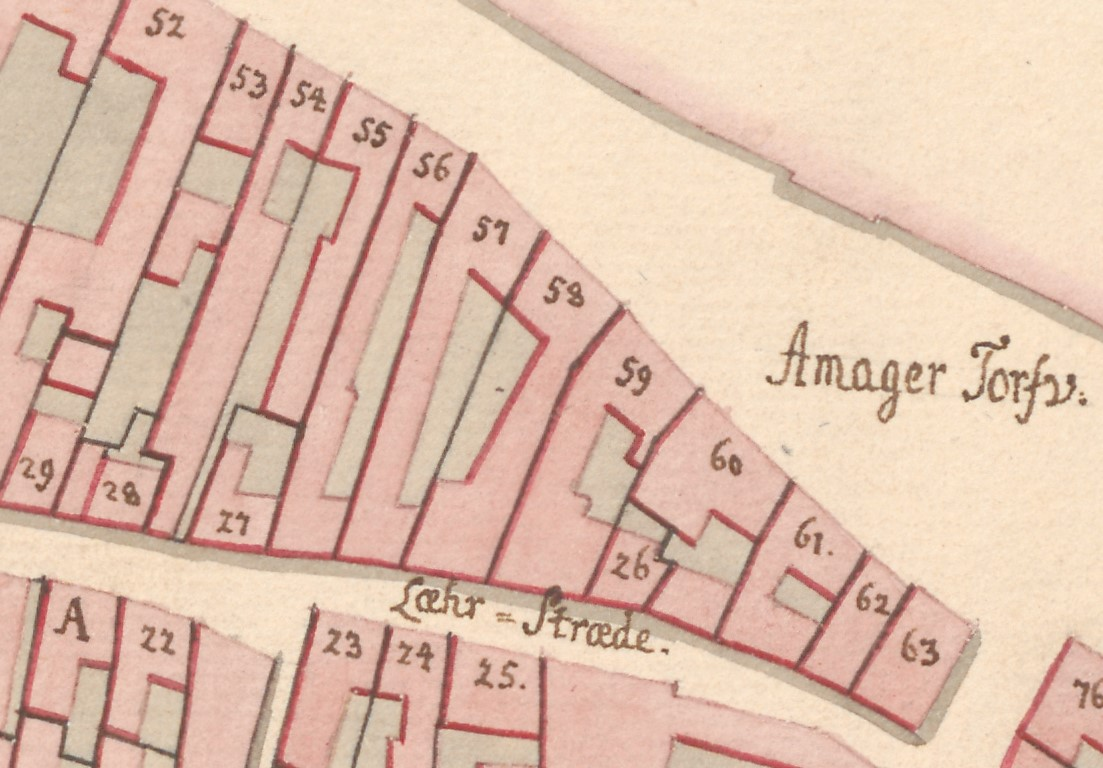
No. 46 and No. 57 seen on a detail from Christian Gedde's map of Strand Quarter, 1756

The old No. 55 was listed in the new cadastre of 1756 as No. 56 and belonged to Engelbrecht Platfues & Simon Bischof at that time. The old No. 56 was listed as No. 57 and belonged to Vilhelm and Johannes Colsmann.

Engelbrecht Platfuus (1717-1801) was the son of former colonial governor of the Danish Gold Coast Just Engelbrecht Platfusz. He had prior to that traded on Iceland. Back in 1728, he had resided in a house overlooking Christianshavn Canal (Christianshavn, No. 114). He presented an altar painting to a church in Iceland 1727.

No. 56 was home to 19 residents in two households at the 1898 census. Ludewig HenrikThomsen, a silk and textile merchant and the owner of the property, resided in the building with his wife Ingeborg Ulrica Thomsen, their six-year-old son Andreas Peter Thomsen, husjomfru Bodil Maria Thauto, two employees in his business (kræmmersvende), one apprentice, two maids and a male caretaker. Two lodgers, Ludwig Agato von Beuchwald, a lieutenant in the Royal Horse Guard with title of kammerjunker, and Johan Bollman, his servant, lived there with them as lodgers. Andreas Christian Palle, a lawyer (procurator), resided in the building with his wife Bollette Lovise, their two children (aged three and four), his unmarried sister Bollette Maria Palle, one male servant and one maid.

No. 57 was still owned by Joh.Wilhelm Colsman at the 1787 census. His property was home to eight residents in two households. The owner, who was now in his mid-60s and still unmarried, resided in the building with three maids. Severin Philip Brøseken and Died. Bernhard Brøseken, two brothers, both merchants (lræmmere), resided in the building with an employee (kræmmersvend) and an apprentice.

=== Peter Wasserfell and the new building ===
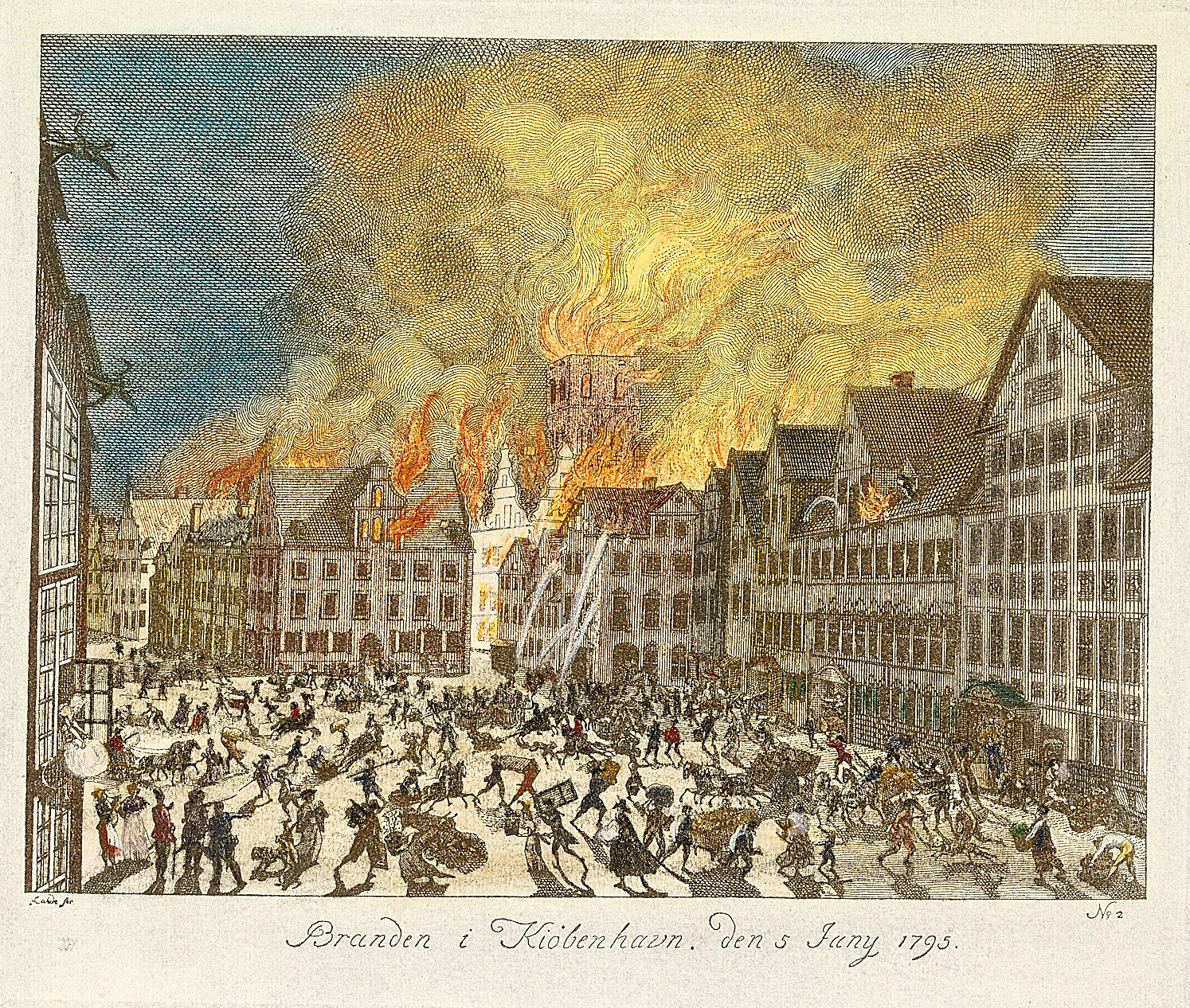
G. L. Lahde: The Great Fire of 1795 viewed from Amagertorv, No. 56–57 are located just outside the image to the right.

The buildings were destroyed in the Copenhagen Fire of 1795, together with most of the other buildings in the area. The two fire sites were merged into a single property after the fire. The present building on the site was constructed for merchant Peter Wasserfell in 1800–1802.

Although the building was far from finished at the census in 1801, on 1 February, nine residents were nevertheless registered in the property. They were no doubt residing in the basement. Peter Kaufmann, a grocer (urtekræmmer), resided in the building with two apprentices. Søren Soelberg, another grocer, resided in the building with his wife Karen Nielsdatter and their 11-year-old daughter Søren Soelberg. The last resident was clerk Christian Gude,

Peter Wasserfell's property was listed in the new cadastre of 1806 as No. 45 in Strand Quarter.

=== Melchior family, c. 1810–1856 ===
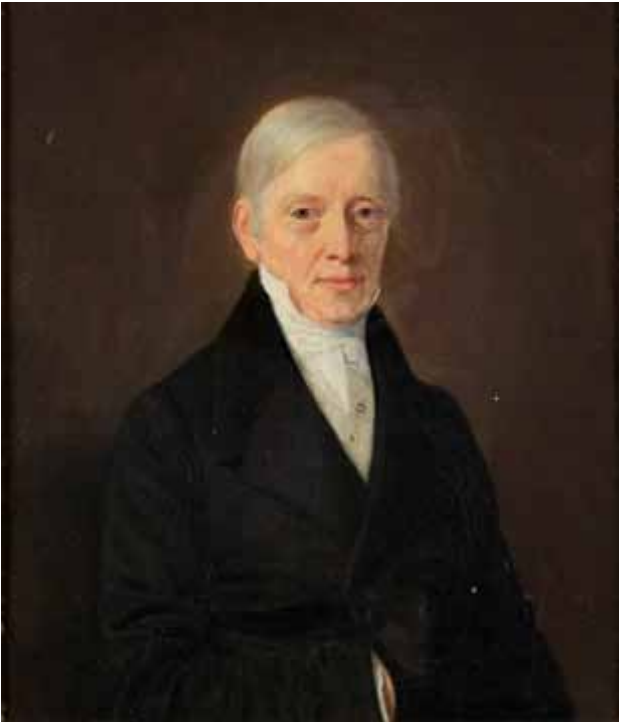
Gerson Moses Melchior (1771-1845) by Emil Bærentzen

In around 1810, No. 45 was acquired by Gerson Melchior. He was the eldest son of Moses Melchior and his partner in Moses & Søn G. Melchior- In 1813 his father's property at Gråbrødretorv 7 was also ceded to him. On his father's death in 1817, he ceded the property on Gråbrødretorv to his brothers Lazarus (1783-1859), Marcus (1761-1843) and Nathan (1763-1732), and took on the management of Moses & Søn G. Melchior.

Melchior's property on Amagertorv was home to 44 residents in seven households at the 1840 census. Melchior resided on the second floor with his wife Bergitte Melchior, their six children (aged 13 to 27), bookkeeper Berendt Nath. Persen, two male servants and three maids. Meyer Moses Goldschmidt (1789-1861), a draper (modehandler), resided on the third floor with his wife Jette Goldschmidt (née Cohn, 1794–1869), their eight children (aged four to four to 19), one male servant, rwo maids and the widow Madam Emilie Friend. The property was home to three households at the 1840 census. F. U. Lebreckt, a master furrier, resided on the ground floor with his wife Maria Magdalene, 24-year-old Peter Julius Schou and one maid. Channel Randrup. a wholesale merchant (grosserer), resided on the first floor with his housekeeper Albertine Conradi, 12-year-old Sophie Christ. Fisker, a maid and a coachman. Elias Eliesen, a master tailor, resided on the third floor of the rear wing with his wife Hanne Eliesen, their two children (aged six and nine), one employee, one servant and one maid. Ole Pedersen Dramstrup, a grocer (høker), resided in the right-gand-side part of the basement with his wife Gertrude Dramstrup, their four children (aged 10 to 21) and one maid. Christian Ammundsen, another grocer (urtekræmmer), resided in the left-hand-side part of the basement with his wife Caroline Marie, their four-year-old son and an apprentice.

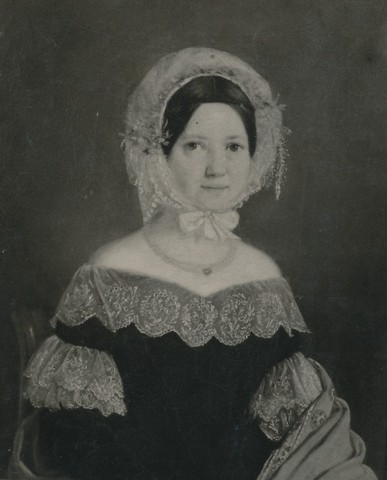
Birgitte Jette Melchior (née Israel)

The property was home to 30 residents at the 1850 census.

Moses Meyer Goldschmidt (1789-1861), a fornuture dealer, resided on the ground floor with his wife Jette Goldschmidt, their four children (aged 14 to 29) and one maid. Christian W. Petersen, a master shoemaker, resided on the ground floor with two apprentices.

Adolph H. Levin, a silk and textile merchant, resided on the first floor with his wife Hanne Bloch and their two children (aged 14 and 15) and two maids.

Birgitte Melchior (née Israel), Melchiors widow, resided on the second floor with her daughter Henriette Melchior, her sons Moses and Israel B. Melchior, a husjomfru, two maids, two male servants, bookkeeper Berend N. Peiser and Michael V. Levinsohn.

Elisabeth Christine Ibsen (née Sørensen), widow of Frederik Julius Ibsen, resided on the third floor with two daughters (aged 30 and 33), her grandson Frederik Brasen (son of J.A. Brasen), law student Hans Chr. Witte, widow Fru Clara Mann, husjomfru Caroline Louise Ørfeld and one maid.

Johan Julius Plaumüller, a master bookbinder, resided in the rear wing with his 26-year-old daughter Ch. Charlotte Amalie and an apprentice.

Ludvig Aagaard, a grocer (urtelræmmer), resided in the right-hand-side of the basement with an apprentice and a maid.

Ole Pedersen Daunstrup, another grocer (høker), resided in the left-hand-side of the basement with his wife Gertrude, their 26-year-old daughter Gine Olsen, one male servant and one maid.

=== Sabinus Seidelin ===
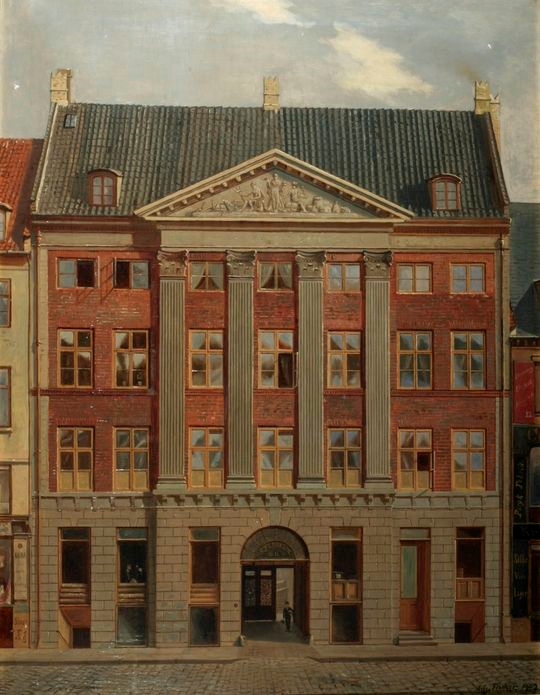
Amagertorv 11

The property was sold to the Holbæk-based businessman Sabinus Seidelin. On 29 May 1856, he relocated his company S. Seidelin to his new building. The company was initially based in a rear wing but continued to grow and soon occupied the whole building.

The property was home to 38 residents at the 1860 census. Sabinus Seidelin resided on the second floor with his wife Nicoline Seidelin, their five children (aged four to 12), two office clerks, a warehouse manager, a warehouse assistant, a nanny, a husjomfru, two maids and a coachman. Ludvig Aagaard, a grocer, resided on the first floor with his wife Charlotte Aagaard, their four children (aged one to eight), three floor clerks, one apprentice, two male servants and two maids. Adolph Levin, a silk and textile merchant, resided on the first floor with his wife Hanne Levin, their son Martin Levin (wholesaler), floor clerk Carl E. Jørgensen and two maids. Ole Pedersen, a grocer (høker), resided in the basement with his wife Gjertrud f. Sørensen, their 36-year-old daughter, one male servant and one maid. Hanne Thønnesen and William Thønnesen, two lace dealers, resided on the ground floor with one maid.

Sabinus Seidelin retired in 1884, S. Seidelin was continued by his son David Seidelin, his son-in-law Emil Hjort and long-time employee P. C. Thamsen. Seidelin and Thomsen left the firm relatively soon, leaving Hjorth as its sole owner. The property was subject to a comprehensive renovation in 1885–87.

At the turn of the century, the company had run out of space at Amagertorv 11. Holm therefore bought three old properties at the corner of Skindergade and Niels Hemmingsens Gade (then No. 43–45 in Frimand's Quarter) and charged the architect Valdemar Ingemann with the design of a new head office. The building at Skinderhade 7 was inaugurated in 1903. Amagertorv 11 was the same year subject to another renovation, possibly undertaken by a new owner.

=== Later history ===
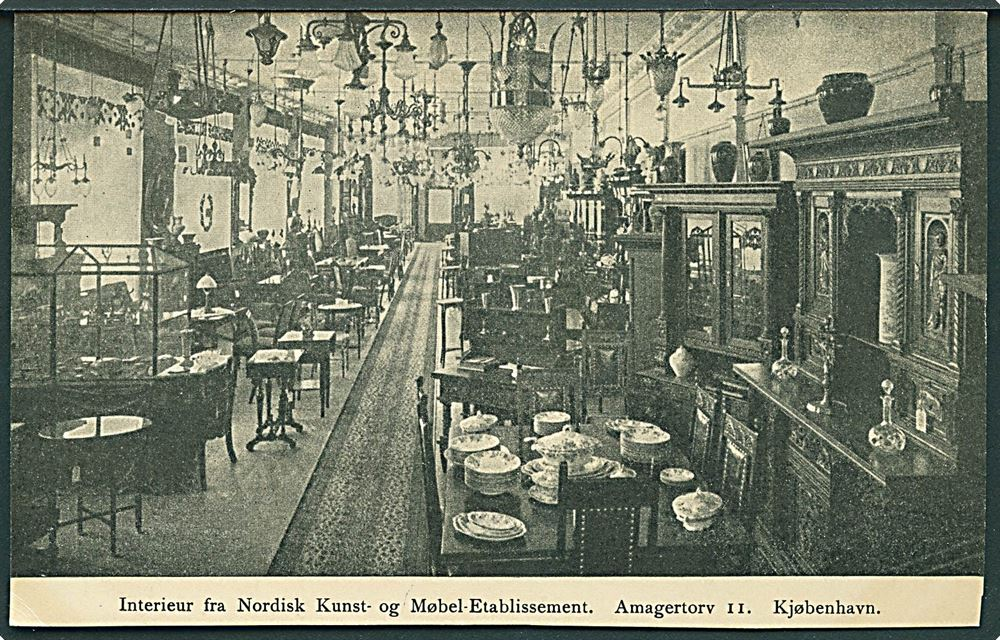
The interior of Nordisk Kunst og Møbel Etablissement

Nordisk Kunst og Møbel Etablissement, a shop specializing in furniture and decorative arts from the Nordic countries, was at some point opened in the building. It later relocated to larger premises at Nørregade 41 (the entire building).

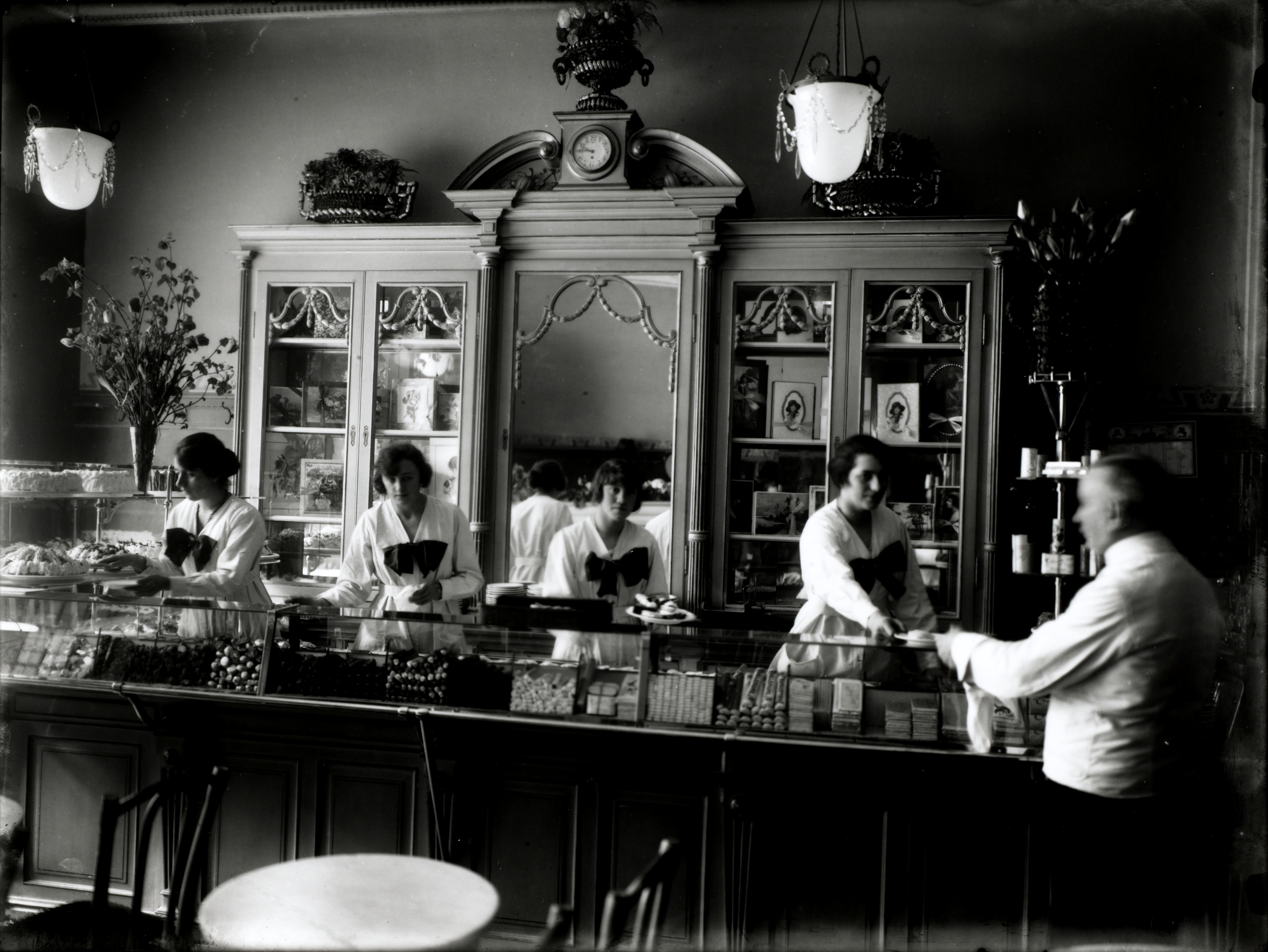
The interior of Cloetta's café in 1921

In 1913, Gaudenz Cloetta opened a café in the building. He was a relative of the three Cloëtta brothers who had settled in Copenhagen in the middle of the previous century. His café had until then been located in Hovedvagtsgade. Amagertorv 11 belonged to auction-holder R. Nielsen when he opened the café. Some time before 1921, it was acquired by Cloetta. He did not himself live in the building. He lived with his family at Købmagergade 16 at the time of the 1916 census. He later bought a house at Kollemosevej 2 in Søllerød where he died on 2 December 1925.

Sportsmagasinet, a retailer of sports gear, occupied the ground floor in 1944.

== Architecture ==
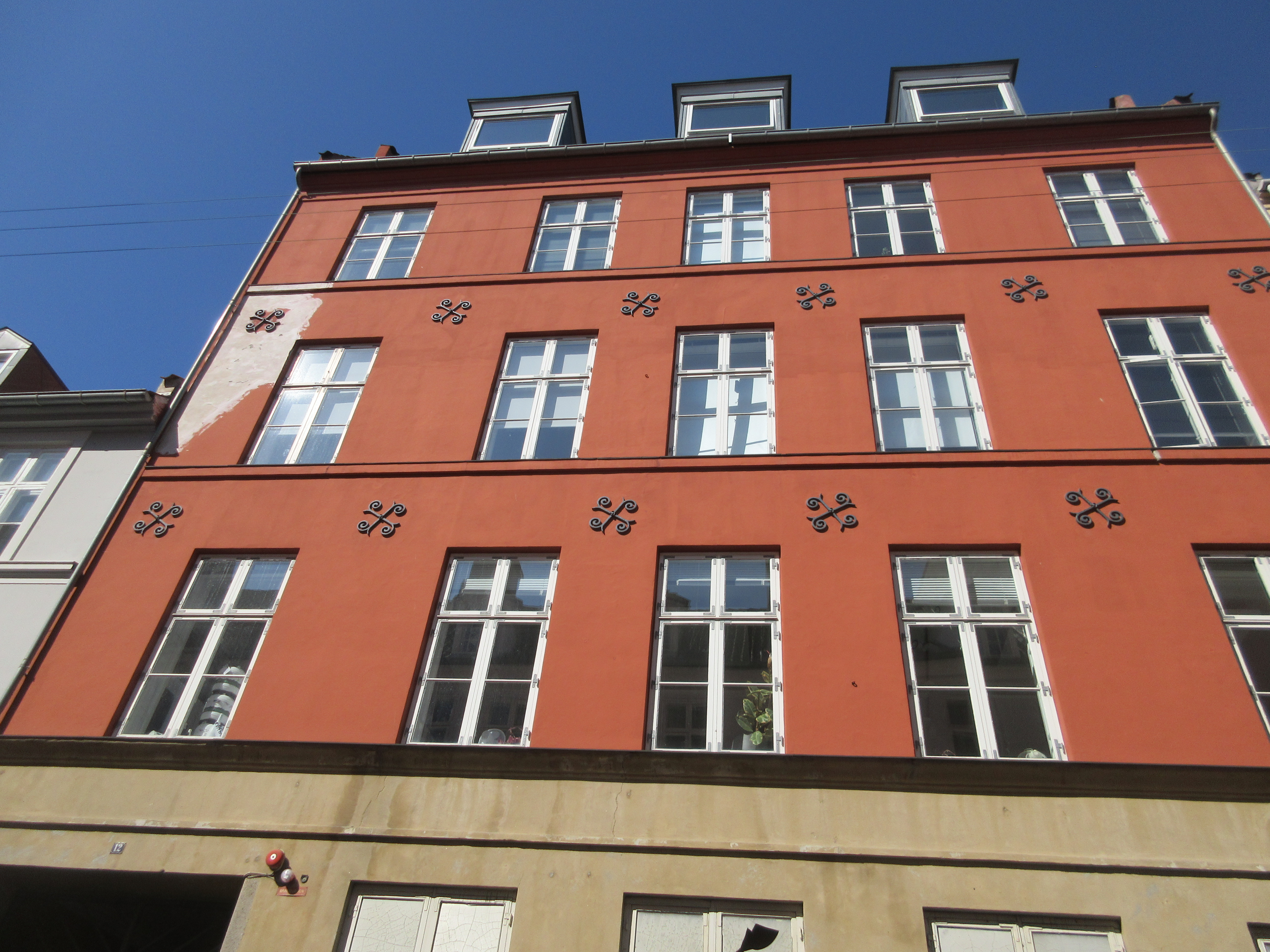
Læderstræde 12 in 2023

Amagertorv 11 is constructed with four storeys over a walk-out basement. The four central bays are adormed with giant order pilasters on the three upper floors and. They are topped by a triangular pediment. A side wing extends from the rear side of the building along the east side of a narrow central courtyard. The building at Læderstræde 12 on the other side of the block is a four bays wide, four-storey building. The most destinctive feature of the facade is two rows of ornamental wall anchors above the first- and second-floor windows. A gate in the bay furthest to the left provides access to the central courtyard. It is unclear when Læderstræde 12 was built.

== Today ==
As of 2008, Amagertorv 11/Læderstræde 12 belonged to APS Kbil 38 Nr. 1627.
