= Valdemar Ingemann =

Danish architect

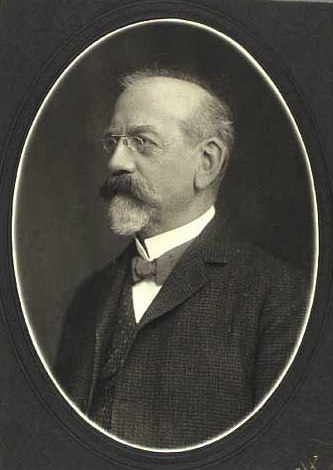
- Born: 21 February 1840; Copenhagen, Denmark
- Died: 10 October 1911 (aged 71); Copenhagen
- Occupation: Architect
- Buildings: Royal Copenhagen Porcelain Manufactury

Signature
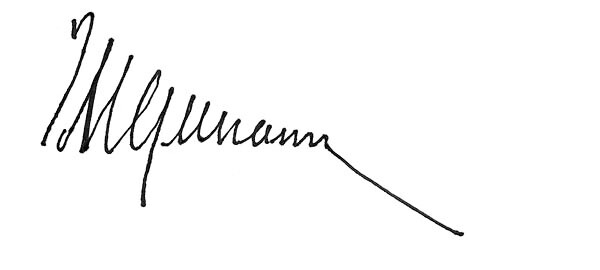

Valdemar Ingemann (21 February 1840 – 10 October 1911) was a prolific Danish architect active during the late 19th and early 20th century. His works include the Royal Copenhagen Porcelain Manufactury (now Porcelænshaven) in Frederiksberg, Copenhagen.

== Early life and career ==
Valdemar Ingemann was born in Copenhagen, the son of merchant and perfume manufacturer Søren Edvard Joachim Ingemann, nephew of the author Bernhard Severin Ingemann, and Mariane Aurelia Laurentine née Lauritzen. He completed a mason's apprenticeship and was prior to that, in October 1856, admitted to the Royal Danish Academy of Fine Arts where he won the large silver medal (1863) before graduating in 1866.

== Career ==
Ingemann worked as a draughtsman for Harald Conrad Stilling and Johan Henrik Nebelong before setting up his own practice. He taught at the Technical Society's School from 1877 to 1900, where one of his students was Vilhelm Fischer, himself later an accomplished architect at the turn of the century. Ingemann also served on the Copenhagen City Council from 1894 to 1900.

== Selected works ==
- Chapel, Assistens Cemetery, Copenhagen (1867–1868)
- Store Søvang, Køge (1874)
- Østifternes Kreditforening,, Nørre Voldgade, Copenhagen (1875)
- Luthersk Mission, Nansensgade, Copenhagen (1876)
- Aluminia later also Royal Copenhagen, now Porcelænshaven, Smallegade, Copenhagen (1882)
- Købmagergade 50, Købmagergade, Copenhagen (1884)
- Frederiksholms Kanal 4 (for Kunstforeningen), Frederiksholms Kanal, Copenhagen (1886)
- Købmagergade 44, Købmagergade, Copenhagen (1888)
- Frederiksborggade 1 (corner of Kultorvet), Copenhagen (1895, spire dismantled)
- Krabbesholm (rebuilding), Gershøj (1905)

=== In collaboration with Bernhard Ingemann ===
- S. Seidelin Building (now Pressens Hus), Skindergade, Copenhagen (1901)
- Købmandsskolen og Foreningen til Unge Handelsmænds Uddannelse, Fiolstræde 44, Copenhagen (1901–1902)
- Lyngby Søndre Mølle, Kongens Lyngby (1903)
- County hospital, Nykøbing Sjælland (1911)
- Manufakturhandlerforeningens Stiftelse, Bragesgade 26 B, Copenhagen (1909–1910)
- Nørregade 4–6, Copenhagen (1907)
- Skindergade 7, Copenhagen
- Villa Baldersbæk, Vejen Municipality (1910)

== Image gallery ==
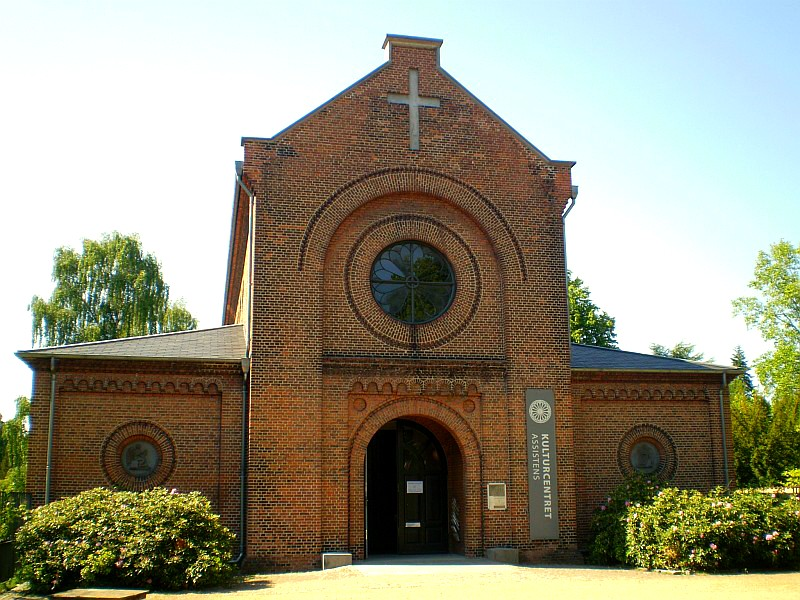
Chapel, Assistens Cemetery, Copenhagen

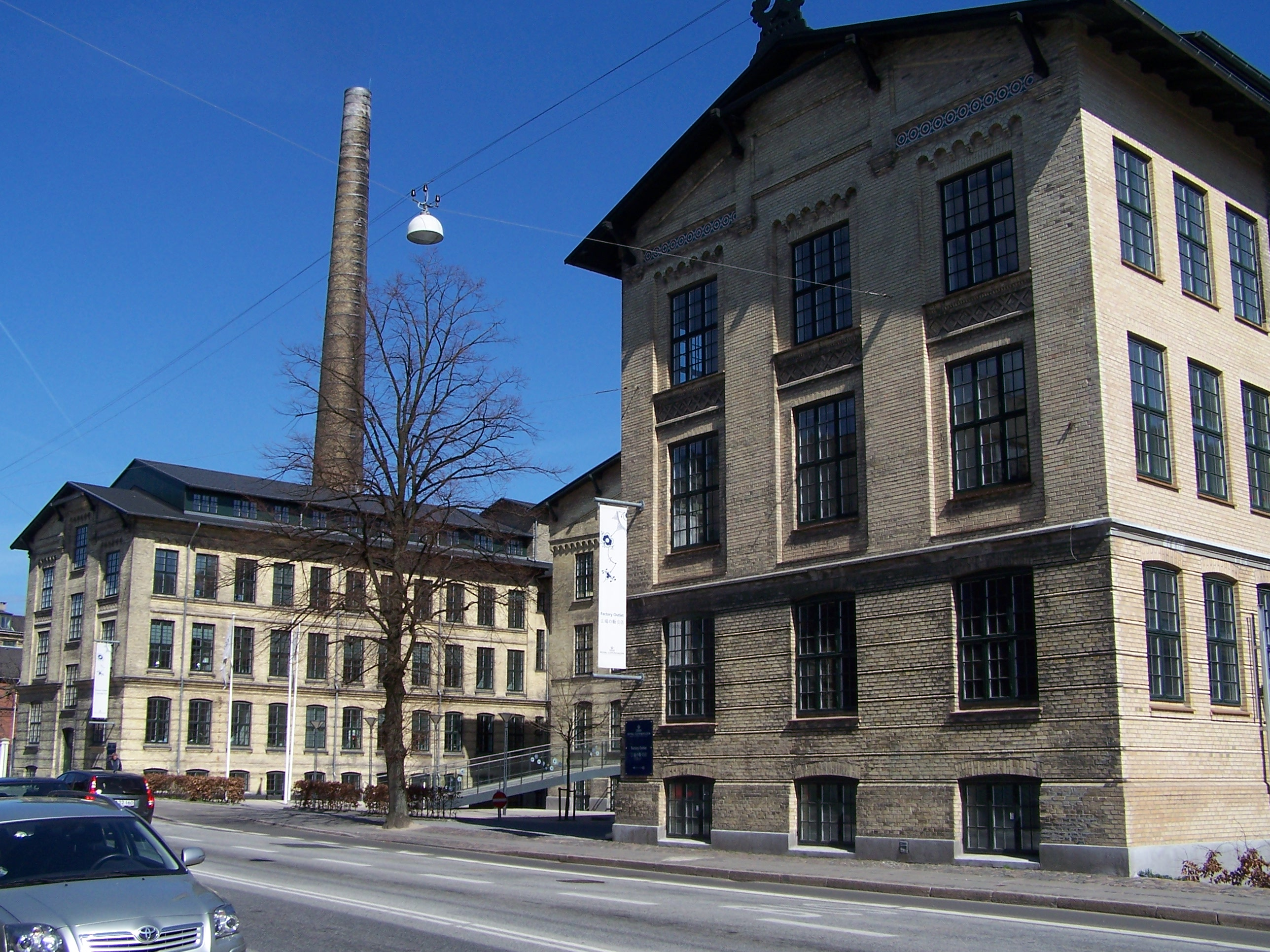
Royal Porcelain Manufactury, now Porcelænshaven, Copenhagen

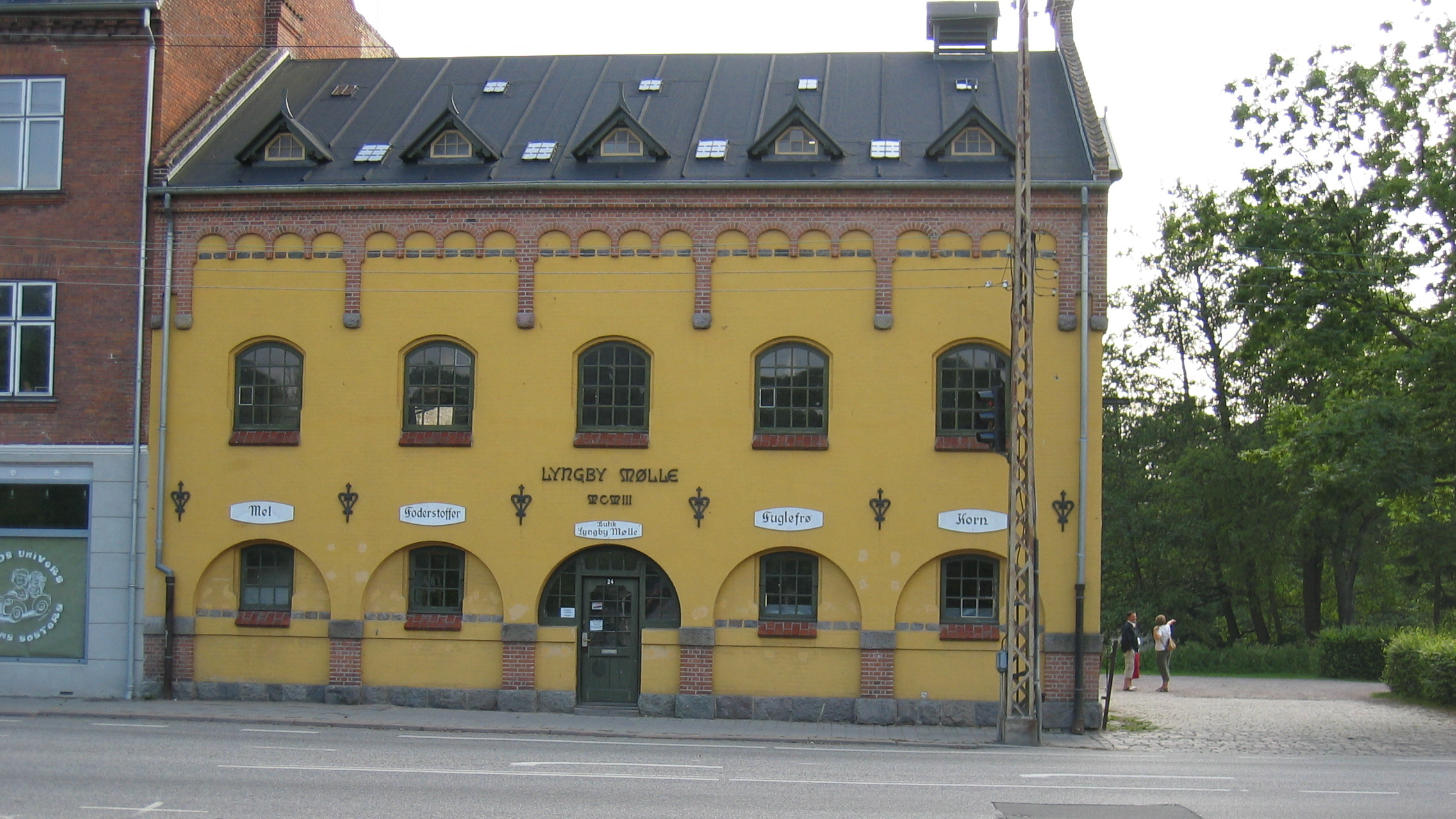
Lyngby Søndre Mølle, Kongens Lyngby

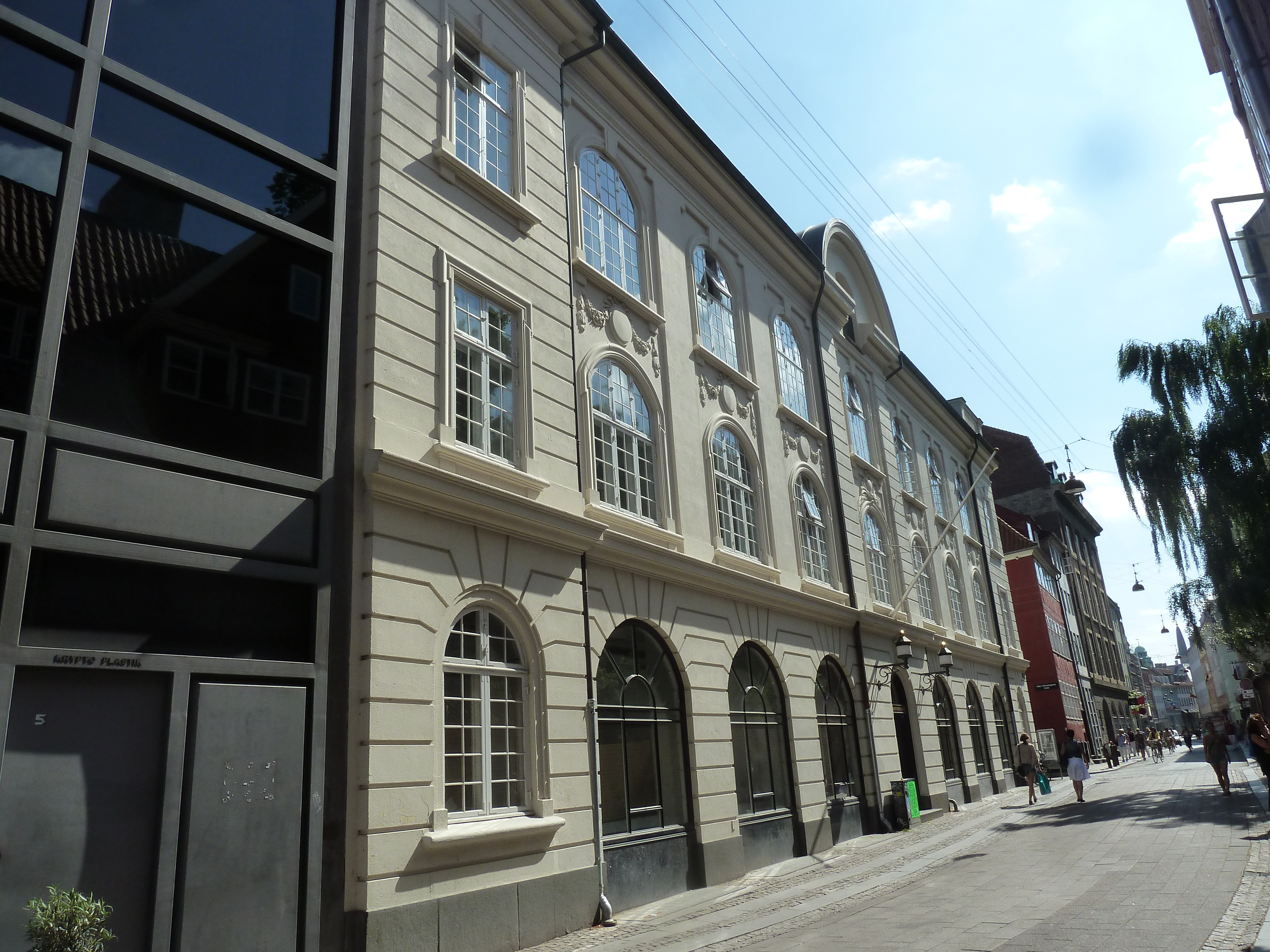
A/S Seidelin, now Publishers' House, Copenhagen

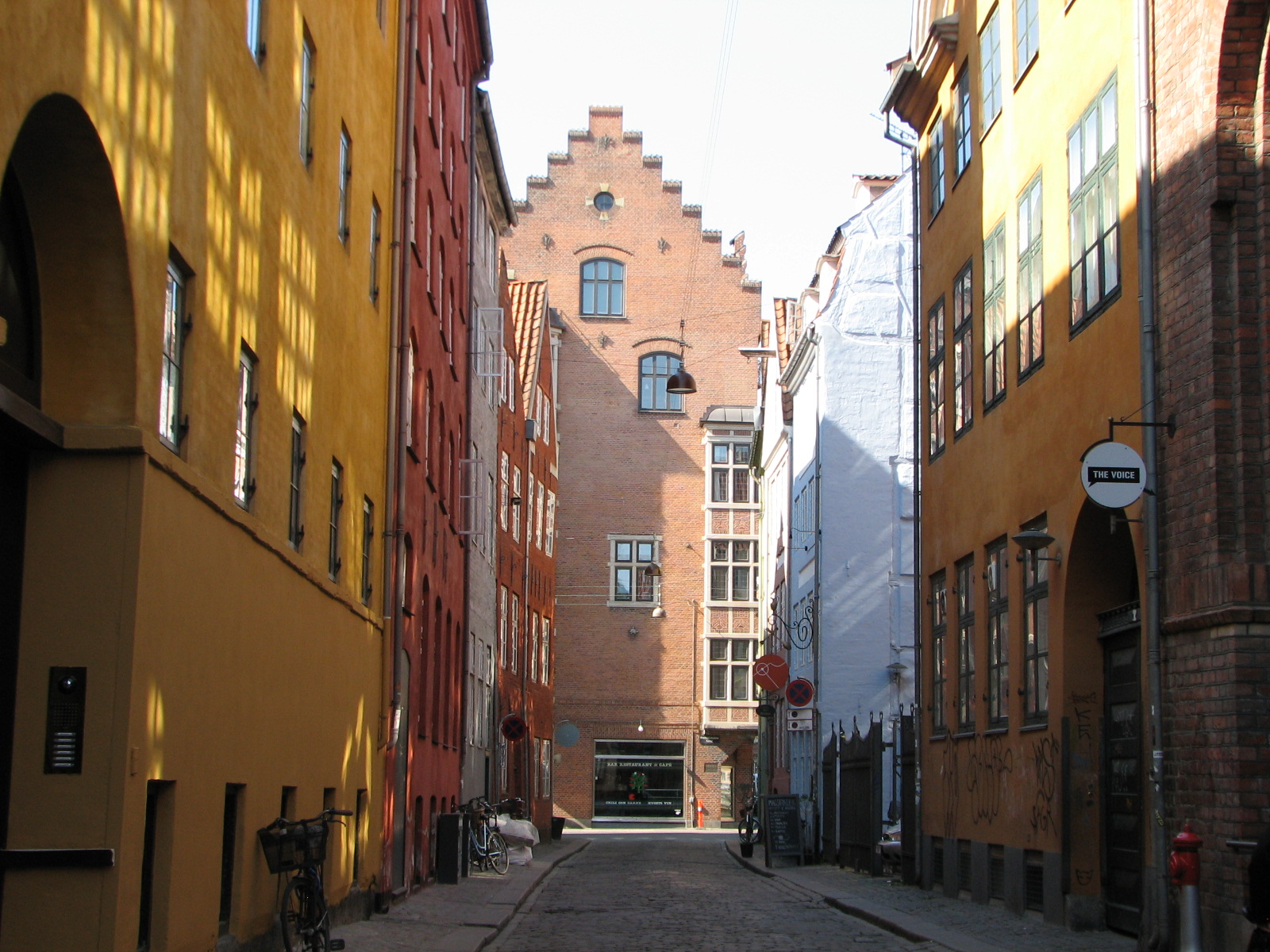
Nørregade 5–7
