= S. Seidelin =

S. Seidelin was a Danish wholesaler and manufacturer of clothing based in Copenhagen, Denmark. Its former head office at Skindergade 7, now known as Pressens Hus (House of the Press), is now home to the Danish Media Association.

== History ==
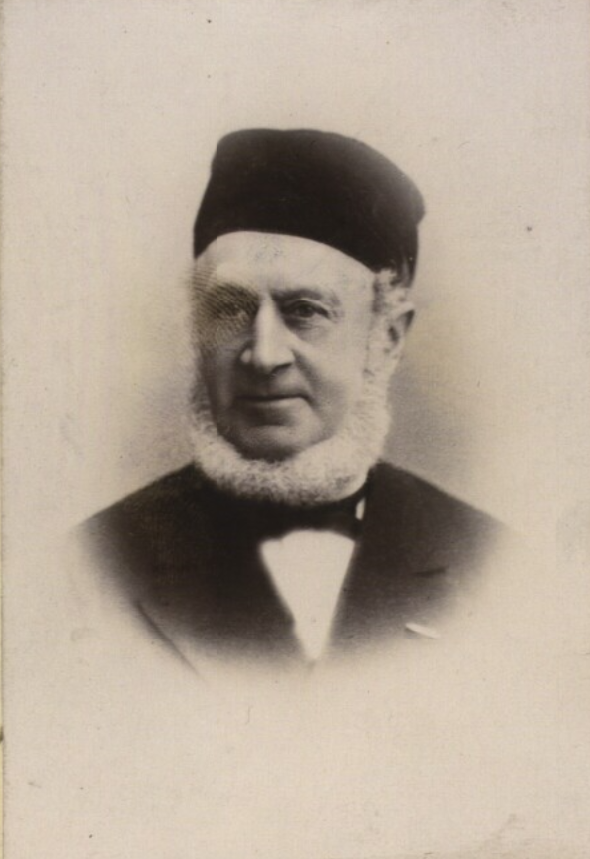
Sabinus Seidelin

The company was founded on 19 October 1843 when Sabinus Seidelin (1819-1904) opened a shop in Holbæk. His business prospered and developed into a wholesaler. On 29 May 1856, it relocated to Copenhagen where Seidelin purchased the property at Amagertorv 11. It was initially based in a rear wing but continued to grow and soon occupied the whole building.

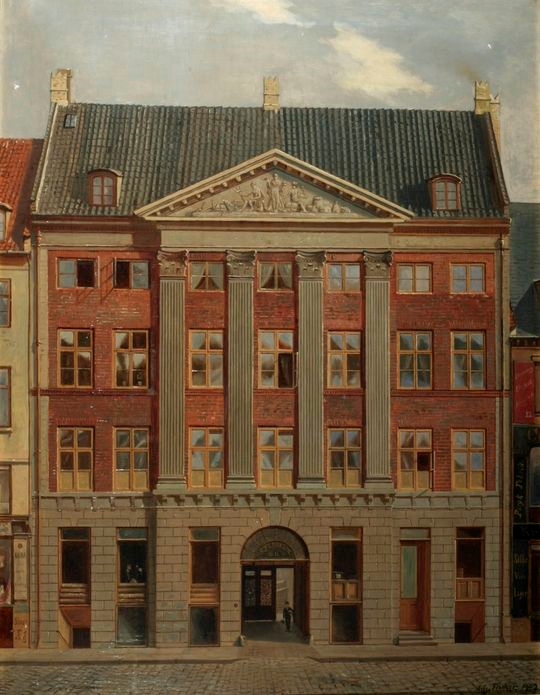
Amagertorv 11

Sabinus Seidelin retired in 1884, S. Seidelin was continued by his son David Seidelin, his son-in-law Emil Hjort and long-time employee P. C. Thamsen. Seidelin and Thomsen left the firm relatively soon,

At the turn of the century, the company had run out of space at Amagertorv 11. A new head office was completed at the corner of Skindergade and Niels Hemmingsens Gade in 1902. A new subsidiary, Augustinus & Hansen A/S, established a production of men's wear in rented premises at Laplandsgade 4 and later moved to Endrup.

The company was converted into a limited company (aktieselskab) in 1919. Inger Hjort (born 13 January 1890), Emil Hjort's daughter, was chairman of the board. The other board members were Jørgen Klerk (born 1885) and Frantz Dragsted (born 1890).

== Legacy ==
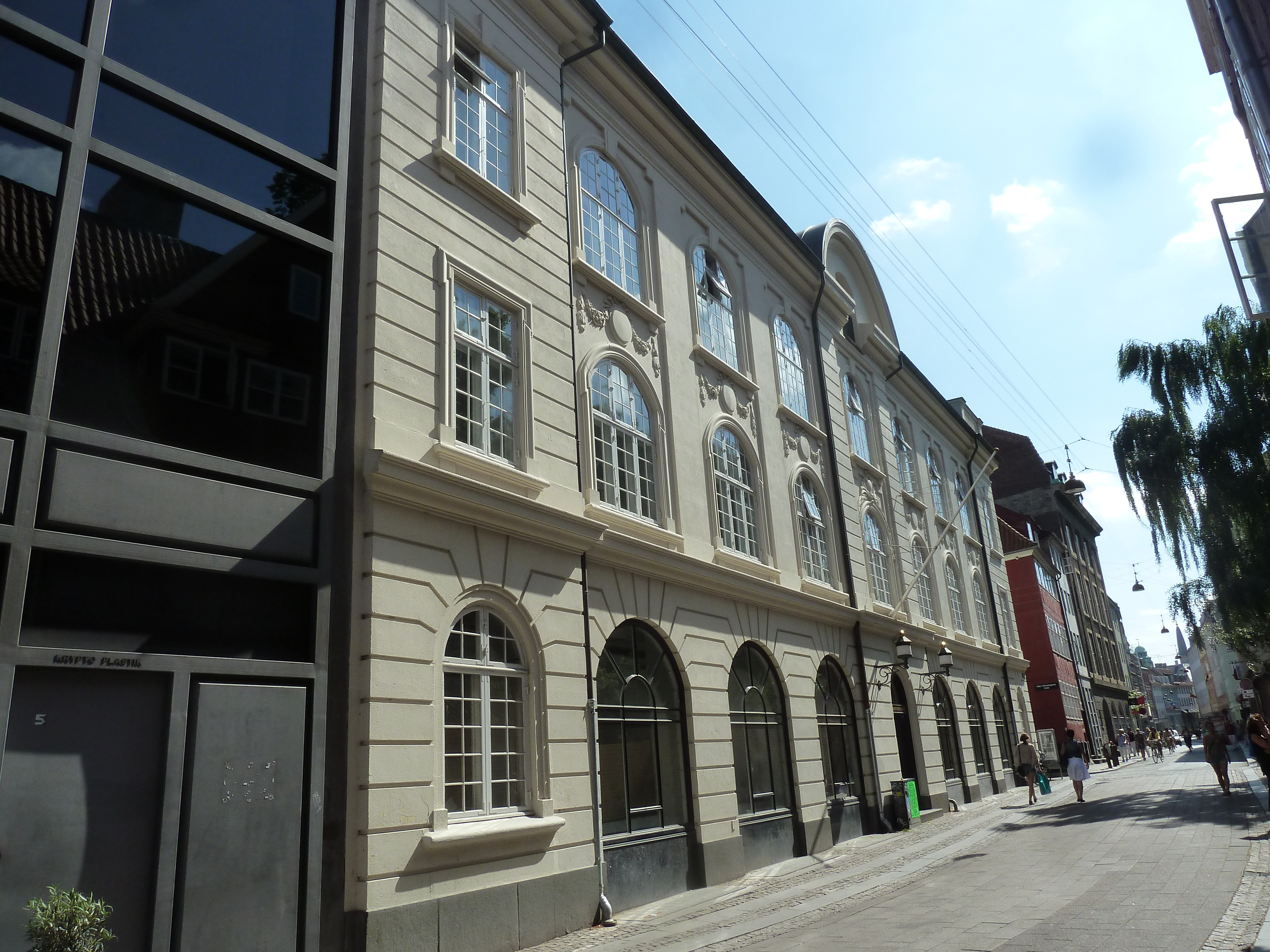
Pressens Hus

S. Seidelin's former head office is now home to the Danish Media Association. The building, which is known as Pressens Hus, was designed by Ingemann and Bernhard Ingemann. It was expanded by Erik Korshagen in 1974-1976.
