= Porcelænshaven =

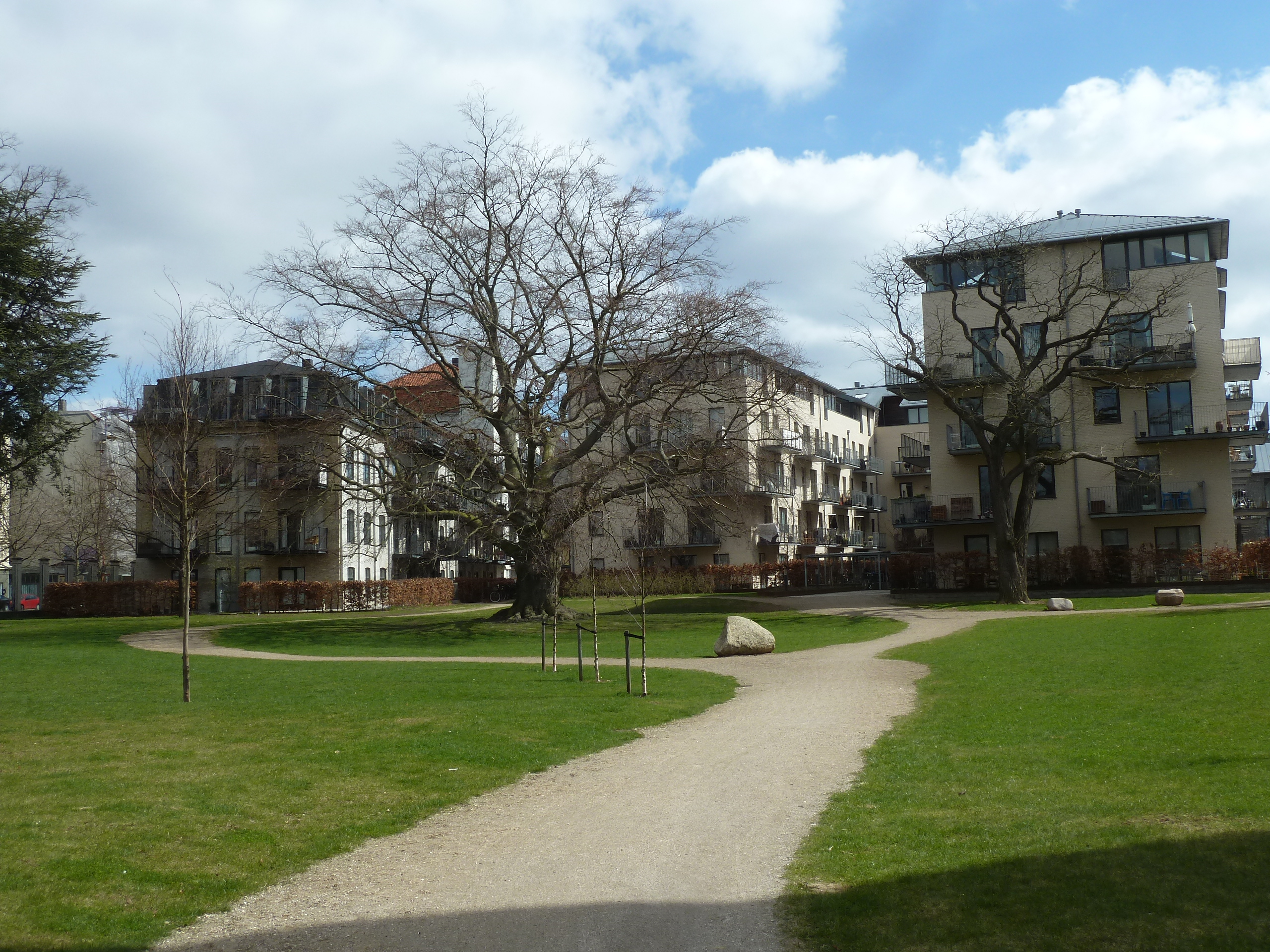
Porcelænshaven

Porcelænshaven in the Frederiksberg district of Copenhagen, Denmark, is the former premises of the Royal Porcelain Manufactury, an industrial complex dating from the 1880s which was converted into a mixed-use neighbourhood in the 2000s. Located on the corner of Søndre Fasanvej and Smallegade, adjacent to Frederiksberg Gardens, it has an area of about five hectares and consists of a mixture of dwellings, commercial space and premises for Copenhagen Business School, whose main campus is located nearby. Many of the historical buildings have been retained, including a landmark chimney and the listed director's residence from 1908.

== History ==
=== The manufactories ===
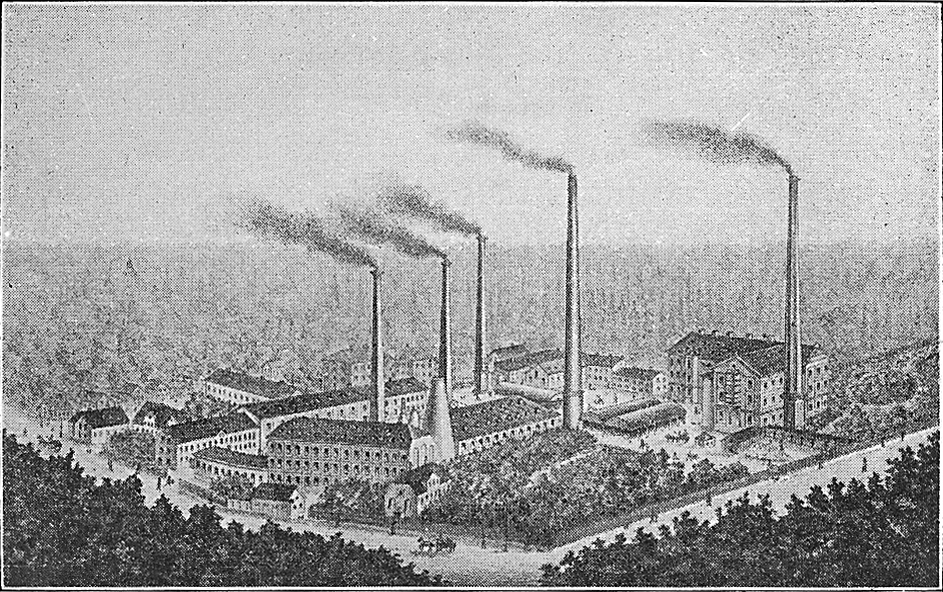
Aluminia and the Royal Porcelain Manufactury, illustration from 1888

The company E. Nobel constructed a tobacco factory at the site in 1860, but Aluminia acquired the site in 1868 to build a new faience manufactury which opened in 1870. In 1882, Aluminia purchased the Royal Porcelain Factory which was based in Købmagergade but in 1884 joined its new owner at their site in Frederiksberg.

The original factory was designed by Valdemar Ingemann. The director's house was designed by J. E. Gnudtzmann. In 1908. Anton Rosen designed a second director's residence in 1908 when the two companies get separate managements.

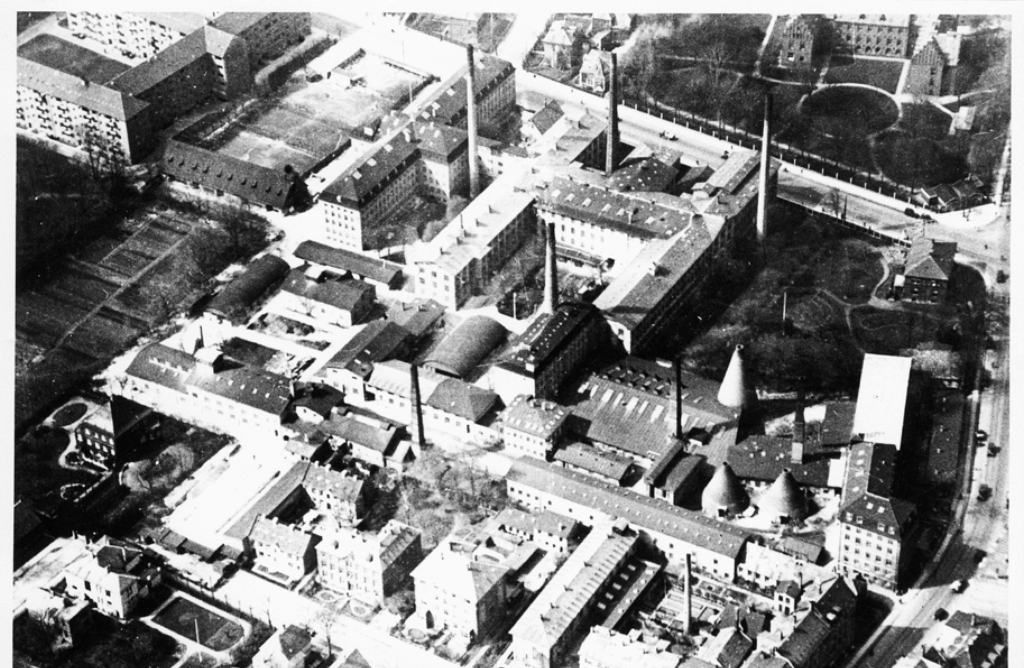
Aerial from 1925

Aluminia closed in 1969 while Royal Copenhagen continued to have their production at the site until 2004 when they moved to more modern facilities in Glostrup in the western suburbs of Copenhagen. Since then most of the production has moved to Thailand.

=== Redevelopment ===
Sjælsø Group purchased the Frederiksberg site in 2002 when Royal Copenhagen first made the decision to move. The transformation of the area was completed in 2007.

== Greenspaces and landmarks ==
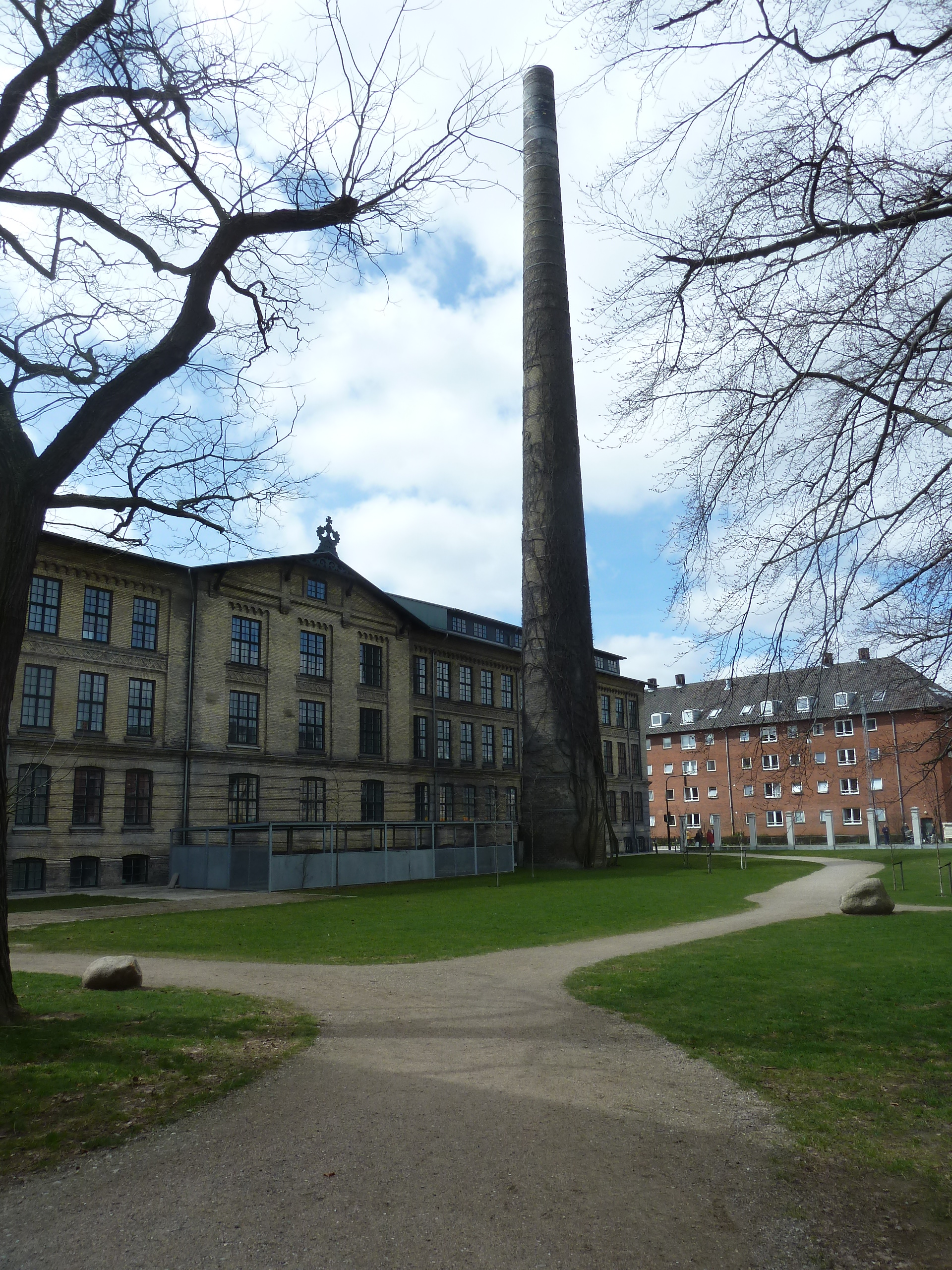
The chimney

Porcelænshaven has an area of 72,000 square metres and contains several minor green spaces. The development also has its own entrance to Frederiksberg Gardens.

Since its foundation in 1882, many trees have been gifted and planted by prominent foreign guests during their visits to the porcelain facility. The local plan for the area stresses that some of the trees are in the two highest categories of preservation value and required the developers to move them to another location in the area if they could not remain in their original place.

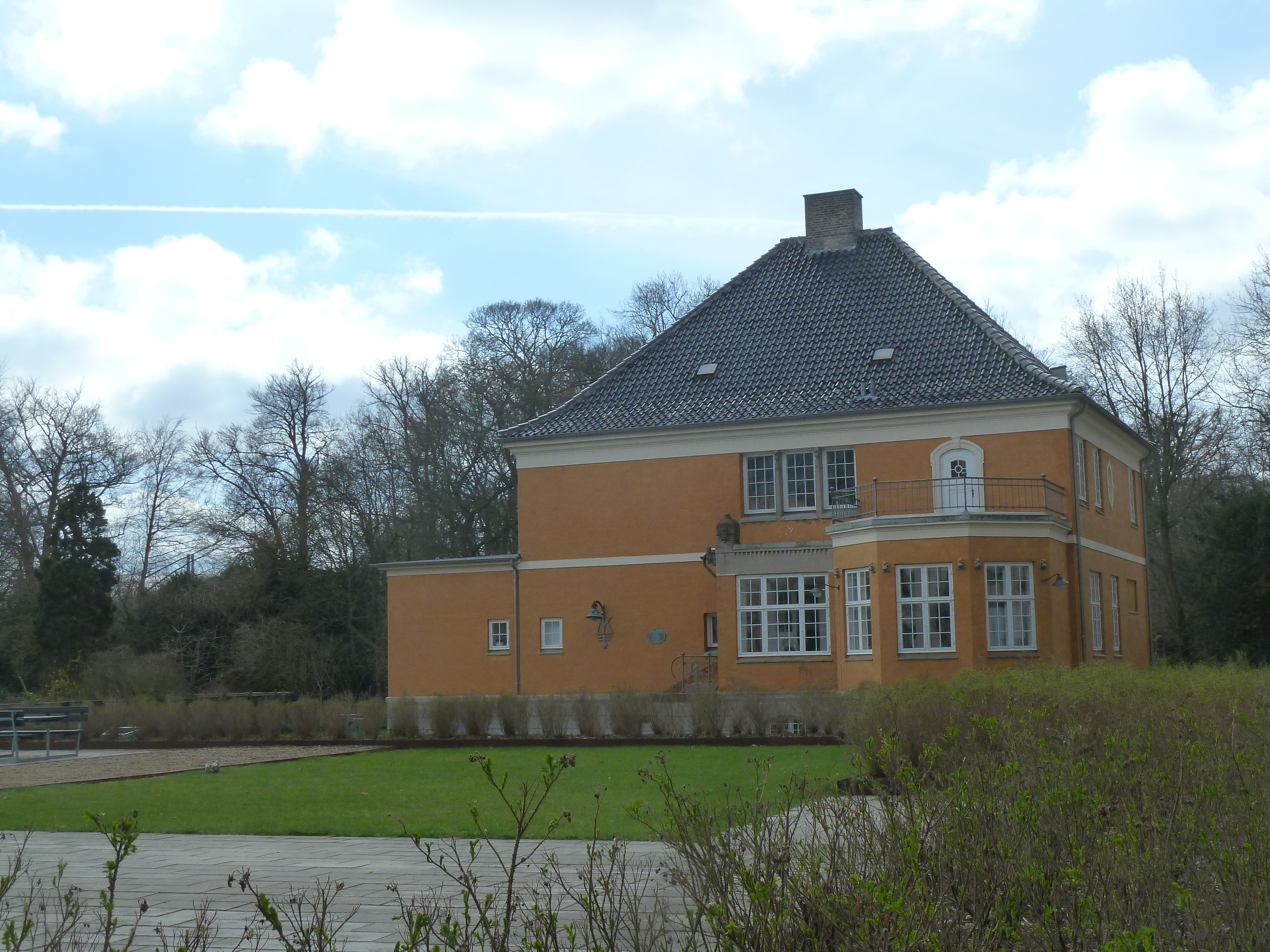
The Director's House

As many of the old buildings as possible were preserved in connection with the redevelopment. Located next to the green space at the street corner, one of the old chimneys now serve as a very visible landmark in the area. Another chimney have been retained in the rear of the area.

A former residence for the managing director of the Royal Porcelain Manufactury was listed in 2004. It was built to a Neo-Baroque design by Anton Rosen in 1905 when two manufacturies got separate managements.

== Residents ==
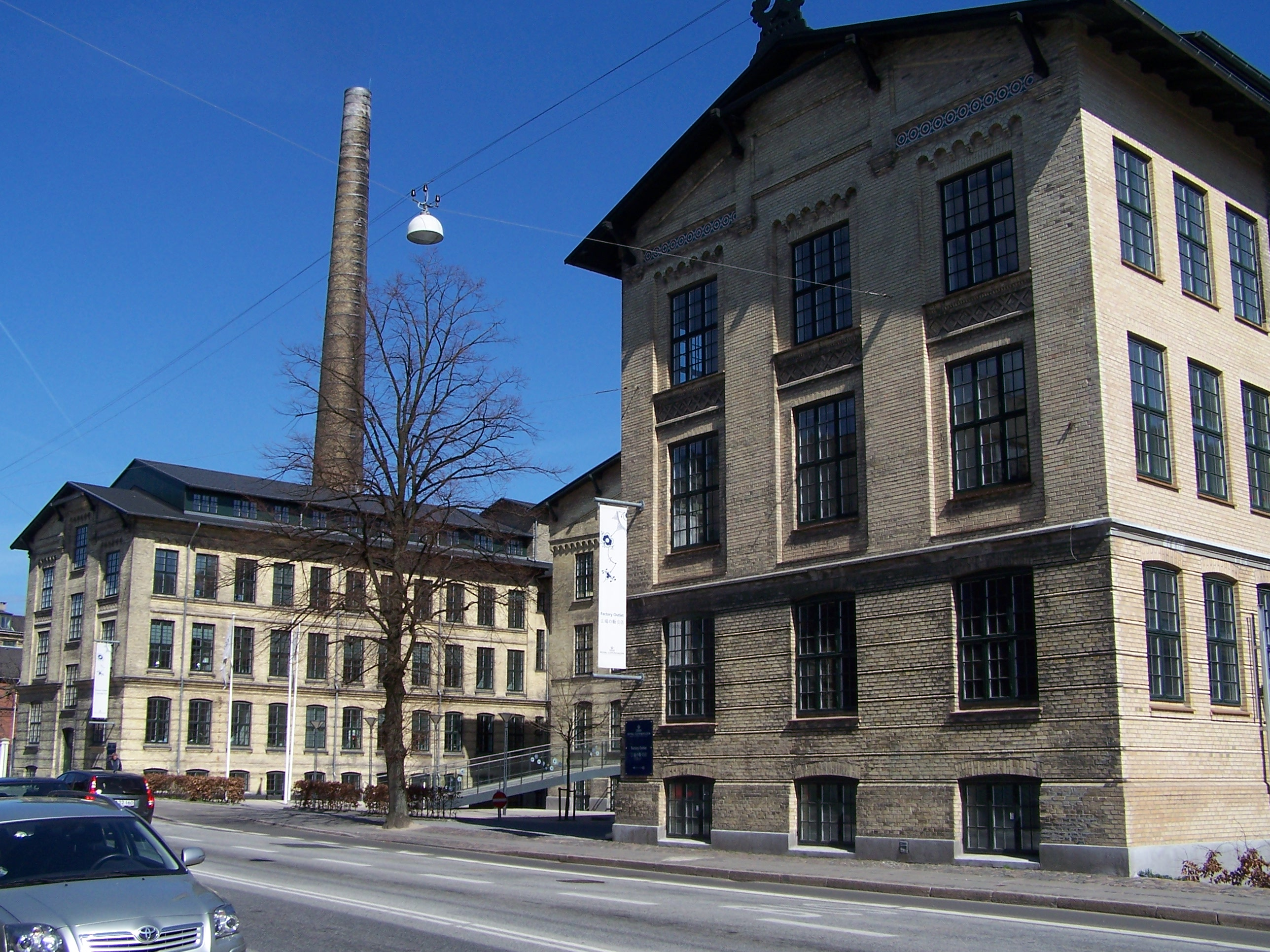
Royal Copenhagen's factory outlet at Søndre Fasanvej 9

=== Royal Copenhagen Factory Outlet ===
In some of the old buildings (Søndre Fasanvej 9), Royal Copenhagen maintains a factory outlet over two floors. It sells 2nd quality porcelain and discontinued products at special prices.

=== CBS campus ===
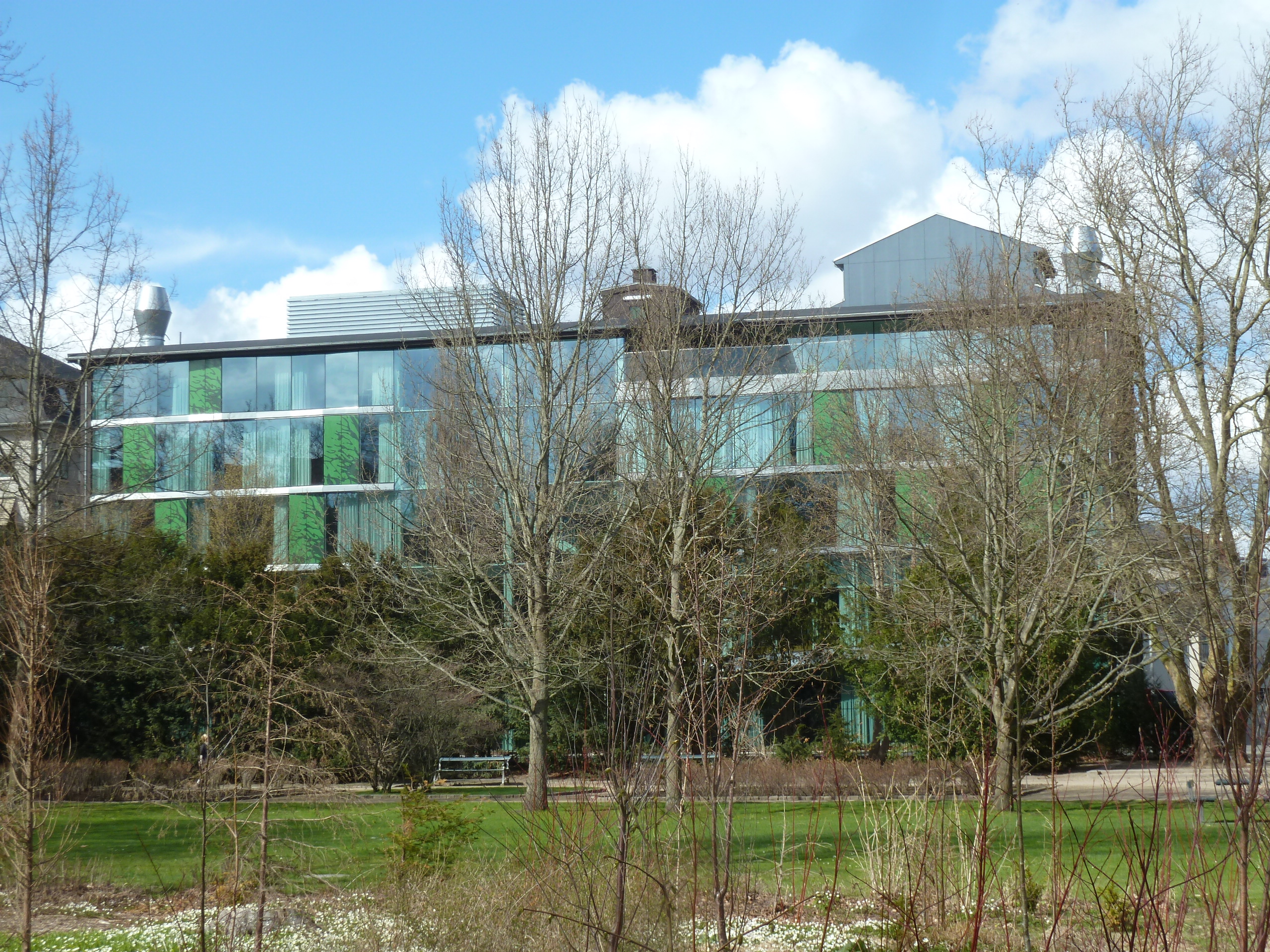
The former eaw material storage building seen from Frederiksberg Gardens

Copenhagen Business School occupies 19,000 square metres in the southern part of the area, overlooking Frederiksberg Gardens, as well as 8,000 square metres of underground parking

A low, partly underground former oven hall on Søndre Fasanvej serves as a vestibule to a complex of former factory buildings. It is roofed by three barrel vaults supported by pillars. The building to the south contains residences for international students and a canteen. The building to the north contains class rooms and IT facilities. Behind the complex is another building which home to Department of Intercultural Communication and Management and the Department of Management, Politics and Philosophy. Another building, further to the east, is a former raw material storage building which was adapted to its present use by Henning Larsen Architects after they won an architectural competition in 2006. It has retained its industrial character on three sides but has a glazed façade facing the park. It now contains flexible study environments. The former Director's House is also used by CBS.

=== Dwellings ===
Several architectural firms contributed to the area. Juul & Frost has designed Flora Danica House (44 housing society dwellings), Fasanhaven (83 owner-occupied apartments), Porcelain House (24 owner-occupied apartments), Magnolia Houses (10 three-storey townhouses), student housing (120 units of 25–49 sqm) and premises for Georg Jensen/Royal Copenhagen. Arkitema has designed Fajance Haven (73 owner-occupied apartments).

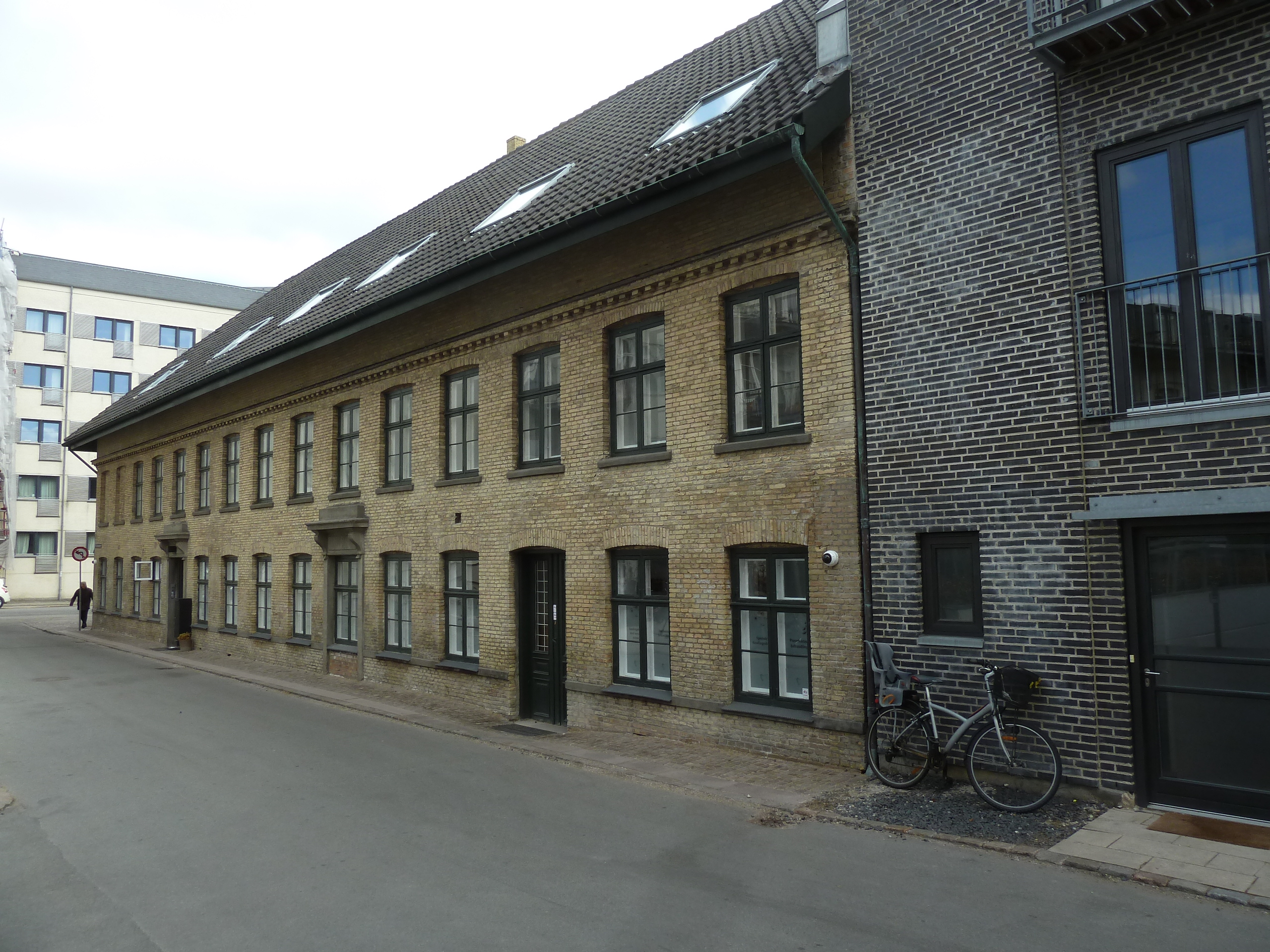
Old building

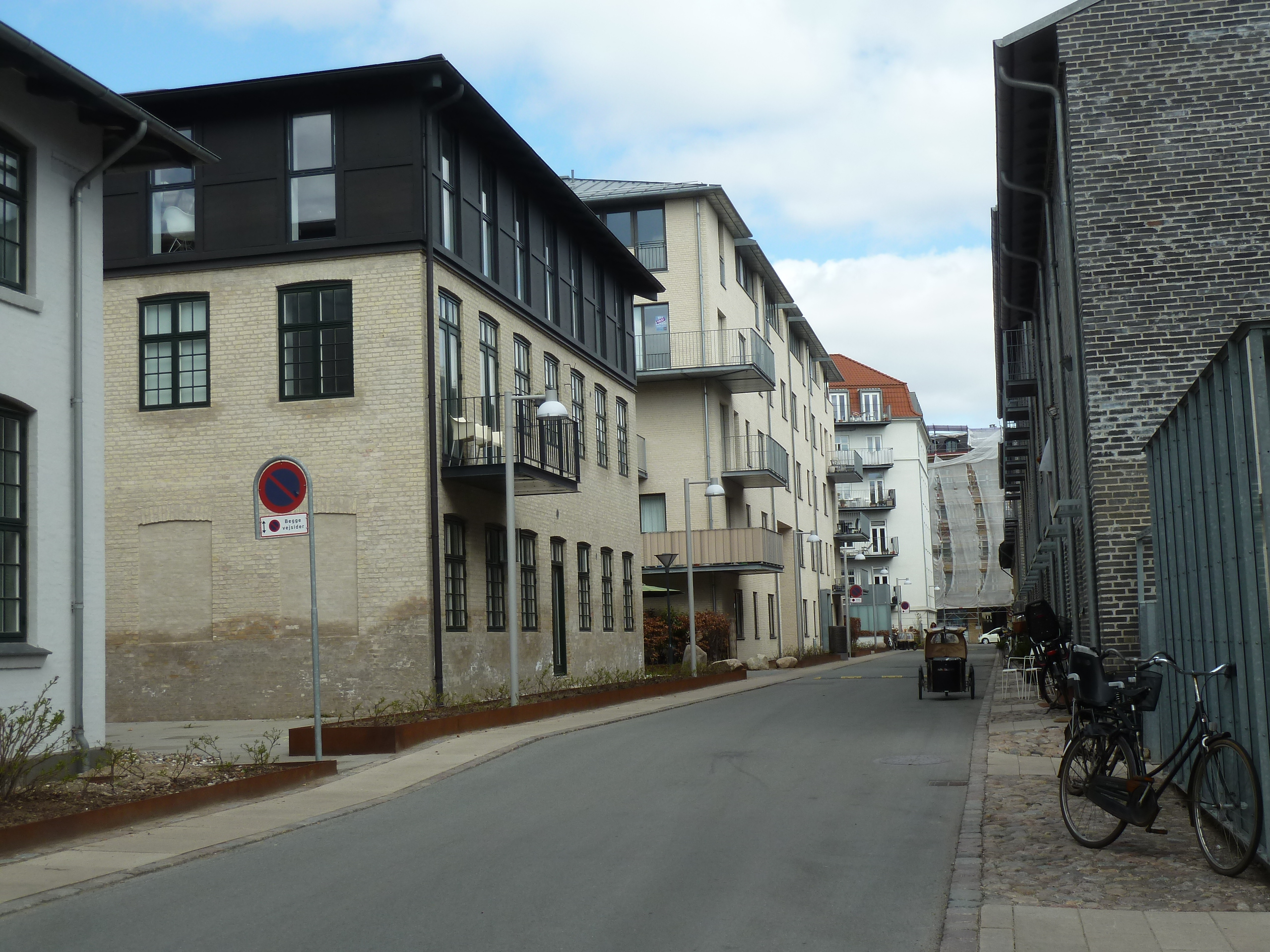
Buildings

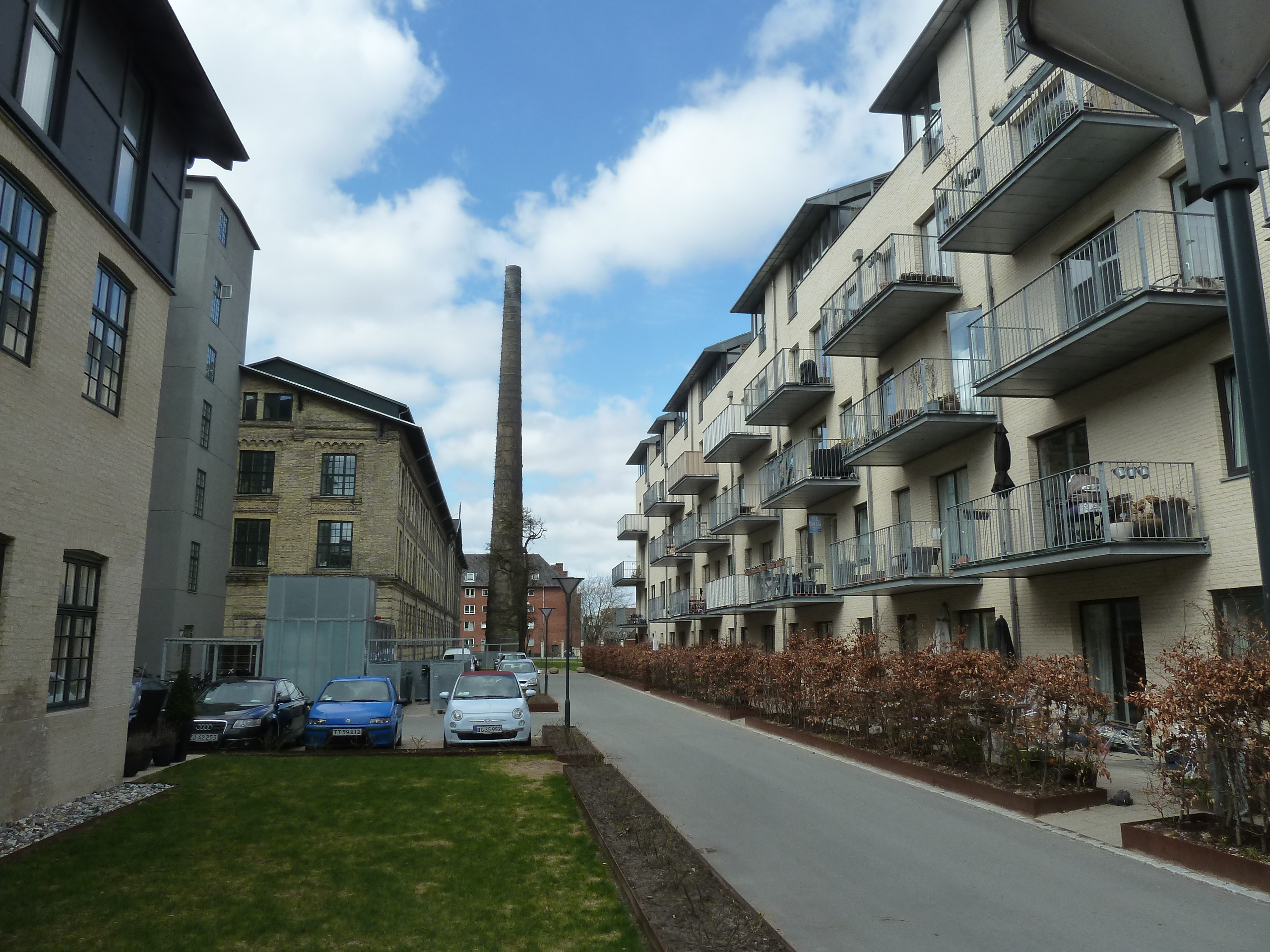
Fasanhaven (right)

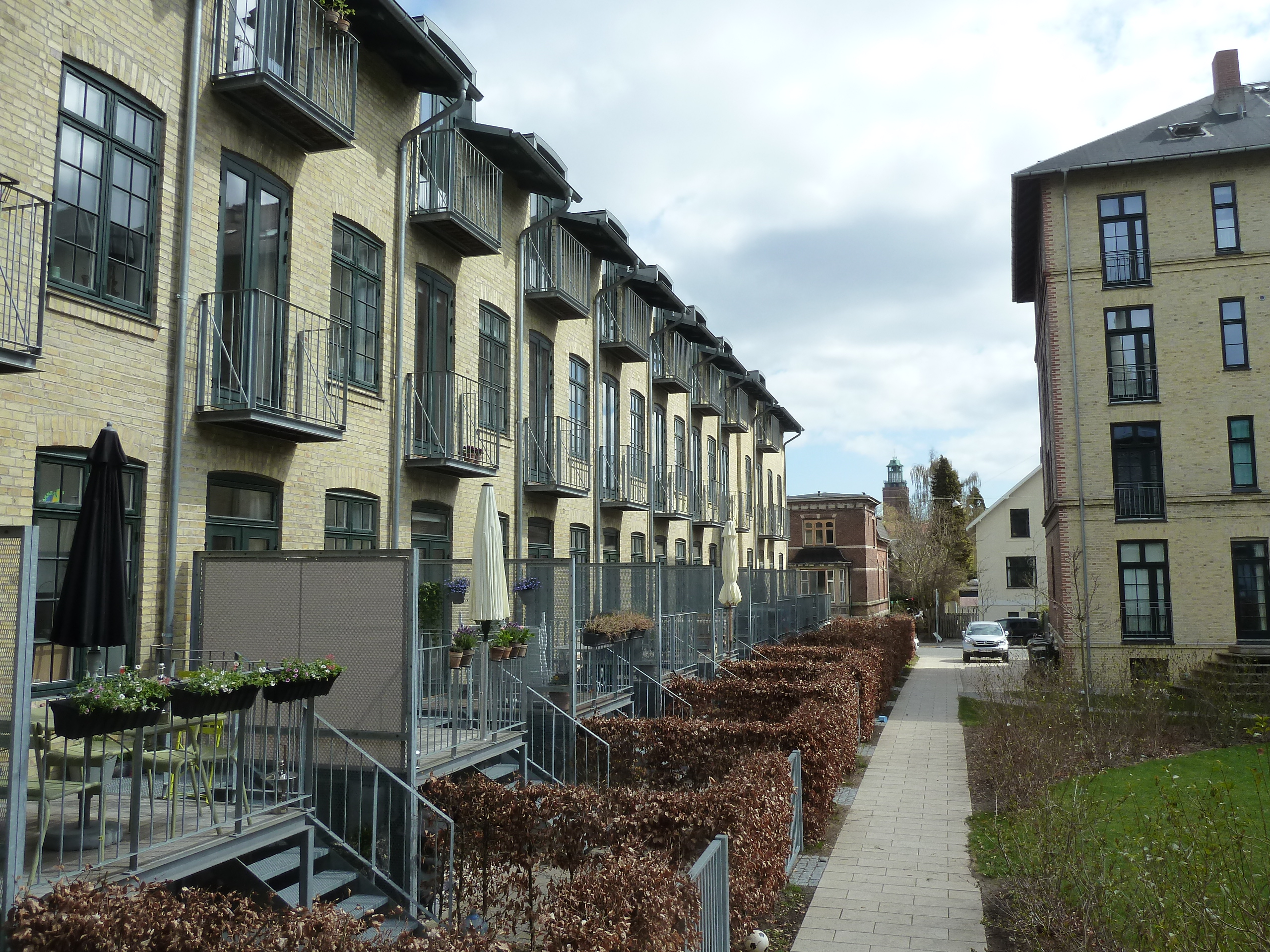
Magnolia House
