= Vilhelm Fischer =

Danish architect (1868–1914)

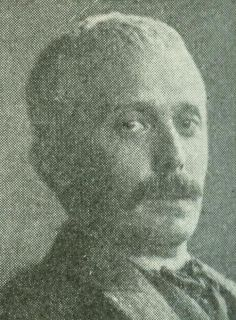
- Born: 26 January 1868; Holbaek, Denmark
- Died: 14 April 1914 (aged 46); Frederiksberg, Denmark
- Occupation: Architect
- Buildings: Holbaek Town Hall; Absalons Gård; Nordic Life Insurance Company Building; Technical School, Roskilde

Signature
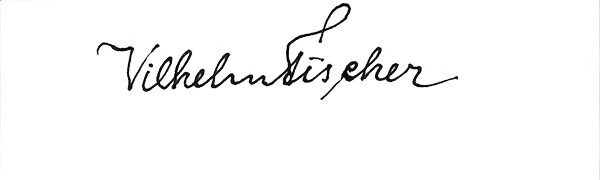

Peter Frederik Vilhelm Fischer (Holbaek, 26 January 1868 — Frederiksberg, 14 April 1914), was a Danish architect. He was a designer of buildings associated with the artistic movement of National Romanticism that swept through Germany and Scandinavia at the turn of the twentieth century.

== Life and career ==
Fischer was born to Peter Joachim Fischer, a master tinsmith, and Antoinette Oline Carlslund, in Holbaek, due west of Copenhagen on the Inderbredning, an inlet of the Kattegat between Denmark and Sweden. He studied drafting with the industrial architect and engineer Valdemar Ingemann before attending the Københavns Tekniske Skole for two terms between 1883 and 1886. Fischer was admitted to the Royal Danish Academy of Fine Arts’ School of Architecture in Copenhagen in September 1885 and studied there until his graduation in January 1892. While still a student, he worked in the office of Albert Jensen, from 1887 to 1894.

In 1895, Fischer moved to the office of Martin Nyrop, taking over as the chief supervisor of the works for Copenhagen City Hall (1891–1901), Nyrop's most important commission, leaving the office in 1902 upon the building's completion. While still in Nyrop's employ, in 1901, he won the architectural competition for a new building on Copenhagen's City Hall square, now known as the Hotel Bristol, completed in January 1903. After 1895, he also embarked on several study trips abroad, to the Netherlands, Belgium, and France, but spent the most time in Germany and Italy. He exhibited his work at the prestigious annual Charlottenborg Spring Exhibition in Copenhagen in 1896, 1898, 1899, 1901–03, 1905, 1908, 1910 and 1911.

In independent practice, Fischer was most active in his native Holbaek, but also in Roskilde and Copenhagen proper. He is best known for his work on Holbaek's new Town Hall, which also serves as the local courthouse and prison (1909–11). In his brief career, which lasted barely 15 years, he became proficient in a great variety of building types, from apartment houses and villas to schools, hospitals, corporate headquarters, shops, government buildings, and hotels. He was awarded a gold medal by the Royal Danish Academy for his design for a parliament building in 1898, along with the academy's Kaufmann prize in 1903. One of his last commissions, the new offices (1913–14) of the Nordisk Livsforsikrings-Aktieselskab (Nordic Life Insurance Company) won a prize from the city of Copenhagen. He also participated in several architectural competitions; winning, in partnership with Christian Sylow, second prize in the competition for the reconstruction of Christiansborg Palace in 1905, behind Mørk-Hansen and Carl Brummer.

Fischer married Vilhelmine ("Minni") Cathrine Sophie Schumacher (Roskilde, 15 April 1871 – 2 February 1941) in Roskilde on 17 September 1895. She was the daughter of master brick mason Hermann Christian Louis Schumacher and Anna Marie Agathe Hansen.

== Works ==
- Holbæk private secondary school (1897)
- Summer house, Øresundsvej 10, Hornbæk (1897, rebuilt)
- Villa, Lemchesvej, Hellerup (together with Harald Harpøth 1898–99)
- Allehelgensgade 2, Roskilde (1898–99)
- Pavilion, Holbæk Beach Park (1899)
- Hotel Bristol, later Absalons Gård, Rådhuspladsen 45, Copenhagen (1901–02, 1st prize, awarded by the Municipality of Copenhagen 1903)
- HC Ørsteds Vej 50B, Frederiksberg (1903, together with Christian Sylow )
- Budtz Müllers Eft.s Art Shop, Bredgade 29, Copenhagen (1904)
- Tibberupgård, Humlebæk (1904–05)
- Justice Councillor Witte and Wife Foundation, Farimagsvej 24, Næstved (1905–07)
- Wholesaler Jacob Holmblad's villa Strandlund at Charlottenlund Fort (1906–07, demolished 1973)
- Købmagergade 64, Copenhagen (1906–07)
- Villa for carpenter H. Schledermann, Taffelbays Allé 11, Hellerup (1907)
- Henrik Steffens Vej 1–7 and 2–6 (Gammel Kongevej 148 and 150), Frederiksberg (1907–08)
- Retirement home, Skt. Pedersstræde and Skt. Olsstræde, Roskilde (1907–08)
- Town hall, courthouse and prison in Holbæk (1909–11)
- Technical School, Absalonsgade, Roskilde (1911)
- Barracks and garrison hospital, Helligkorsvej 7, Roskilde (1911–12; barracks rebuilt after fire in 1913)
- Vestergade 23–25, Copenhagen (1911–13)
- Villa, Lindevej 10, 4300 Holbæk, (1913)
- Nordic Life Insurance Company building of 1897, Grønningen 17, Copenhagen (1913–14, awarded by the Municipality of Copenhagen, completed by NPP Gundstrup)

== Gallery ==
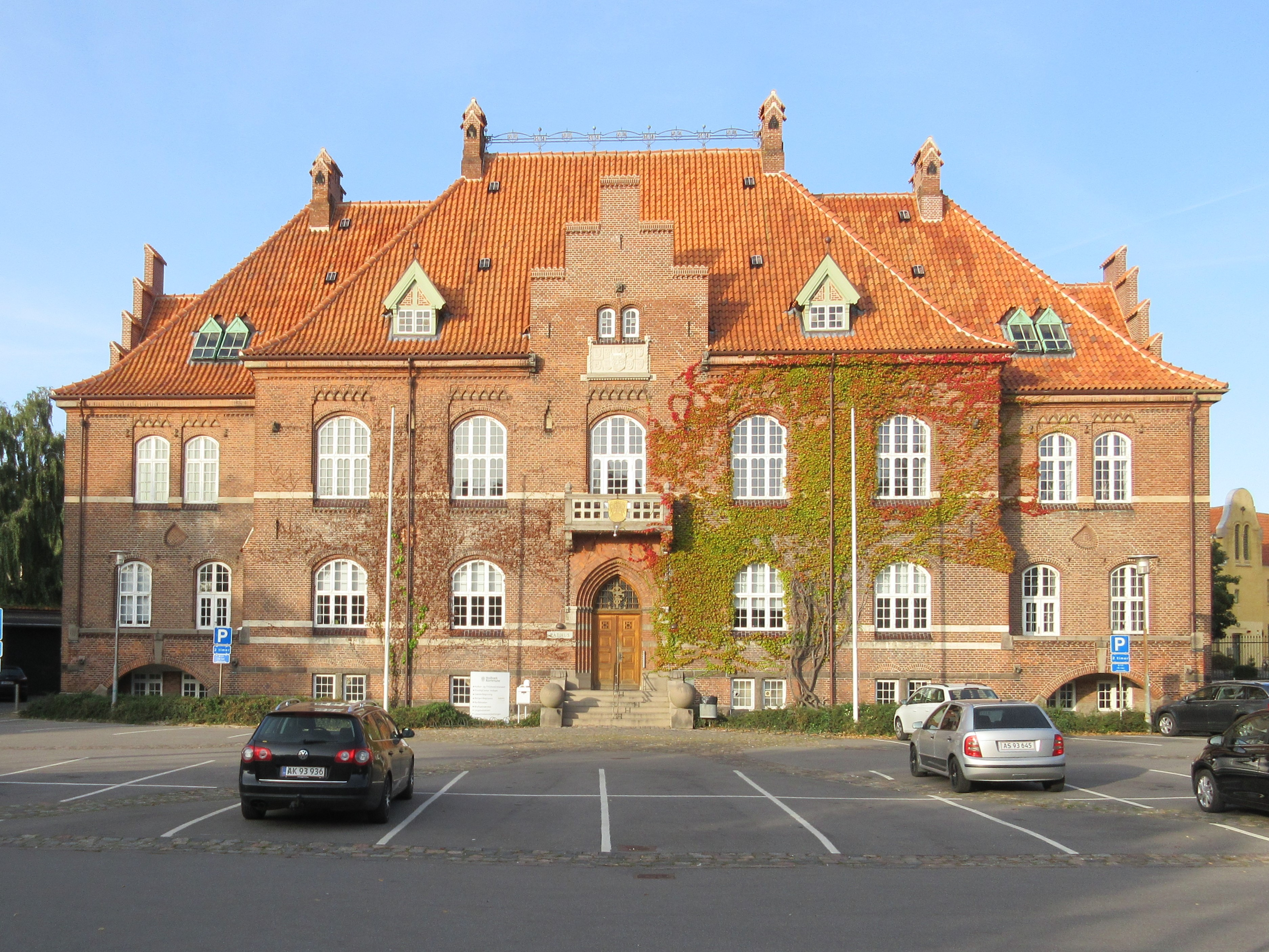
Holbaek Town Hall

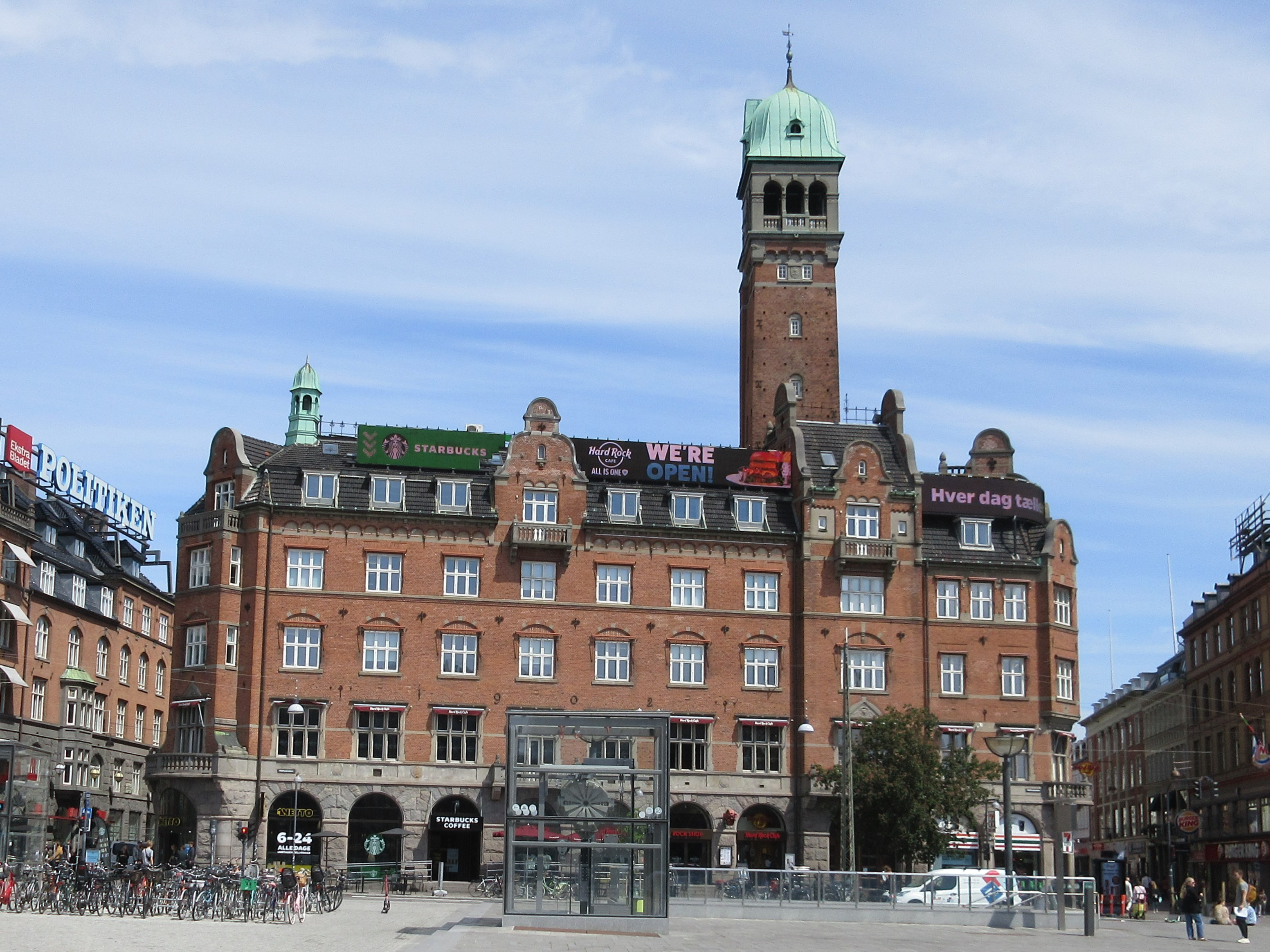
Absalons Gård, Copenhagen
