= Pressens Hus =

Building in Copenhagen

Coordinates: 55°40′50″N 12°34′33″E

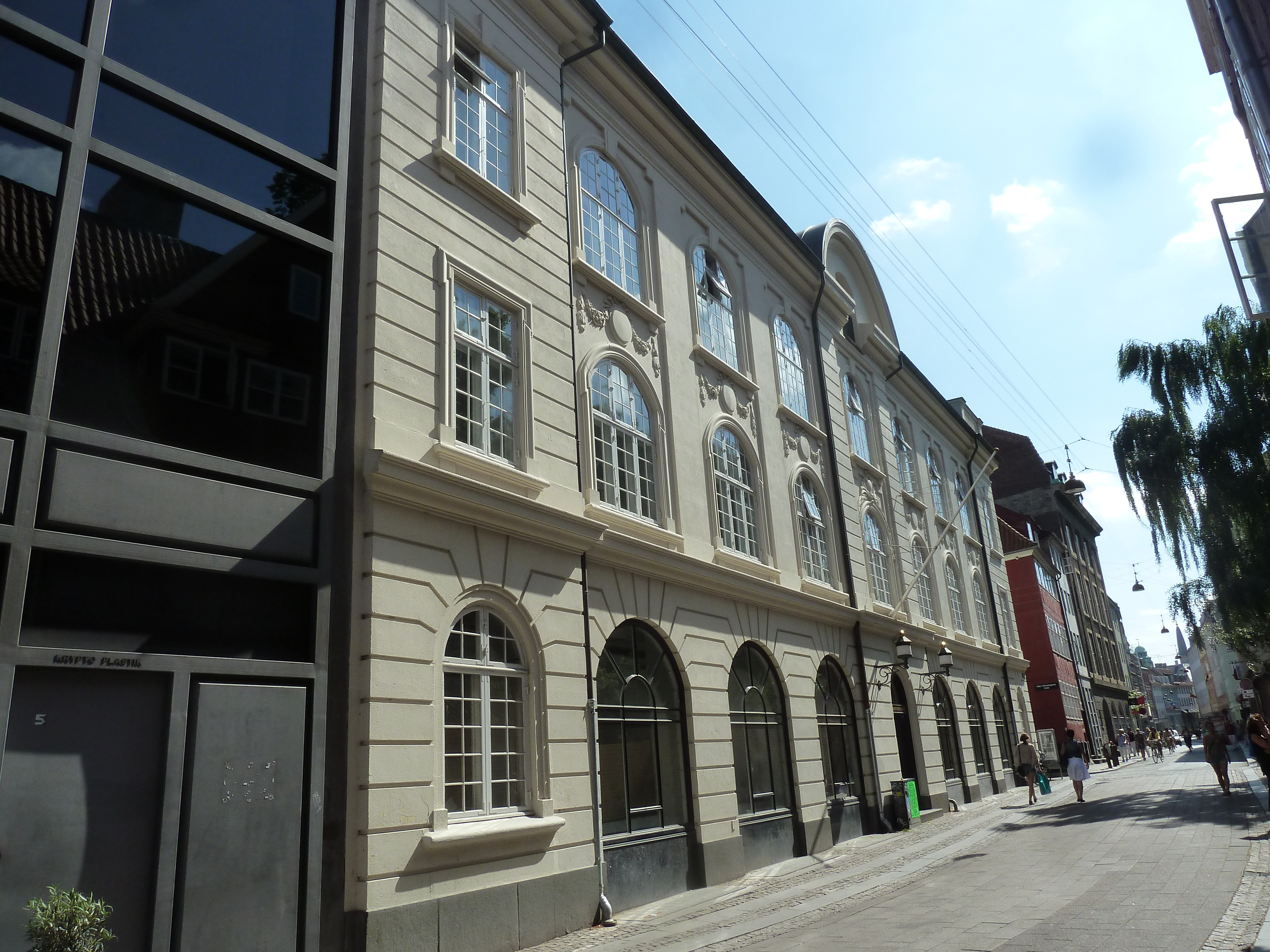
The old part of Pressens Hus

Pressens Hus (lit. 'Publishers' House'), home to the Danish Media Association, a membership organisation body representing printed and digital media industry in Denmark, is situated at Skindergade 7 in central Copenhagen. The building consists of a former commerce house from 1903 (No. 7) and a Modernist infill extension by Erik Korshagen from 1976. which was listed in 1992.

== History ==
The old part of the building was built for Emil Hjort (1843–1924) as a new home for his trading house, S. Seidelin, which had outgrown its premises on Amagertorv. The new building wasdesigned by Valdemar Ingemann and Bernhard Ingemann (1869–1923) while P. Gram was responsible for its construction.

The building was acquired by Pressens Fællesindkøb. In 1973, needing more space, they acquired the neighbouring building, a house from 1730. It was demolished and replaced by a modern infill built from 1974 to 1976 to a design by Erik Korshagen. A number of artifacts were in connection with the work retrieved from the site, in an old well which had been covered in 1868, including porcelain from the East Indies, glass with Frederick V's coat of arms, long Dutch clay pibes and a pocket watch in a case of turtle shell.

In June 2007, Danske Mediers Arbejdsgiverforening acquired the building for DKK 87 million. In November 2018, it was sold to a property company owned by the founders of Rekom.

== Architecture ==
The modern infill is built in a narrow site of just eight metres width. The building fills the entire lot, thereby raising the courtyard space to its rear. It is a concrete structure covered with a glazed curtain wall which is slanted on the rear side. The dark-painted steel frames of the glass panels are asymmetrically placed, creating a composition remniscient of Piet Mondrian's paintings.

The modern extension was listed in 1992. It was described as a fine example of the integration of contemporary architecture in a historical neighbourhood, an excellent example of Modernist architecture of the 1970s with fine detailing showcasing craftsmanship of high quality.

== See also ==
- Stelling House
