= Sabinus Seidelin =

Danish businessman (1819–1904)

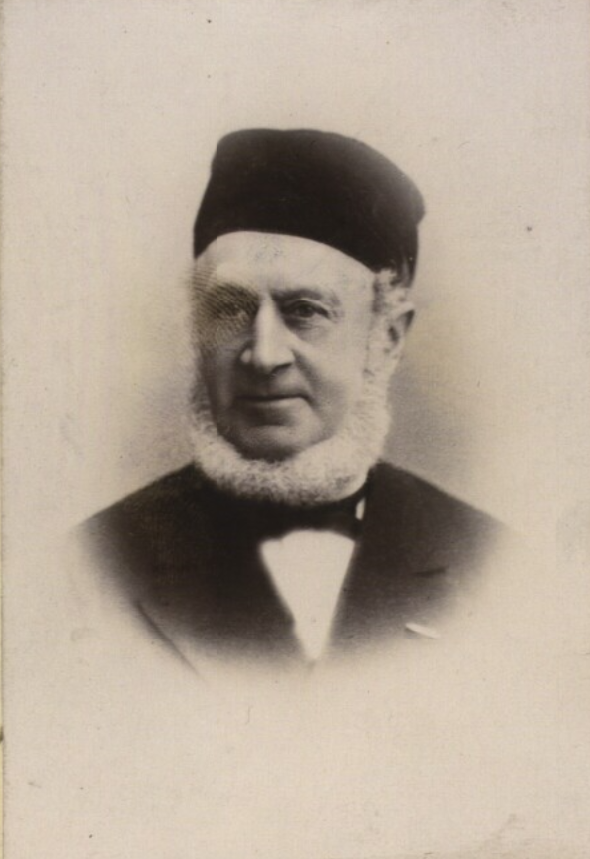
- Seidelin photographed by Niels Knudsen Nyberg
- Born: 20 April 1819; Skanderborg, Denmark
- Died: 29 October 1904 (aged 85); Lönstorp, Sweden
- Occupations: Businessman; Landowner
- Awards: Knight in the Order of the Dannebrog, 1871

Sabinus Theodor William Halvor Seidelin (29 April 1819 – 29 October 1904) was a Danish businessman and landowner. He founded the company S. Seidelin.

== Early life and education ==
Seidelin was born on 29 April 1819 in Skanderborg, the son of pharmacist David Seidelin (1784–1858) and Cecilie Ulrikke Sidelmann (1788–1866). His brother was the historian Paulus Seidelin.

In 1834, Seidelin became an apprentice under merchant Vitus Ingerslev (1801–77) in Aarhus; after completing his apprenticeship, he worked for the firm for a few more years. In 1840, he moved to Hamburg to continue his commercial training at Heuss & Menke. He was later sent back to Denmark by the German company to work as a travelling salesman.

== Career ==
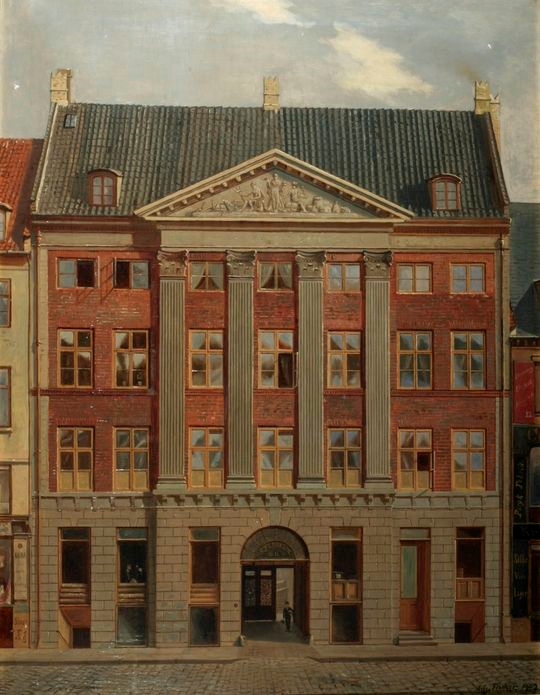
Amagertorv 11

On 19 October 1843, Seidelin opened a shop in Holbæk. His business prospered and developed into a wholesaler. His shop was located at Ahlgade 41.

On 29 May 1856, it relocated to Copenhagen where Seidelin purchased Moses & Søn G. Melchior's property at Amagertorv 11. The company was initially based in a rear wing but continued to grow and soon occupied the whole building.

== Landowner ==
Seidelin purchased the estates Eskildsgård on Bornholm and Nyrupgård in North Zealand and following his retirement from the firm in 1884 spent the remainder of his life managing his estates. He later also acquired the large Lönstorp estate in Scania, Sweden.

== Personal life and legacy ==
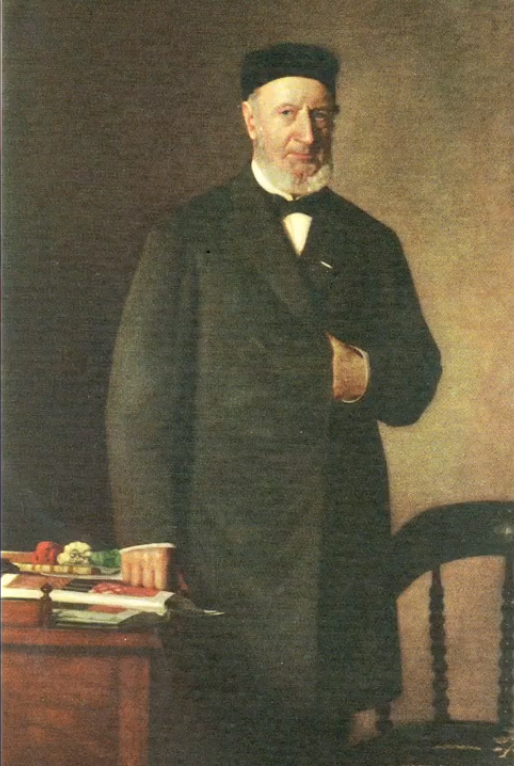
Sabinus Seidelin

Seidelin was on 27 June 1845 married to Christiane Nicoline Nehammer (27 June 1826 – 4 June 1893), daughter of dyer Carl (Carolus) Borromæus Nehammer (1776–1854) and Sophie Frederikke Klein (1785–1834).

He maintained a close relationship to the town of Holbæk even after moving to Copenhagen, visiting the town for the annual "bird shootings". Ge was a driving force behind the construction of the new St. Nicolas' Church. personally donating 5,00 Danish rigsdaler for its construction as well as many of the furnishings and fittings. In 1874, he was appointed the town's first honorary citizen. In 1898, he donated a pavilion to the public park Strandparken. Seidelin was created a Knight in the Order of the Dannebrog in 1972 and awarded the honorary title of etatsråd in 1889.

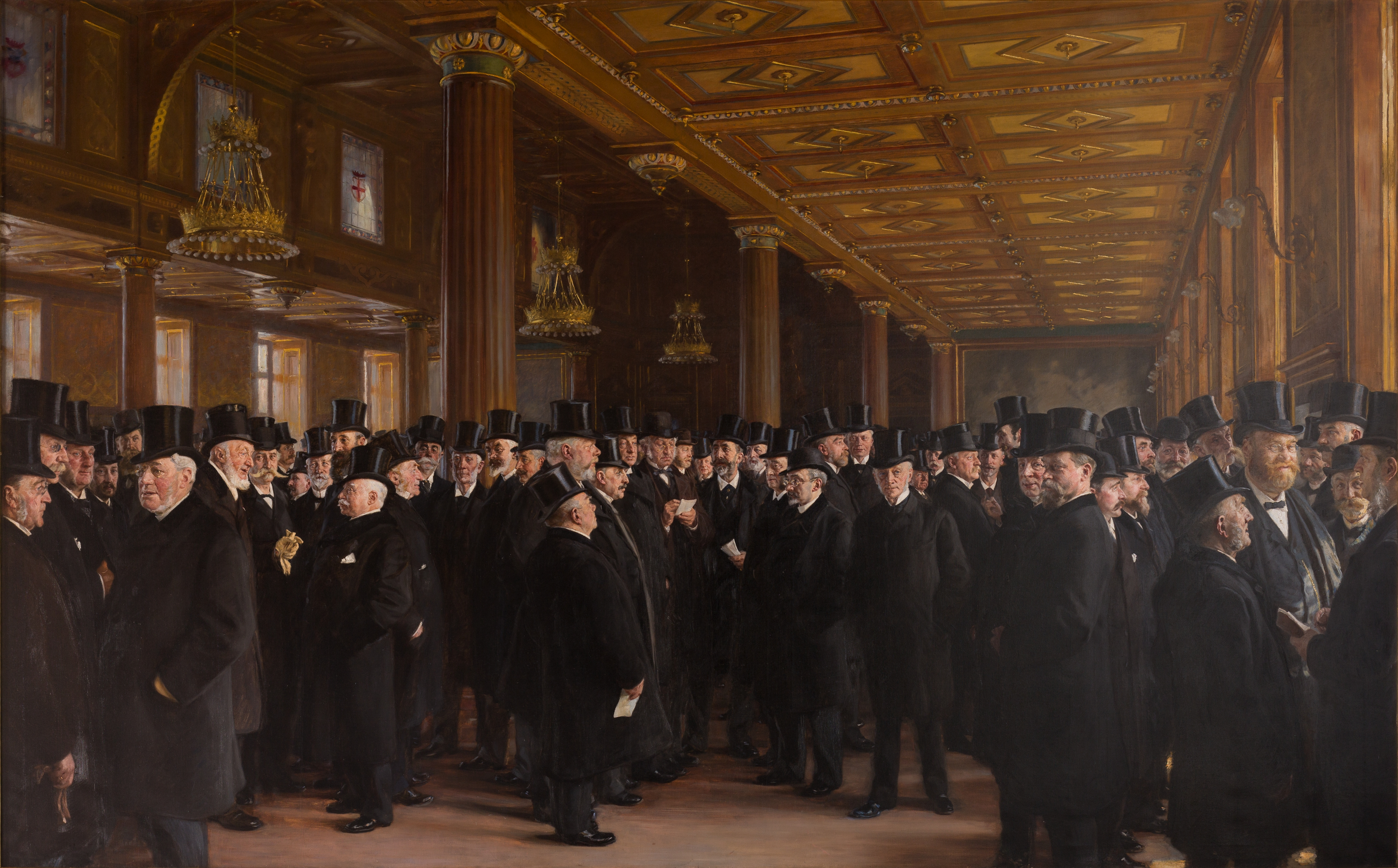
P. S. Krøyer: From Copenhagen Stock Exchange (1895)

He is one of the men seen in Peder Severin Krøyer's monumental 1905 group portrait painting From Copenhagen Stock Exchange (Børsen). A 1904 portrait study of Seidelin by Krøyer is now owned by the Hirschsprung Collection. An 1881 portrait painting of Seidelin by Carl Block is now owned by the Museum of Copenhagen. Seidelin has also been depicted by I. W. Tegner on an 1891 portrait lithography based on a photograph.

Seidelin died on 29 October 1904 at Lönstorp in Scania and is buried in the Garrison Cemetery in Copenhagen.

== See also ==
- Jacob Heinrich Moresco
