= Danish Media Association =

Association of Danish Media (Danish Media Association)
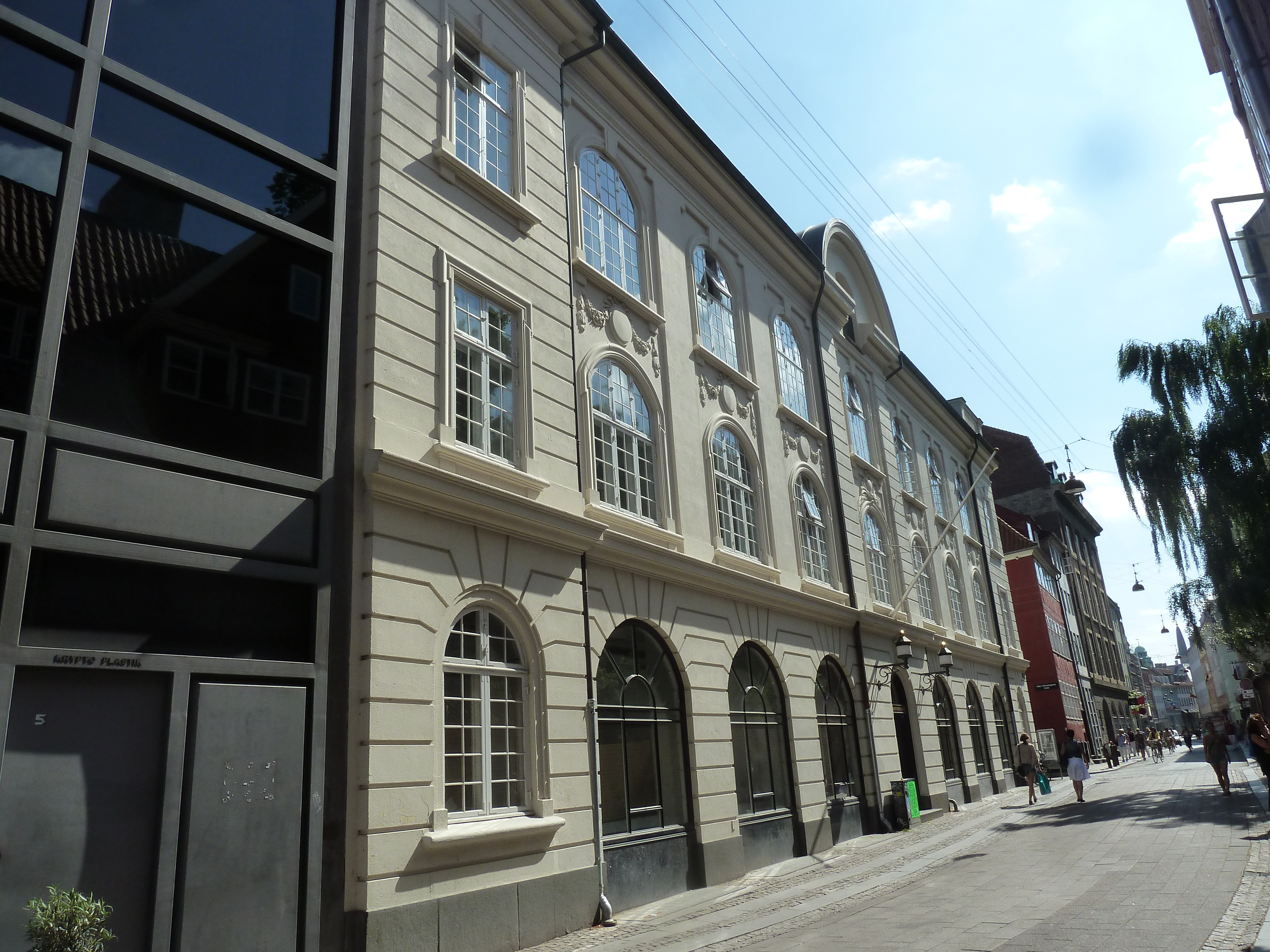
- The organization's headquarters, Pressens Hus, located at Skindergade 7 in Copenhagen, Denmark
- Formation: 2012
- Headquarters: Copenhagen, Denmark
- CEO: Mads Brandstrup
- Website: danskemedier.dk

Association of Danish Media (Danish: Danske Medier) is a membership organization representing more than 250 media companies with a total of 1,000 media outlets, based at Pressens Hus in Copenhagen, Denmark. It works with national and international lobbies, consulting members and organising events for members and the media industry.

== History ==
The organization was founded in 2012/2013 through the merger of all major Danish associations for professional Danish media: Dansk Magasinpresses Udgiverforening (DMU), Danske Dagblades Forening (DDF), Danske Specialmedier (DS), Digitale Publicister (DP), Foreningen af Danske Interaktive Medier (FDIM), Radioerne and Ugeaviserne.

== Board ==
The board as of 2022:

- Christina Blaagaard, Teknologiens Mediehus (chair)
- Jesper Rosener, Jysk Fynske Medier
- Stig Kirk Ørskov, JP/Politikens Hus
- Gitte Hejberg, Fagbladet FOA
- Alex Nielsen, Mediehuset Herning Folkeblad
- Stine Carsten Kendal, Information
- Ole Søndergaard, Radio ABC-gruppen
- Jesper Buchwald, Bonnier Publications
- Anders Krab-Johansen, Berlingske Media
- Christoph Nørgaard, Altinget

== See also ==
- Danske Medier Research
- IAB Danmark
- Danish Film Institute
