= Skindergade =

Street in Copenhagen, Denmark

Coordinates: 55°40′47″N 12°34′28″E

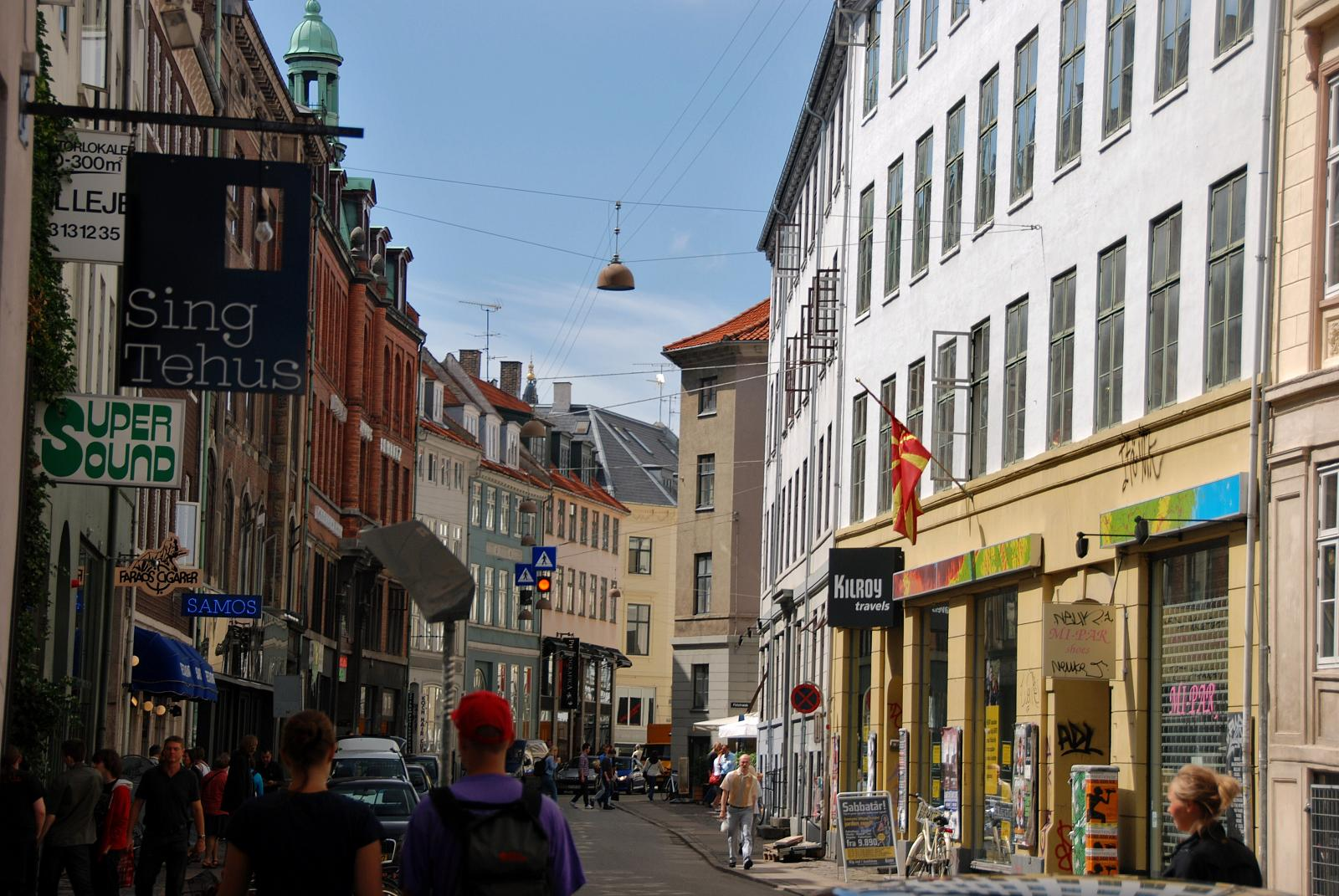
Skindergade

Skindergade is a street in central Copenhagen, Denmark. Running roughly parallel to Strøget, to which it is connected through Jorcks Passage, it extends for approximately 400 metres from Gammeltorv to Købmagergade.

== History ==
Its name dates back to the 15th century when it was a venue for leather craftsmen (skinder- derives from Danish "Skind", meaning skin) such as skinners, glovers, purse-, saddle- and shoemakers.

== Notable buildings and residents ==
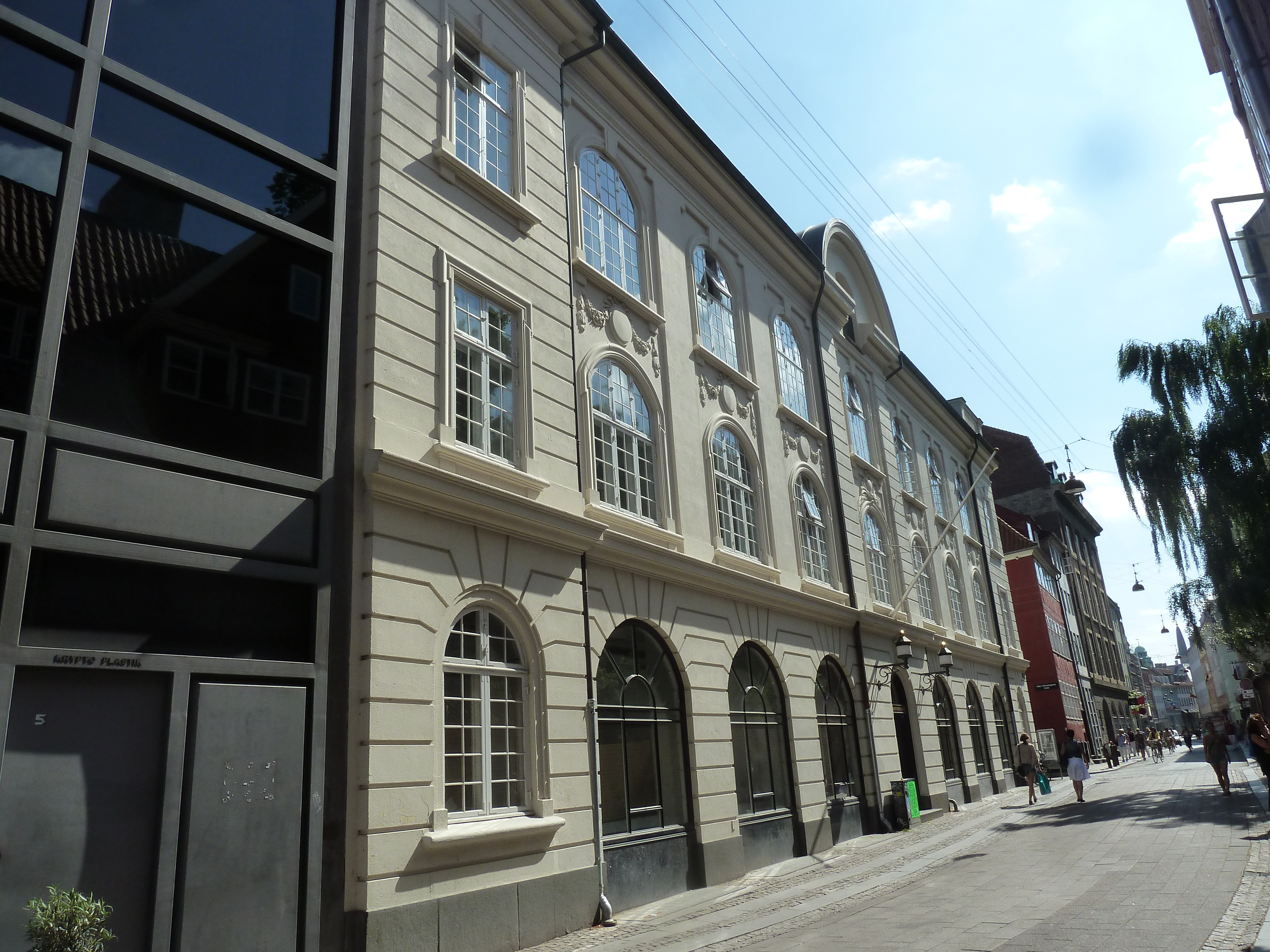
The old part of Pressens Hus

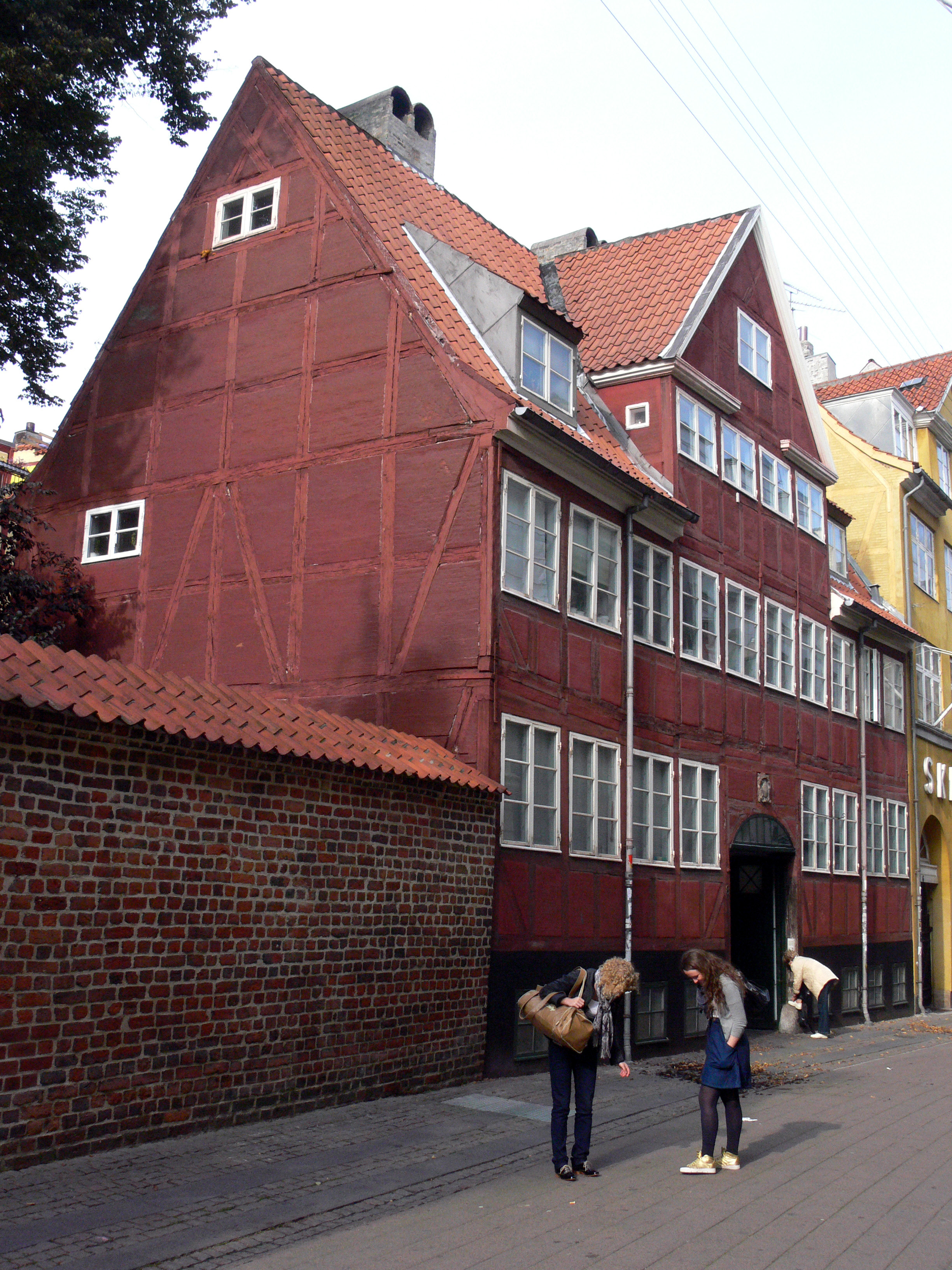
No. 8 Skindergade

Pressens Hus at No. 5–7 is home to the Danish Media Association. It is a former commerce house from 1902, expanded with a glazed extension by Erik Korshagen in 1976.

Kunstnerkollegiet is located at No. 34. N. 45-47 was built for Georg Bestle's wine trading house. The rounded pediment features a relief of Neptune and Mercury.

== Memorial plaque ==
The facade of no. 44 bears a memorial stone over six named members of Holger Danske who in 1945 were arrested there by Gestapo and subsequently executed in Ryvangen.
