= Niels Hemmingsens Gade 3 =

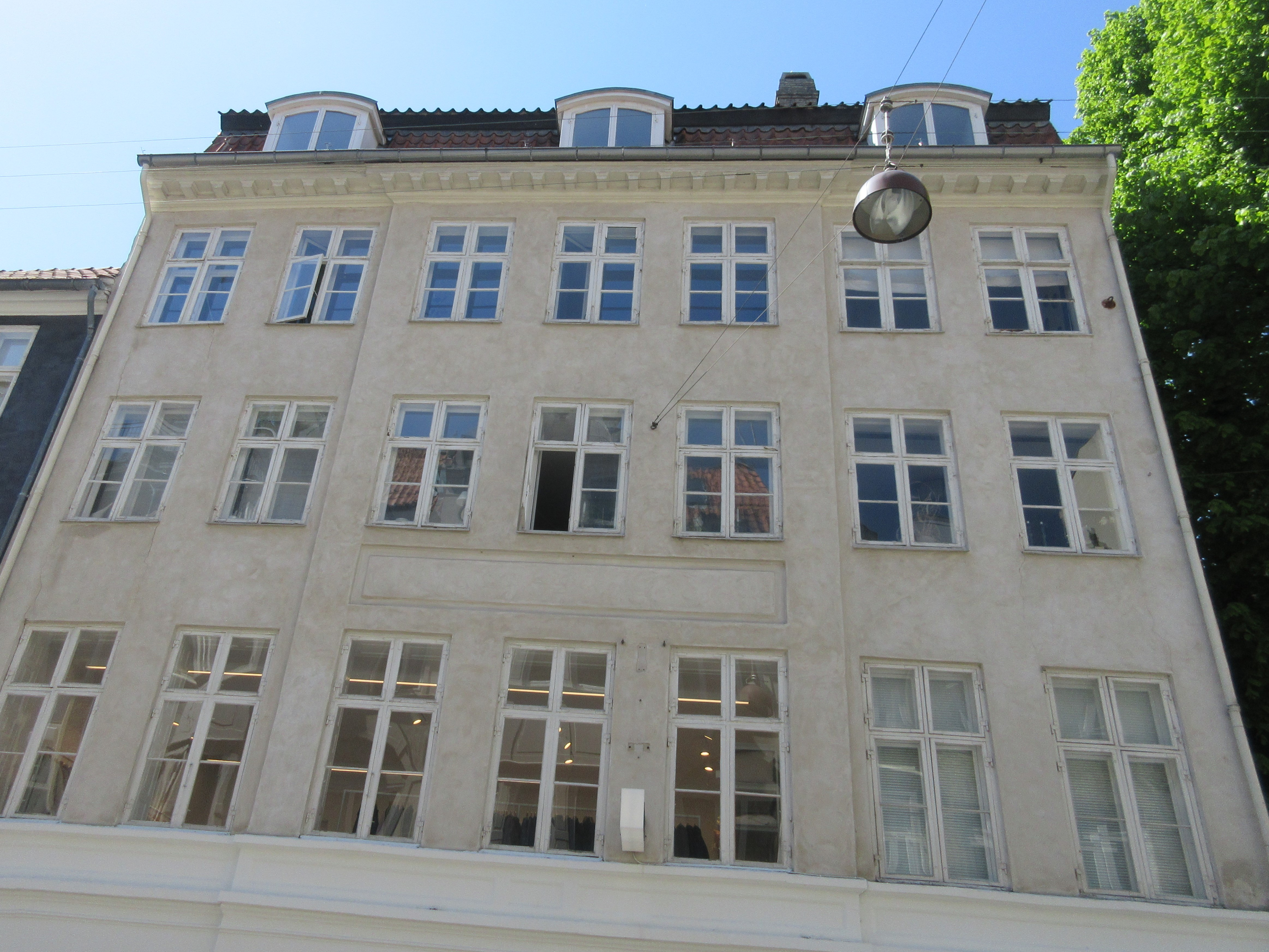
- Interactive map of the Niels Hemmingsens Gade 3 area

General information
- Location: Copenhagen, Denmark
- Coordinates: 55°40′44.33″N 12°34′39.97″E
- Completed: 1786

Niels Hemmingsens Gade 3 is a late 18th-century residential property situated off Amagertorv in the Old Town of Copenhagen, Denmark. It was listed in the Danish registry of protected buildings and places in 1959. The rear side of the building faces the grounds of the Church of the Holy Ghost.

== History ==
=== 18th century ===
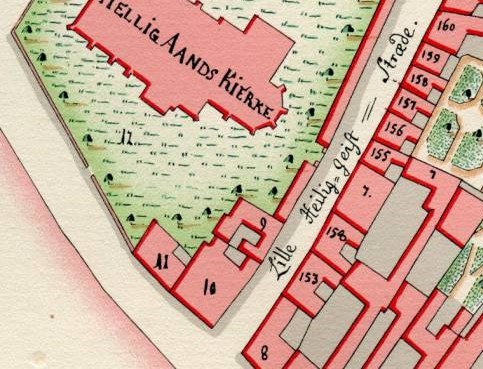
No. 9 seen on a detail from Christian Gedde's map of Frimand's Quarter, 1757.

The site was in the late 17th century part of a larger property owned by merchant (hræmmer) Henrik Hasselman and Lille Hellig Geist Stræde (now part of Niels Hemmingsens Gade). By 1689, it was as No. 178 in Frimand's Quarter owned by wine merchant Herman Mandshol. The corner property (No. 9) was at this point still owned by Henrik Hasselman. In 1756, it was as No. 9 owned by bookbinder Peter Lyman.

The current building on the site was constructed in 1785–86 for sea captain Andreas Hammer. Hammer may be identical to a sea captain Andreas Hammer who in 1779 had captained the frigate Rio Volta in a voyage to the Danish West Indies with a cargo of 472 slaves. In 1791, he was captain of the frigate Geheimraad Gregers Juel.

=== 19th century ===
The property was at the time of the 1801 census home to a total of 18 people distributed on three households. The first household consisted of auditor in Rentekammeret Peter Høvinghoff, his wife Johanne Marie Høvinghoff, the wife's sister Christine Sæbyem the five-year-old relative Else Olive Wahl and the maid Bente Petersen. The second household consisted of professor Cæsar Terette, his wife Theresa Terette, their daughter Theodora Terette and the 14-year-old servant Poul Nielsen. The third household consisted of the bookdealer Jacob Paaske and his wife Cecilia Hammer, the nephew Joachim Paaske, the bookdealer's apprentice Nicolai Petersen, the maid Sophie Marie, the 60-year-old widow Abigael Hammer, the widow's sister-in-law Anne Marie Lund, the widow's daughter Seraphine Hammer and the lodger Abraham Tidemann. It seems likely that the former owner Andreas Hammer and the 1801 residents Cecilia and Abigael Hammer were related but it is not clear how.

The property was in the new cadastre of 1806 listed as No. 166. It was by then owned by Anton J. Harder.

The property was at the time of the 1840 census home to a total of 19 people. Wilhelmine Charlotte Lindem a 63-year-old unmarried woman, was operating a sort of boarding house for girls on the three upper floors. Seven girls aged eight to 17 were living there with her. Two governesses, a house maid (husjomfru), a female cook, a maid, a seamstress and a male caretaker were also living there with them. Georg Christian Nicolaisen, who worked as a clerk for the Danish Admiralty, resided with his sister Johanne Christiane Lorentsine Nicolaysen, the maid Dorthea Lovise Klinge and the jurist Ernst Aretander on the ground floor.

The property was at the time of the 1845 census home to a total of 18 people. Thorleif Gudmund Repp, a translator, resided with his wife Nicoline Petr. Repp, their four children and two maids on the second floor.Necoline Sundorph. a 63-year-old widow, resided with her two daughters, her two-year-old granddaughter, the wet nurse Birte Nielsdatter and a maid on the first floor. Caroline Schiødte, another widow, resided with her two unmarried children and a maid on the third floor.

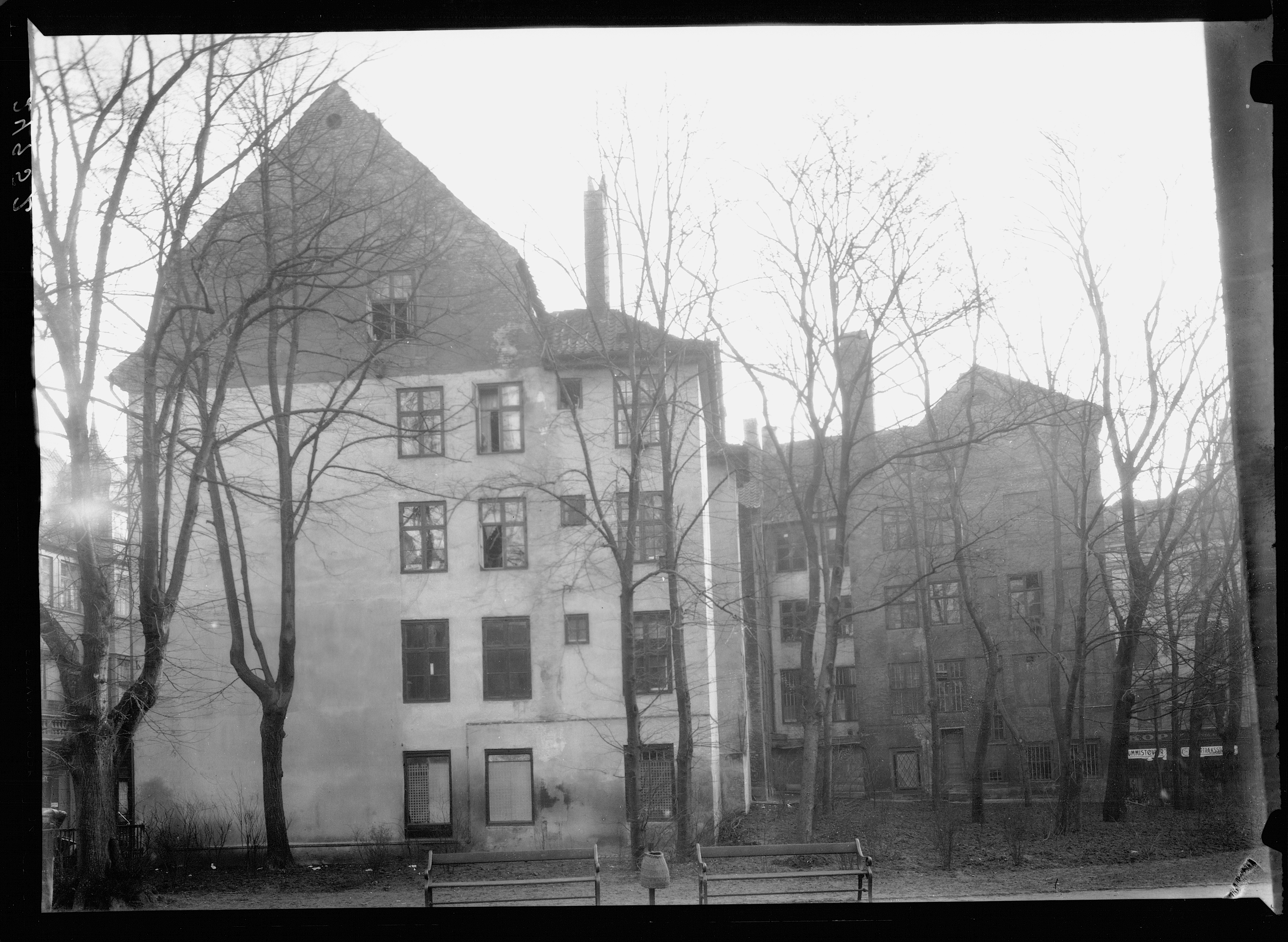
Niels Hemmingsens Gade 3 photographed from the north by Peter Elfelt in 1927.

The property was at the time of the 1860 census home to a total of 16 people. Stig Mygind (1813-1867), a lawyer, resided with his wife Marie Louise née Dahl, their four children and a maid on the first floor. Christiane Philippine née Dormeyer (1797-1865), widow of pastor Peter Johannes Spang (1796-1846), resided with her three unmarried daughters, the widow Frederikke Milche née Rohmenberg and a maid on the second floor. Spang's late husband had died back in 1846, just one year after being appointed as minister of the Church of the Holy Ghost. Nicoline Marie Lønholdt and Emilie Hauptmann, two unmarried women working with needlework, resided with a maid on the third floor.

== Architecture ==
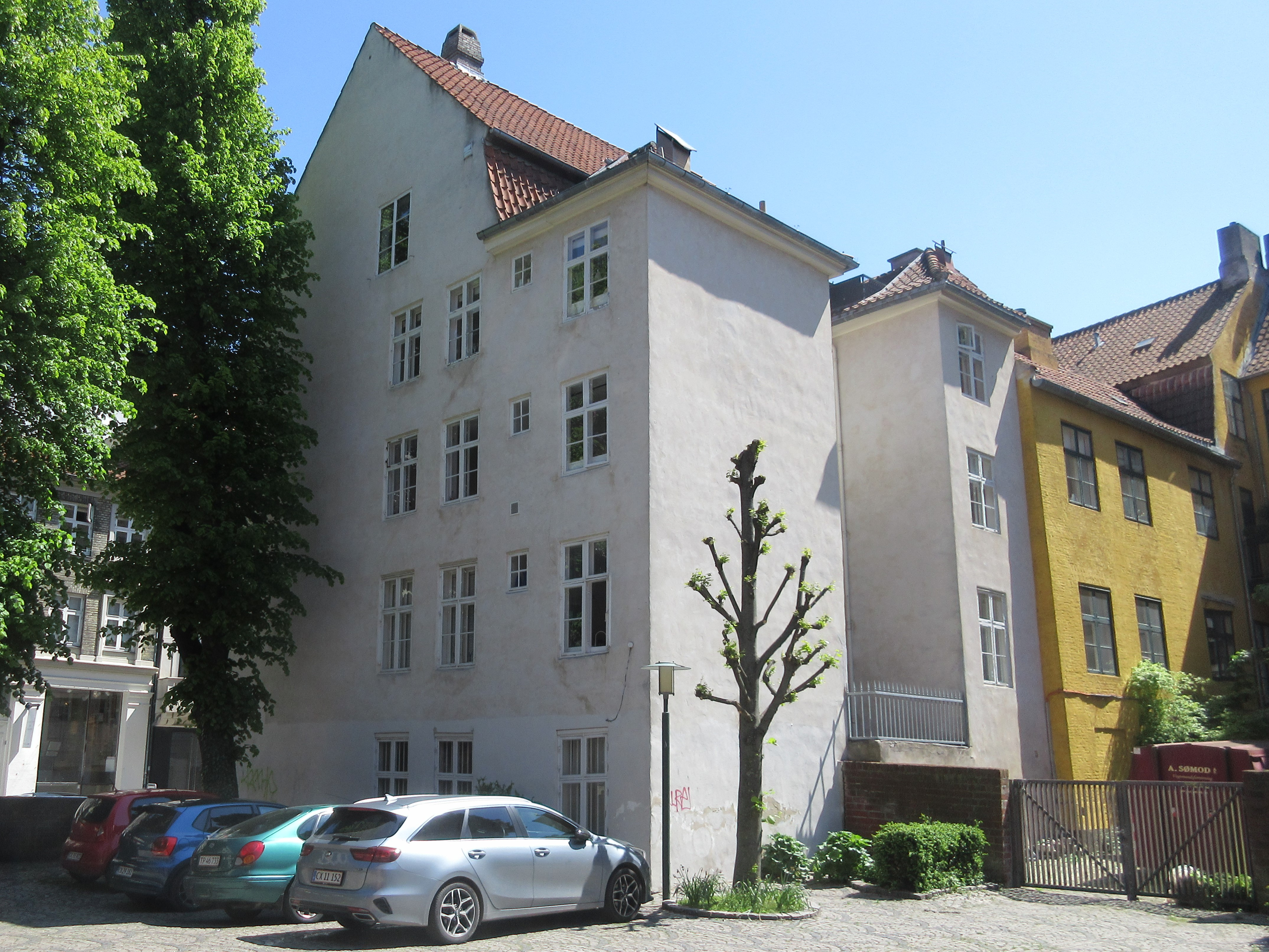
The rear side of the building.

Niels Hemmingsens Gade 3 is a four-storey building with a seven bays long facade with a slightly projecting median risalit towards the street. The building is to the south attached to Niels Hemmingsens Gade 1 while its north gable is exposed. Two short perpendicular side wings extends from the rear side of the building. The main wing is topped by a Mansard roof clad with red tile. The northern side wing is topped by a hip roof. The southern side wing was originally topped by a monopitched roof but is now topped by a half-hipped roof. The ground floor of the building was originally open towards the yard but closed off before 1810.

== Today ==
Niels Hemmingsens Gade contains a retail space in the ground floor and the southern part of the first floor. It contains two condominiums on each of the upper floors. The property is owned by Eherforeningen Niels Hemmingsens Gade 3.

== Gallery ==
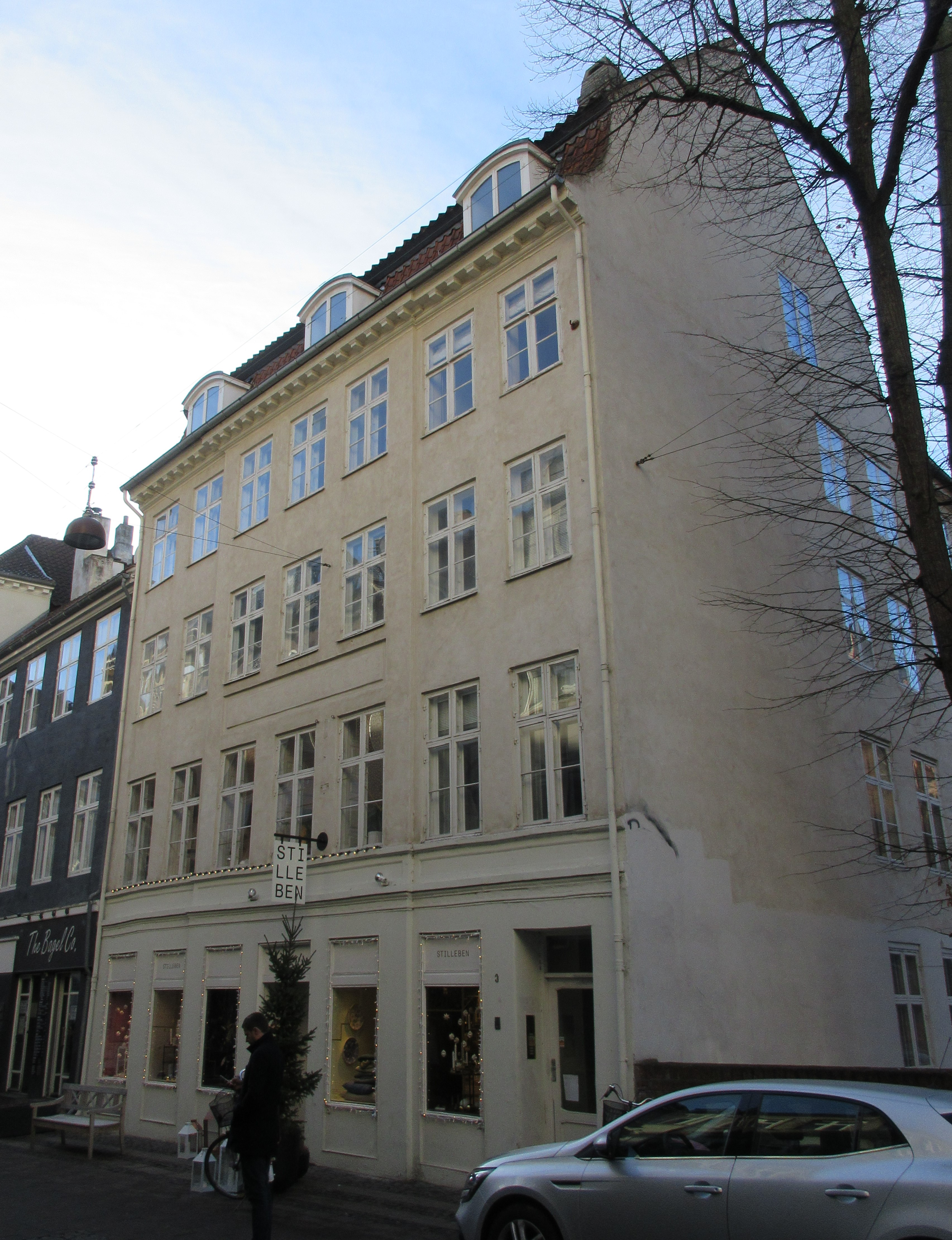
The building seen from the street

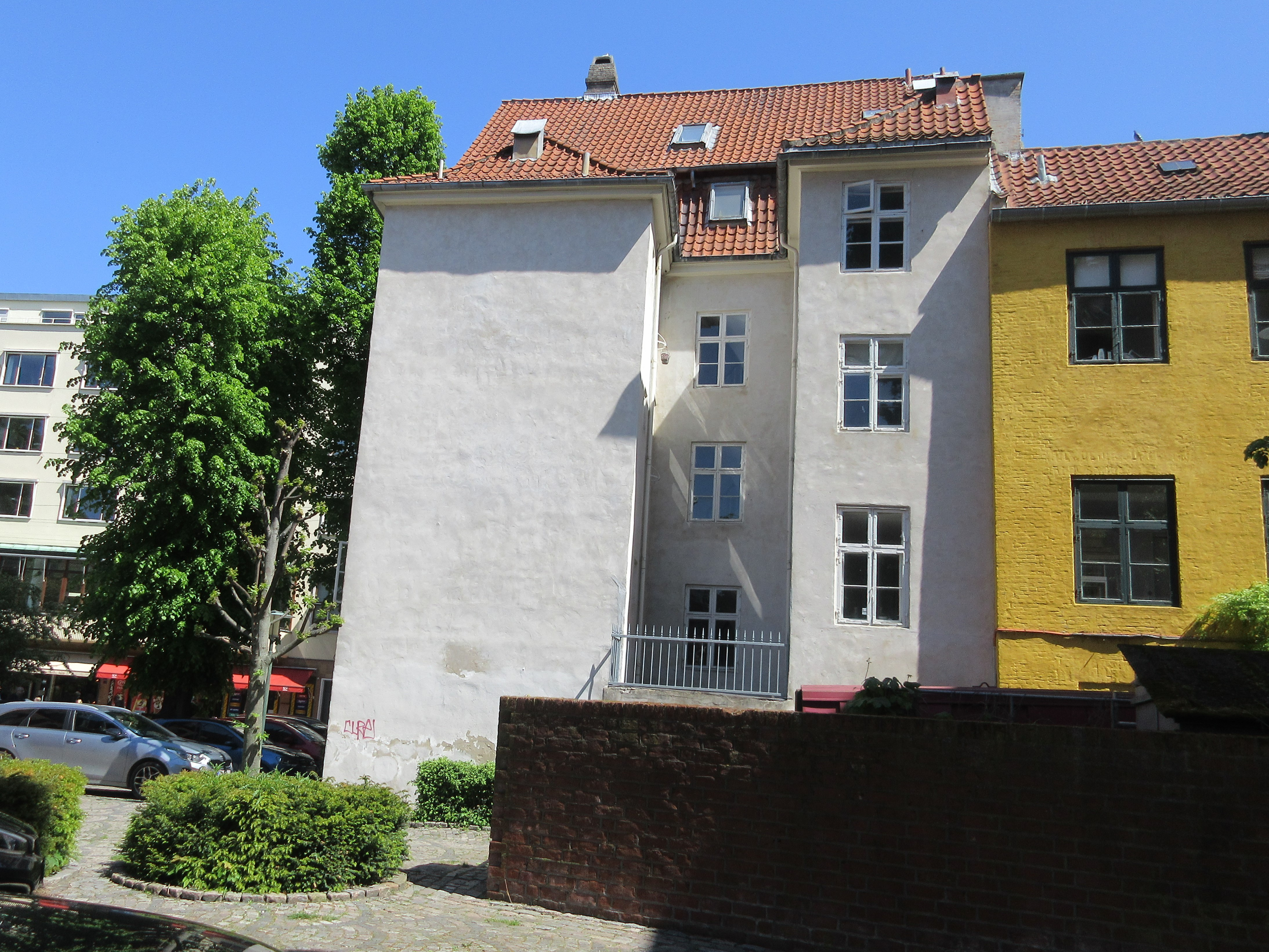
The rear side of the building.

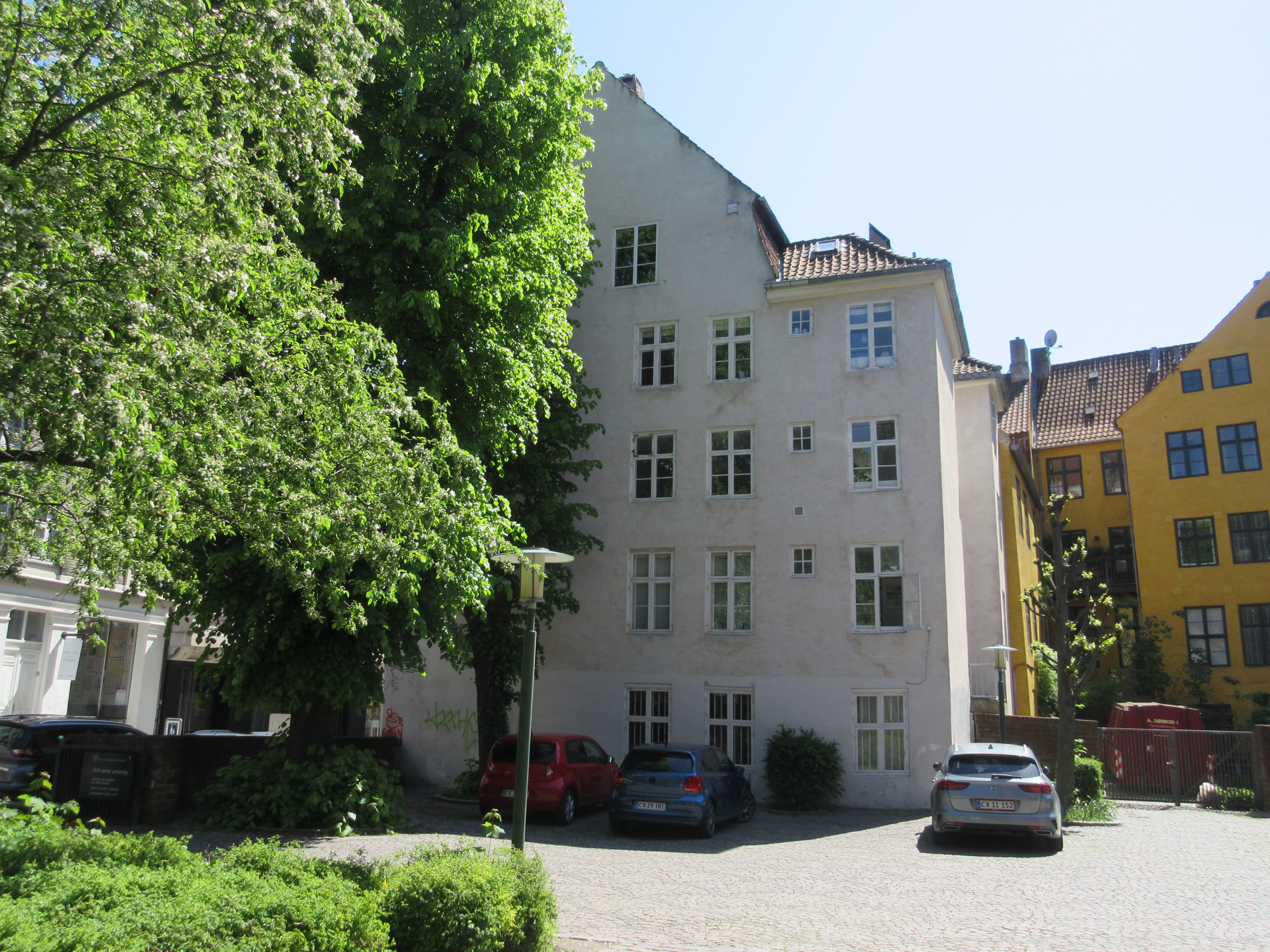
North gable

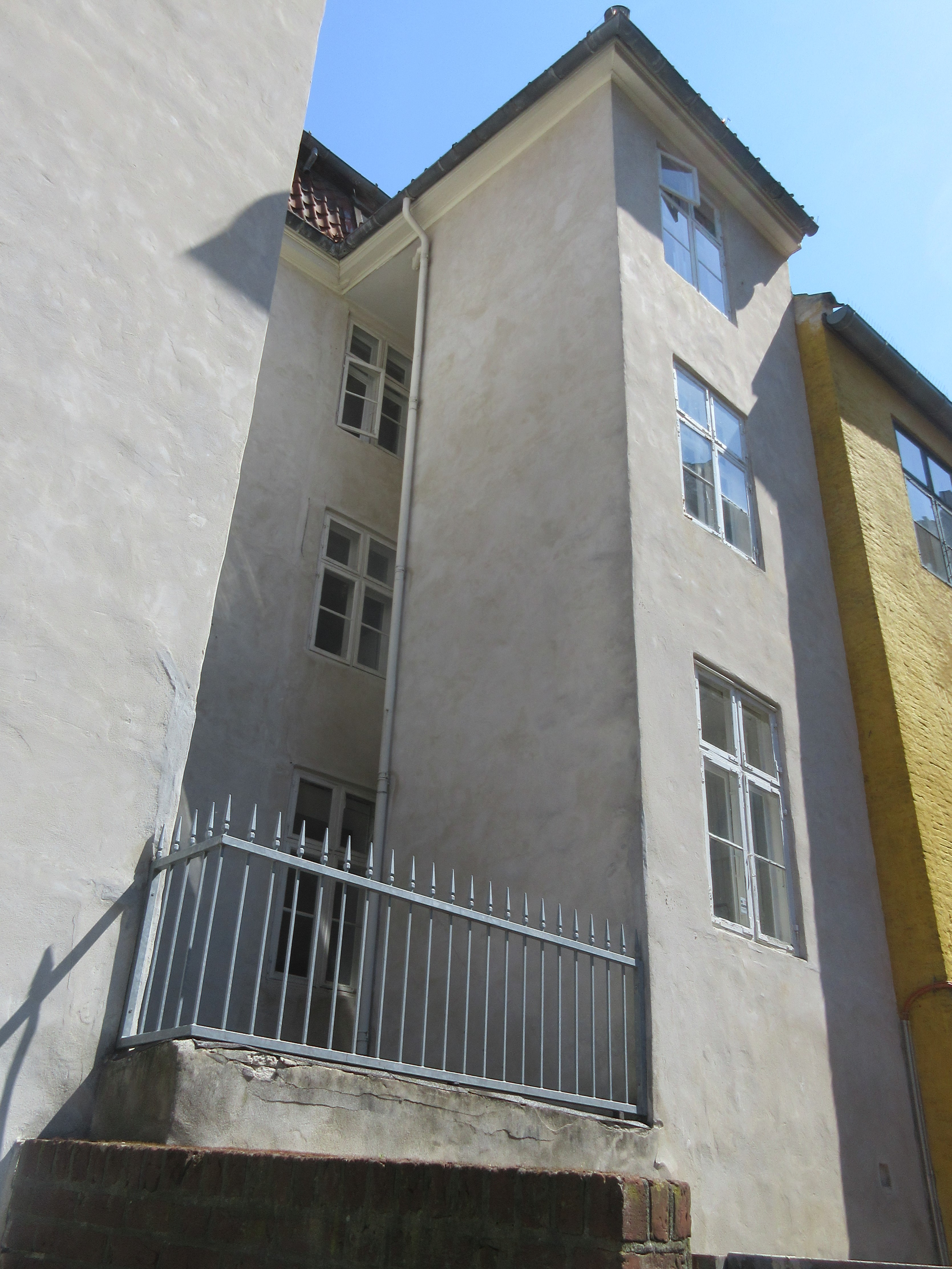
