= Niels Hemmingsen =

Danish Lutheran theologian

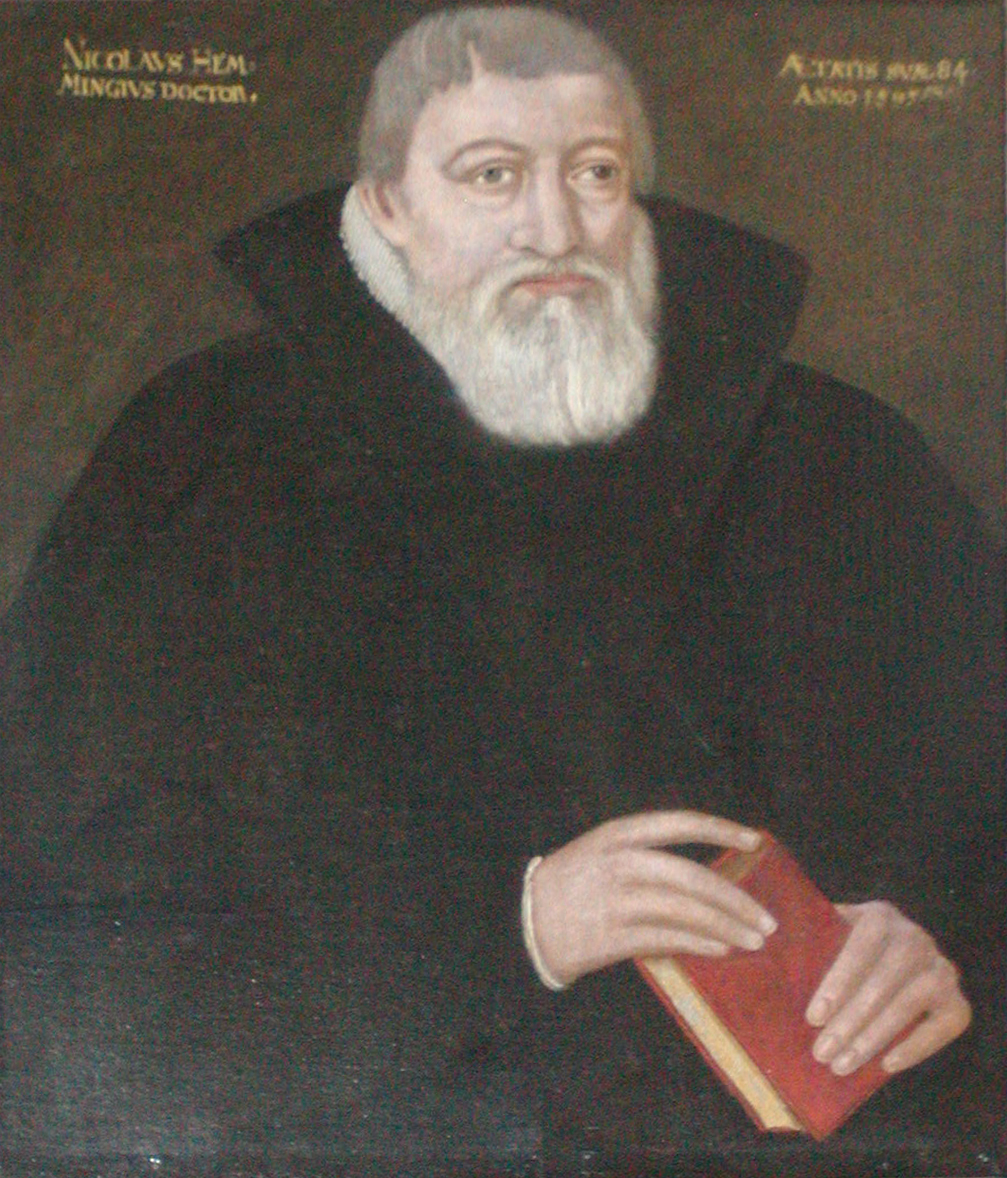
- Born: May/June 1513; Errindlev, Lolland, Denmark
- Died: 23 May 1600 (aged 86–87); Roskilde, Denmark
- Burial place: Roskilde Cathedral
- Other name: Nicolaus Hemmingius
- Education: Martin Luther University of Halle-Wittenberg
- Occupations: Pastor and professor

Niels Hemmingsen (May/June 1513 – 23 May 1600), Latinized Nicolaus Hemmingius, was a Danish Lutheran theologian. He was pastor of the Church of the Holy Ghost, Copenhagen and professor at the University of Copenhagen. The street Niels Hemmingsens Gade in Copenhagen is named in his honor.

== Biography ==
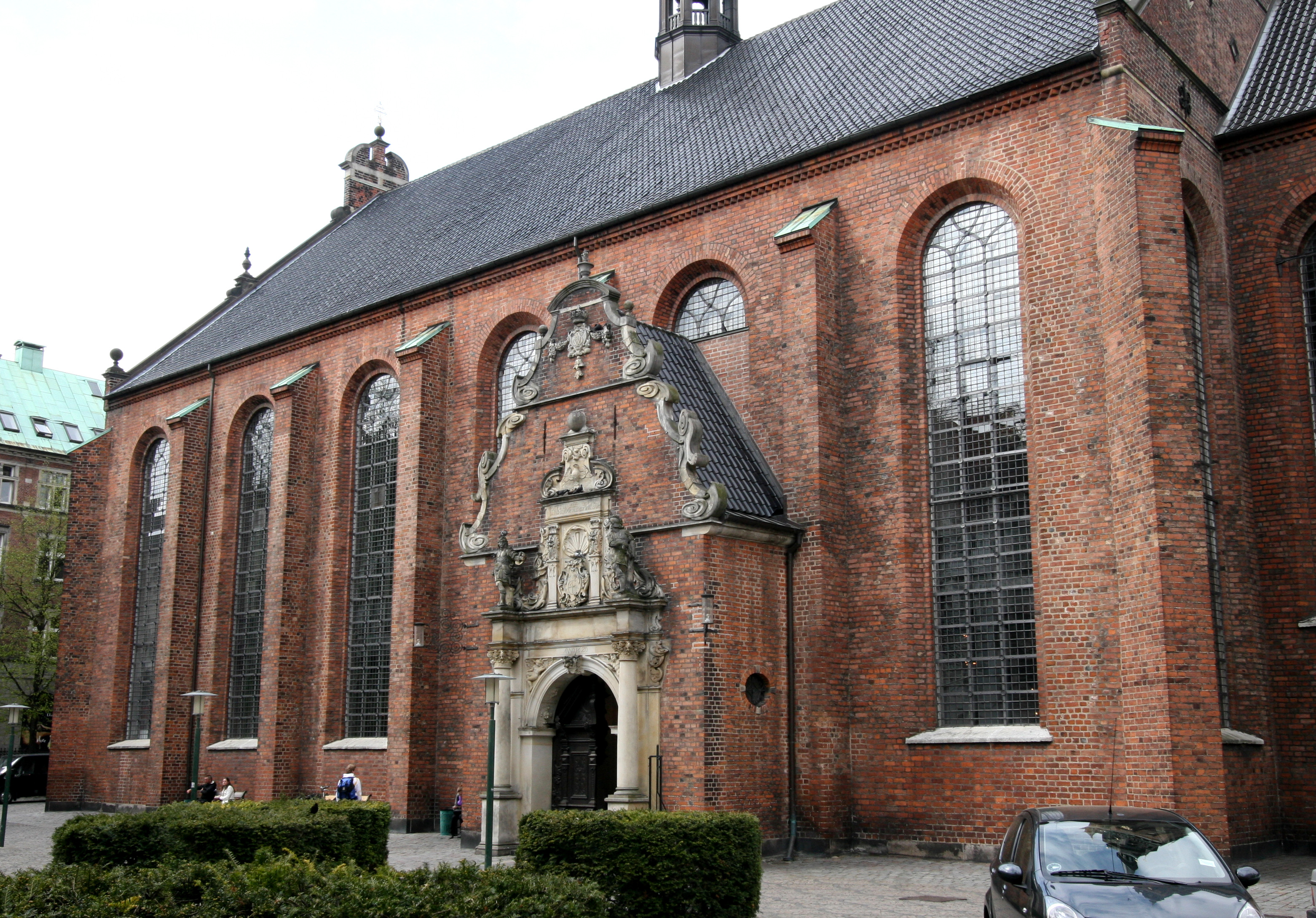
Church of the Holy Ghost, Copenhagen

Born in Errindlev on Lolland. He attended Latin school at Nysted and Roskilde. He studied from 1537 to 1542 at the University of Wittenberg, where the humanistic theology of Philipp Melanchthon made a strong impression on him. Returning to Denmark, he became a prolific author of works in Latin. In 1543 he became professor of Greek at the University of Copenhagen and in 1553 professor of theology. He was pastor of the Church of the Holy Ghost, Copenhagen from 1547 to 1553. He received his doctorate in 1557 and became vice chancellor in 1572.

He gained great influence as a teacher and was also an adviser to the king and the National Council. In 1574 he published Syntagma institutionum christianarum, but was obliged to retract it in 1576 following pressure from Augustus, Elector of Saxony to suppress Crypto-Calvinism.

In 1575 he published Admonito de superstitionibus magicus vitandis, a warning against practicing witchcraft. This was an important text on demonology and witchcraft in the 16th century. He used a wide definition of witchcraft, including not only harmful activities, but all superstitious and magical behavior. Not all witches had pacts with the devil. Witchcraft and magic were breaches of the first two Commandments, idolatry and sacrilege. He wrote that most of the Devil's power came through illusions and that witches only did physically impossible things in dreams, like flying on brooms. Hemmingsen found drowning tests unreliable since they relied on superstition that the Devil could manipulate.

In 1579 Frederick II suspended Hemmingsen from his teaching role at the University of Copenhagen after representations from his brother-in-law, Augustus, Elector of Saxony, husband of Anne of Denmark. He settled in Roskilde, where he lived until his death.

Hemmingsen met James VI of Scotland at Roskilde on 11 March 1590 and they had a long discussion or debate in Latin on theological issues and predestination. James VI, who had owned four of his books since 1575, gave him a silver gilt cup. The English ambassador in Scotland, Robert Bowes heard they disagreed about predestination.
