= Vilhelm Klein =

Danish architect

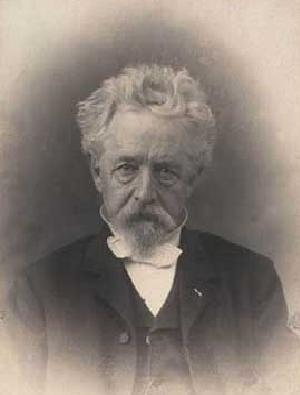
- Vilhelm Klein (c. 1900)
- Born: Vilhelm Klein; 6 March 1835; Copenhagen, Denmark
- Died: 10 February 1913 (aged 77)
- Parent(s): Ditlev Vilhelm Klein (1793-1868) and Marie Kirstine Skousboe

Signature
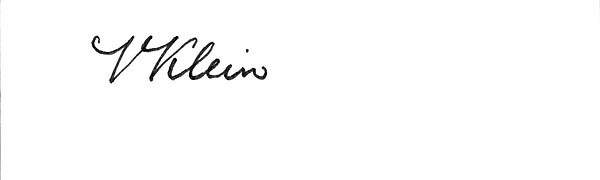

Vilhelm Klein (6 March 1835 – 10 February 1913) was a Danish architect who adopted the Historicist approach, frequently emulating the so-called Rosenborg style and the Italian Renaissance style.

== Early life ==
Born in Copenhagen, Denmark, as the son of Ditlev Vilhelm Klein (1793-1868) and Marie Kirstine Skousboe (1806-1891). He first trained as a stonemason before studying at the Royal Danish Academy of Fine Arts where he was awarded the grand silver medal in 1856. From 1851 to 1856, he worked as a draftsman for Michael Gottlieb Bindesbøll who he always considered to have been his main instructor.

== Career ==
From 1857 to 1862, he worked as an architectural designer for Ferdinand Meldahl who also influenced his style. He also worked for Johan Daniel Herholdt during the construction of Selchausdal Manor (1857) in Kalundborg, thus receiving insights for the most prominent architects of the day.

Klein was particularly fond of the Rosenborg style based on the Dutch Renaissance trends under Christian IV, crediting Bindesbøll for its prominent place in Danish architecture. From 1866 to 1872, he undertook substantial extensions to Bindesbøll's Lægeforeningens boliger social housing development in the Østerbro District of Copenhagen. His masterpieces include the Industriforeningen Building in the Italian Renaissance style on Vesterbro (erected 1872 in conjunction with the Nordic Exhibition, demolished 1976-77), the Danish Museum of Art & Design (Kunstindustrimuseet) in the Rosenborg style on Rådhuspladsen (1893), and the main building at the Ny Carlsberg Brewhouse (1901) also in Italian Renaissance style.

== Culture canon ==
Vilhelm Klein is listed in the Danish Culture Canon together with Michael Gottlieb Bindesbøll in connection with the social housing development in Lægeforeningens boliger—Brumleby.

== List of works ==
- Garden Wing of Selchausdal (1857, listed)
- Organ in Frederiksborg Chapel, Hillerød (1861)
- Villa Sommariva, Nordre Strandvej, Helsingør (c. 1865)
- Provost Monrad's villa, Falkoner Allé, Frederiksberg (1866, demolished in 1907)
- Freemasons' Lodge (Lundegade wing), Helsingør (1866–67)
- Ringsted Oharmacy, Ringsted (1867)
- Extension of Brumleby, Østerbrogade 57, row J-S (1867–72, listed)
- Sparekassen for Kjøbenhavn og Omegn, Niels Hemmingsens Gade 24, Copenhagen (1867–68, with H. C. Stilling)
- Extension of Sparekassen for København og Omegn, Valkendorfsgade, Copenhagen (1873 and 1876)
- Industriudstillingsbygning, Vesterbrogade 1, Copenhagen (1868, built 1870-72 and 1879, demolished 1977)
- Langkilde House, Helsingør (1868, possibly only project)
- Ganløse Workhouse, Ganløse (1869)
- Aalborg By og Omegns Sparekasse, Aalborg (1873–74, altered)
- Centralhotellet, Rådhuspladsen 16/Vesterbrogade 2 A, Copenhagen (1873–74, demolished 1934)
- Jernbanegade 3-5, Copenhagen (1874, demolished)
- Holbergsgade 14, Copenhagen (1874)
- Peder Skrams Gade 15, Copenhagen (1874)
- Rådhuspladsen 14, Copenhagen (1875, demolished 1960)
- Store Kongensgade 63, Copenhagen (1875)
- Holbergsgade 16, Copenhagen (1876)
- Frederiksborggade 28-30, Copenhagen (1876)
- Karens Minde, Wagnersvej 19 (1877 and 1894)
- Extension of Brumleby, Copenhagen (1878, demolished)
- Døvstummeskole, Baldersgade (1880, 1903-1974 Balders Hospital)
- Tegne- og Kunstindustriskolen for Kvinder, H.C. Andersens Boulevard 10, Copenhagen (1880-1881, listed)
- Facade of Sparekassen for Helsingør og Omegn, Stengade, Helsingør (1883)
- Mellem- og Realskole, Klosterstræde, Holbæk (1884–85)
- Kronprinsesse Louises Asyl, Østerbrogade 57 A, Copenhagen (1886, now Sankt Jakobs Sogns Børnehave)
- Buerup Kirke, Buerup (1887)
- Lillemosegård, Søborg (1887–88, renovated)
- Gammelmosehus, Vangede (designed 1888, built 1892, demolished)
- Exhibition Building for the French Exhibition (1888, demolished)
- Danish pavilion for the World Expo in Paris (1889)
- H.C. Andersen Slottet, H.C. Andersens Boulevard 22-24 (1892–94)
- G.E.C. Gad Building, Vimmelskaftet 32, Copenhagen (1897)
- De Kellerske Anstalter, institutions for the mentally disabled in Brejning by Vejle Fjord (1898-1901, renovated)
- Brejning Watertower, Brejning (1901)
- Vestbanegård Watertower, Varde (1901)
- Ny Carlsberg Brewhouse, Carlsberg, Copenhagen (1901, based on initial sketch by Carl Jacobsen, listed)
- Main building, bottling plant and gatekeeper's house, Carlsberg, Vester Fælledvej 100 (1902–03, altered)

== Gallery ==
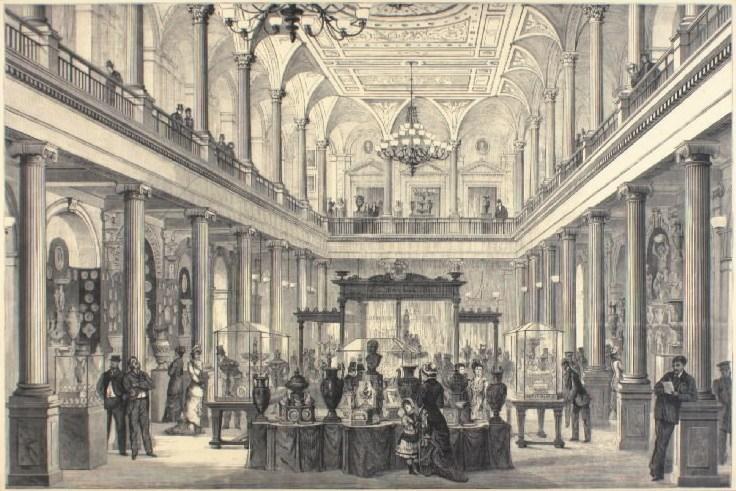
Industruforening Building (1872)

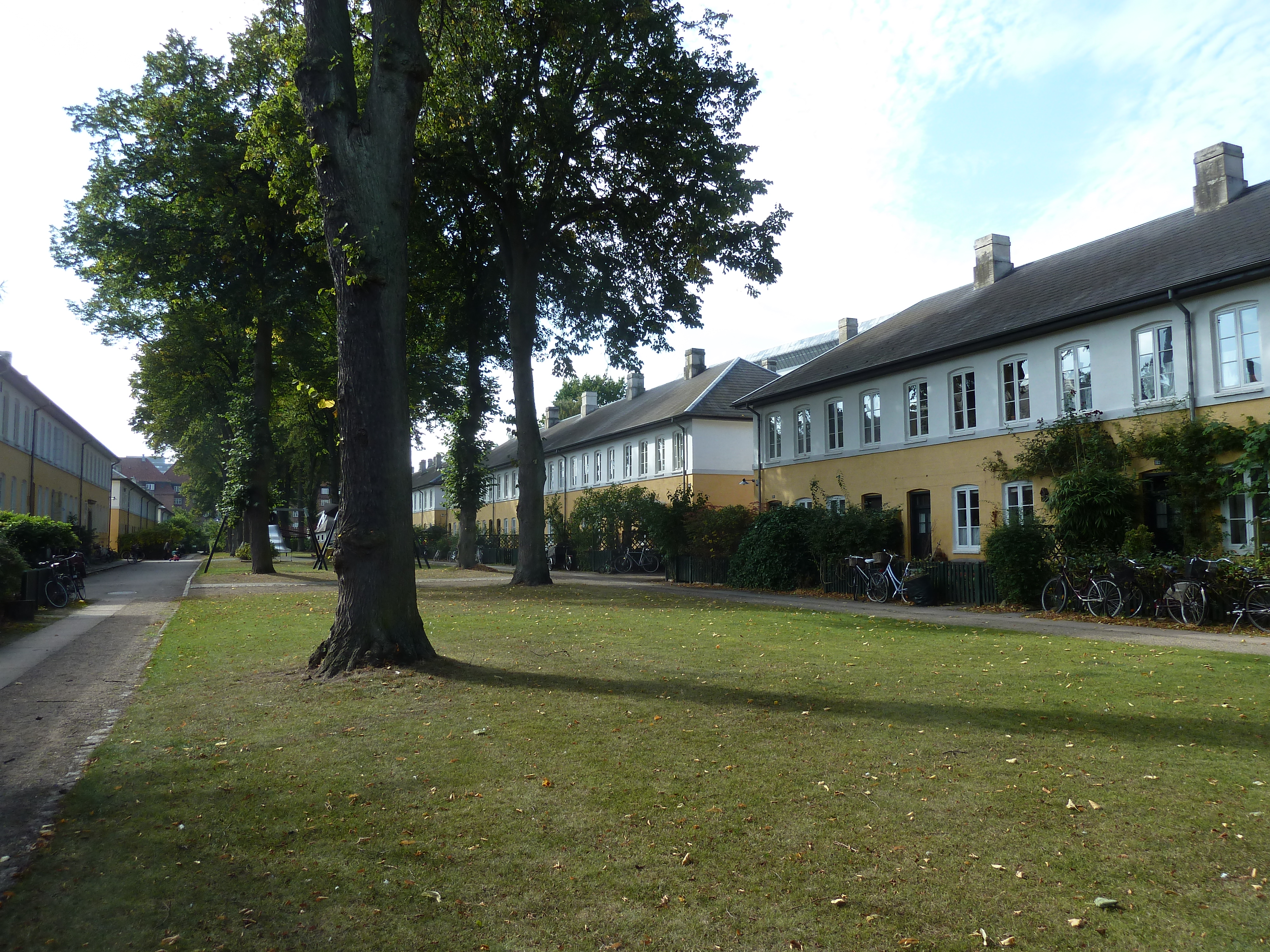
Lægeforeningens boliger in Brumleby (completed 1872)

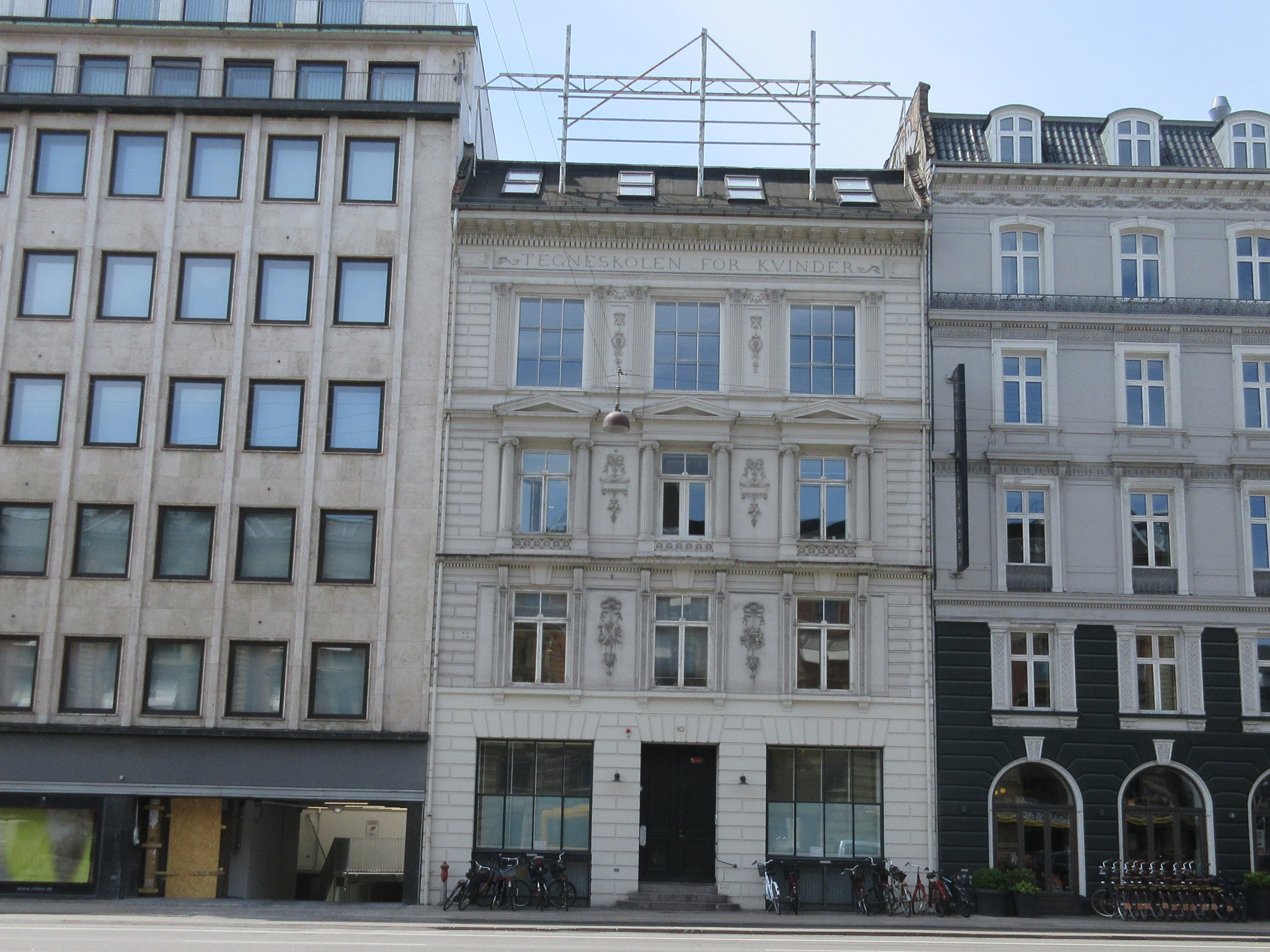
Tegneskolen for Kvinder, Copenhagen (1880–81)

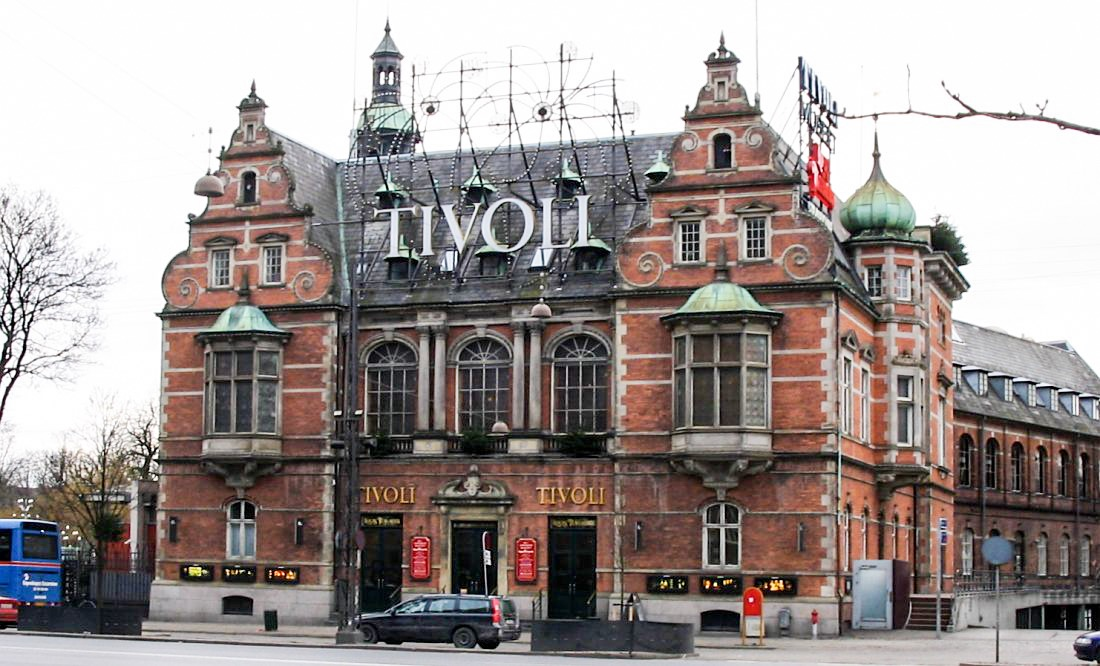
Kunstindustri Museum (1894)

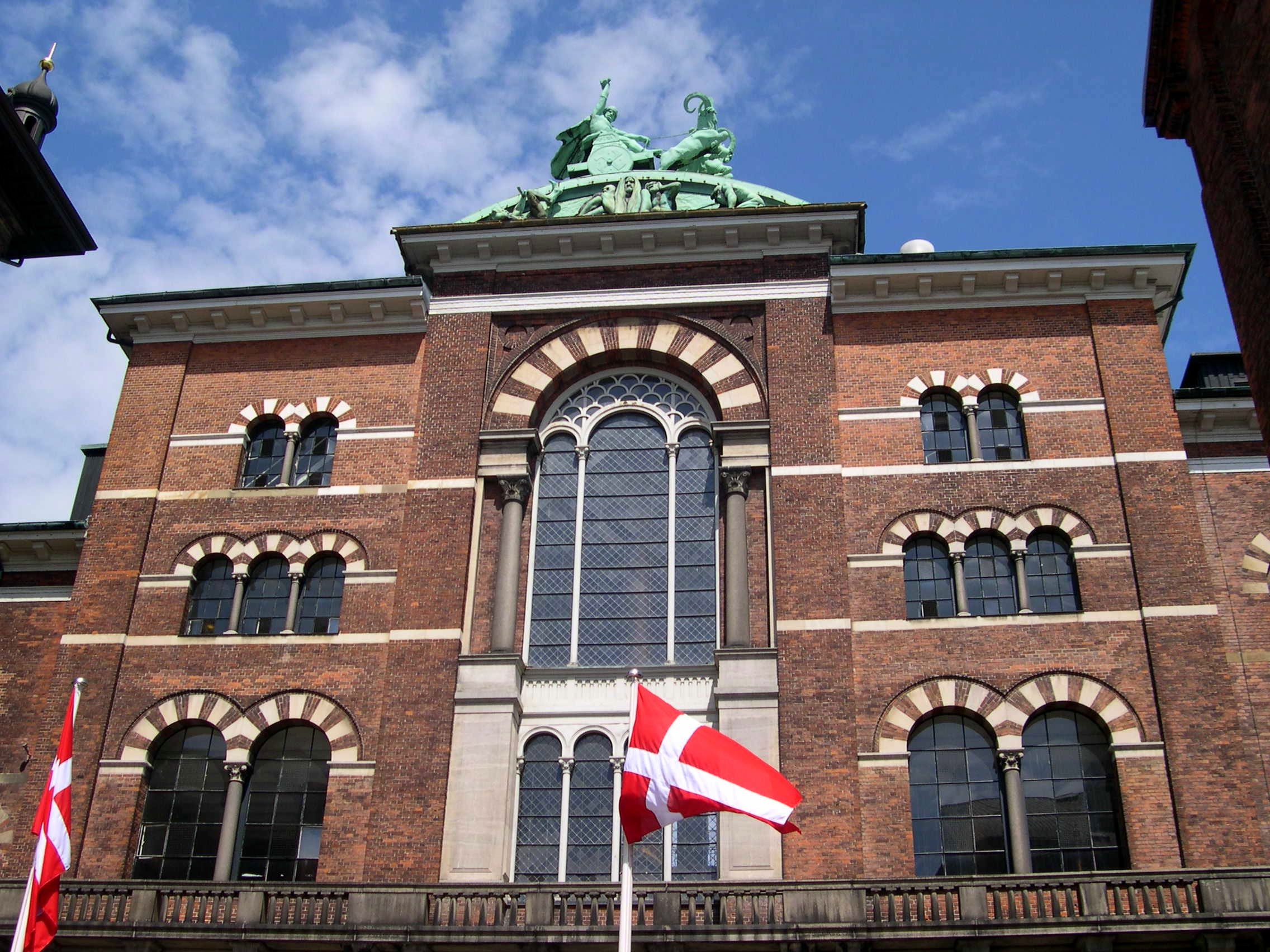
Ny Carlsberg Brewhouse (1901)
