= Niels Hemmingsens Gade =

Street in Copenhagen, Denmark

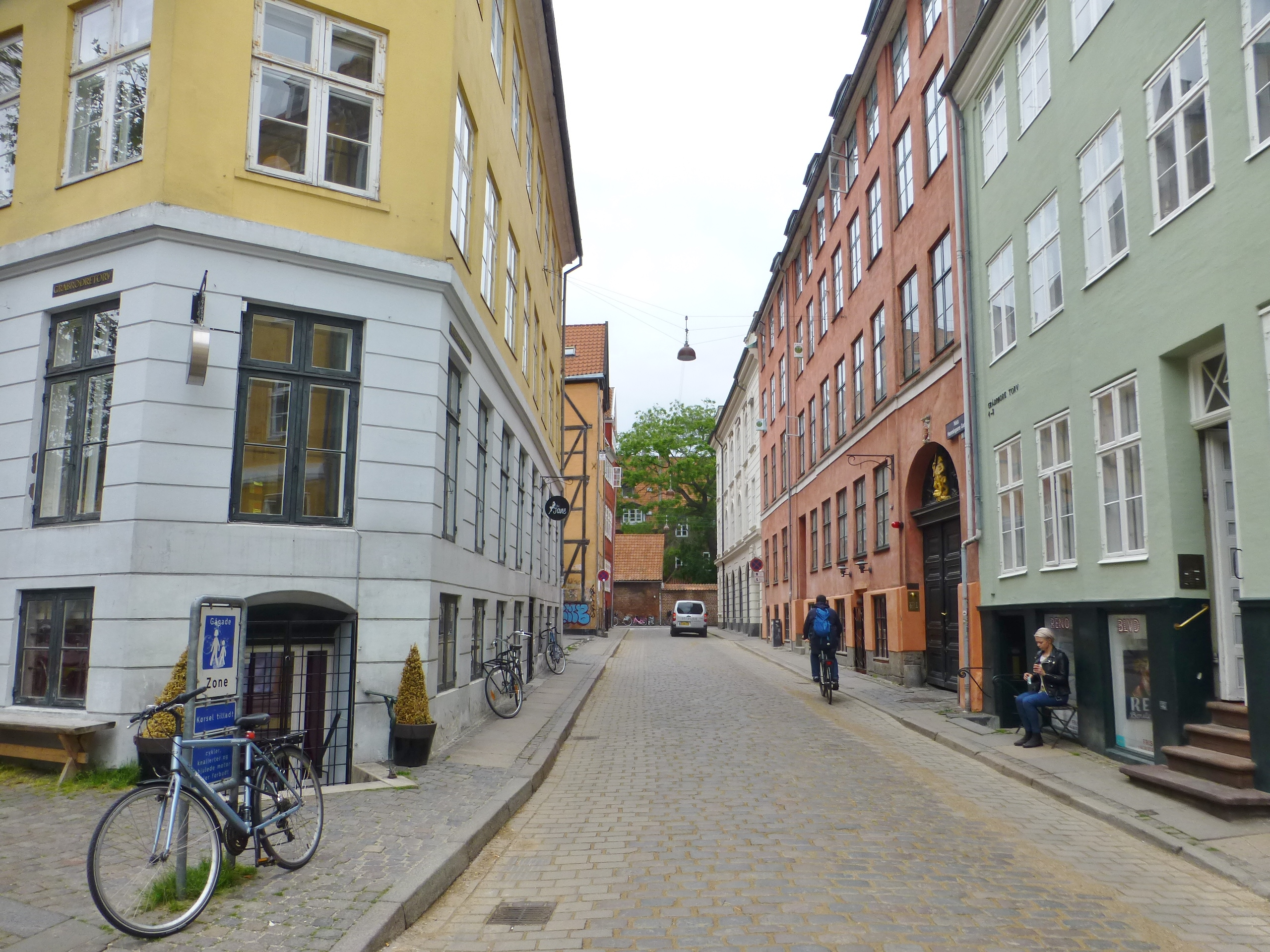
- A view down Åbenrå from the northern end of the street
- Interactive map of Niels Hemmingsens Gade
- Length: 245 m (804 ft)
- Location: Indre By, Copenhagen, Denmark
- Postal code: 1153
- Nearest metro station: Gammel Strand
- Coordinates: 55°40′46.56″N 12°34′37.92″E

Niels Hemmingsens Gade is a street in the Old Town of Copenhagen, Denmark. The street runs from the western part of Amagertorv in the south to Skindergade in the north, passing Gråbrødretorv on the way. The Church of the Holy Ghost is located on the street. The street is named after the 16th-century Lutheran theologian Niels Hemmingsen.

== History ==
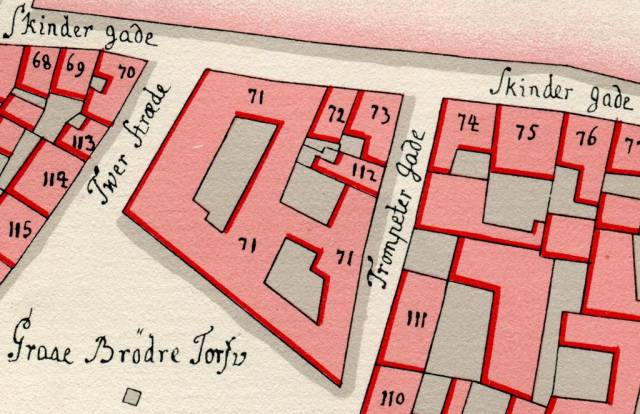
Trompetergade seen on Gedde's district map from 1757

The street has existed since the Middle Ages, but sections of it were originally known under different names. The street section from Amagertorv to Valkendorfsgade, a narrow alley, was called Lille Helliggeiststræde (Little Holy Ghost Street) after the adjacent church. The inclusion of "Little" in the name distinguished it from Store Helliggeiststræde ("Large Holy Ghost Street"), as Valkendorfsgade was then called.

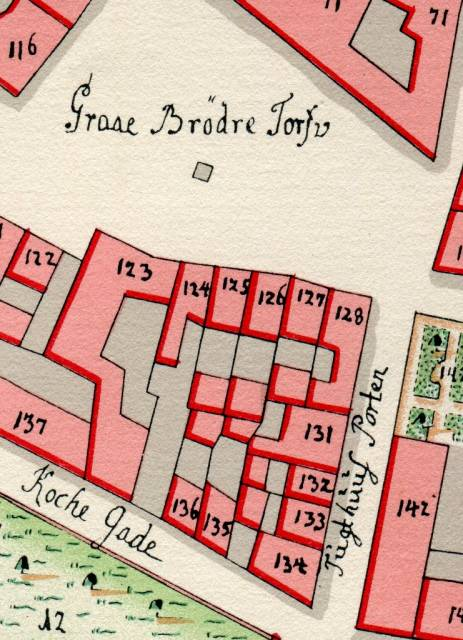
Tugthusporten seen on Gedde's district map from 1757

The section of present-day Niels Hemmingsens Gade which runs from Gråbrødretorv to Skindergade was called Trompetergangen or Trompetergade after Ambrosius Løffelman, a trumpeter who owned property at the site.

The short section from Valkendorfsgade to Gråbrødretorv (Løvgade) was called Tugthusporten (Jailhouse Gate) after a children's jail established at the site by Christian IV but soon moved to Christianshavn (see Women's Prison, Christianshavn). It was a narrow, vaulted passageway which ran through a building. The building had six window bays along the square and two window bays across the street.

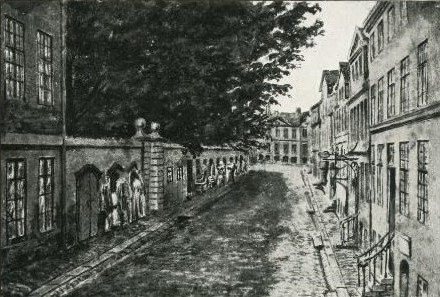
Lille Helliggejststræde seen on a print with the wall that was demolished in 1779

Tugthusporten was merged into Lille Helliggeiststræde in 1843 after complaints from the residents who found the name unappealing. Trompetergade was renamed Store Helliggeiststræde. In 1881, the entire street was renamed Niels Hemmingsens Stræde to commemorate the theologian Niels Hemmingsen.

The churchyard was originally surrounded by a low wall. It was demolished and replaced by an iron fence in 1797.

== Notable buildings ==
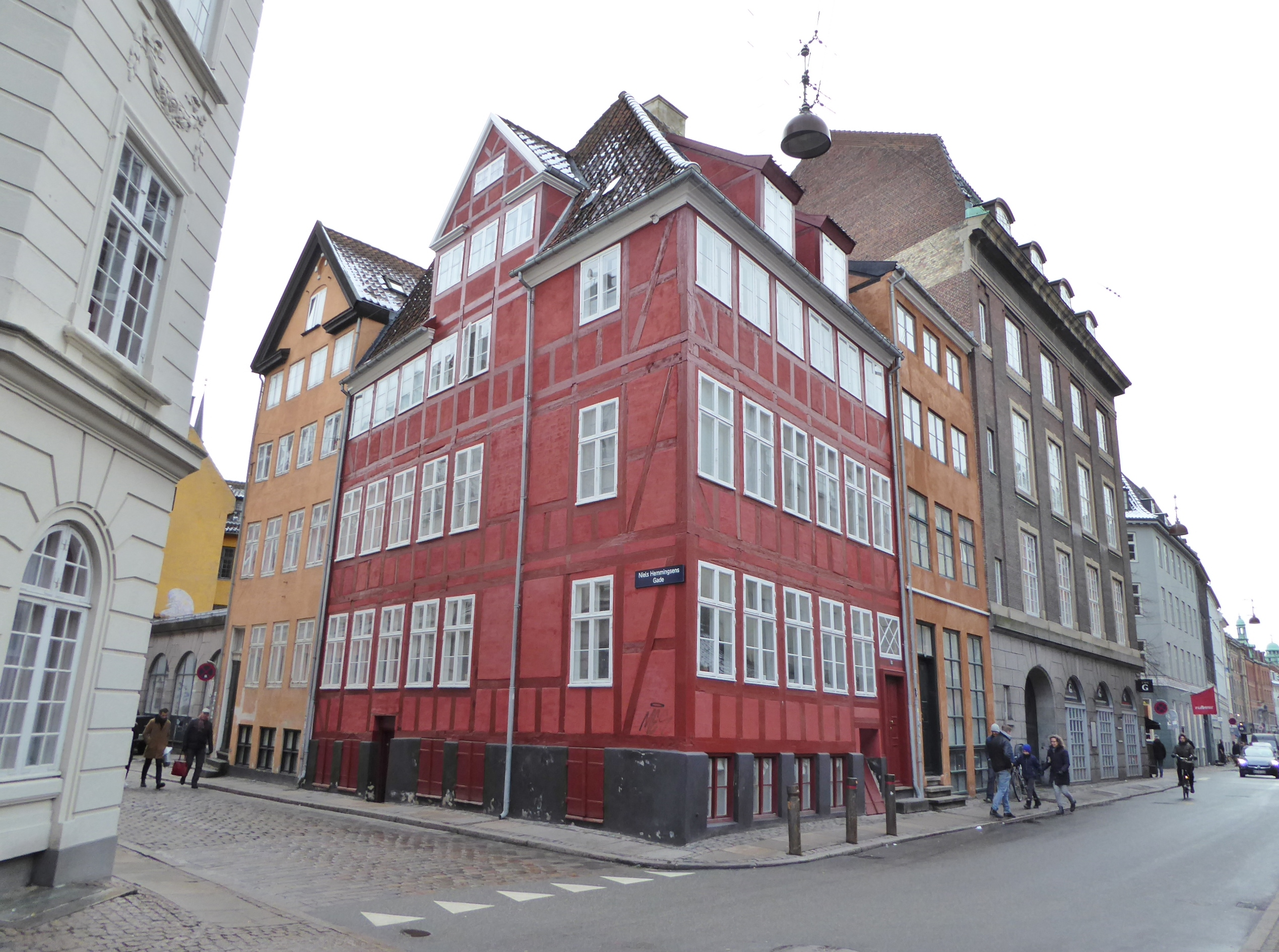
Niels Hemmingsens Gade

The Church of the Holy Ghost and the House of the Holy Ghost both have the address Niels Hemmingsens Gade 5, although they are usually entered through one of two gates on Amagertorv. The House of the Holy Ghost is now used as an exhibition space.

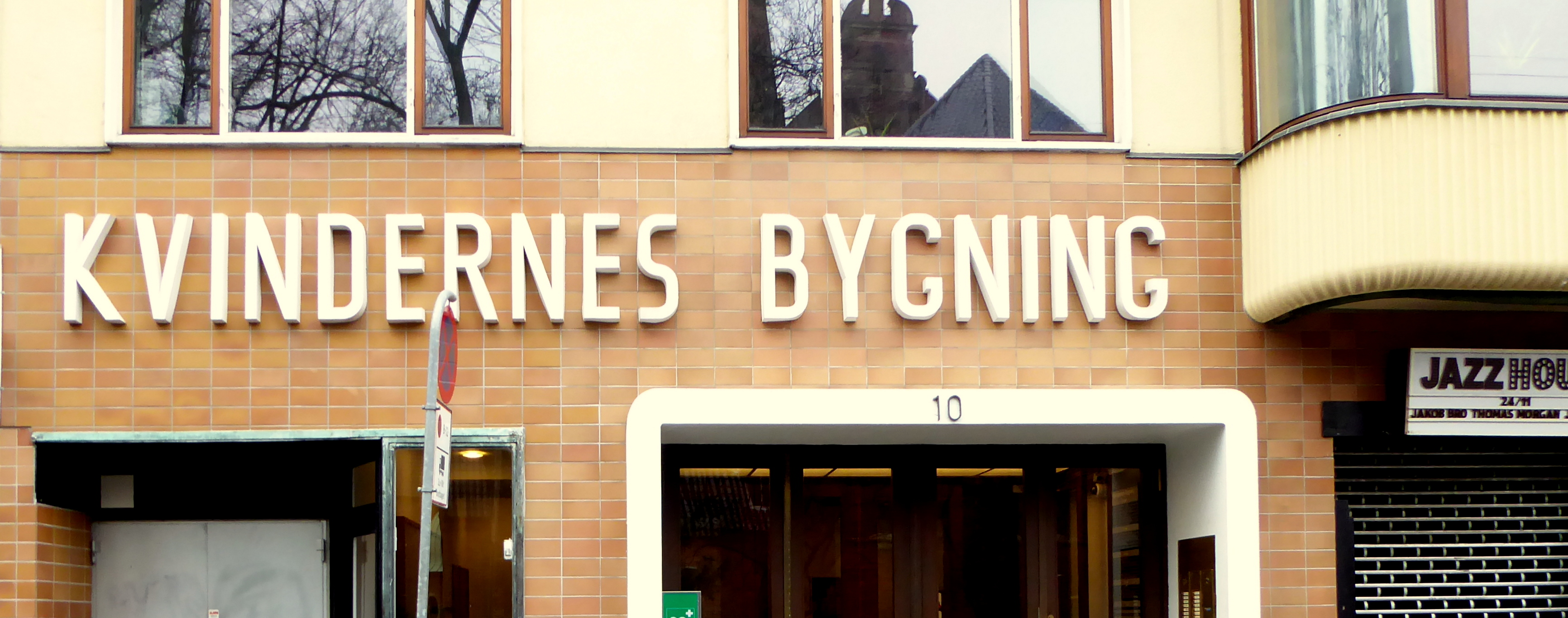
No. 8–10: The Women's Building

The Women's Building (Kvindernes Bygning) at No. 8–10 was built in 1935 in a Functionalist style by architect Ragna Grubb. The music venue Jazzhouse is located in the building.

The buildings at No. 1, 3, 15, 23, and 32 date back to the 18th century and are listed as heritage properties.

No. 24 (Niels Hemmingsensgade 24/Løvstræde 7) is a former hospitality school. The building was designed by Vilhelm Klein and H. C. Stilling. The school has now moved to Vigerslev Allé in Valby.

The large building complex at No. 21 which continues along Kejsergade and Skindergade was built between 1904–1905 to design by Valdemar Ingemann. Ingemann also designed the building at No. 32–34. It is now known as Pressens Hus.

The building at the corner of Løvstræde (No. 24 ( Løvstræde 7) is the former headquarters of Sparekassen for Kjøbenhavn og Omegn.

== Public art and memorials ==
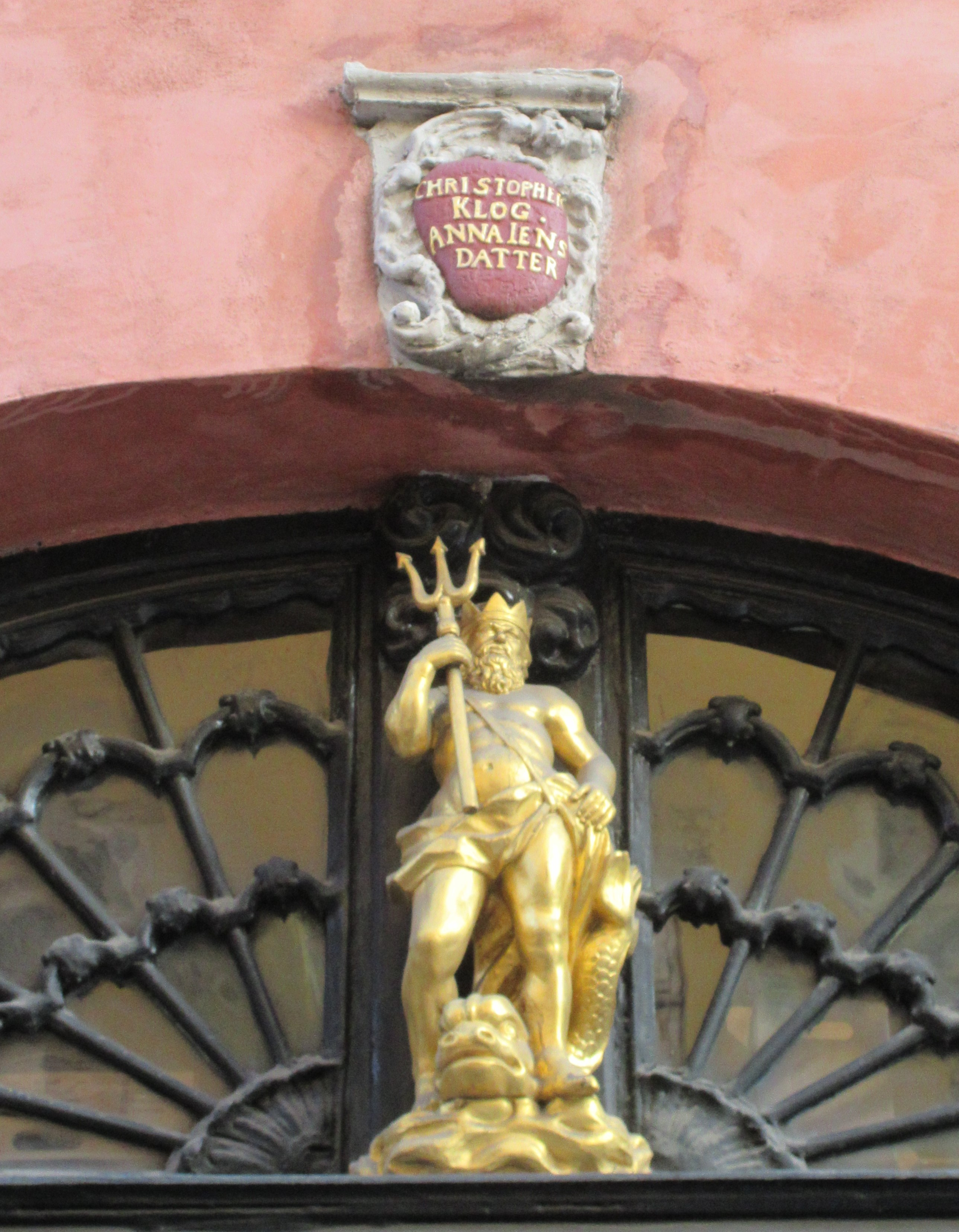
No. 32: Neptune figure and keystone with inscription above the gate

At No. 2, on its centered corner with Amagertorv, between the first and second floors, is a plaque commemorating that Herluf Trolle and Birgitte Gøye owned a property at the site. It mentions that they founded Herlufsholm School on 23 May 1565 and that Trolle died one month later in the house at the site.

The Keystone above the gate to No. 32 features the names Christopher Klog and Anna Jensdatter. Below the stone is a gilded Neptune figure. Klog (1696–1750), a merchant and brewer, was also director of Kjøbenhavns Brandforsikring.
