= Sparekassen for Kjøbenhavn og Omegn =

Historic building in Copenhagen, Denmark

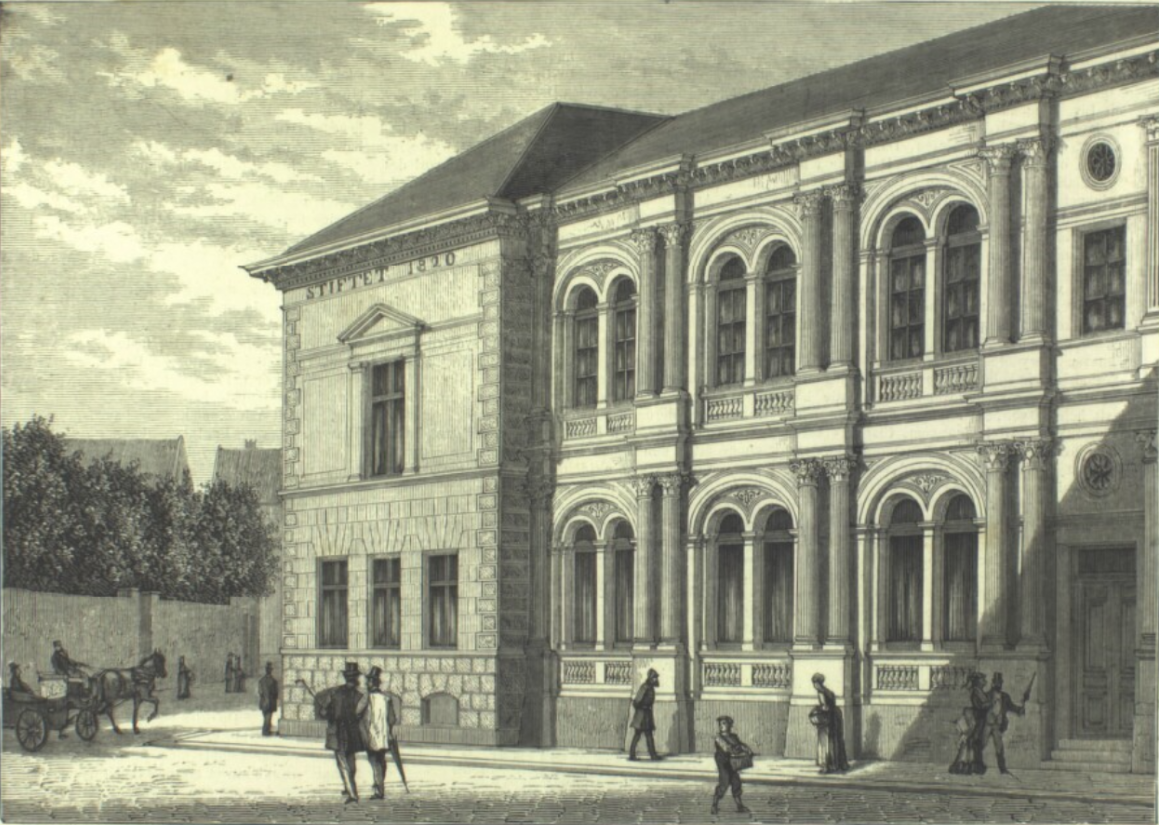
The savings bank's former headquarters in Niels Hemmingsens Gade

Sparekassen for Kjøbenhavn og Omegn (lit. 'The Savings Bank for Copenhagen and Its Vicinity') was a local savings bank in Copenhagen, Denmark. Its headquarters was from 1870 located at the corner of Niels Hemmingsens Gade (No. 24) and Løvstræde (No. 8). The building later housed the Danish Hotel and Restaurant School, and is now home to a Paustian flagship store.

== History ==
Sparekassen for Kjøbenhavn og Omegn was founded on 1 May 1820 by secretary in the General Customs Chamber and Commerdekollegiet H. Bech, Jonas Collin, J. P. Mynset, P. Møller, mayor F. C. Schäffer and priest at Trinitatis Church J. L. Paludan.

== Building ==
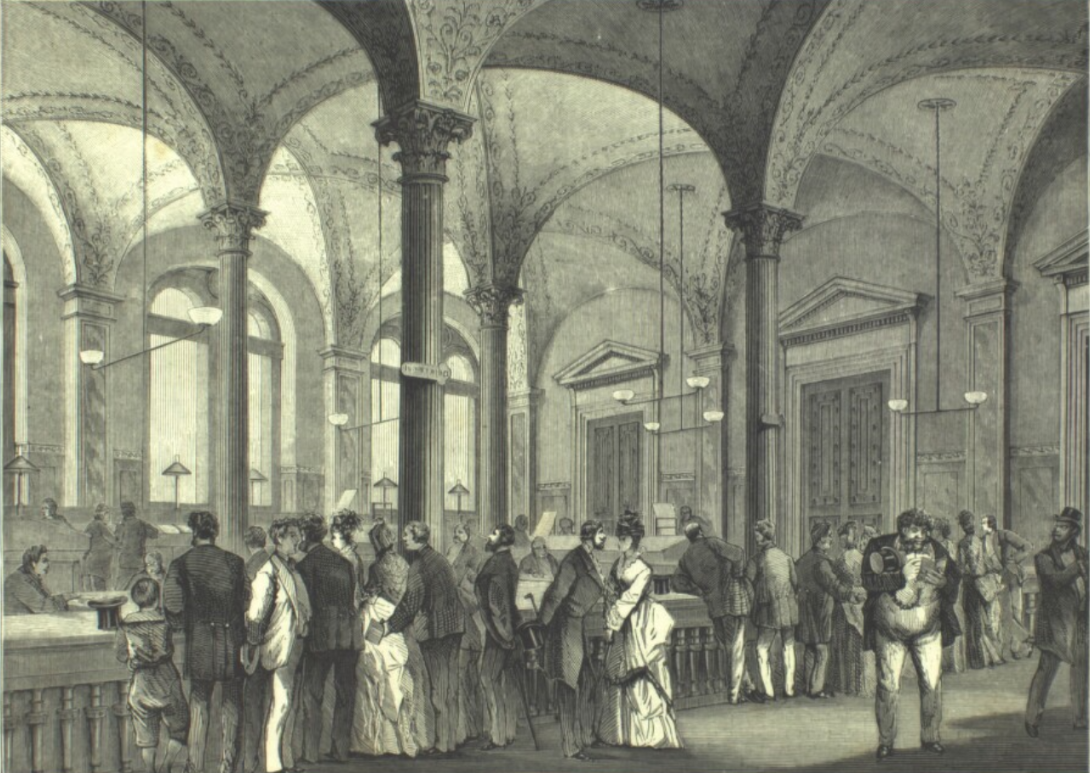
The interior of the building in Niels Hemmingsens Gade

The savings bank was initially based in the new City Hall on Nytorv 9. It was later based in Frederiksholms Kanal and Rådhusstræde.

The savings bank purchased a building at the corner of Niels Hemmingsens Gade (No. 24) and Løvstræde (No. 7) in 1864. The building was in 1866–1868 adapted for use as new bank headquarters by architects Vilhelm Klein (1835–1913) and Hans Conrad Stilling (1815–1891). It was inaugurated on 18 November 1870. The building was by the same architects who expanded Valkendorfsgade in 1872–1873 and again in 1879. Another refurbishment of the building took place in 1911–1913 under supervision of the architects Albert Oppenheim (1879–1956) and Hans Wright (1854–1925).

== Legacy ==
The savings Bank was later merged with other savings banks under the name SDS, which was in turn merged into Unibank and later Nordea. These banks operated a branch in the building in Niels Hemmingsensgade until 2003. The building was then taken over by the Danish Hotel and Restaurant School. It is now home to a Paustian flagship store.
