= House of the Holy Ghost, Copenhagen =

Historic townhouse in Copenhagen, Denmark

House of the Holy Ghost
- Helligåndshuset
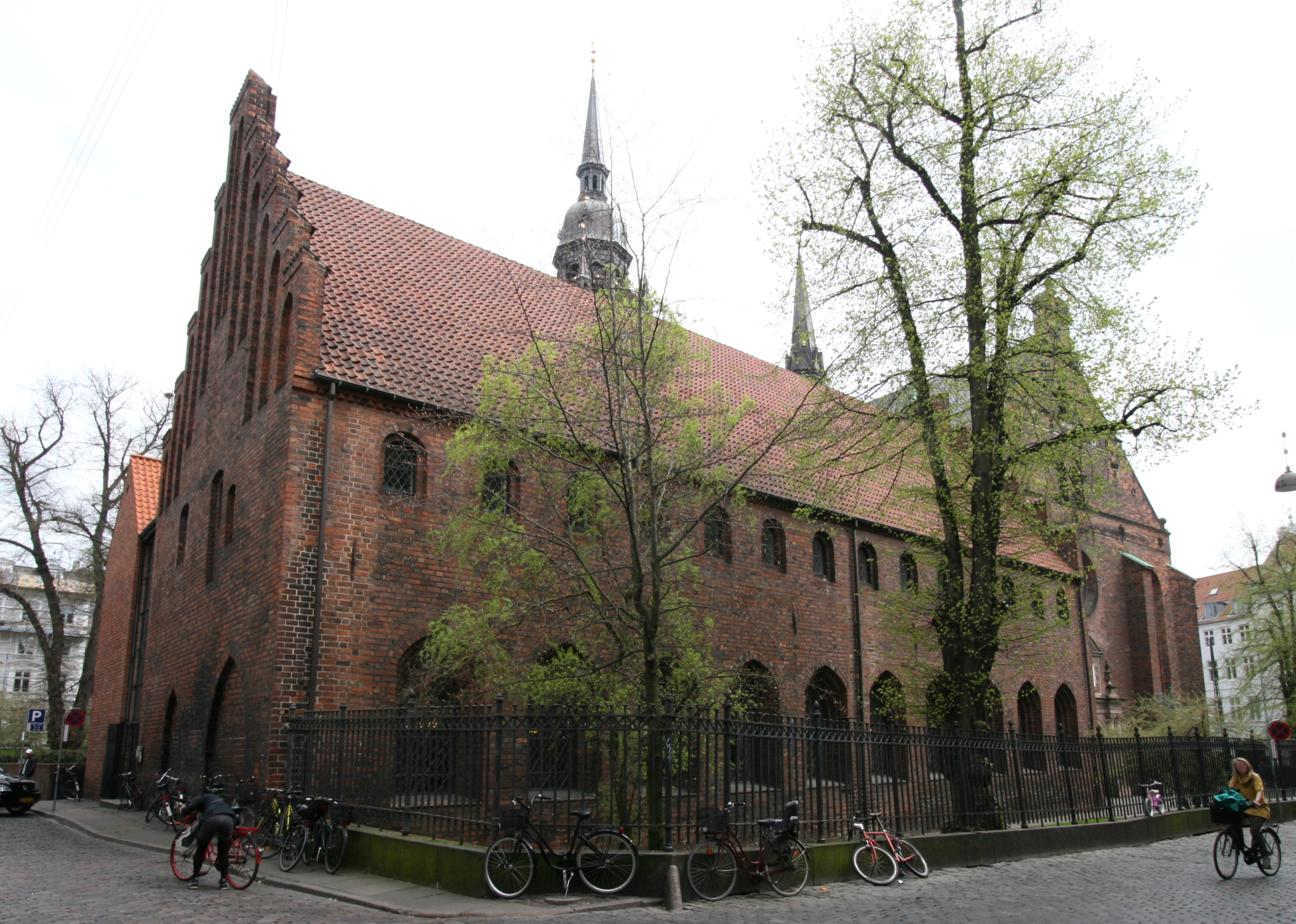
- Interactive map of the House of the Holy Ghost area

General information
- Location: Copenhagen, Denmark
- Coordinates: 55°40′45″N 12°34′35″E

The House of the Holy Ghost (Danish: Helligåndshuset; Latin: Domus sancti spiritus Hafnis)) in Copenhagen, Denmark, is a historic building owned by the adjacent Church of the Holy Ghost. It is let out for art exhibitions, bazaars, vintage book Dutch auctions, chamber music concerts and other events. Built in 1296, it is one of the oldest surviving buildings in Copenhagen. It was listed in the Danish registry of protected buildings and places. It was part of the largest medieval hospital in Denmark, which King Christian I turned into an Augustinian priory in 1497.

== History ==
=== Hospital ===
The Hospital of the Holy Ghost was founded in 1296 near Franciscan Friary by the Bishop of Roskilde, Johannes Krag, under the name 'Copenhagen's Hospital'. Bishop Krag was member of the powerful Krag-Hvide noble family. For its support a ground rent was assessed all properties in Copenhagen which had not already paid the tax. The hospital's purpose was to gather up the poor and sick and feed and care for them. After the imposition of the original ground rent, the hospital sent out petitioners to solicit alms for the upkeep and operation of the hospital.

As was the case with St. Clare's Hospital, the Hospital of the Holy Ghost was operated by a quasi-religious brotherhood which lived a religious life and cared for the residents. Local priests were assigned to see to the spiritual welfare of the people who lived and worked at the hospital. The monastic rule of the brotherhood most closely resembled that of the Knights of St. John. In time the name was changed to Holy Ghost House (Danish: Helligåndshus). Common people came to refer to it as 'Holy Ghost's', (Danish: Helliggestes), the pronunciation coming from the countless German merchants who frequented the city.

Over the centuries, families donated properties to the hospital for its maintenance. By the 15th century, it had income from several such properties. Sometime before 1449, the hospital had its own church and bath house.

In 1472, King Christian I took the hospital, and all its properties, contents, and its brothers and sisters under his protection, most likely because it could no longer support itself. The king invited contributions from throughout Denmark for the assistance to the poor and sick of Holy Ghost House.

=== Abbey ===
In 1474 Christian I went on pilgrimage to Rome and stopped at the Augustinian Holy Ghost Hospital at Saxia de Urba, Italy. It apparently showed him the advantages of having an established religious order, the Order of the Holy Ghost, to organize and operate a hospital. Pope Sixtus IV issued a bull declaring on Christian's behalf that there was in all of Denmark only one Augustine hospital and in the capital where gathered princes, nobles, and knights there was no place to house or care for abandoned and bastard children and the poor. Therefore will the king permit the improvement and re-foundation of a hospital where the Augustinian Order would prevail.

The space available for the hospital had long been considered to be too small to accommodate the needs of the poor. The hospital had lost its church to a fire and the time had come for a major expansion with the complete support of Christian I In just two years the hospital had more than doubled the space available by tearing down several houses adjacent to the old hospital property. Christian I gave not a penny to the expansion, but used his influence to get others to contribute to his new favorite cause. No information about the rebuilding of the church is known, but it was completed before 1479 when a donation was made by Bernt Hakenberg to the St. Anne's Chapel in it. Queen Dorothea made the single largest contribution on condition that '12 poor sick persons be cared for at all times', going into great detail for the specific care and feeding until each recovered or went the way of all earth. She specifically names her husband's reorganized hospital a monastery.

By 1498 the hospital was in financial difficulties due to the costs of expansion. The Augustine monks who operated it petitioned the pope in 1497 for permission to sell indulgences, which was granted until 1515 when the permission was rescinded except during Easter and then only in places where papal indulgences were not available.

Christian I had also been expanding the Augustinian-run hospital in Malmö, then part of Denmark. In 1517 the pope decided that the two hospitals should share one prior. Hans I and Queen Christina were generous in their gifts to both hospitals. Christian II added an unusual income source by decreeing that shipwreck goods on the Øresund which lay unclaimed were to be sold and the funds sent to the hospital.

=== Reformation ===
In 1527 the city fathers read a publication by Poul Helgesen which decried the conditions at the hospitals and outlined the view that the hospital should be broken up so that the poor were not mixed in with those who had contagious diseases. The sick should be divided into those who had non-contagious diseases and those who has contagious diseases. His views were accepted by those charged with administration of the hospital. A new hospital was planned along those lines.

The plans came to naught because of the fall of the Catholic Church in the 1530s. Even before Denmark became officially Lutheran, the city fathers petitioned the king to separate the hospital from the monastery; in so many words asking that the Augustinian monks be expelled from their combined hospital-priory. They went further to propose that the hospital be given the properties and incomes that had belonged to St Gertrude's Hospital and St Jørgen's Leper Hospital be turned over to Holy Ghost House. A governor was to be appointed by the city fathers. In 1530 the Augustines were sent packing and the hospital became a city institution. Holy Ghost Church became a parish church. Holy Ghost Church was built around the old Hospital Church and contains what is left of the old priory church. The tower of the church has views of Copenhagen.

=== Later history ===
Once the furor of the Count's Feud ended and Christian III came to the throne, there was no money to pay for the new hospital. It was none the less continued until 1707. In that year, Christian IV moved the hospital to the Kongsgård Vartov on the coast north of the city. It was from then on known as Vartov Hospital. Some 30 years later, it was moved to new premises at present-day Trianglen. The old premises on Strandvejen was from then on known as Gammel Vartov (Old Vartov). In 1607 Vartov Hospital took over the leper hospital at St Jørgens Gård.

Most of the Holy Ghost Hospital's buildings and properties were sold or torn down to make room for newer structures. Holy Ghost Church was rebuilt into one the city's most beautiful churches around the existing hospital church.

== See also ==
- Valkendorfsgade
