= Brumleby =

Street in Copenhagen, Denmark

Coordinates: 55.702°N 12.575°E

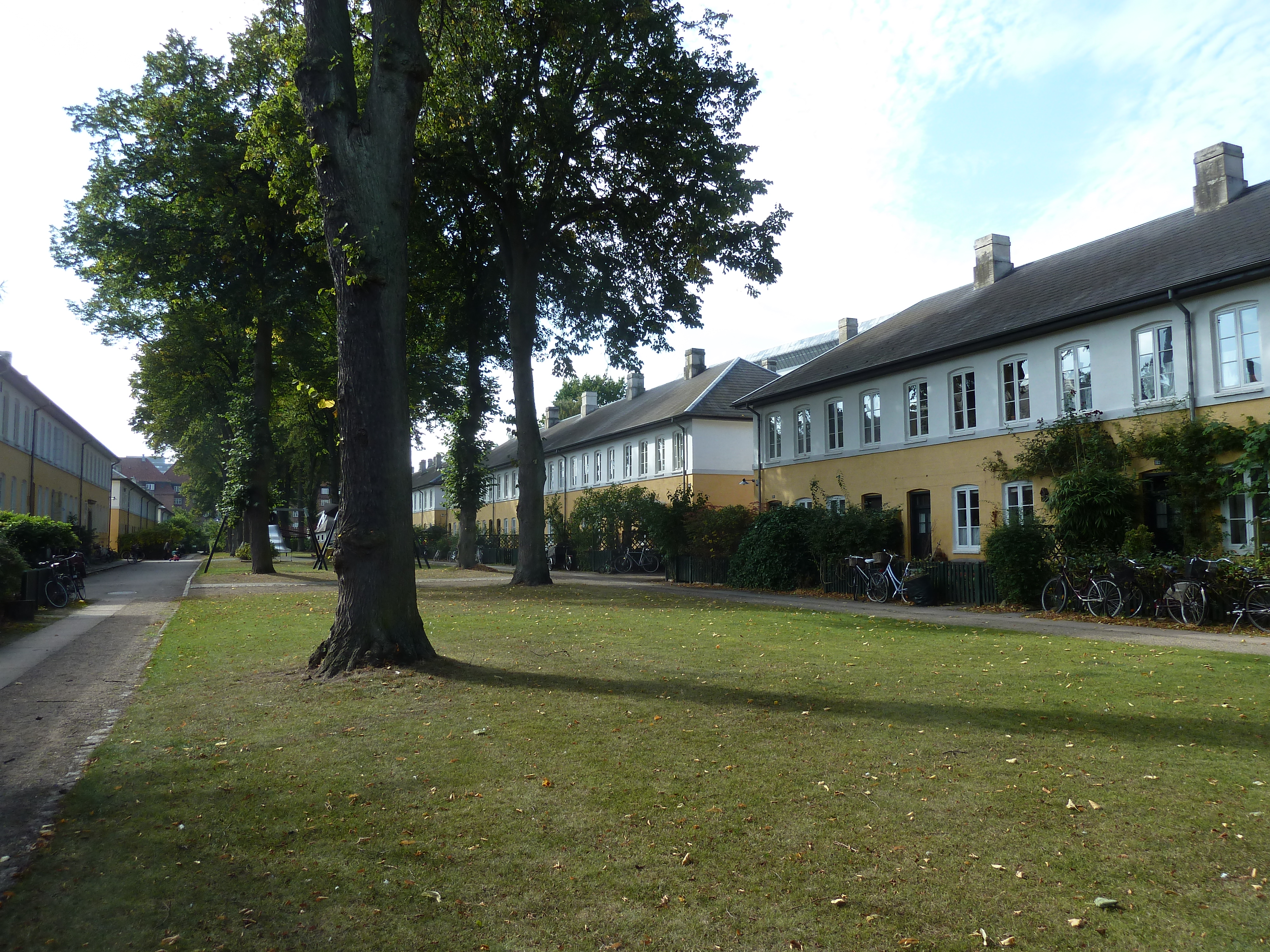
- Brumleby, Copenhagen
- Interactive map of the Brumleby area

General information
- Architectural style: Neoclassical
- Location: Østerbro, Copenhagen, Denmark
- Construction started: 1854
- Completed: 1872
- Client: Danish Medical Association

Design and construction
- Architects: Michael Gottlieb Bindesbøll; Vilhelm Klein

Brumleby is an enclave of terraced houses in Copenhagen, Denmark, located between Øster Allé and Østerbrogade, just south of Parken Stadium and St. James' Church. Built for indigent workers by the Danish Medical Association from 1854 to 1872, it is one of the earliest examples of social housing in Denmark and became a model for later projects.

The development was designed by Michael Gottlieb Bindesbøll in Neoclassical style and later expanded by Vilhelm Klein to a roughly similar design.

== History ==
=== Background ===
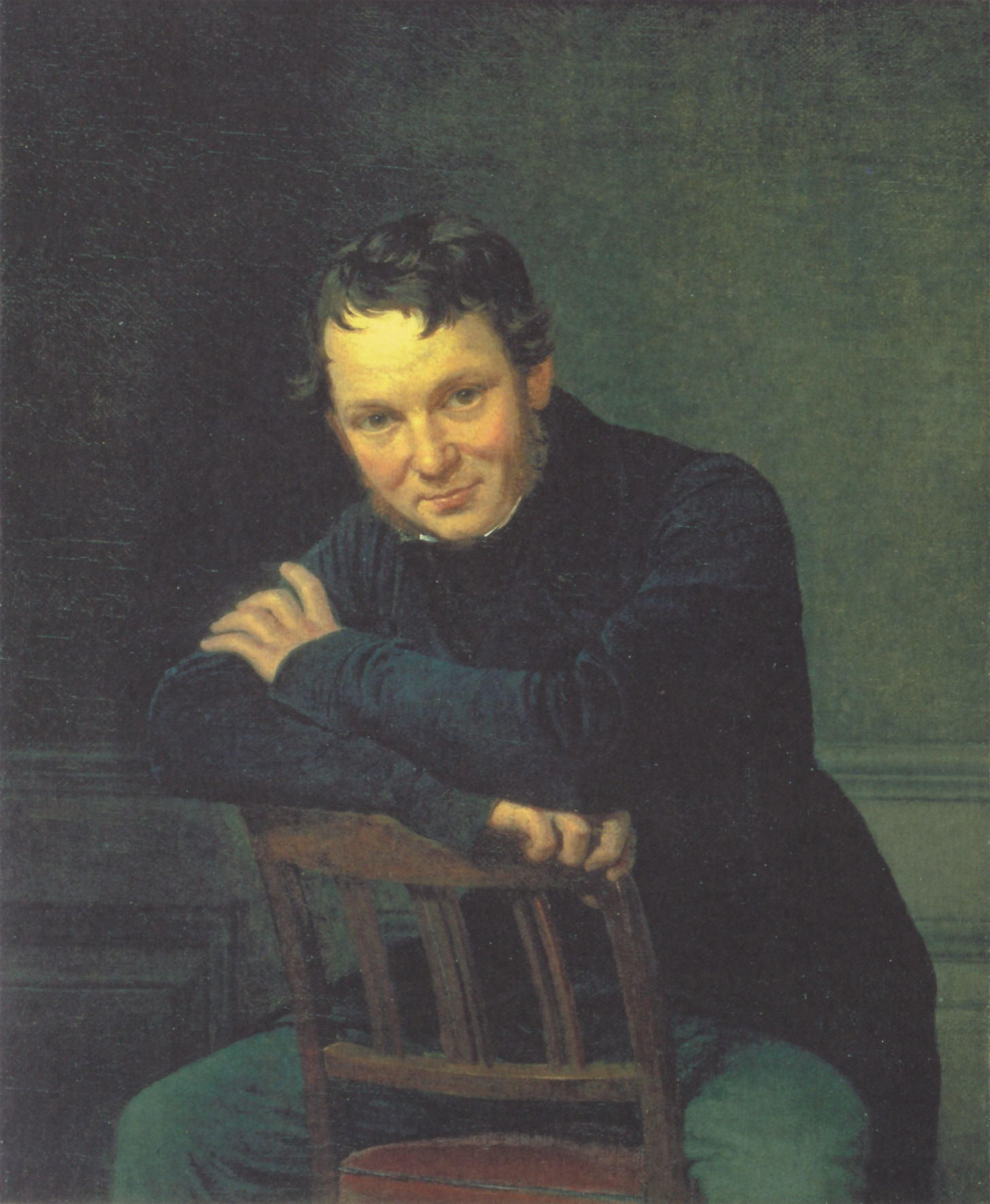
M. G. Bindesbøll

The idea of providing cheap and healthy homes for the poorest part of the city's work force originated among local politicians and medical doctors during the 1853 Copenhagen cholera outbreak which killed approximately 5,000 citizens. A major reason for the outbreak was the dismal conditions in the poorest parts of the city which suffered from overcrowding and lack of proper sanitary services. Copenhagen's population had almost doubled since 1800 but the city had still not been allowed to expand beyond its old fortification ring.

=== Construction phase ===
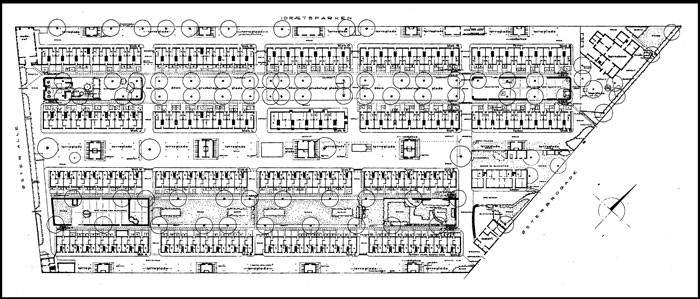
Plan of the area, fully developed

The Danish Medical Association decided to take action, purchasing a piece of land on the Eastern Commons after raising funds privately. The prominent architect Michael Gottlieb Bindesbøll was commissioned to design the houses, Construction began in 1854 and the first stage of the development, with 240 apartments, was inaugurated in 1857.

Due to the intervention of the Second Schleswig War, a planned extension did not begin until 1866. After Bindesbøll's death in 1856, he was replaced by Vilhelm Klein, one of his employees. By the time the second stage was completed in 1872, Brumleby had 550 apartments which housed approximately 2,500 inhabitants.

=== Later history ===
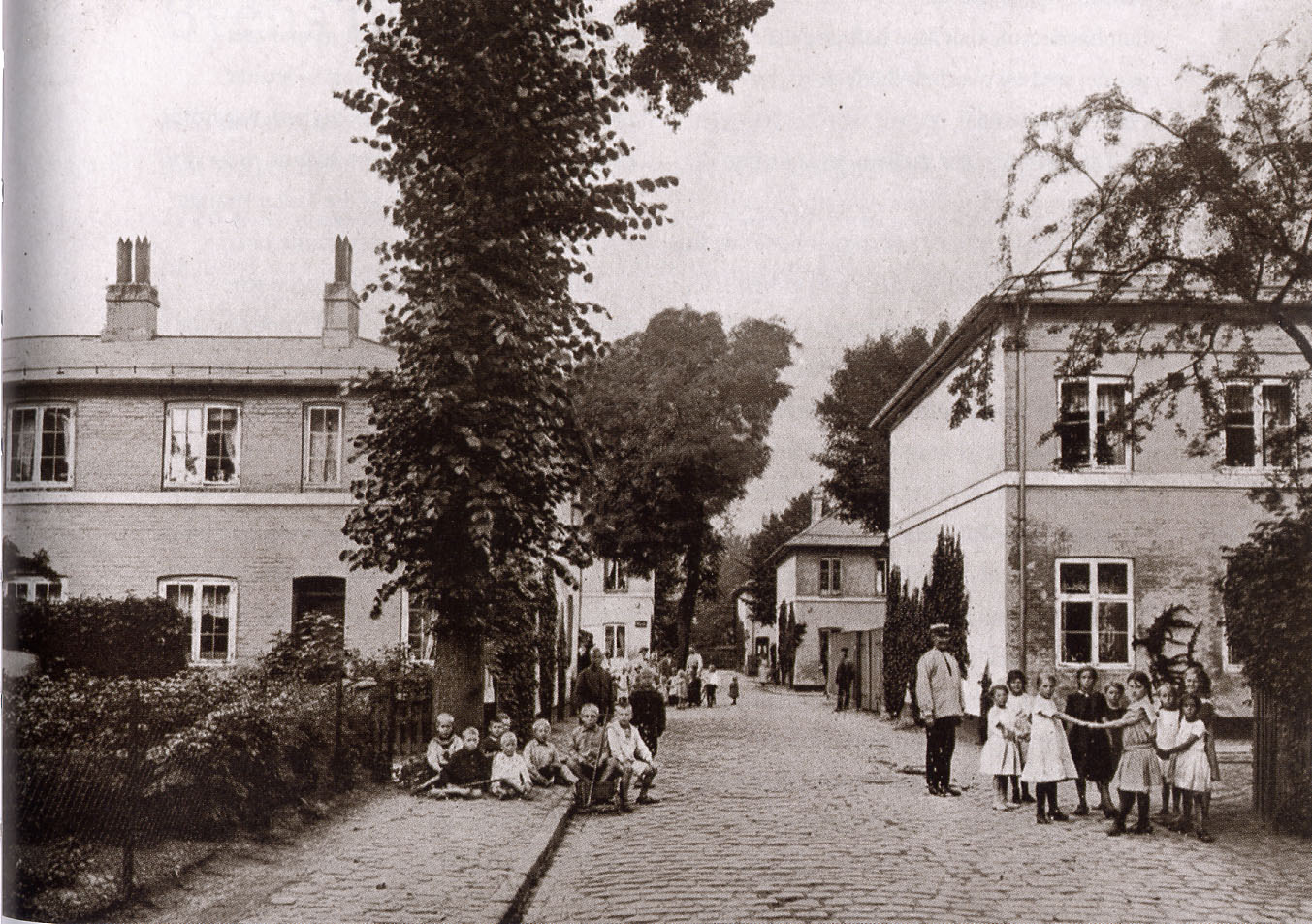
Brumleby in the 1900s

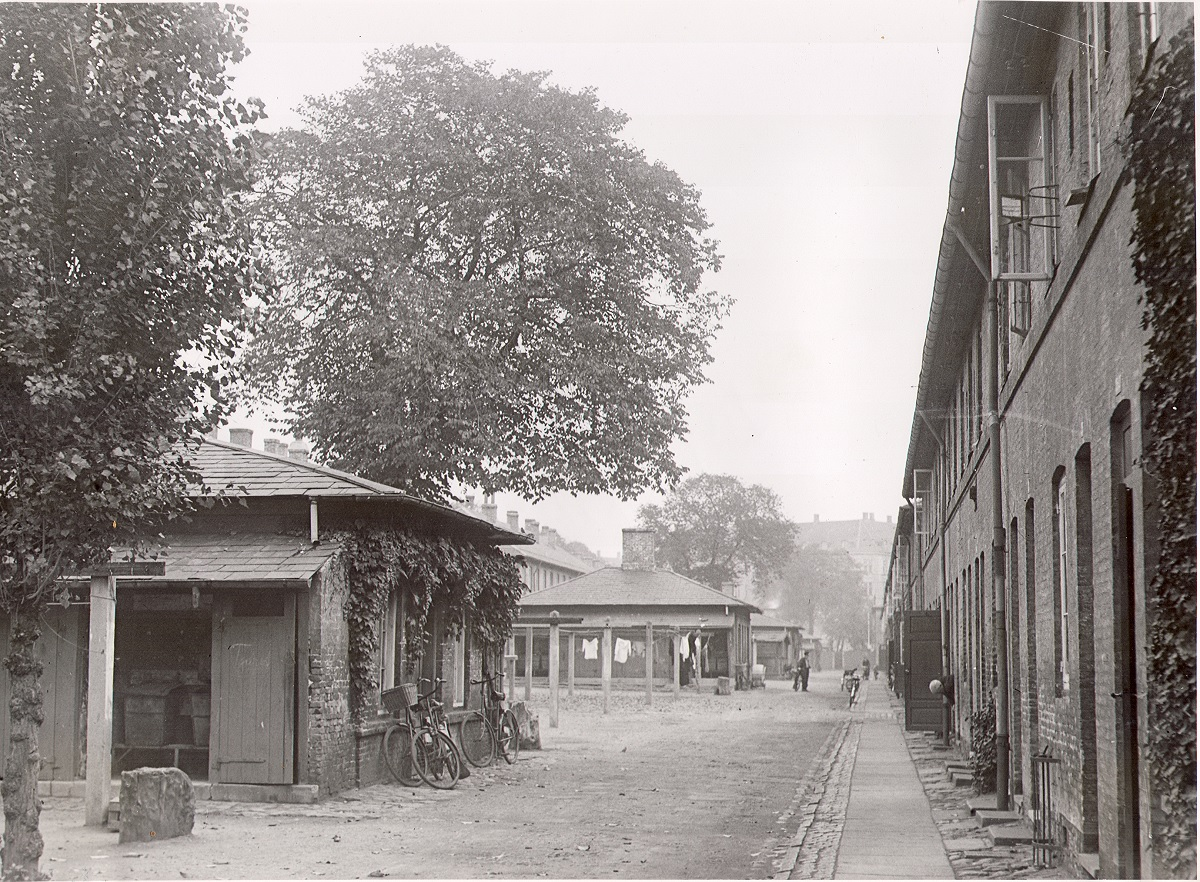
Brumleby in the 1900s

In 1878, still with Klein as the architect, the Medical Association continued its construction of apartments for workers at another site further from the city, next to the Eastern Gasworks, but these were later demolished. Over the years there were also numerous proposals to demolish Brumleby and replace it with more dense housing but in 1959 the area was listed.

== The name ==
The area was not originally known as Brumleby, but simply as Lægeforeningens Boliger (English: The Medical Association's Residences), but the name emerged colloquially towards the end of the 19th century and obtained official status in 1984. The prefix Brumle-, in the beginning also seen as Brumme-, most likely was a reference to the sound from the grazing cattle on the surrounding commons. The suffix -by simply means town or area, as in the English 'by-law' and place-names as such as Grimsby and Derby.

== Architecture ==
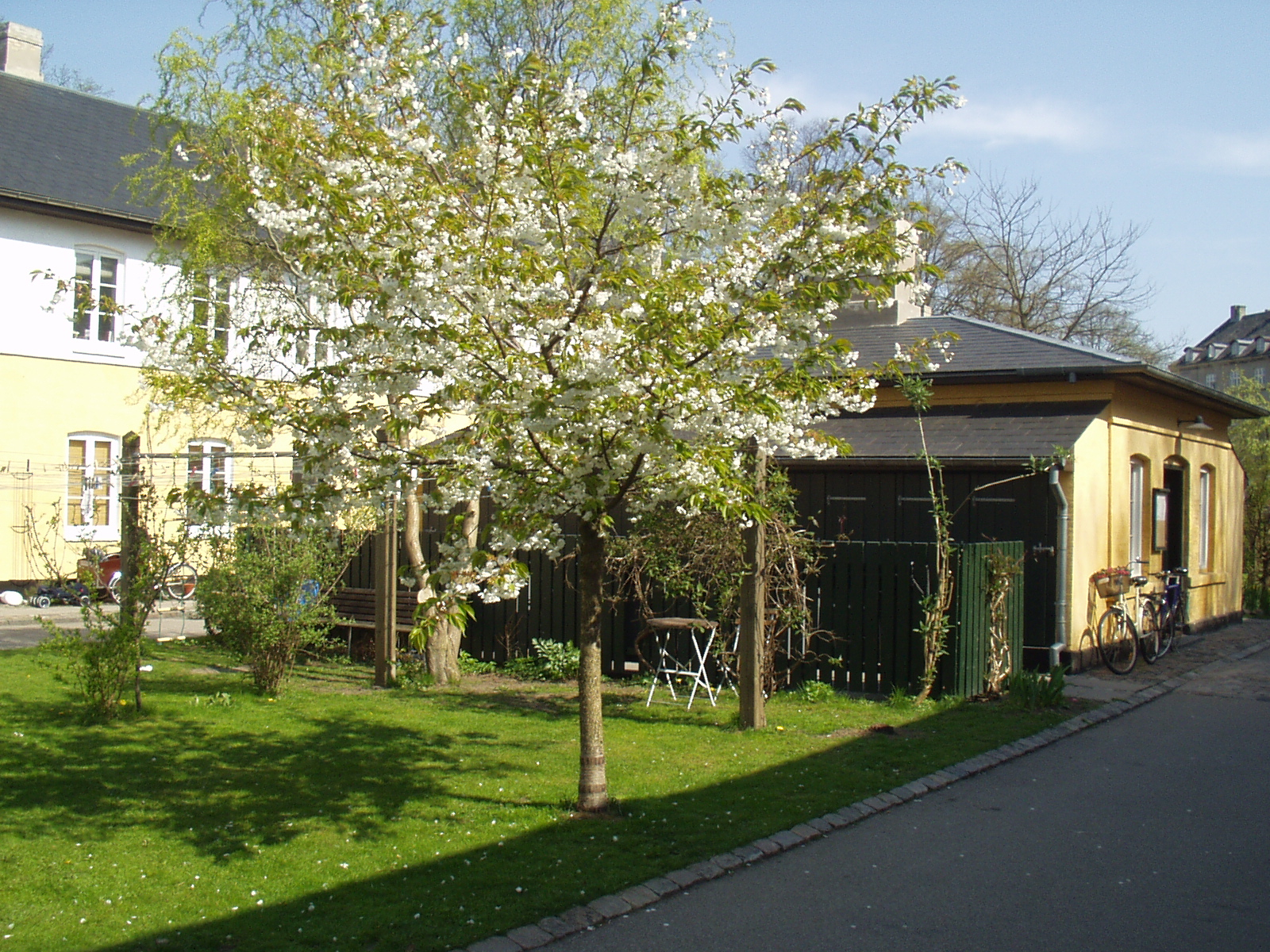
Brumleby

Brumleby consists of four rows of two-storey houses with bicoloured facades, ochre coloured ground floors and white first floors, and slate roofs. The inspiration for the design came from Italian agricultural workers' housing which Bindesbøll had seen during his years in Italy.

The apartments were no larger than those inside the city, just 25 sqm, often for families with many children, but their planning set new standards with its spacious layout, abundant light and fresh air as well as integration of common facilities such as wash houses, co-operative shops, a bath house, workshops and shared spaces.

== Brumleby today ==
Brumleby still serves as social housing, part of Københavns Almindelige Boligselskab. Today, after mergers during a major renovation in the 1990s, the number of apartments has been reduced to 221. The renovation also fitted the apartments with private bathrooms and toilets, before that these facilities were shared.

== Notable residents ==
Ilia Fibiger (1817–1867), writer and Denmark's first professional nurse, lived there with six orphans in the 1860s. The writer Martin Andersen Nexø lived in the area as a child, from 1872 to 1877, and has portrayed it in the 1952 childhood memoires Et Lille Kræ. Mille Dinesen a Danish actress best known for starring in the film Nynne, as well as the title role in the television series Rita.

== See also ==
- Danish Workers' Building Society
- Architecture of Denmark
- Danish Culture Canon
