= Valkendorfsgade =

Street in Copenhagen, Denmark

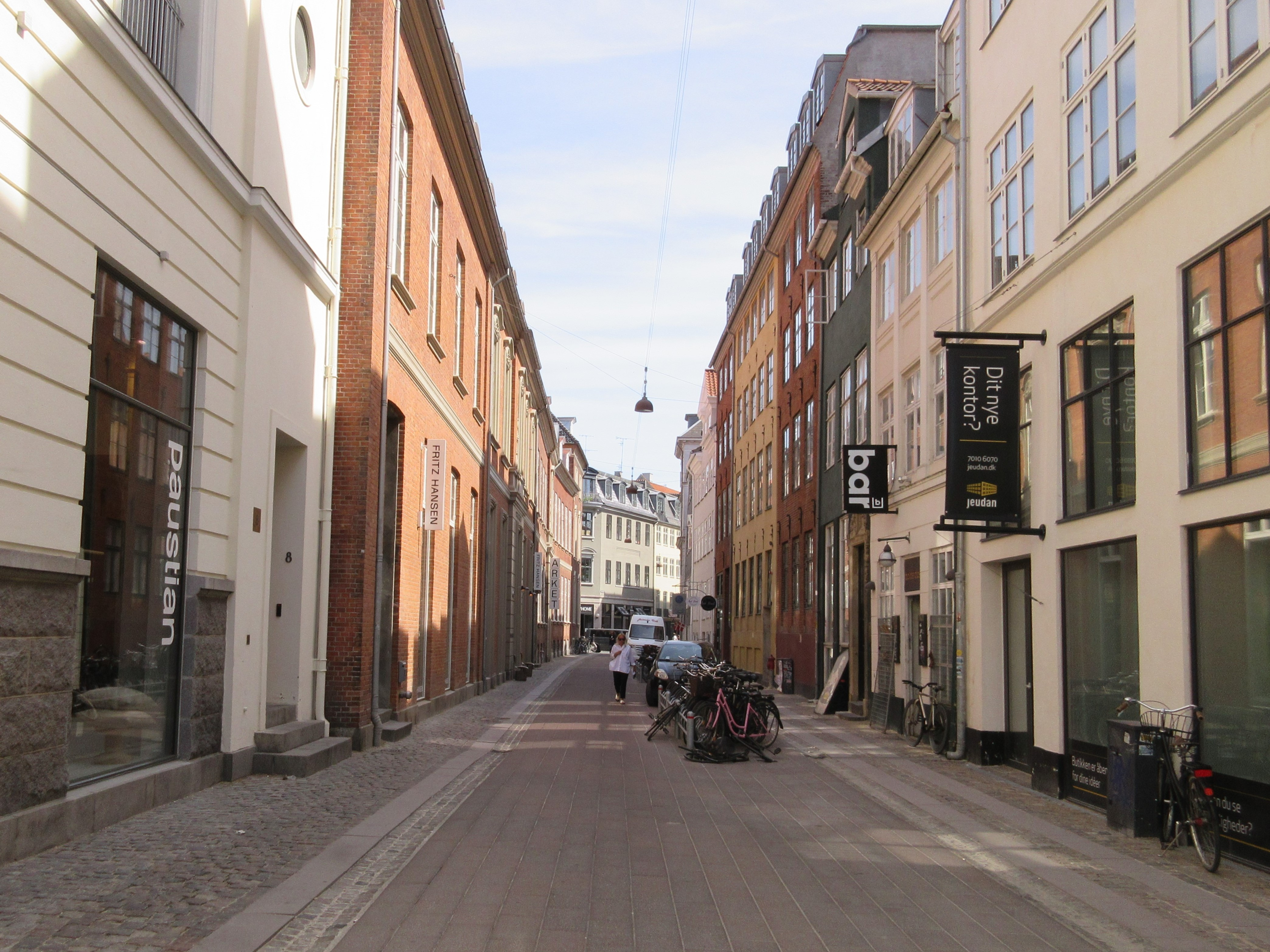
- Interactive map of Valkendorfsgade
- Length: 275 m (902 ft)
- Location: Copenhagen, Denmark
- Quarter: City centre
- Postal code: 1151
- Nearest metro station: Gammel Strand
- Coordinates: 55°40′46.66″N 12°34′37.76″E
- Northeast end: Købmagergade
- Southwest end: Amagertorv

Valkendorfsgad (literally "Valkendorf Street") is a street in the Old Town of Copenhagen, Denmark. It runs from Købmagergade in the northeast to the Church of the Holy Ghost in the southwest where it makes a sharp turn left to join Strøget. The street passes the rear side of the Church of the Holy Ghost. Kringlegangen connects it to the square Gråbrødretorv.

== History ==
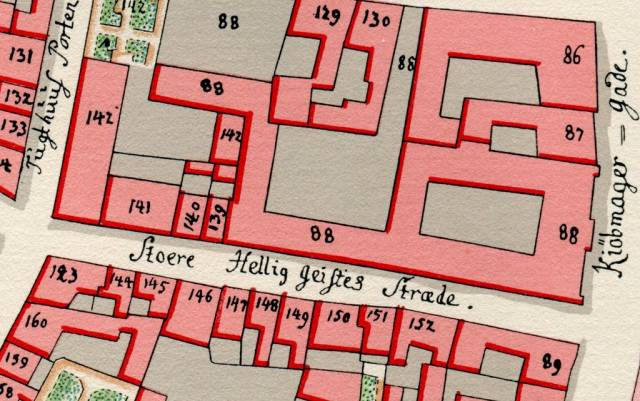
Stoere Hellig Geistes Stræde as seen on Gedde's maps of Copenhagen from 1757

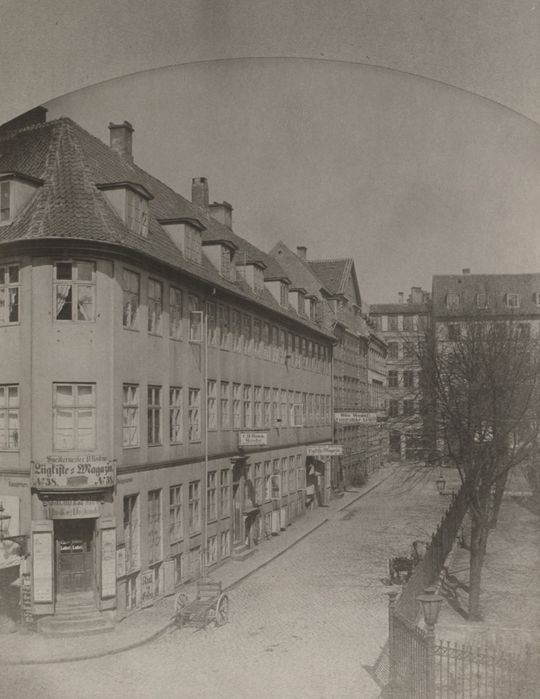
Valkendorfsgade viewed from Strøget some time before 1900

Valkendorfsgade was created after the Copenhagen Fire of 1728. The section from Købmagergade to Niels Hemmingsens Gade was originally called Store Helliggeiststræde (Large Alley of the Holy Hjost). The first part of the name distinguished it from Lille Helliggeiststræde (Small Alley of the Holy Ghost) which was the name of Niels Hemmingsens Gade at that time. The remaining part of the street was called Kokkestræde (Cooks Alley) but became part of Store Helliggeiststræde in 1859. The entire street was renamed Valkendorfsgade in 1881 after Christoffer Valkendorf.

== Notable buildings and resident ==
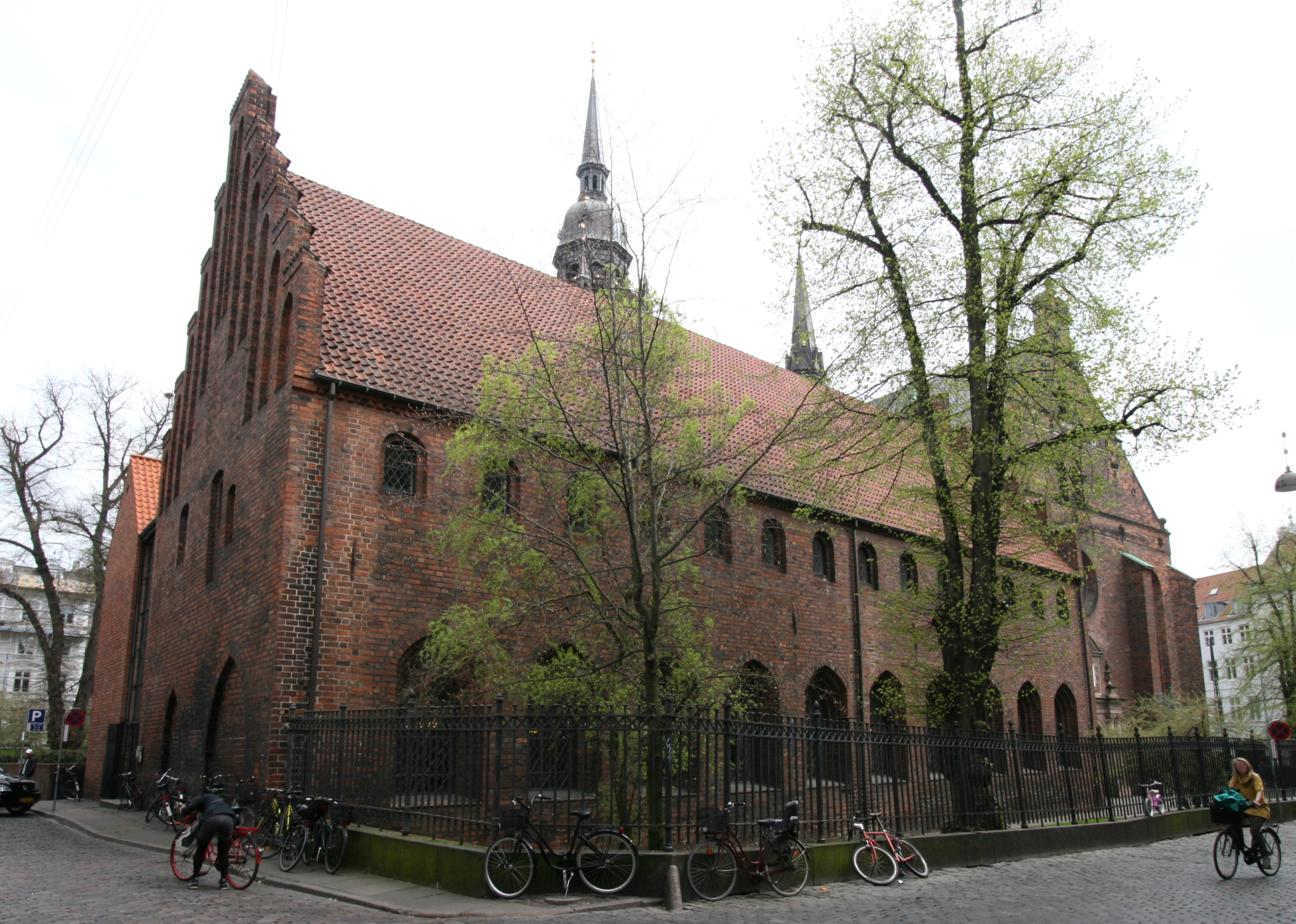
The House of the Holy Ghost

Church of the Holy Ghost is one of the four Medieval Churches in Copenhagen. It was almost completely destroyed in the Copenhagen Fire of 1728 but rebuilt shortly thereafter by J.Johan Cornelius Krieger. The House of the Holy Ghost (Valkendorfsgade 23= is a former hospital.

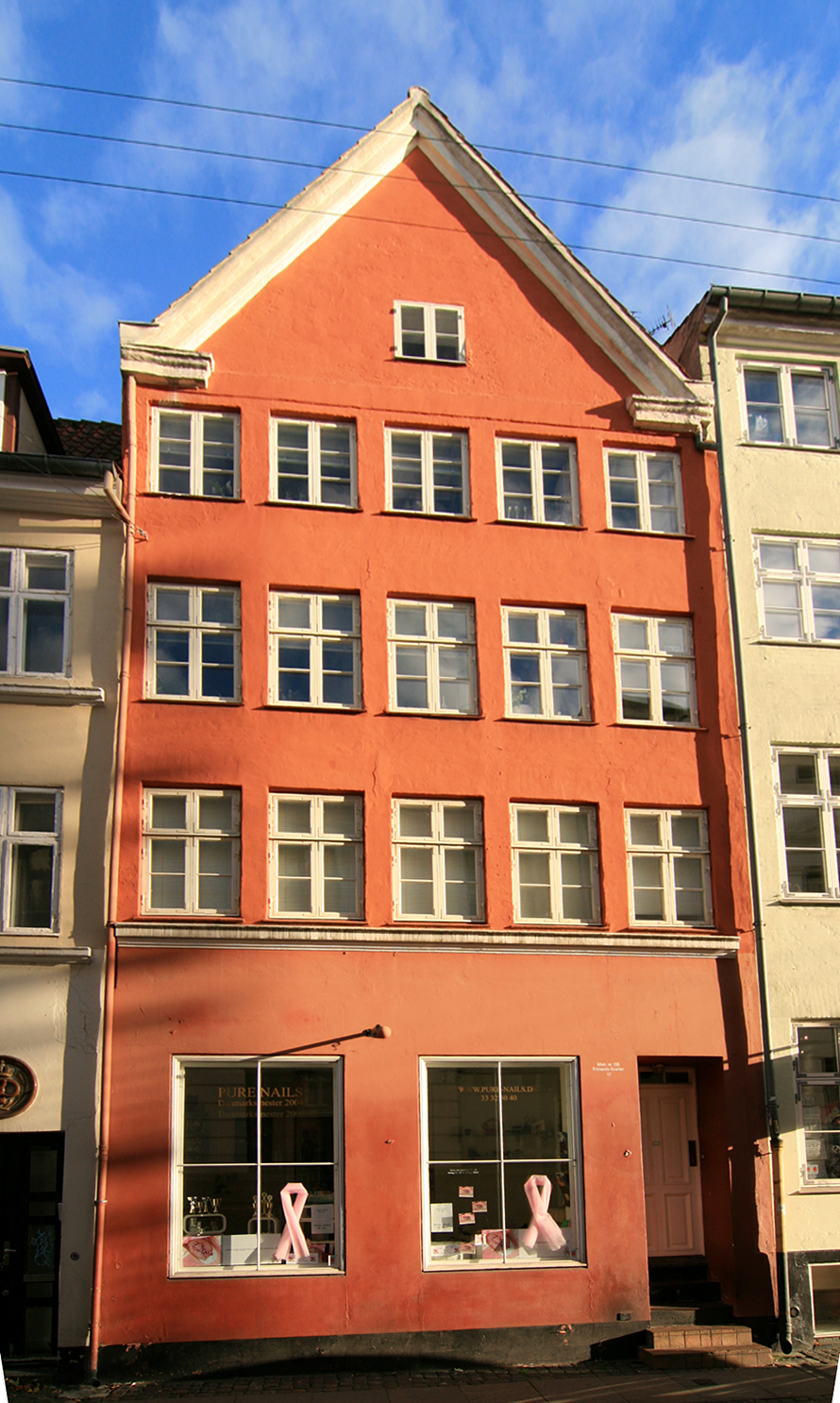
No. 17

No. 2–4 was built for the Telegraph Authority in 1875–76 as an extension to the Royal Mail Building on Købmagergade. The building was designed by Theodor Zeltner in a style that matches the Baroque architecture of the main wing.

No. 3, No. 5, No. 15, No. 17 and No. 36 all date from the first half of the 18th century and are listed. The listed complex at Valkendorfsgade 32 and Gråbrødre Torv 17-17a-b dates from the 1850s and contains a passageway, Kringlegangen, which provides a link between Valkendorfsgade and Gråbrødretorv.

== Transport ==
The nearest metro station is Gammel Strand.

== See also ==
- Asylgade
