= Johannes Krag =

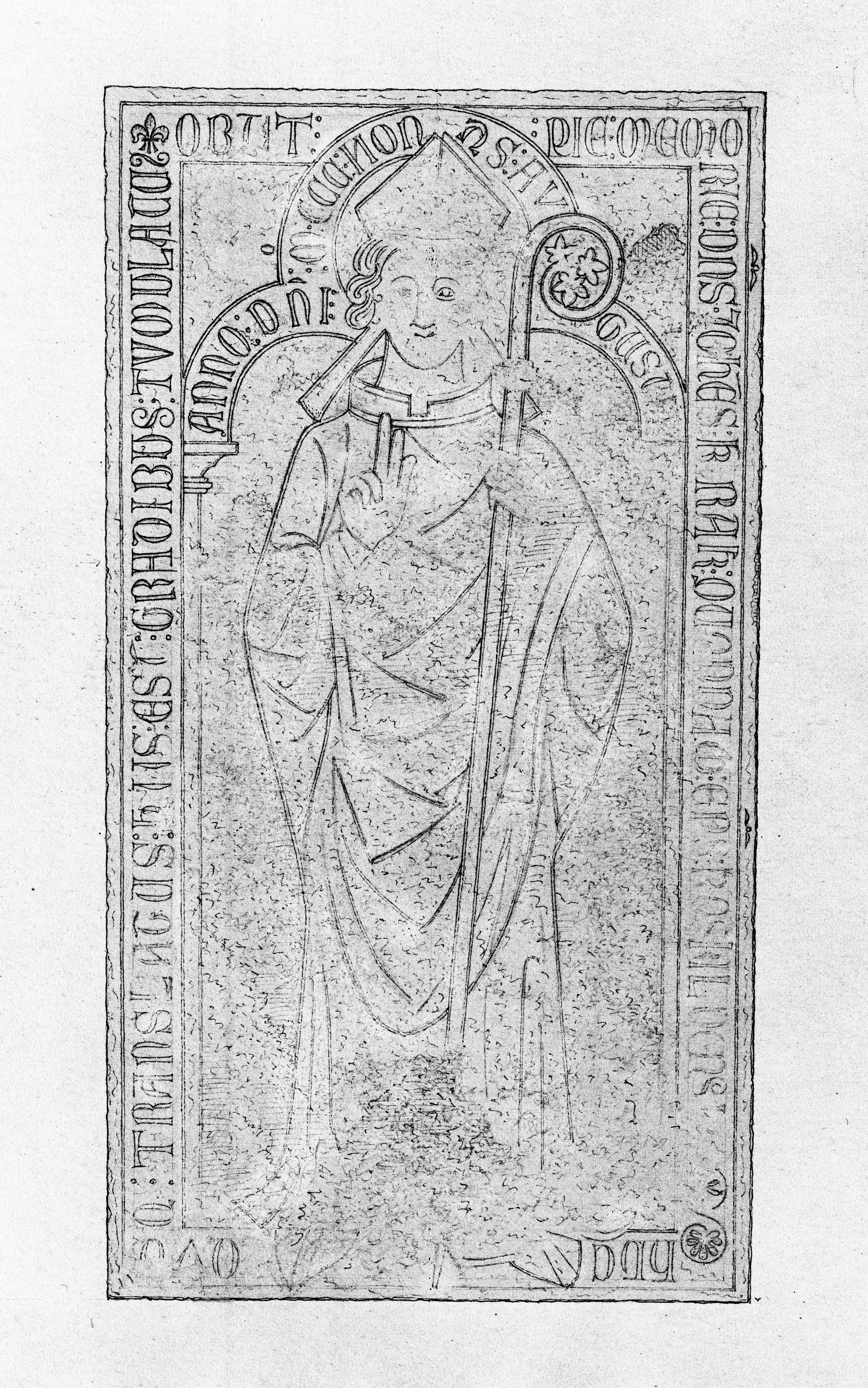
Jens Krag's ledgerstone in Sorø Abby Church.

Johannes (Jens) Krag (5 August 1300) was a Danish clergyman. He served as Bishop of Roskilde from 1290 to 1300. He is buried in Sorø Abbey Church.
