= Church of the Holy Spirit, Copenhagen =

Coordinates: 55.6790°N 12.5769°E

Church of the Holy Spirit
- The Parish Church of the Holy Spirit
- Helligåndskirken
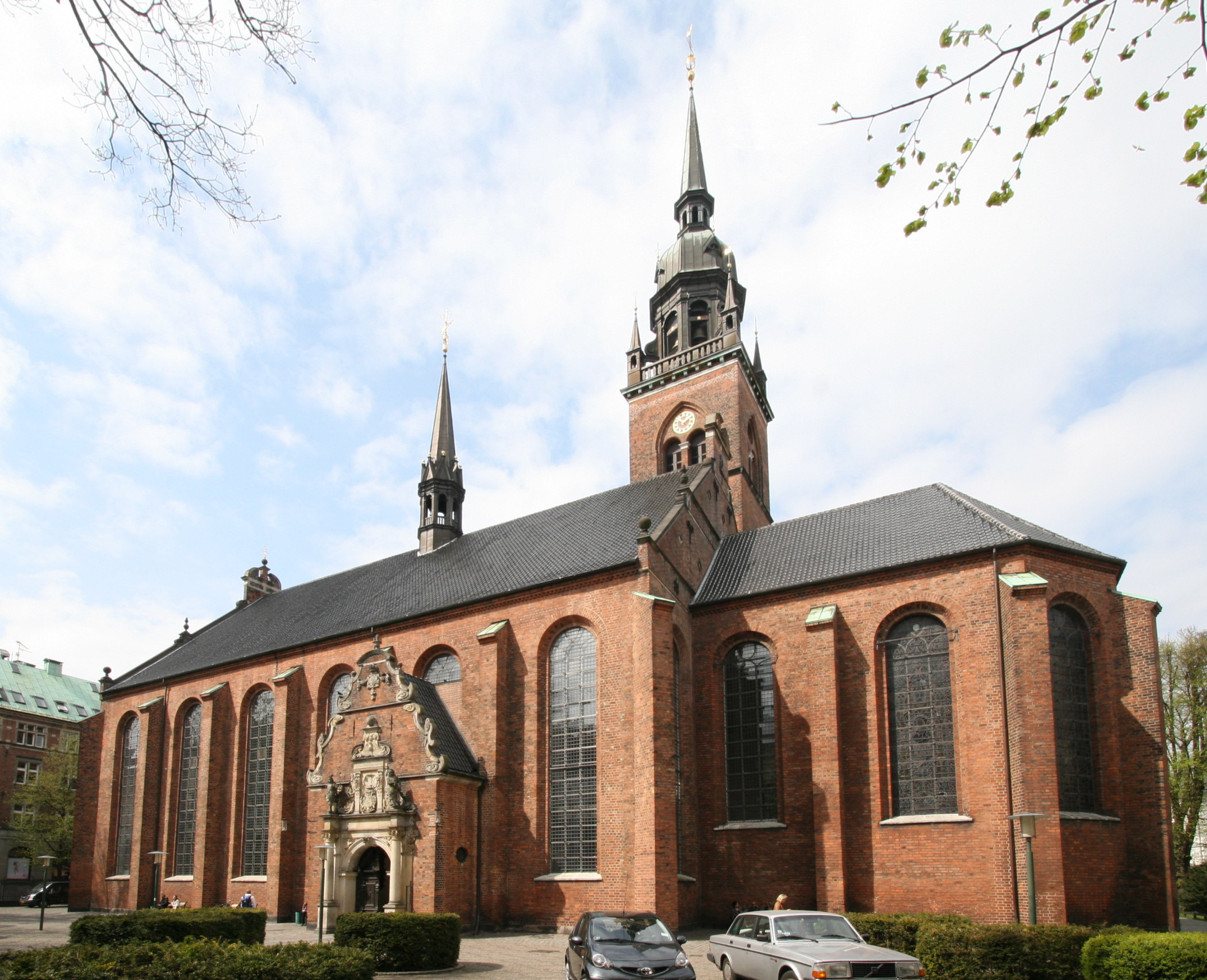
- Church of the Holy Spirit
- Location: Copenhagen
- Country: Denmark
- Denomination: Church of Denmark
- Website: Church website

History
- Former name: The Abbey of the Holy Spirit
- Status: Active
- Founded: 13th century
- Dedication: Holy Spirit

Architecture
- Functional status: Parish Church

Administration
- Diocese: Copenhagen

Clergy
- Bishop: Peter Skov-Jakobsen
- Vicar: Leif G. Christensen
- Priest(s): Jens Biegel-Fogh; Niels Jørgen Cappelørn; Jens-Kristian Kleist; Agnete Holm

The Church of the Holy Spirit (Danish: Helligåndskirken) in Copenhagen, Denmark is one of the city's oldest churches.

== History ==
=== Background ===
The first abbey in Copenhagen was a Franciscan monastery founded in 1238, just 12 years after the death of Francis of Assisi. Prior to that, Archbishop Eskil had founded two Cistercian monasteries, Esrom Abbey and Herrevad Abbey. Typically for the order, they had been founded at more remote locations in Northern Zealand and Skåneland. At first, the new institution in Copenhagen was more of a hostal and workshop for travelling monks than a monastery proper. It was expanded on a number of occasions and remained the only monastery and a central part of the city's life for the next 250 years.

=== Hospital of the Holy Spirit ===
In 1296, a hospital was built by Roskilde Bishop Johannes Krag who was member of the powerful Krag-Hvide noble family. Johannes Krag's strict rule over the city had brought its population to an uprising. They attempted to storm Bishop's Palace at Slotsholmen and as part of a settlement, Krag agreed to build what was known as a House of the Holy Ghost. Such houses were facilities which cared for the sick, the poor and the old, more refuges for the weak and disabled than hospitals in the modern sense of the word.

The construction of the new building was to be paid for by the bishop and the citizens in equal shares. For its support, an annual ground rent was assessed all properties. Over the years, the hospital also received its own endowments, mainly of property, which provided income for its support. Next to the hospital a small church was built although it is not known exactly when it was added to the complex.

=== The abbey ===
In 1469, King Christian I transformed the hospital into an abbey. Later, on his journey to Rome in 1474, Pope Sixtus IV acknowledged it as an institution under the Order of the Holy Ghost, with Santo Spirito in Rome as inspiration and mother church.

The abbey consisted of four wings around a courtyard. Of these the present-day church has evolved from the south wing while the House of the Holy Ghost is the former west wing.

Originally the church did not have a tower. Construction of a tower was commenced in 1520 but before long the Reformation brought things to a standstill and in 1530 the abbey was decommissioned.

=== The parish church 1537–1728 ===
After the reformation the church was converted into a parish church. At the initiative of Christoffer Valkendorff, at that time Governor of Copenhagen, work on the tower was resumed in 1582. Brickwork was continued in another bond, making the transition between the old and the new part of the tower easily detectable. The tower was topped by a spire mounted in August 1594. It is attributed to Hans van Steenwinckel the Elder although no clear documentation exists.

=== The parish church 1529–1878 ===
The church burned in the Copenhagen Fire of 1728.
