= Moses Melchior =

Moses Melchior may refer to:

- Moses Marcus Melchior (1736–1817), Jewish-Danish merchant
- Moses Melchior (businessman) (1825–1912), Jewish-Danish merchant, his grandson

== See also ==
- Moses & Søn G. Melchior
