= Gråbrødretorv 7 =

Townhouse in Copenhagen, Denmark

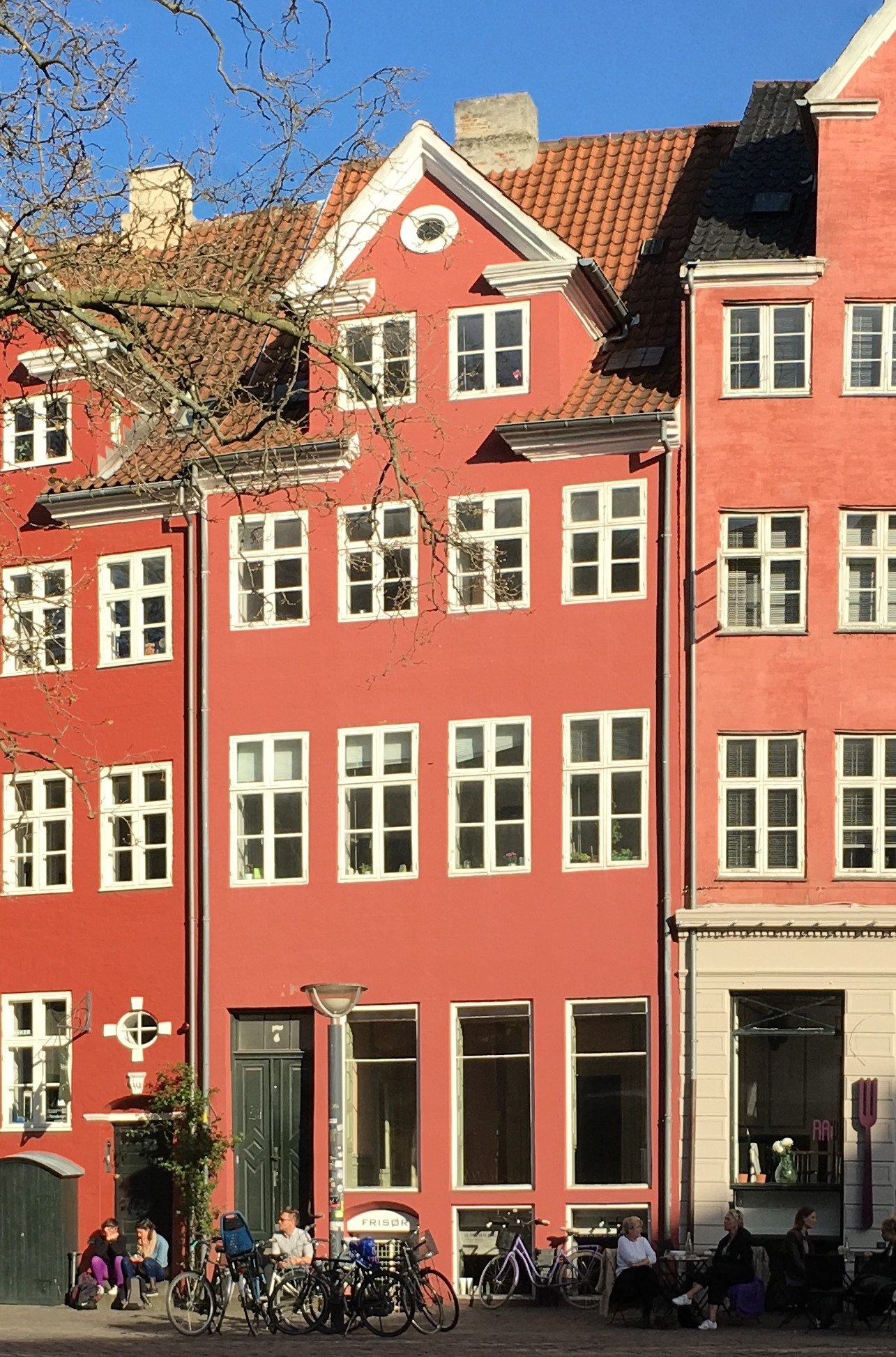

General information
- Architectural style: Neoclassical, Baroque
- Location: Copenhagen, Denmark
- Coordinates: 55°40′47.17″N 12°34′34.5″E
- Completed: 1732

Gråbrødretorv 7 is a Baroque style townhouse situated on the south side of Gråbrødretorv in the Old Town of Copenhagen, Denmark. It is a typical example of the so-called "fire houses" which were constructed throughout the city following the Copenhagen Fire of 1728. The property was acquired by the Jewish merchant Moses Melchior and a business partner in 1783 and remained in the hands of the Melchior family until at least the 1840s. It was listed in the Danish registry of protected buildings and places in 1926.

== History ==
=== Early history ===
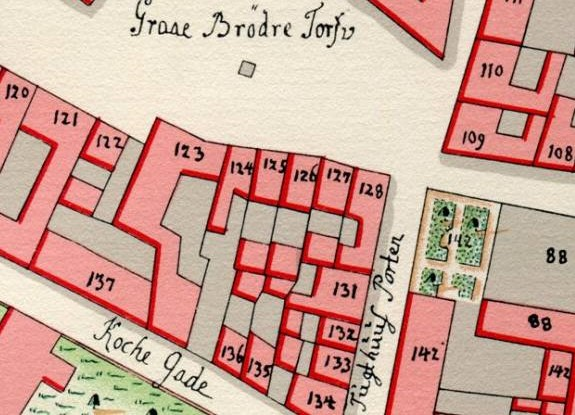
No. 125 seen on a detail from Christian Gedde's map of Frimand's Quarter, 1757.

The property was listed as No. 135 in Frimand's Quarter in Copenhagen's first cadastre of 1689. It was at that time owned by a joiner named Augustinus. The building was together with most of the other buildings in the area destroyed in the Copenhagen Fire of 1728. The present building on the site was constructed for ironmonger Peder Wiinberg in 1730–32. The property was listed as No. 125 in the new cadastre of 1756 and was then owned by ironmonger Johan Herman Wiinberg.

=== Melchior family ===
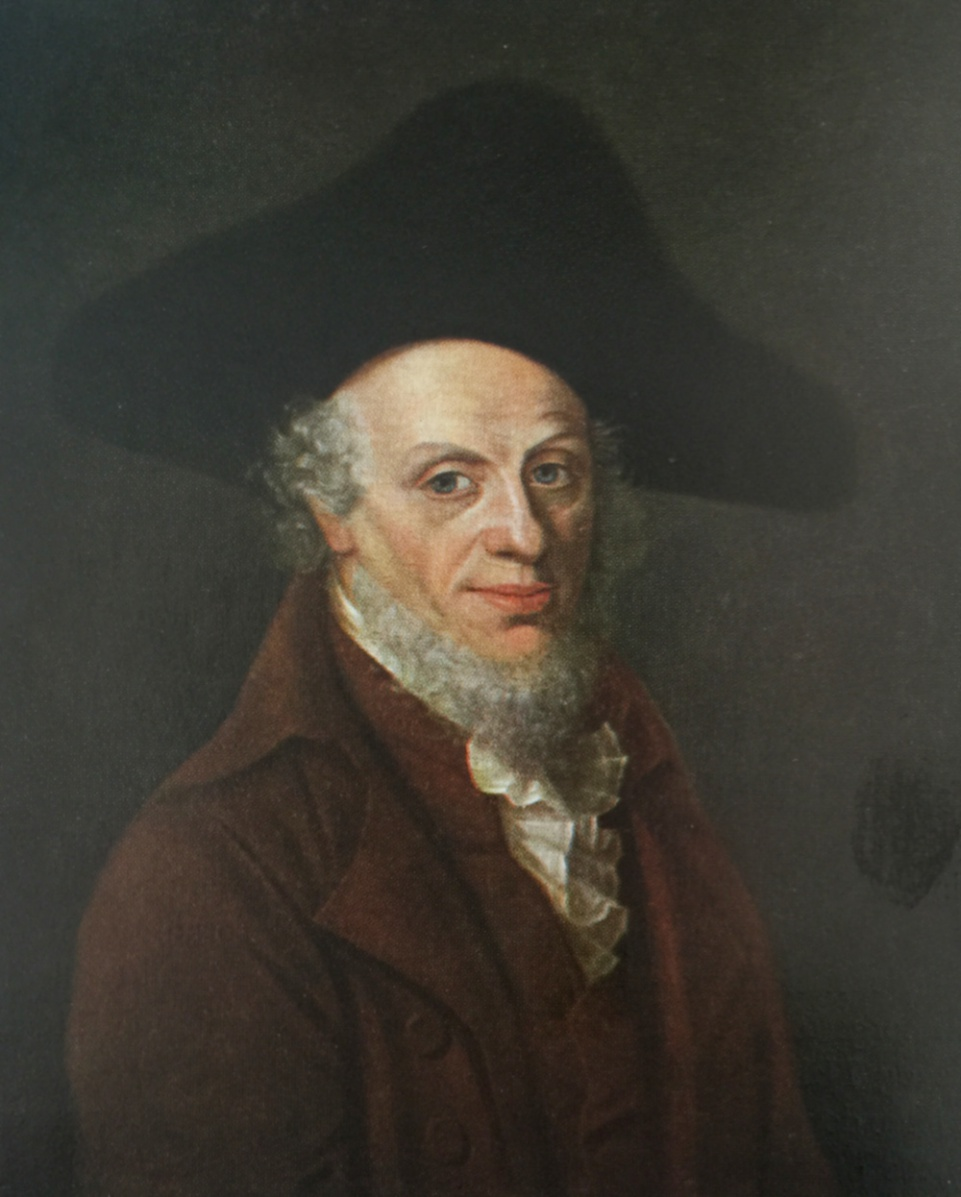
Moses Melchior

In 1783 the property was acquired by the Jewish merchants Moses Melchior and Akiba (Echiba) Jacobsen (1727-1793). They had at the same time established their own trading firm under the name Moses Melchior & Echiba Jacobsen.

At the time of the 1787 census, Akiba Jacobsen resided in the building with his sons Gerson (1771-1829) and Jacob (1775-1813). His wife Hanne Rosbach had died in 1775. Moses Melchior resided in the building with his wife Zipora, 11 of their 14 children and two maids. The children were Nathan, Henriette (Hinde), Celle Melchior, Gerson, Särche, Süssche, Jachet, Salomon, Lazarus, Jeruchim and Lea. The property was at the time of the 1787 census home to two more households. Lottery collector Joseph Philip Cohen (1737-1829) and his wife Gnendel Simon (1729-1810) resided in the building with the children Samson (1765-) and Sara Levy (1768-). The last household consisted of the textile worker Johan Sebastian Schell? (1762-), his wife Ane Margrethe Jensen (1761-) and their one-year-old son Christian.

Melchior and Jacobsen moved part of their growing trading firm to larger premises at Amagertorv No 54 (now Amagertorv 15) in the 1790s. The building on Amagertorv was from 1773 to 1799 owned by sea captain Diderich Bagge (1728-1798). Moses Melchior obtained full ownership of the trading firm as well as of the house on Gråbrødretorv by buying out Jacobsen's heirs following their father's death in 1793.

Melchior's property was listed in the new cadastre of 1806 as No. 108. The property on Gråbrødretorv was in 1813 ceded to Melchior's eldest son som Gerson Melchior. He had a few years earlier bought the property at Gammel Amagertorv/Læderstræde No. 45 (now Læderstræde 12 Amagertorv 11). On his father's death in 1817, he ceded the property on Gråbrødretorv to his brothers Lazarus (1783-1859), Marcus (1761-1843) and Nathan (1763-1732), and took on the management of Moses & Søn G. Melchior.

The building was home to a total of 31 people at the 1840 census. The 78-year-old Marcus Moses Melchior resided with give unmarried children, a maid and a lodger. The son Julius Melchior was a master shoemaker. Nathan's widow Bella Melchior bée Jacobstedt (1777-1845) resided on the first floor with her sons Marcus and Johan and a maid. The third floor was occupied by tailor Frederik Olsen Holm and his wife Johanne Lassen with their three children (aged 2 to 5), a labourer (Stephan Olsen Holm), a building painter (Wilhelm Wölchen), a master shoemaker (Hans Schmidt) and another shoemaker (Wilhelm Schmidt). CHGJ.Brochmeyer, a restaurateur, resided with his wife Ane Margrethe née Holm and four children in the ground floor apartment. Anders Petersen Mankdrup, a timber merchant, resided with his wife Sidse Larsdatter, one-year-old daughter and a lodger in the basement.

=== Later history ===
With the introduction of house numbering by street in 1859 (as opposed to the old cadastral numbers by quarter), No. 108 in Frimand's Quarter became known as Gråbrødretorv 8. The property was at the time of the 1860 census home to a total of 16 people. The second floor was occupied by two households. One of them consisted of the master bookbinder Carl Wendt Nielsen and his sister Hansine Nicoline Nielsen. The other consisted of the actress Helene Hoff and her lodger Christine Wilhelmine Christensen. Johan Dunweber. a master weaver, resided on the first floor with his wife Christiane Dunweber and his niece Botilde Jacobine Rosengaard. Ludvig Ferdinand Benthien, an innkeeper, resided on the ground floor with his wife Henrige Emilie Benthien, their two daughters (aged 2 and 4) and a maid. Christen Wandze, a grocer (høker), resided in the basement with his wife and two lodgers.

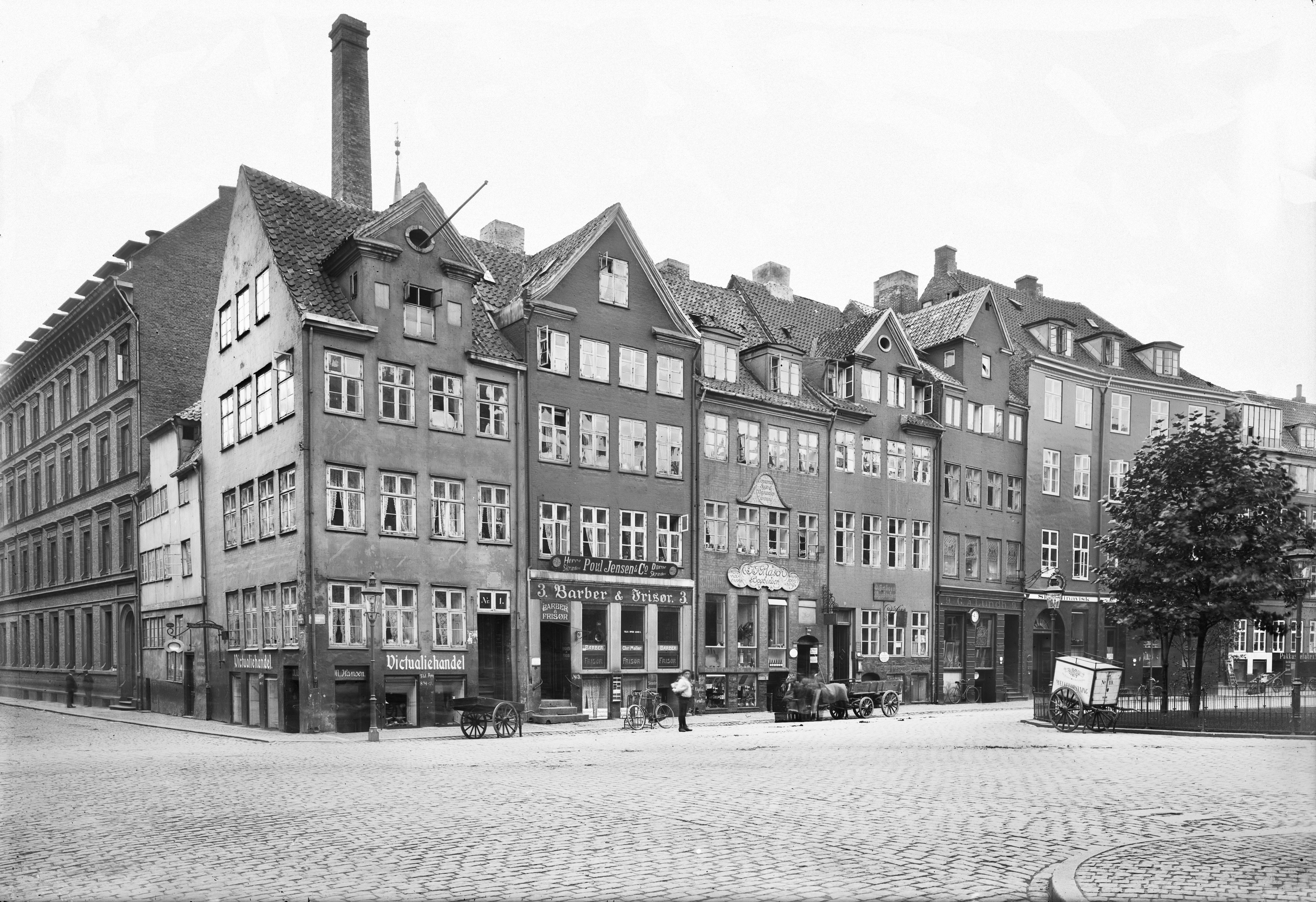
Gråbrødretorv 1–11 in 1011

Lars Carlsson Evander, a shoemaker, was later based in the ground floor, and the workshop was later taken over by his brother, Ola Carlsson Palmkvist (later spelled Palmquist, and now spelled Palmqvist). Knud Larsen's music antiquarian and publisher opened in the building in 1906. In 1953, it was taken over by Dan Fog and continued under his own name. It closed in 2012.

The property was home to a total of 14 people at the 1906 census. Ole Carlsson Palmquist, a master shoemaker, resided in the basement with his wife Ida Kristina Palmquist and their five children (aged gove to 11). Marius Andreas Holm, a 64-year-old master joiner, resided on the second floor with the 42-year-old Emma Fabritius De Tenguagd. Villum Eriksen, a master bookbinder, resided on the third floor with his wife Kirstine Eriksen and their three children. The two sons, Viggo and Otto, were both bookbinders. The daughter Olga Eriksen was a painter.

== Architecture ==
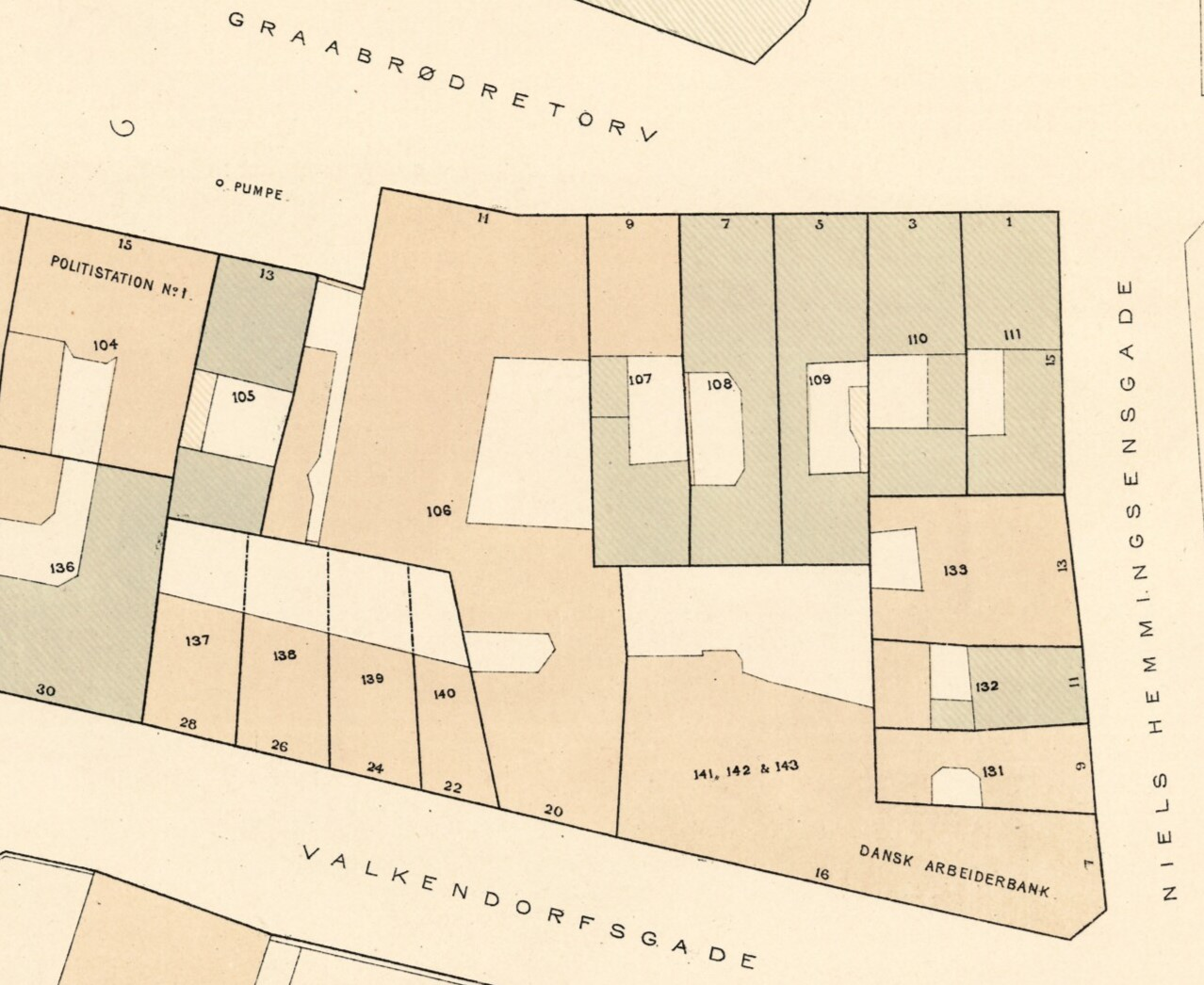
Gråbrødretorv 7 seen on a detail from one of Berggreen's block plans of Frimand's Quarter, 1886-1888.

Gråbrødretorv 7 is a three-winged complex, surrounding three sides of a narrow courtyard, constructed with three storeys over a walk-out basement. It was originally constructed in brick towards the street and timber framing on the rear but the facades towards the courtyard were rebuilt in brick in around 1800. The timber framing has therefore only survived on the rear wall of the rear wing and part of the gables. The front side of the building is just four bays wide, plastered and red-painted, with green-painted door and window frames in the ground floor and white-painted window frames on the upper floors. The main entrance is topped by a transom window with the house number (7). The facade is crowned by a two-bay gabled wall dormer with cornice returns and an oculus in the gable. The red tile roof is pierced by a substantial but shortened chimney. The facades facing the courtyard are all rendered with ochre-coloured plaster. They meet in two diagonal dormer bays.

== Today ==
The building is today owned by Danish MIT professor Tobias Holck Colding. Salon Gråbrødretorv 7 is based on the ground floor. The fashion brand Ecouture is based on the first floor. The rest of the building contains a combination of residential apartments and office space.
