= Læderstræde 5 =

Listed building in Copenhagen

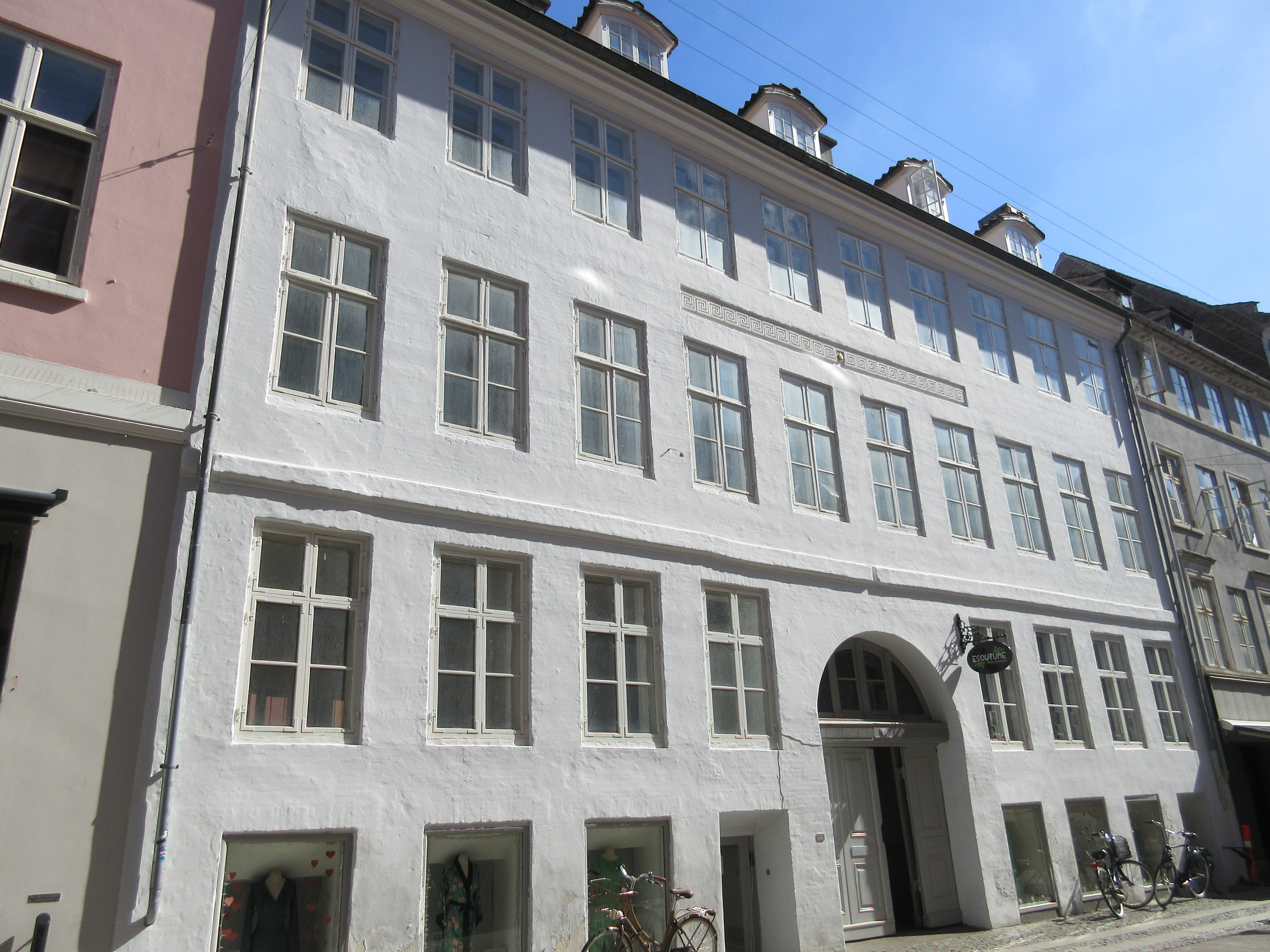
- Interactive map of the Læderstræde 5 area

General information
- Location: Copenhagen, Denmark
- Coordinates: 55°40′41.74″N 12°34′43.32″E
- Completed: 1898

Læderstræde 5 is a Neoclassical property situated on Strædet, close to Højbro Plads, in the Old Town of Copenhagen, Denmark. A private synagogue was from 1800 to 1836 and again from 1845 to 1986 based on the first floor of the building. The second synagogue was opened by Moses Levy and was for many years the only alternative to the Great Synagogue in Krystalgade. In his will, Levy converted the building into a foundation under the name Moses Levys Stiftelse og Synagoge. The building was listed in the Danish registry of protected buildings and places in 1945.

== Architecture ==
Læderstræde 5 is constructed with three storeys over a walk-out basement. The building is ten bays long with slightly projecting outer bays. The plastered facade is finished with a belt course above the ground floor, an embedded Greek key frieze between the four central windows of the two upper floors and a simple cornice. A gateway is located in the two central bays and the two basement entrances are located in the fourth and 10th bay. An opening in the eastern wall of the gateway provides access to the main staircase of the building. The pitched roof is clad with red tile and features five dormer windows towards the street and five dormer windows towards the yard. The roof ridge is pierced by two chimneys. The building is towards the yard rendered iron vitriol yellow. A two-bay-long two-storey appendix projects from the rear side of the building at its western end. It was constructed in 1870.

== See also ==
- Henriette Melchiors Stiftelse
- History of the Jews in Denmark
