= Moses Melchior (businessman) =

Danish merchant and judge (1825–1912)

- Melchior painted by Bertha Wegmann
- Born: 28 January 1825; Copenhagen, Denmark
- Died: 25 November 1912 (aged 87); Copenhagen, Denmark
- Occupations: Merchant and ship-owner

Moses Melchior (28 January 1825 – 25 November 1912) was a Jewish Danish businessman. He was a co-owner of Moses & Søn G. Melchior, a trading house founded by his grandfather.

== Early life and education ==
Melchior was born into a wealthy Jewish family in Copenhagen, the son of Gerson Moses Melchior (1771–1845) by his second wife Birgitte (Jette) Melchior née Israel (1792–1855). His father was second generation in the trading house Moses & Søn G. Melchior. He received a commercial education in Jacob Holm & Sønner.

== Career ==
Moses Melchior's elder brother Moritz G. Melchior became the sole owner of Moses & Søn G. Melchior when their father died in 1845. Moses Melchior joined him as a partner in 1850. After Moritz G. Melchior's death in 1884, Moses Melchior took over the management of the company in collaboration with his nephew Carl Henriques Melchior.

Melchior was a board member of Det Store Nordiske Telegrafselskab, chairman of Fjerde Søforsikringsselskab, and a board member of Plantageselskabet Dansk Vestindien.

== Public life and charity ==
Melchior was a member of the Copenhagen City Council (Borgerrepræsentationen) from 1869 to 1984. He was a member of the Maritime and Commercial Court (Sø- og Handelsretten) from 1883 to 1905 and of Grosserer-Societetet's committee from 1885 to 1904.

He was cashier for Foreningen til Søfartens Fremme and vice president of Komitéen for Dansk Vestindien, and chairman of Administrationen.

He was also active in a number of Jewish associations and organisations. He was thus active in Præmieselskabet for den mosaiske Ungdom and chairman of Sygeplejeselskabet for Mosaisk Trossamfund, member of the central committee.

He was also active in a number of charities. He was a board member of Fængselshjælpen, chairman of Arbejdernes Byggeforening from 1870 until his death (a member from 1867), He served as cashier for Hjem for arbejdsføre blinde Kvinder and sat on the governing board of Københavns Understøttelsesforening. He founded Henriette Melchiors Stiftelse with affordable accommodation for widows of artists and scientists, naming it after his sister Henriette Melchior (–1902).

== Personal life and legacy ==
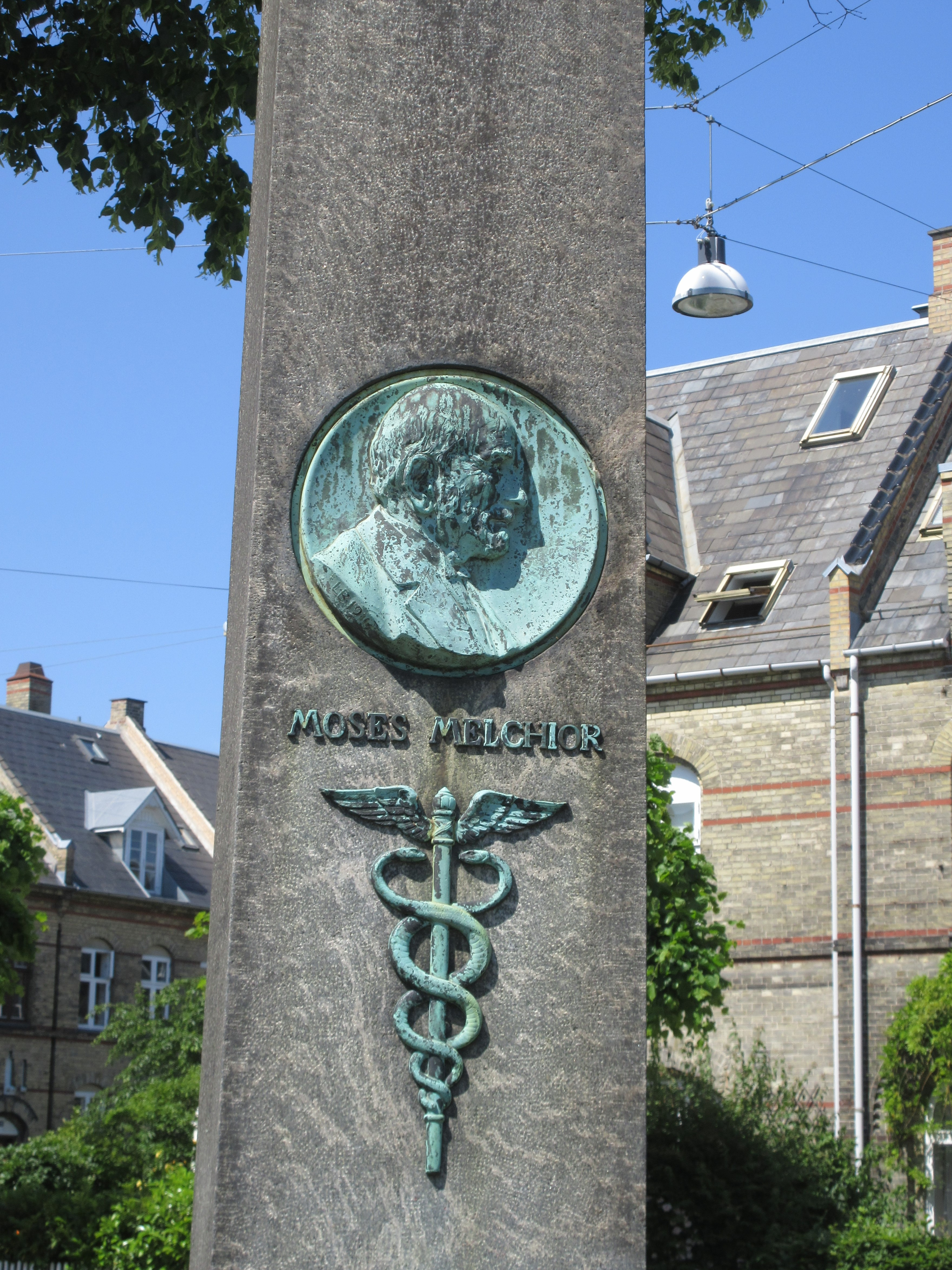
The memorial to Ulrik and Moses at Kildevældsgade

Moses Melchior remained unmarried and had no children. As part of the Melchior family, Moses Melchior was a close friend of the writer Hans Christian Andersen. He participated in the celebration of his 65 years birthday. Melchior died on 25 November 1912 and is buried in the Jewish Northern Cemetery in Copenhagen.

An obelisk in the centre of the Kildevæld Quarter commemorates his role in the establishment of Arbejdernes Byggeforening. The memorial is from 1916 and was created by Ludvig Brandstrup.

He is seen in Laurits Tuxen's oil painting Middag hos Moresco (1906).
