= Naboløs 4 =

Complex of neoclassical buildings in Copenhagen, Denmark

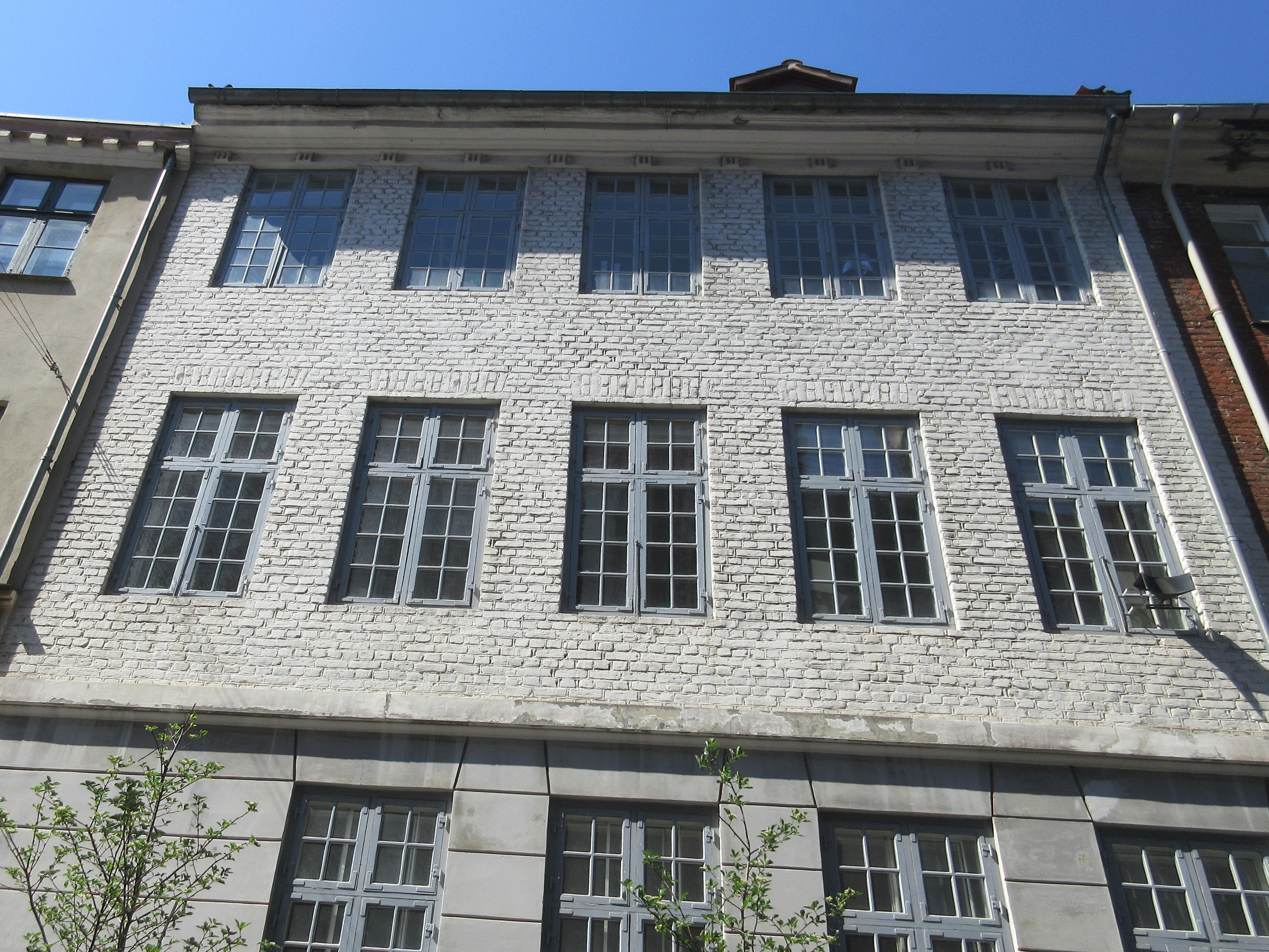
- Interactive map of the Naboløs 4 area

General information
- Architectural style: Neoclassical
- Location: Copenhagen, Denmark
- Coordinates: 55°40′38.93″N 12°34′37.2″E
- Completed: 1802

Naboløs 4 (Snaregade 4) is a complex of Neoclassical buildings situated on an L-shaped plot, with one building fronting the street Naboløs and another one fronting the street Snaregade, in the Old Town of Copenhagen, Denmark. The two buildings are at the corner of the two streets separated from each other by Henriette Melchiors Stiftelse. The buildings was like most of the other buildings in the area constructed as part of the rebuilding of the city after the Copenhagen Fire of 1795. They were jointly listed in the Danish registry of protected buildings and places in 1945.

== History ==
=== Early history ===
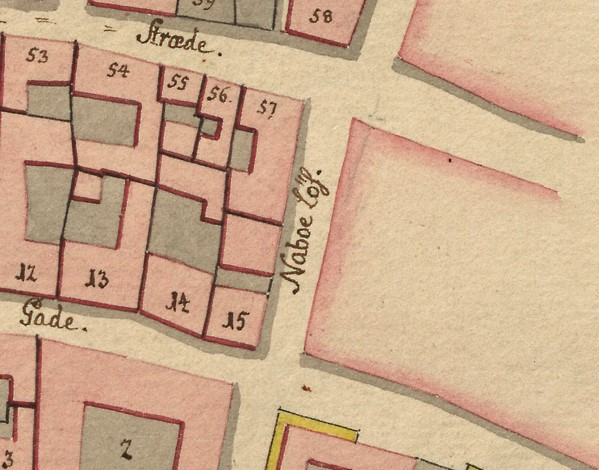
No. 14 seen on a detail from Christian Gedde's map of Snaren's Quarter, 1756.

The site was in 1689 made up of two individual properties. The property in Snaregade was as No. 16 in Snaren's Quarter owned by Hans Helverskov's widow. The property in Naboløs was as No. 18 in Snaren's Quarter owned by merchant Niels Jensen. The property in Naboløs was probably the reason for the strange street name (lit. "Without Neighbors"), being the only property with address in the street. Its two neighboring properties fronted Snaregade and Kompagnistræde, respectively, while the other side of the street was made up of one big property with address in Læderstræde.

The two properties had by 1756 as No. 14 in Snaren's Quarter been merged into a single property owned by brewer Peder Gode.

The property was at the time of the 1787 census home to four sugar house workers, eight apprentices and one maid, indicating that a sugar house may also have been situated on the site.

=== Jacob Laurids Thrane ===
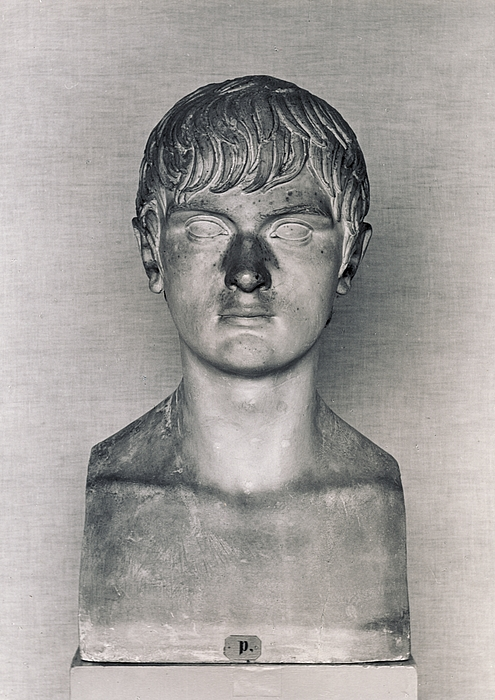
Thorvaldsen's bust of J. L. Thrane.

The buildings were together with most of the other buildings in the area destroyed in the Copenhagen Fire of 1795. The fire site was later acquired by the young master mason and architecture student Jacob Laurids Thrane (1785-1819). The building in Naboløs was completed by him in 1802. The building in Snaregade was constructed some time between 1802 and 1811. The property was in the new cadastre of 1806 listed as No. 13 in Snaren's Quarter. It was in 1811 divided into No. 13 A in Snaregade and No. 13 B in Naboløs.

Thrane came from a wealthy family. In 1804–07, he and the architect Andreas Dobert Kalleberg went on a journey to Germany, Italy and Greece. Bertel Thorvaldsen, whom he met in Rome in 1807, created a bust of him (plaster 1806, marble 1807). Thrane went bankrupt after purchasing Appelsbjerggaard at Slagelse in 1818. He then abandoned his Italian wife and son and went to the Danish West Indies where he died on Saint Croix the following year.

=== Snaregade 13 A & B, 1811–1869 ===
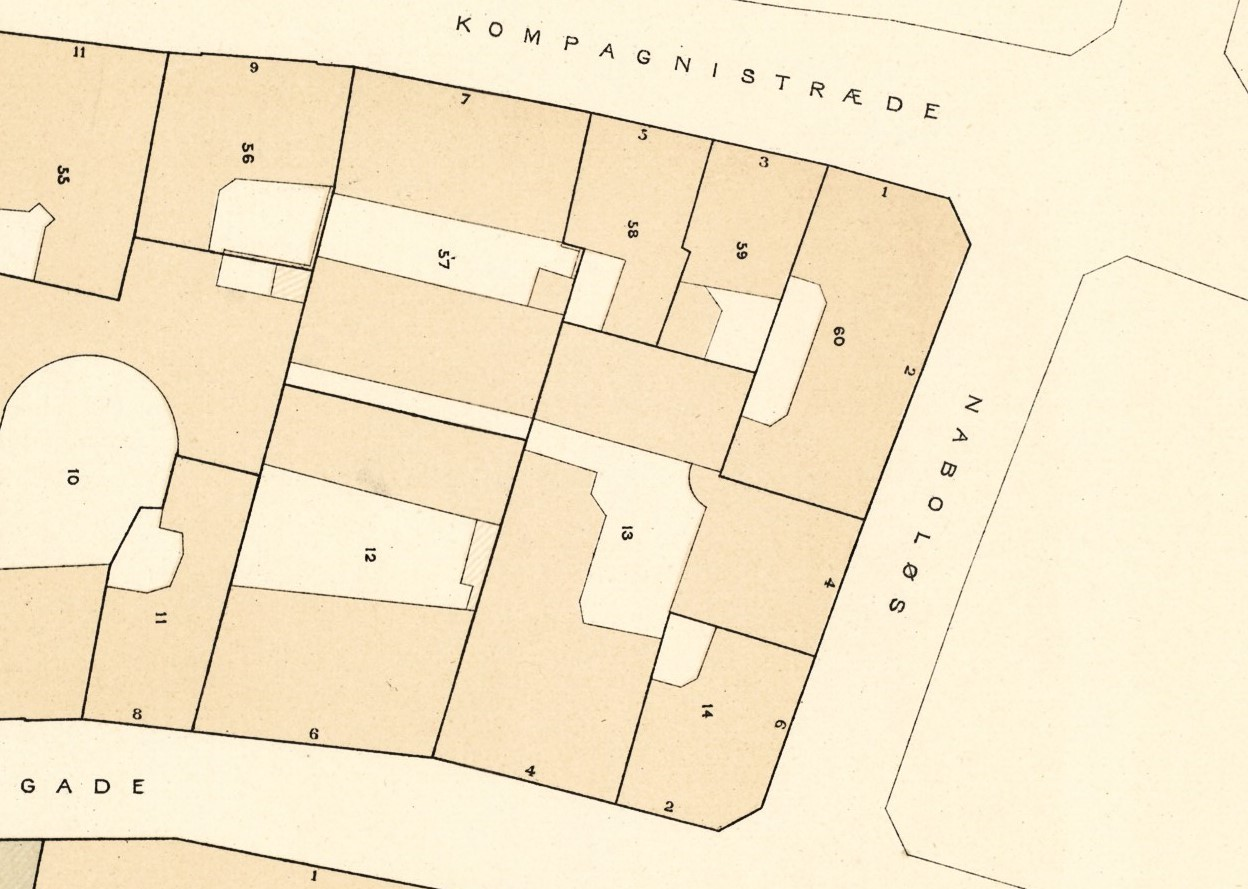
The property seen on a detail from Berggreen's cadastral map of Snaren's Quarter, 1884.

Carl Christian Rafn was among the residents in the building on Snaregade from 1821 to 1823. No. 13A was at the time of the 1840 census home to a total of 25 people. The painter Wilhelm Marstrand resided in the building from 1849 to 1854. The landscape painter Frederik Kraft was also among the residents in 1854.

The master shoemaker Gottlieb Siesbye (1803-1884) was a resident in the building on Naboløs in 1831. He would later become involved in the liberal movement in the late 1830s. and started writing for Københavns Morgenblad and Dansk Folkeblad. He gave up shoemaking altogether when he was offered a full-time position as journalist for Flyveposten. The lawyer and politician Harald Raasløff resided in the same building in 1838–39. No. 13B was at the time of the 1840 census home to a total of 44 people.

=== Naboløs 4/Snaregade 4, 1859–present ===
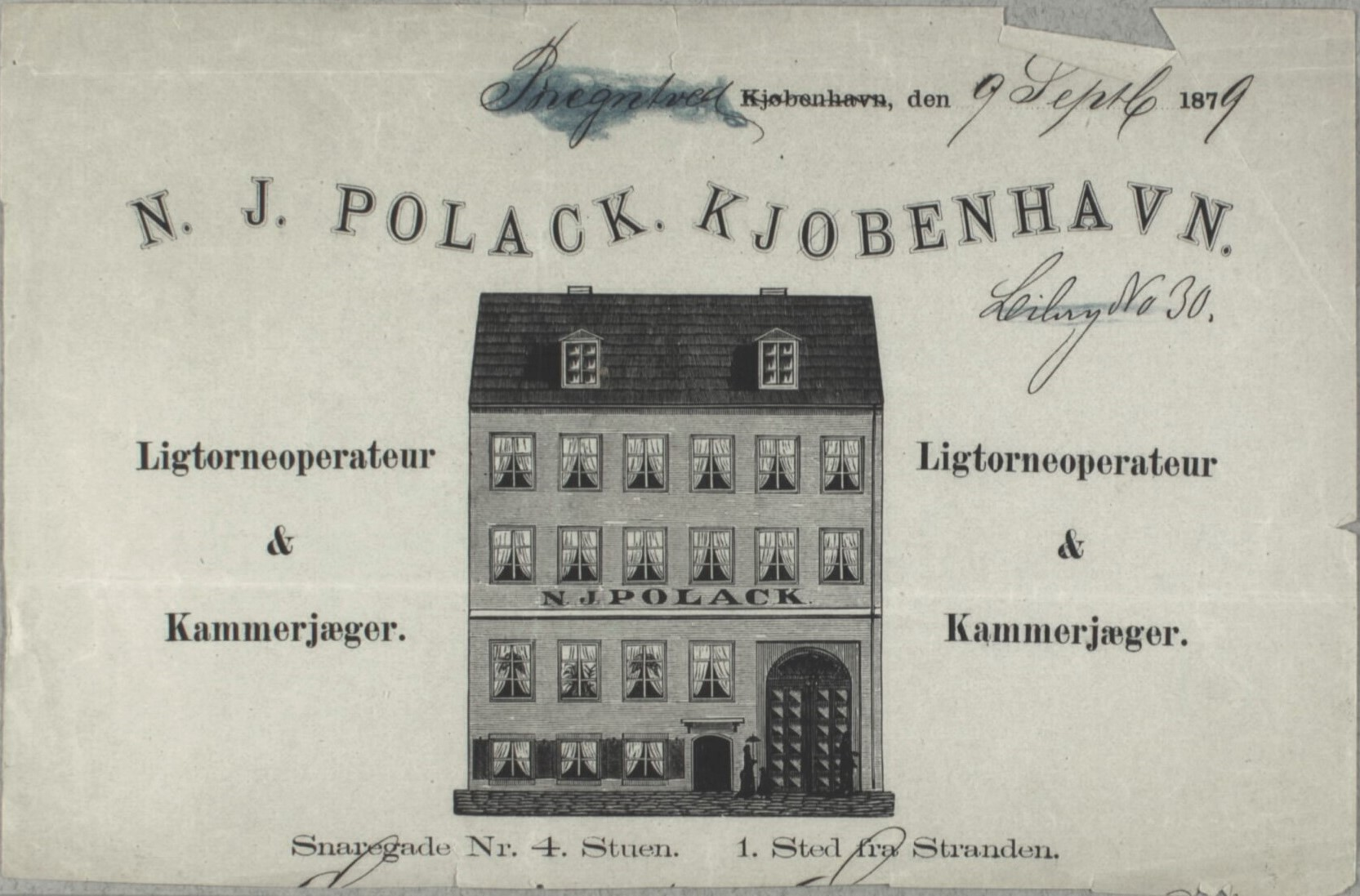
Advert for N. J. Polack, 1879.

The two buildings became known as Naboløs 4 and Snaregade 4 when house numbering by street was introduced in 1859 as a supplement to the old cadastral numbers by quarter. The property was at the time of the 1860 census home to a total of 44 people. The residents included the organ builder Frederik Hoffmann Ramus. Other residents included a master shoemaker and a master building painter,

The painter Frederik Christian Lund was among the residents in 1865–66. The painter Gotfred Rump resided in the building from 1871 until his deathnine years later. N. J. Polack, "Corn Operator & Chamber Hunter (aka Pst controller)", was in the 1870s based in the ground floor at Snaregade 1.

At the time of the 1880 census, Naboløs 4 was home to a total of 62 residents.

== Architecture ==
=== Naboløs 4 ===
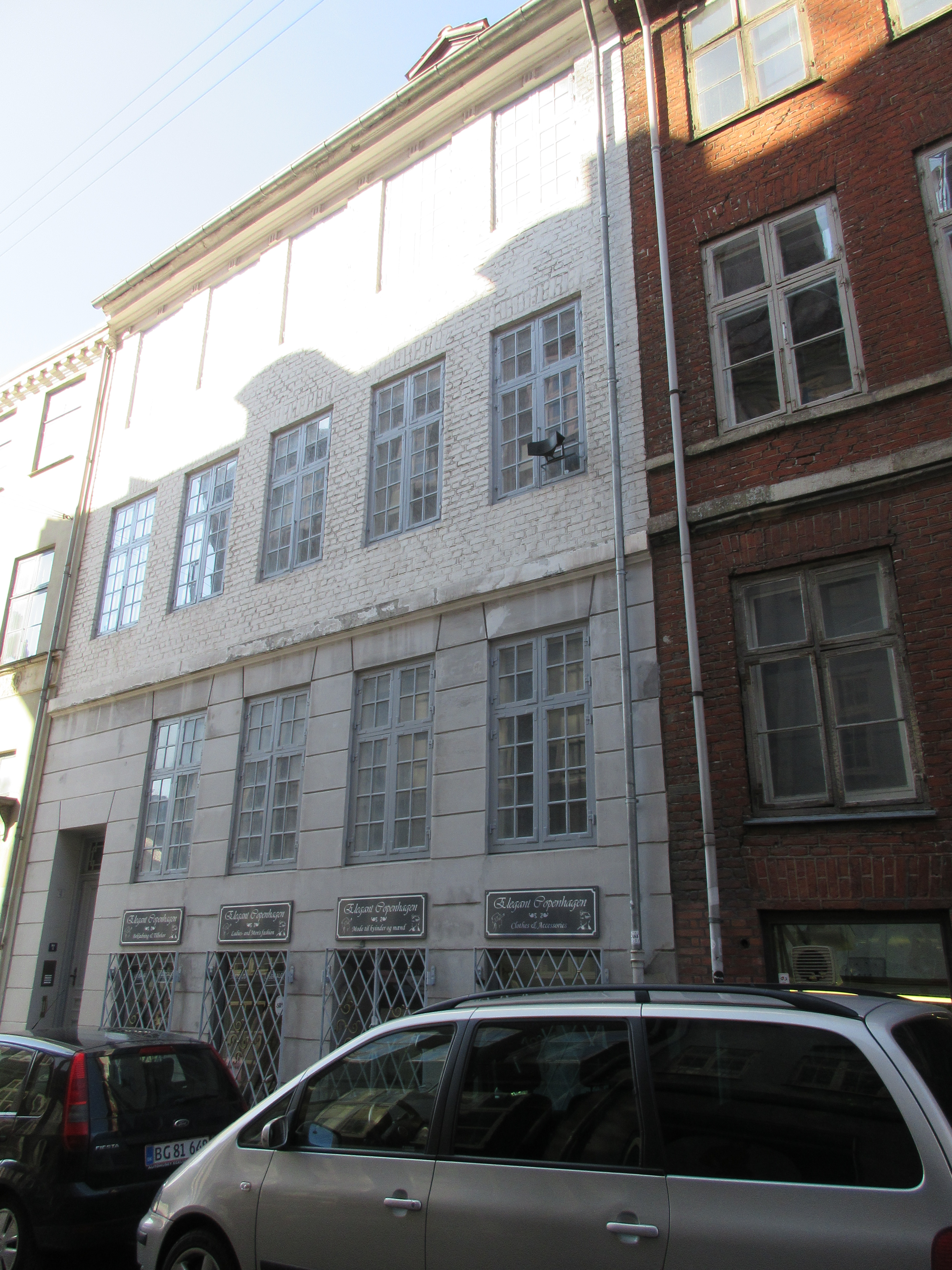
Naboløs 4

Naboløs 4 is constructed in brick with three storeys over a walk-out basement. The façade is five bays wide and finished by a belt course above the ground floor. and a decorated cornice. The plastered ground floor is finished with shadow joints and painted grey while the upper part is painted in a pale grey colour directly on the undressed brick. The main entrance, a grey-painted door with transom window, is raised three steps from the street level. The door and anteroom replaced a gateway in 1883. The patched roof is clad in red tile and features two dormer window on each side. The roof ridge is pierced by a chimney.

The building is on its rear attached to a fgive-bays-long, four-storey perpendicular side wing. The façade of the side wing is crowned by a wall dormer with cornice returns and pulley beam. The original pitched roof was some time between 1745 and 1877 replaced by the current monopitched, red tile roof. The two wings are integrated via a two-bay outwardly curved, diagonal section. The façade is towards the courtyard plastered and painted yellow.

=== Snaregade 4 ===
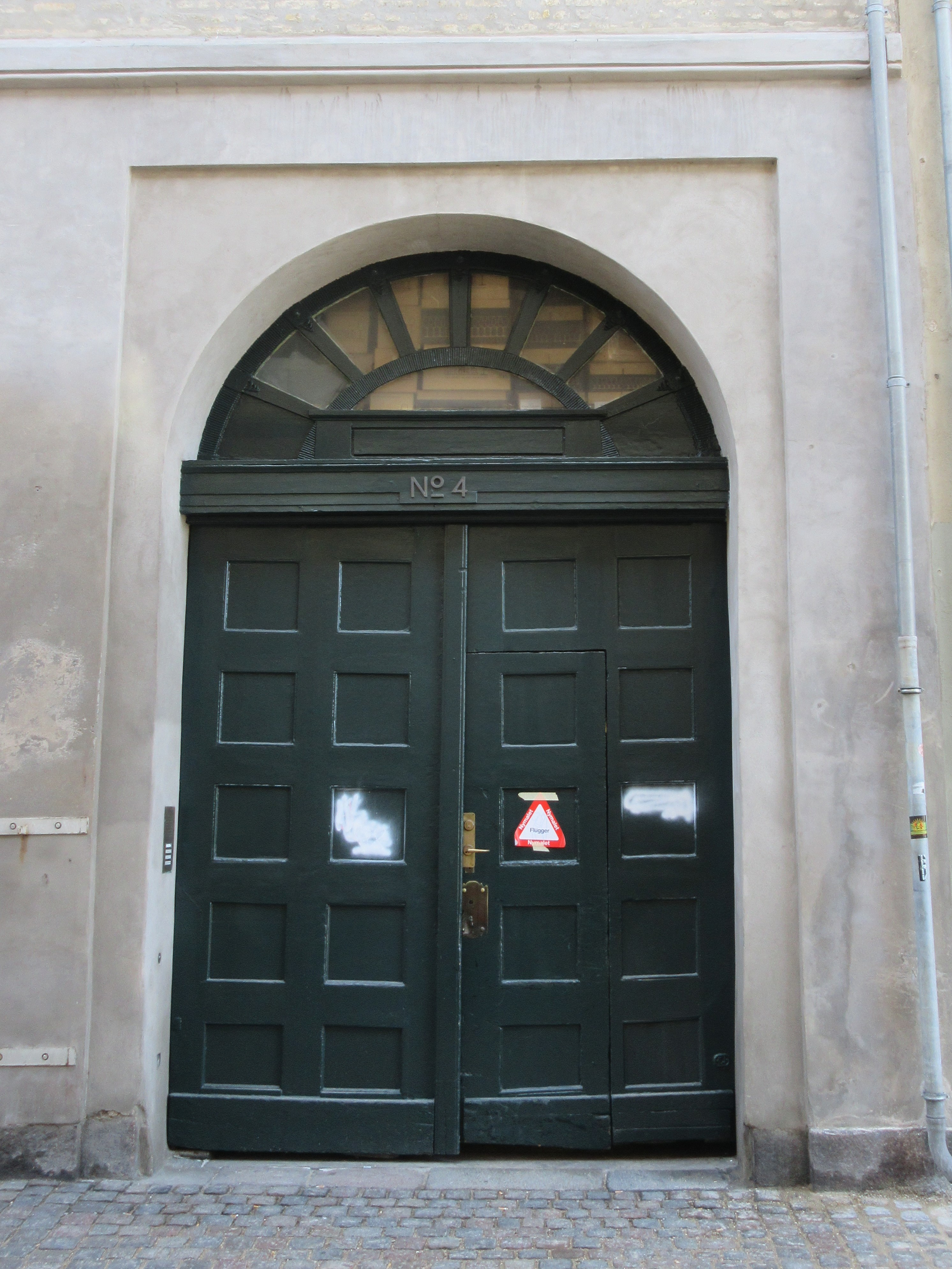
The gate of Snaregade 4.

Snaregade 4 is constructed with three storeys over a walk-out basement. The six-bay façade is finished by a narrow belt course above the ground floor and a modillioned Cornice. The ground floor is plastered and painted grew while the upper part of the façade is felted and painted grey. The gate furthest to the right provides access to the courtyard. The roof is clad in black tile. A perpendicular side wing extends from the rear side. The façade towards the courtyard is again painted yellow. The short gab between the gables of the two perpendicular wings is closed by a wall.

== Today ==
The complex has been converted into condominiums and is jointly owned by the owners via EF Snaregade 4/Naboløs 4. The restaurant Marv & Ben is based in the basement at Snaregade 4.
