= Henriette Melchiors Stiftelse =

Historic building in Copenhagen, Denmark

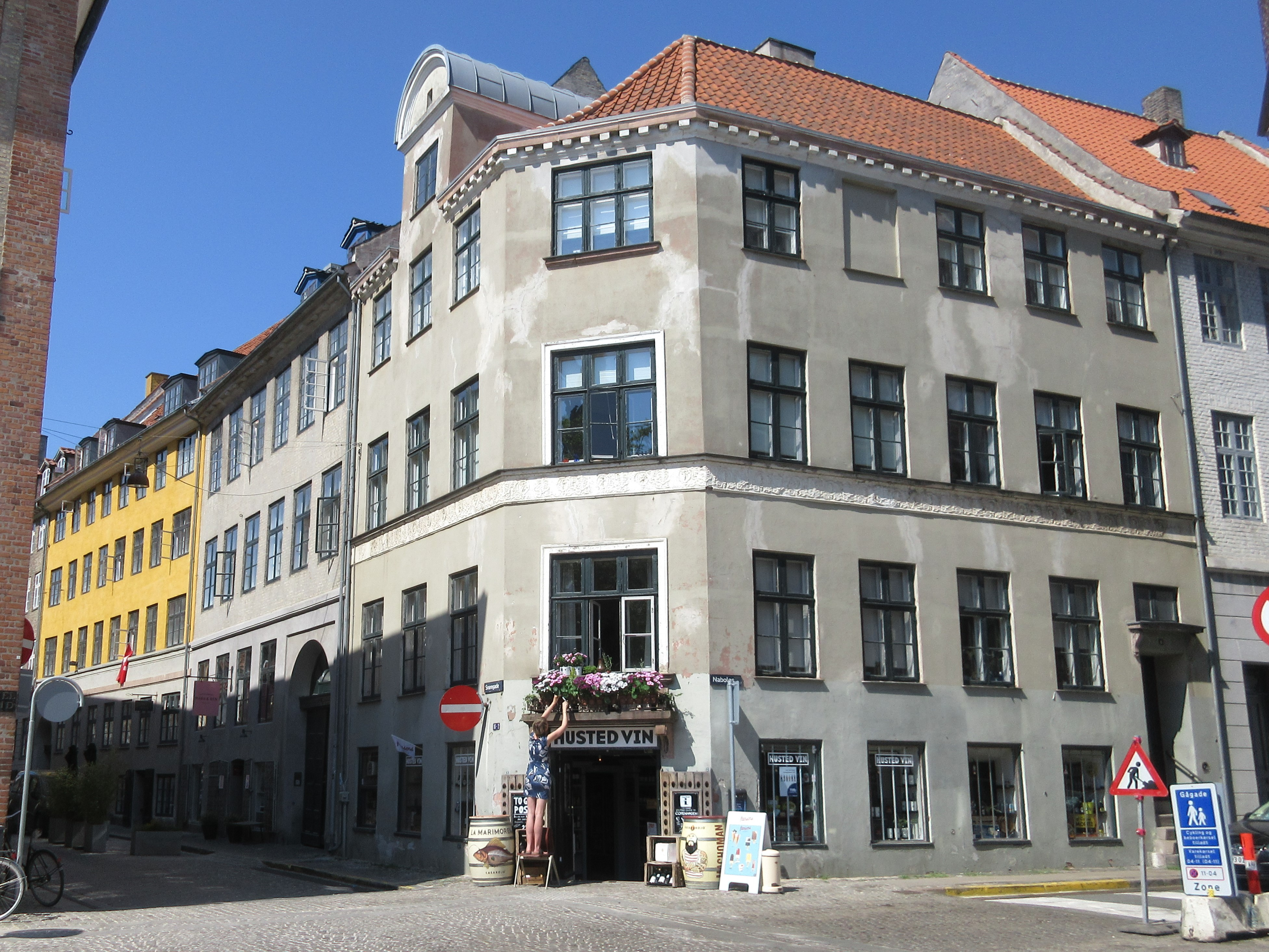
- Interactive map of the Henriette Melchiors Stiftelse area

General information
- Architectural style: Neoclassical
- Location: Copenhagen, Denmark
- Coordinates: 55°40′38.57″N 12°34′37.49″E
- Completed: 1797
- Inaugurated: 1849

Henriette Melchiors Stiftelse is a historic building situated at the corner of Snaregade and Naboløs, overlooking the Gammel Strand canalfront, in central Copenhagen, Denmark. The building was constructed for the Jewish businessman Lion Israel after the previous building on the site had been destroyed in the Copenhagen Fire of 1795. It was, from 1861, owned by his grandson Moses Melchior, who in his will converted it into a charity with affordable accommodation for widows of scientists and artists, named for his sister Henriette Melchior. The building was listed in the Danish registry of protected buildings and places in 1918.

== History ==
=== Early history ===
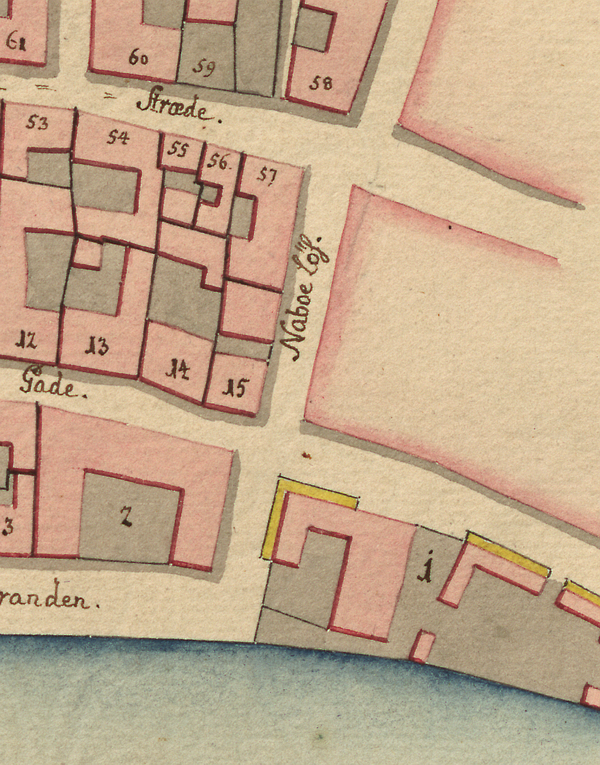
No. 15 seen on a detail from Christian Gedde's map of Snaren's Quarter, 1756.

The property was in 1689 as No. 17 in Strand Quarter owned by Gert Mejer Jr. It was later owned by wine merchant (vintapper) Andreas Klarup. On 20 December 1756, it was as No. 15 acquired by tailor Friedrich Uhl. On 18 January 1762, he sold it to merchant (urtekræmmer) Jens Krøjer. On 7 July 1765, it changed hands again when it was acquired by wigmaker Johannes Baltzer. The property was then the site of a half-timbered building fronting Snaregade, but pulled back from the street, as well as a gatehouse situated to the left of the main building. Christoffer Valkendorff's ejerbod from 1581 blocked the view of the canal.

The property was, on 17 June 1776, acquired by porcelain merchant Cay Friderich Hammerich (1749–1816). Hammerich was at the time of the 1787 census residing in the building with his wife Cay Friderich Hammerich (1749–1816), their five children (aged 2–10), the nephew Johann Leonhart Stuhr (1774-) and a staff of four servants. The property was at this point also home to three more households. Christian Gottlieb Sneider (1743-), a secretary in the Politikammeret (Police Authority), resided in another apartment with his wife Bolette née Gram (1737-), their son Christian Friederich (1772–1825), the wife's niece Anne Hansdatter (1758-) and a maid. The two last households were each made up of a single person: the widow Anne Listnik? (1723-) and the widower Per Thommesen (1713-).

In 1795, upon selling his old property, Hammerich purchased another property at Vigantsgade No. 210 (now Ny Vestergade 8, now replaced by an extension of the National Museum).). His eldest son Johannes Hammerich would a few years later buy the property at what is now Nybrogade 10.

=== Lion Israel, 1793–1834 ===
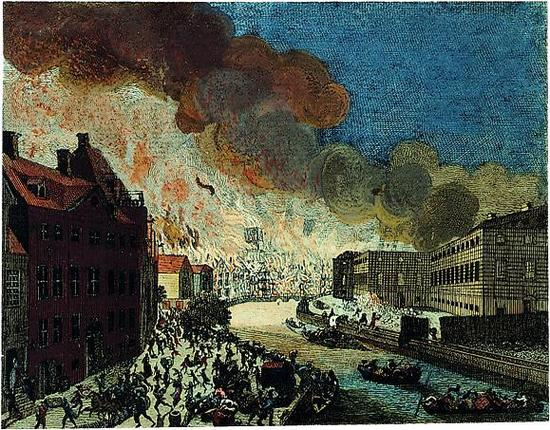
The Fire of 1795 seen from Nybrogade.

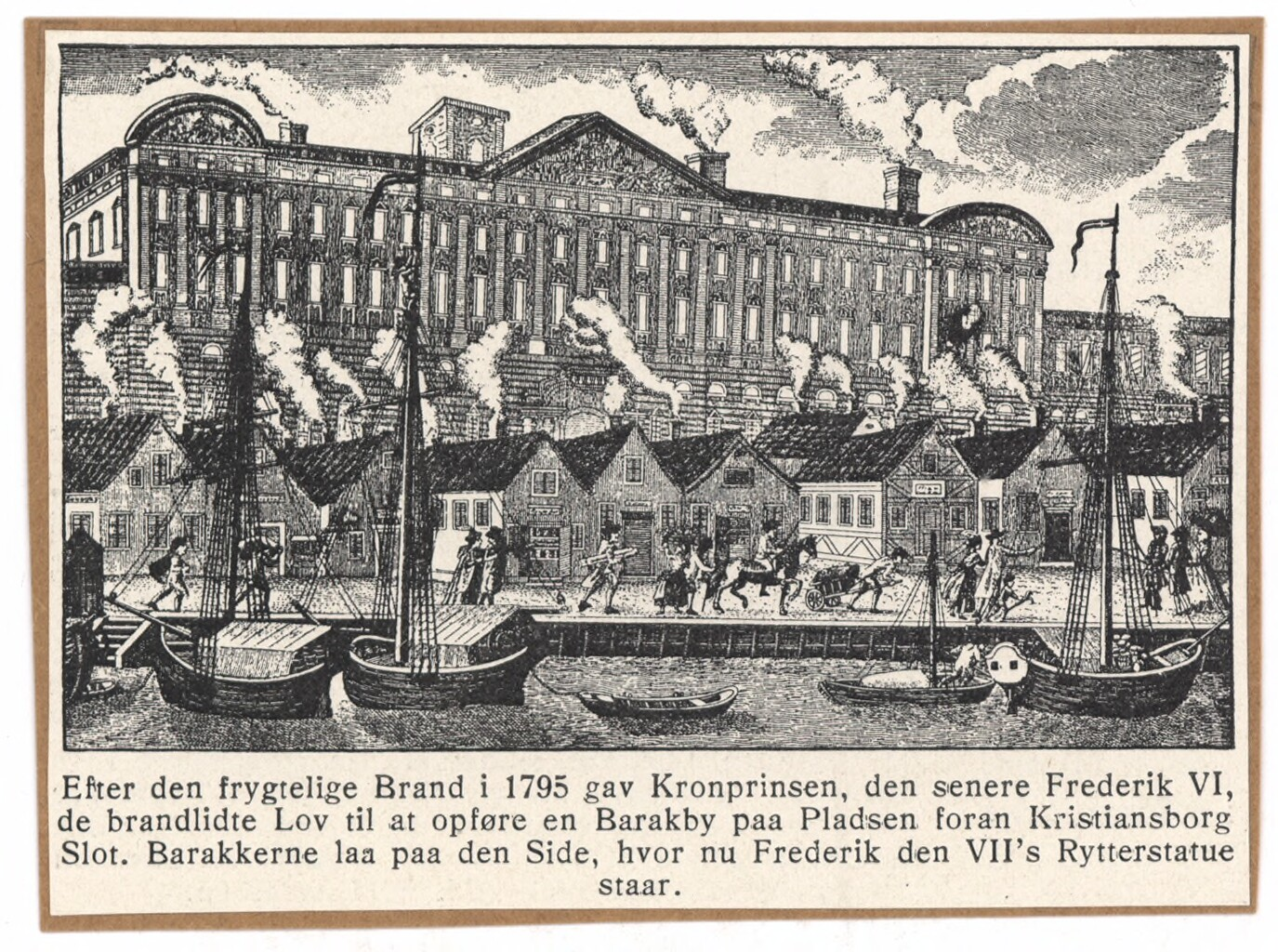
The wooden sheds in front of the destroyed Christiansborg Palace where the family sought refuge until their new home was completed in 1797.

On 14 October 1793, Hammerich sold the property to the Jewish merchant (urtekræmmer) Lion Israel (1750–1834). He had in 1790 married (Gitte) Cantor (1759-1804?), daughter of Levin Jacob Cantor (-1764) and Gitle (Jitche) Levy (1721–1792), with whom he had the daughter Birgitte Jette (1792–1855) and the son Israel Lion Israel (1793–1848). The building was destroyed in the Copenhagen Fire of 1795. The buildings on the other side of Snaregade, including the Royal Pawn, opposite Israel's house, just escaped the flames. The family had to seek refuge in a wooden shed on Slotsholmen while a new building was constructed. Construction started in 1796 and the building was completed the following year. The new building contained a tea shop in the basement at the corner. The backyard contained a half-timbered lavatory, a hen house and a water pump. The value of the completed building was assessed by Philip Lange from the Royal Fire Insurance Company at 6,800 rigsdaler.

The building was, at the time of the 1801 census, home to three households. Lion Israel and his wife lived there with their two children and a couple of other family members. Arsenal manager Jørgen Lund (1744–1823) and his wife Birgitte Sophie von Bergen (1760–1838) resided in another apartment with their four children (aged 9–19) and a maid. The last of the three households consisted of butcher Løser Lazarus Speir (1772-) and his wife Bella Rottenburg (1779-) with their two children (aged 1–3), the widow Regina Speir (1735-) and her two sisters (1769–1845), and a maid.

The property was in the new cadastre of 1806 listed as No. 14. Galathea Israel had died in 1804. Lion Israel was, on 18 December 1809, in his second marriage, married to Lea Elisabeth Hermann (1790 - c. 1870), daughter of Elias Hermann and Lea Leiner. Their marriage did not result in any children.

On 29 December 1807, Birgitte Jette was married to the wealthy merchant (grosserer) Gerson Moses Melchior (1771–1845). Melchior's father Moses Marcus Melchior (1736–1817) was the owner of the trading company Moses & Søn G. Melchior. Gerson Melchior was already the father of four children from his first marriage and they also had four children together. In 1810, Melchior bought a property on Amagertorv (No. 45. now Amagertorv 11)) where they lived from then on.

=== Israel Lion Israel, 1836–1848 ===
Lion Israel willed his house at the corner of Naboløs and Snaregade to his son Israel Lion Israel with a share of 5/6 and his son-in-law (Gerson Melchior) with a share of 1/6. Israel Lion Israel remained unmarried. The building was at the time of the 1840 census home to a total of 16 people. Israel Lion Israel and Lea Israel occupied the first floor apartment with two maids. Betty (Bolette) Gedalia Lazarus (1786–1857), widow of broker Moses Jacob Lazarus (1777–1828), resided with their daughters Sara (1815–1901) and Frederikke (1817–1875) and two maids on the second floor. Carl Ferdinand Klagenberg (1792-), his wife Frederikke (1800-), their son Carl Frantz Albert (aged 8) and a maid occupied the ground floor apartment. The unmarried merchant (urtekræmmer) Jørgen Fahnøe (1804-), handelsbetjent Jens Paul Fahnøe (1805-) and an urtekræmmer apprentice resided in the basement.

=== Birgitte Jette Melchior, 1848–1855 ===
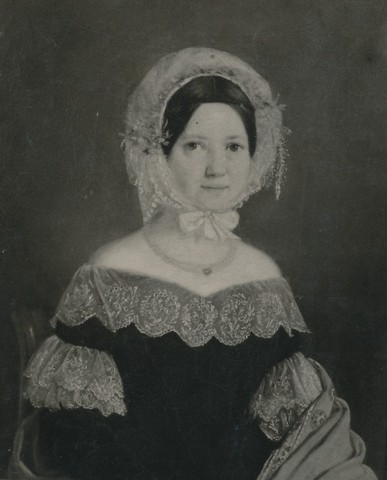
Birgitte Jette Melchior (Israel)

Israel Lion Israel was at the time of his death in 1848 the sole owner of the property. He bequeathed it to his sister, Birgitte Jette, who had become a widow in 1845. She was now heading Moses Melchior & Søm G. Melchior in collaboration with her eldest son Moritz G. Melchior. She initially stayed in the house on Amagertorv for the first few years. She was at the time of the 1850 census living there with the three unmarried children: Henriette, Marcus and Jacob.

The second floor apartment was at the time of the 1850 census empty due to an ongoing renovation of the building. Captain Frederik Regner Julius Schack (1812–1896) resided in the first floor apartment with his wife Charlotte Amalie Aagaard (1819-), their daughter Axeline Schack (1848-) and two maids. Peter Hansen (1800-), a master tailor, resided on the ground floor with his wife hans kone Anne Gjertrud Petersen (1796-), their youngest child Johannes Theodor Benjamin Hansen (1840-), and an apprentice. Jens Fanøe, a merchant (urtekræmmer), resided in the basement with his wife Anne Cathrine (1825-), two children and a maid. It is not known where Lea Israel was living by then. In 1852, Birgitte Jette Melchior moved back to her childhood home at the corner of Naboløs and Snaregade.

Lea Israel moved back to the first floor apartment following Birgitte Jette Melchior's death in 1855. She was at the time of the 1855 census living there with the housemaid (husjomfru) Amalie (Malle) Salomon (1815–1880) and two maids. Danish Chancery secretary Rasmus Blichfeldt (1792–1867) and his wife Louise Frederikke Gersdoff Arntsen (1792–1891) were now residing on the second floor with their five children (aged 13–21) and a maid. The ground floor apartment was still occupied by master tailor Peter Hansen and his family. The unmarried merchants Martin Kühne Evart Fritz (1828-) and Georg Bi... (1827-) resided with a servant in the basement. The second floor apartment had by 1860 been taken over by Adolphine Caroline Margrethe Stenersen (1827-), widow of chamberlain and royal adjudant Axel Thorstensen (1812–1854), who lived there with their son Louis Christian Thorstensen and two maids.

The Vejerbod building in front of the building was demolished in 1857. The canal front was from then on used for the Gammel Strand fish market and for flea markets.

=== Moses Melchior, 1861–1914 ===
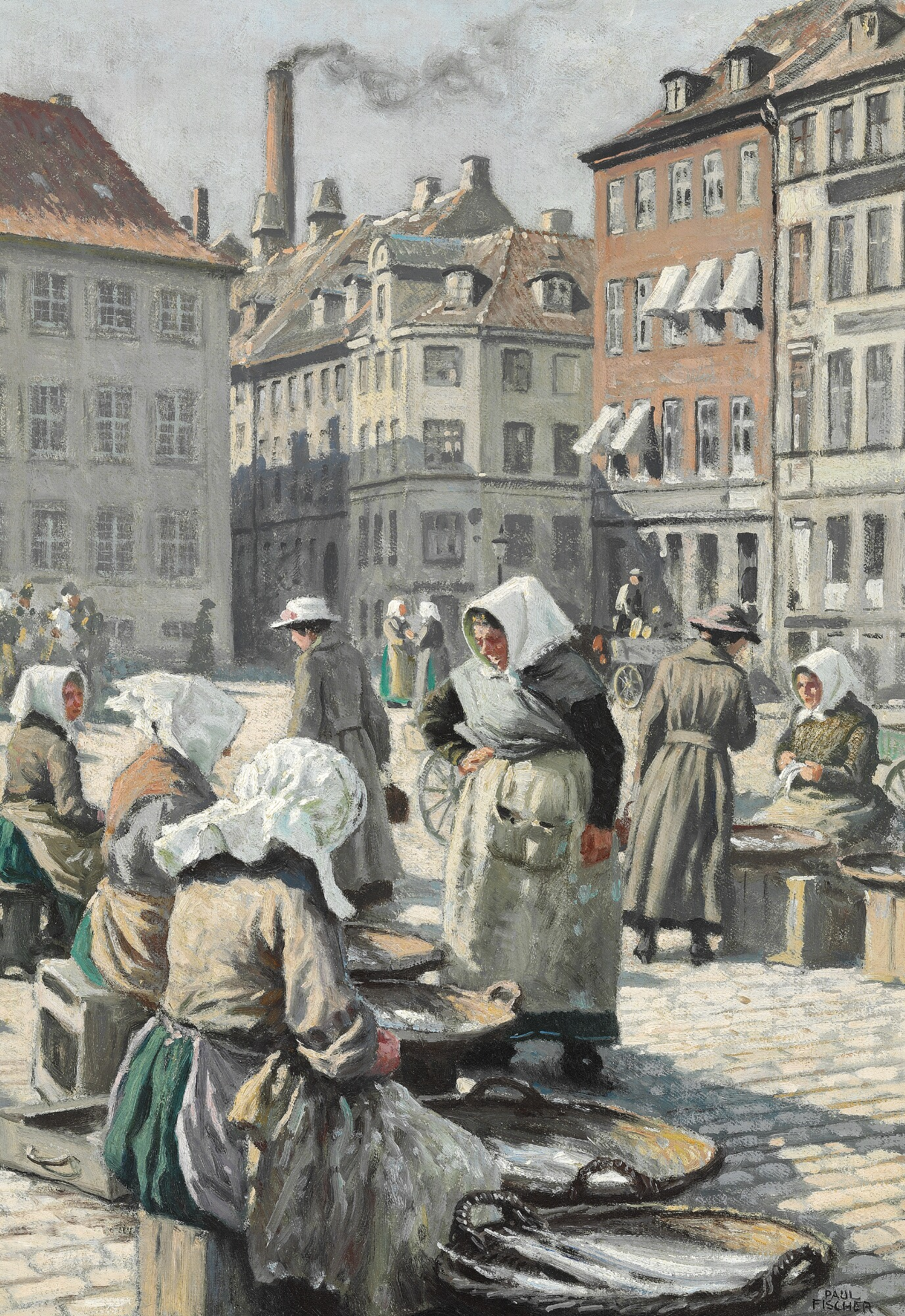
The building seen on a painting by Paul Fischer.

The building was from 1861 owned by Moses Melchior (1825–1912), a son of Gerson and Birgitte Jette Melchior, who had become a partner in the family's trading firm in an early age. He did not himself live in the building. He was unmarried and was at the time of the 1860 census residing with his elder sister Henriette (1815–1902) in an apartment on the second floor at Købmagergade 9. They spent the summers in the rented summer residence Teglgaarden north of Charlottenlund. They were in the family known as "Uncle Moses" and "Aunt Jette". They were like the rest of the Melchior family friends of the writer Hans Christian Andersen.

Lea Melchior resided in the first floor apartment until her death in around 1870. Her former housemaid Amalie (Malle) Salomon was at the time of the 1870 census the only resident in the apartment. The merchant Anton Peter Schou (1828–1901) and his wife Conradine Marie Julia Charlotte Lindholm (1828–1884) resided with their four children (aged 3–14). The broker Hans Peter Brønnum (1830-) and his wife Johanne resided with two children and a maid on the ground floor.

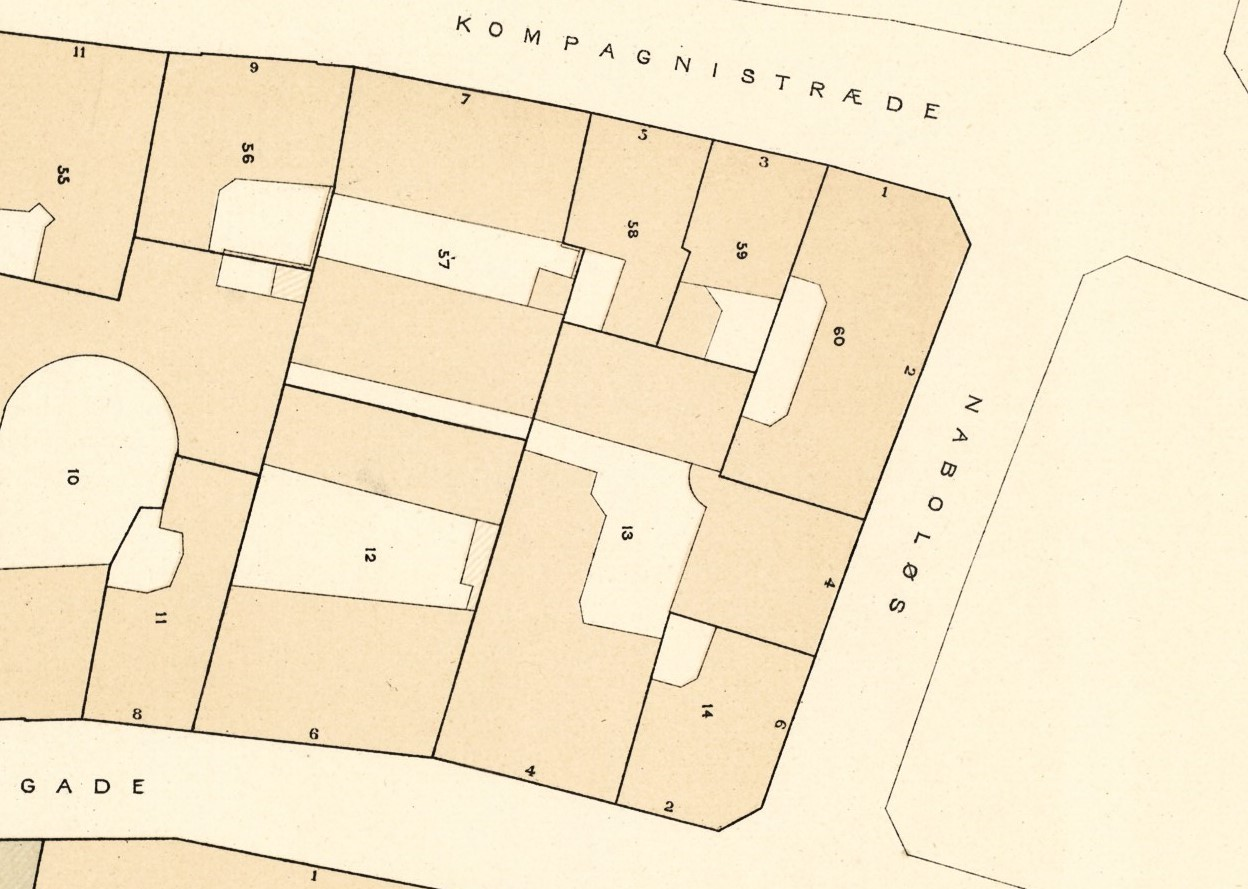
The property seen on a detail from Berggreen's cadastral map of Snaren's Quarter, 1884.

Amalie (Nelly) Henriques (1805–1882), an unmarried daughter of the wealthy broker Ruben Henriques, was by 1880 residing with a maid and two lodgers on the first floor. The lodgers were Jacob August Nørholm (1825-) and Johanne (1829-). The unmarried sisters Mathilde Pauline Jacob (1829-) and Rose Jacob (1834-), daughters of Moses Melchior's half-sister Tose and Jokel Simon Jacob, resided with the widow Hanne Dorthea Møllerstrøm (1826-) and a maid occupied the apartment on the second floor.

=== Henriette Melchiors Stiftelse, 1914–present ===
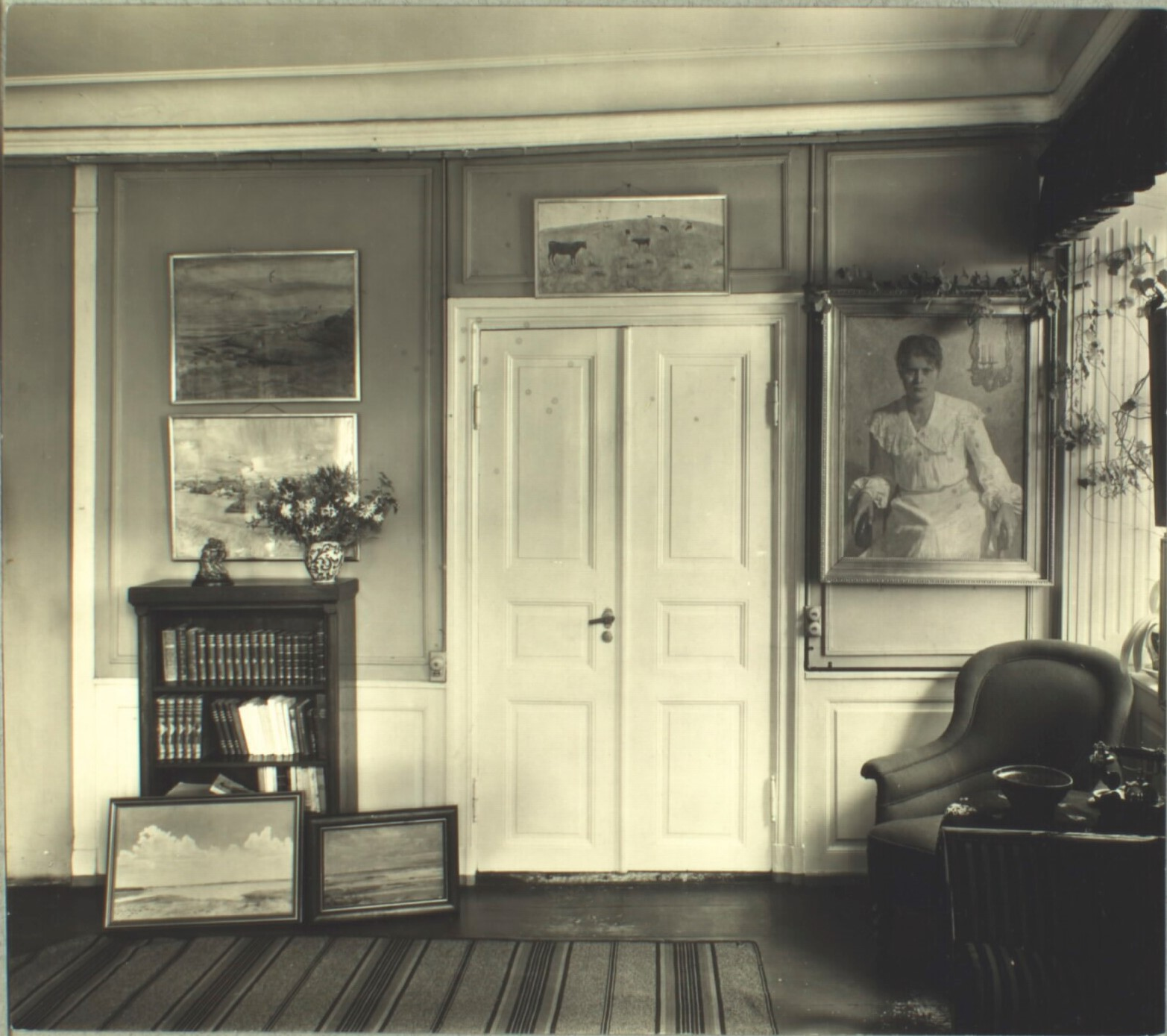
Marianne Vige's living room

The building was by Melchior turned into a charitable foundation named after his sister who had died in 1902. The aim of the foundation was to make the apartments available to widows of artists and scientists at a modest rent. The sisters Mathilde Pauline Jacob and Rose Jacob were granted a right to rent the apartment on the first floor.

Marianne Vige (1892–1945), widow of the painter Jens Vige (1864–1912), was at the time of the 1917 census residing in the ground floor apartment with their mentally handicapped daughter Hellen Margrethe Vige (1909- ) and a maid.

Anden sal: Lauretta Vilhelmine Gudmundsen-Holmgreen (1862–1952), widow of painter and sculptor Johann Gudmundsen-Holmgreen (1858–1912), sønnen Per (1900-). She was also the mother of the sculptor Jørgen Gudmundsen-Holmgreen. Karl Petersen (1890-) and Jens Peter Petersen (1898-), two brothers from Øster Egesborg ved Vordingborg, occupied the garret.

== Architecture ==
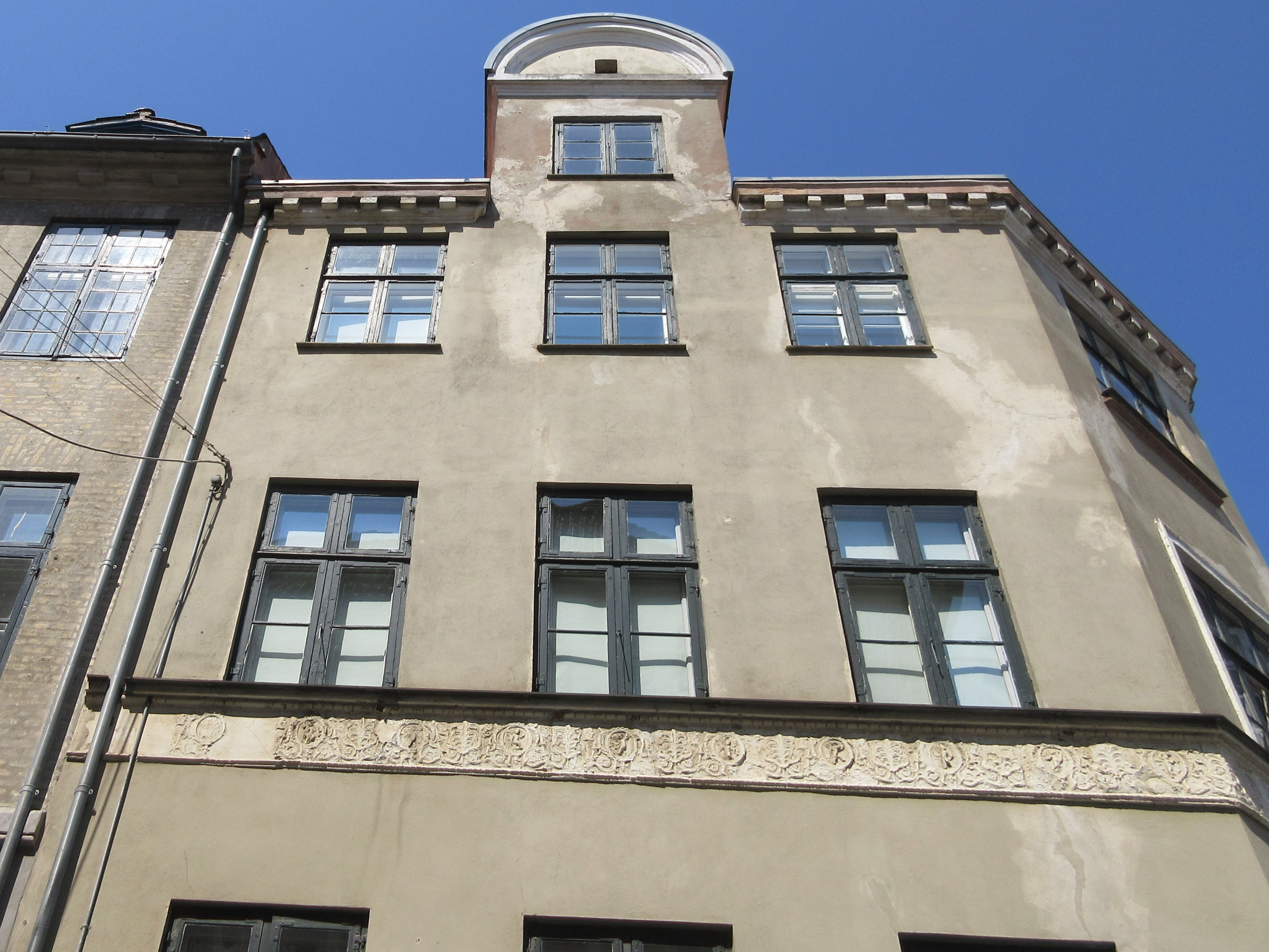
The dormer.

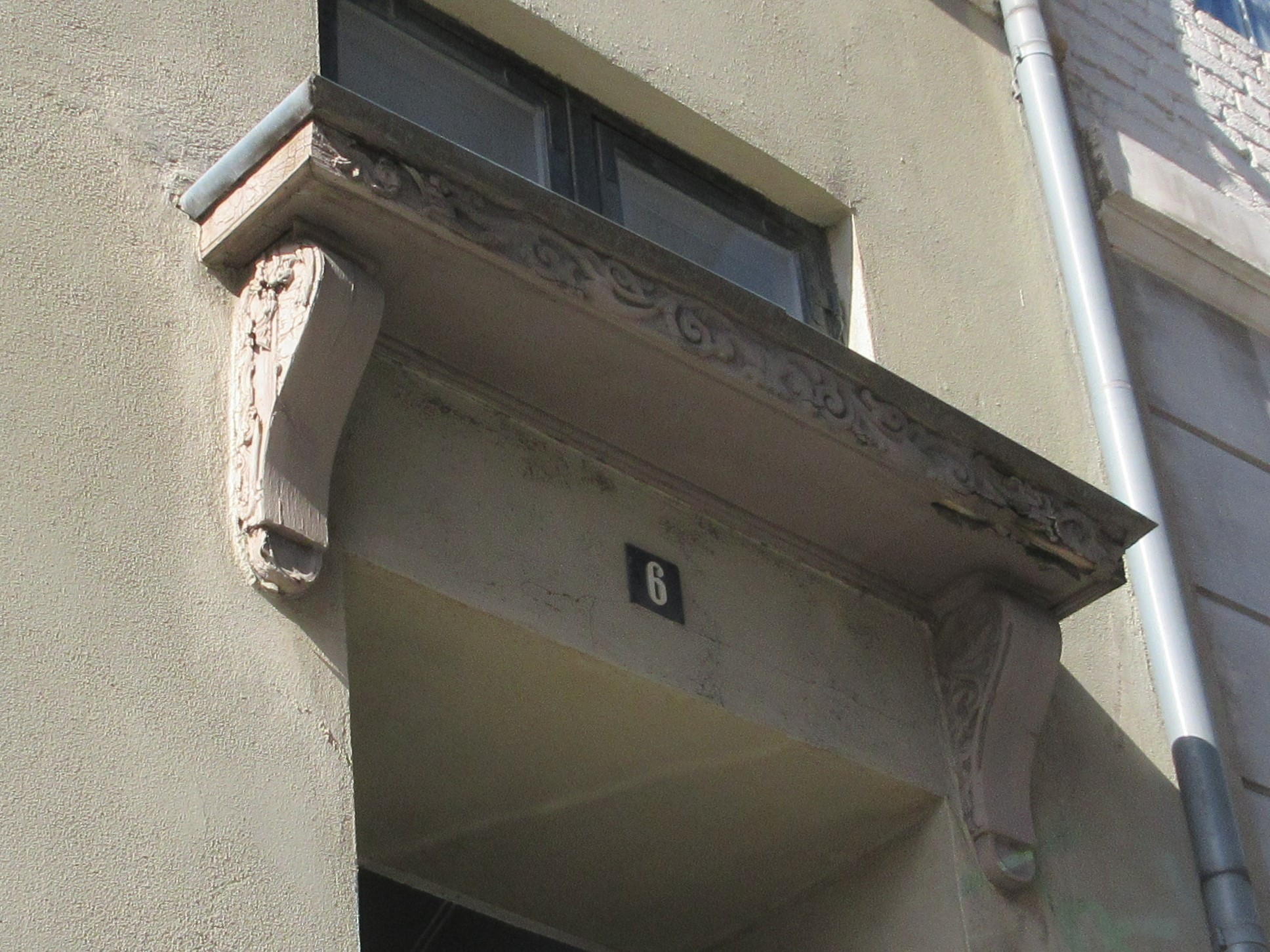
The hood mould above the main entrance

The building is constructed is brick with three storeys over a walk-out basement. The longer facade on Naboløs is five bays long while the shorter one on Snaregade is just three bays long. The chamfered corner bay was dictated for all corner buildings by Jørgen Henrich Rawert's and Peter Meyn's guidelines for the rebuilding of the city after the fire so that the fire department's long ladder companies could navigate the streets more easily. It is plastered and painted in a pale grey colour with white decorative details. The belt course above the ground floor features a stucco frieze with alternating palmette and putto motifs. The frieze dates from the adaption of the building in 1940. The main entrance in the bay furthest to the right in Naboløs is raised seven granite steps from the street level. The hood mould with floral decorations is also from the 1849 renovation. The wider windows on the corner chamfer are accented by more substantial window frames and sills. The facade is finished by a dentillated cornice. The facade on Snaregade is crowned by an arch-headed wall dormer. It was originally topped by a gilded case.

== List of owners ==
- ( - 1756) Andreas Klarup
- (1756–1762) Friedrich Uhl
- (1762 - 1765) Jens Krøjer
- (1765–1776) Johannes Baltzer
- 1776–1793) Cay Friderich Hammerich
- (1749–1816) gift med Gjertrud Christine Sacco (1758–1816).
- /1793-) Lion Israel
