= Moses Marcus Melchior =

Jewish-Danish merchant (1736–1817)

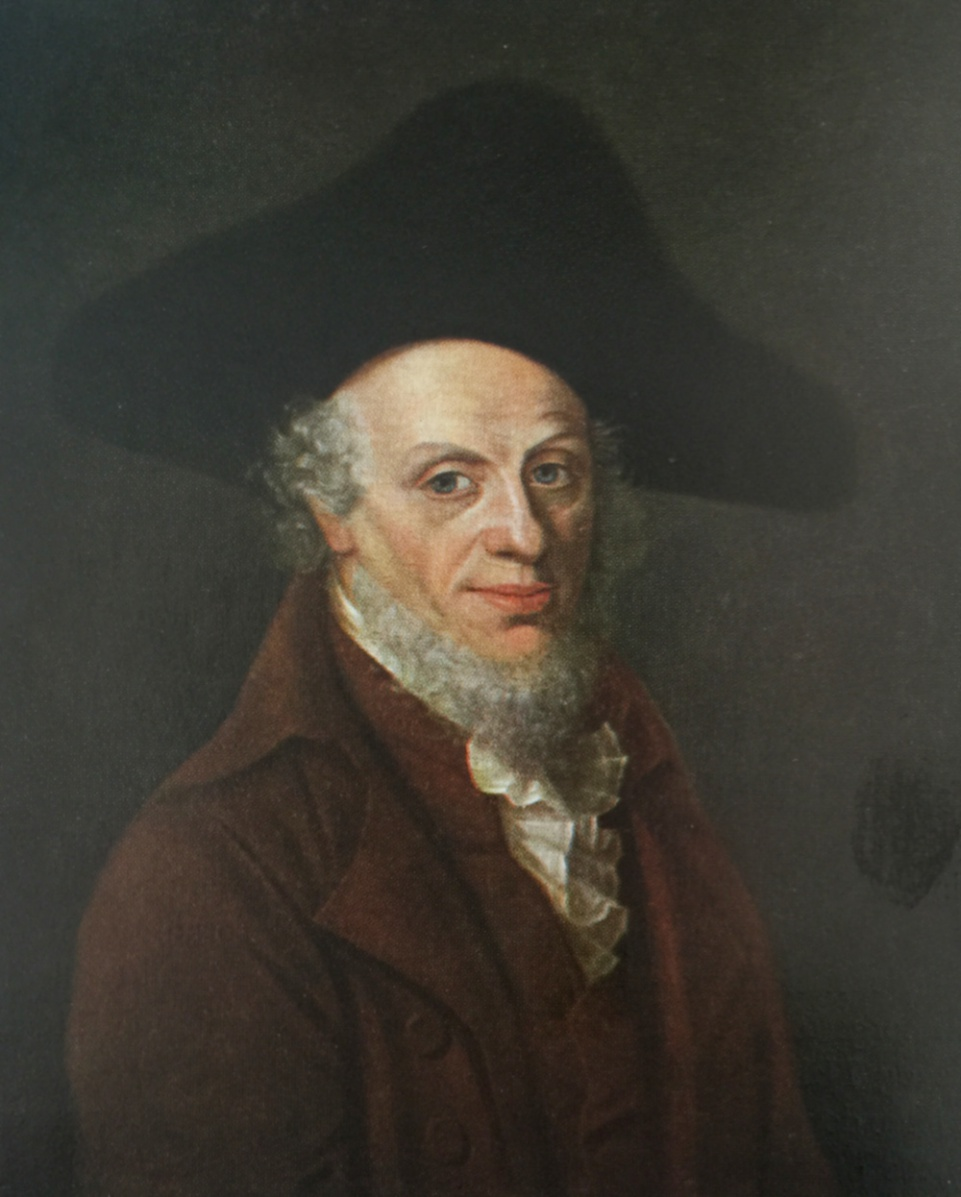
- Born: 1736; Hamburg
- Died: 1817 (aged 80–81); Copenhagen, Denmark
- Occupation: Merchant

Moses Marcus Melchior (1736–1817) was a Jewish-Danish merchant. He founded the trading house Moses & Søn G. Melchior.

== Biography ==
Moses Melchior was born in Hamburg, the son of Marcus Melchior and Zippora Rosbach. He first visited Copenhagen in about 1750 to establish connections for his merchant father and moved there on a permanent basis in 1760. For the first 20 years he dealt mainly with tobacco from the Netherlands and Bremen, partly in partnership with his brother-in-law Akiba Jakobsen. He later founded the trading house Moses & Søn G. Melchior. By 1790 he traded on the Danish West Indies.
