= Moses & Søn G. Melchior =

Danish trading house

Moses & Søn G. Melchior was a trading house based in Copenhagen, Denmark. It traded on the Danish West Indies with its own ships from circa 1820 and was also involved in passenger transport.

== History ==
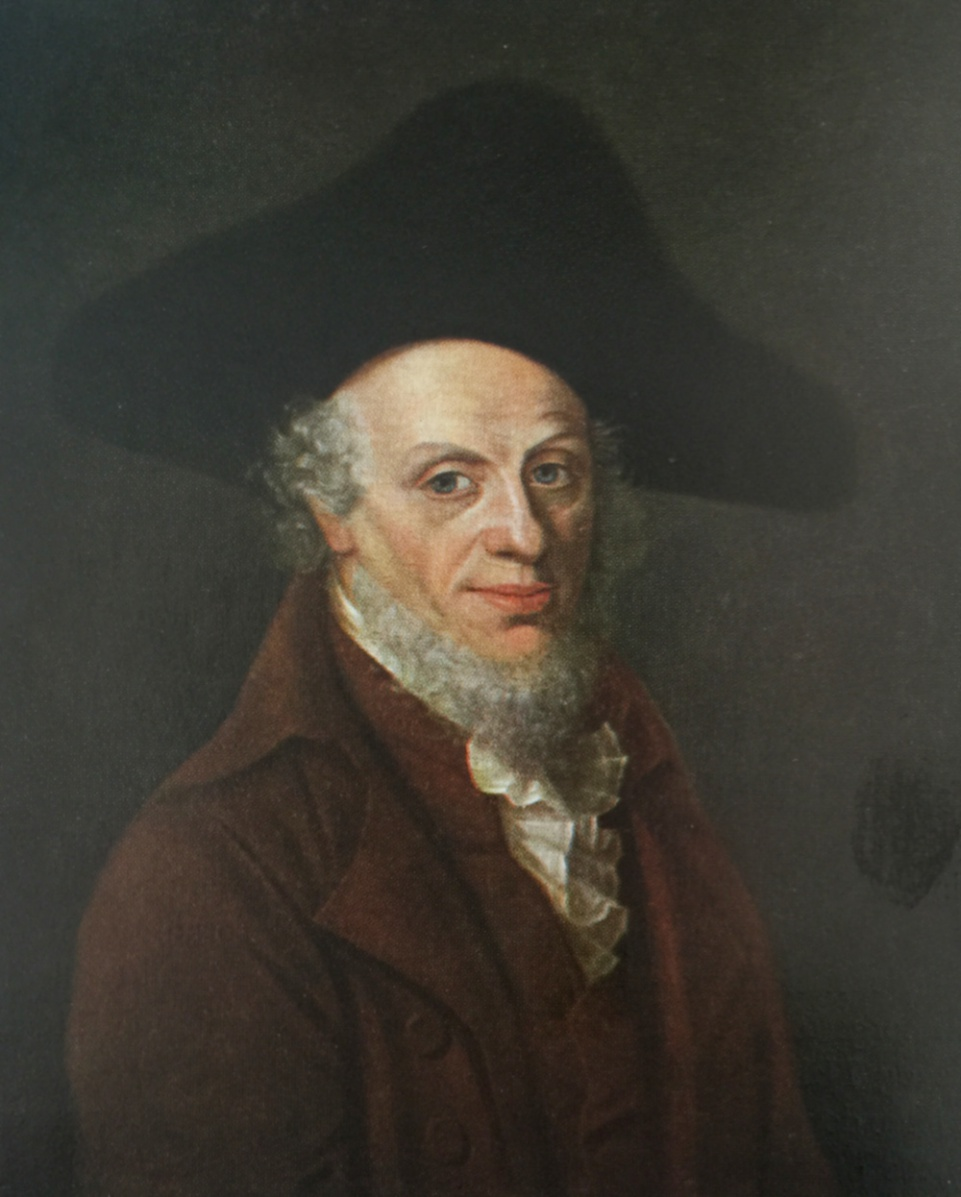
Moses Melchior

The company was founded by Moses Marcus Melchior (1736–1817) in 1760. The company was originally based at Amagertorv 11. The company initially specialized in import of tobacco from the Netherlands but began to trade on the Danish West Indies from circa 1790.

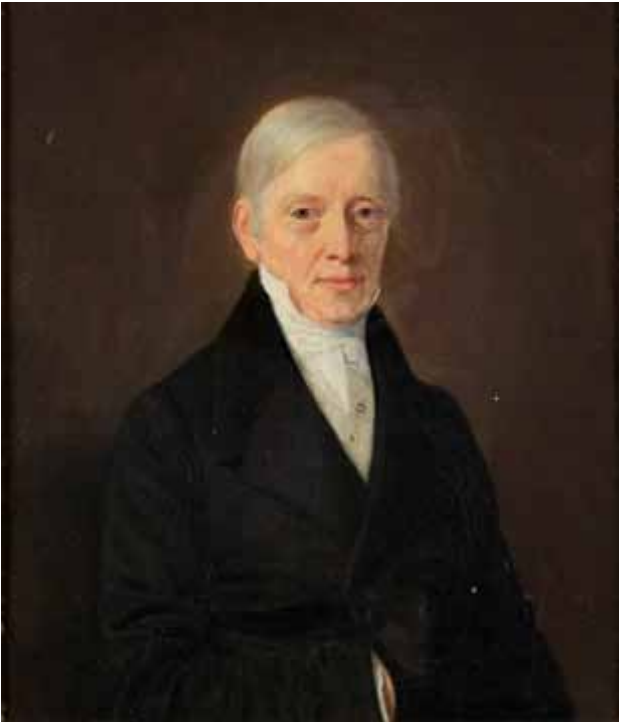
Gerson Moses Melchior (1771–1845) by Emil Bærentzen.

Melchior's son Gerson Melchior (1771–1845) continued the company together with his two eldest sons after his father's death in 1817. The company acquired its first ships in circa 1820. They sailed on the Danish West Indies, both with freight and passengers.

A third brother, Moritz Melchior (1816–1884) joined the company in 1840. One of his elder brothers had died in 1834 and the other one died in 1843; he therefore continued the company alone when his father died in 1845 but his younger brothers Moses Melchior (1825–1912) and Israel Melchior (1827–1893) joined the company in 1848 and 1853. An elder brother, Sally Melchior (1814–1865), established a company in Hamburg in a partnership with his later brother-in-law Bernhard Dehn (1808–1863)

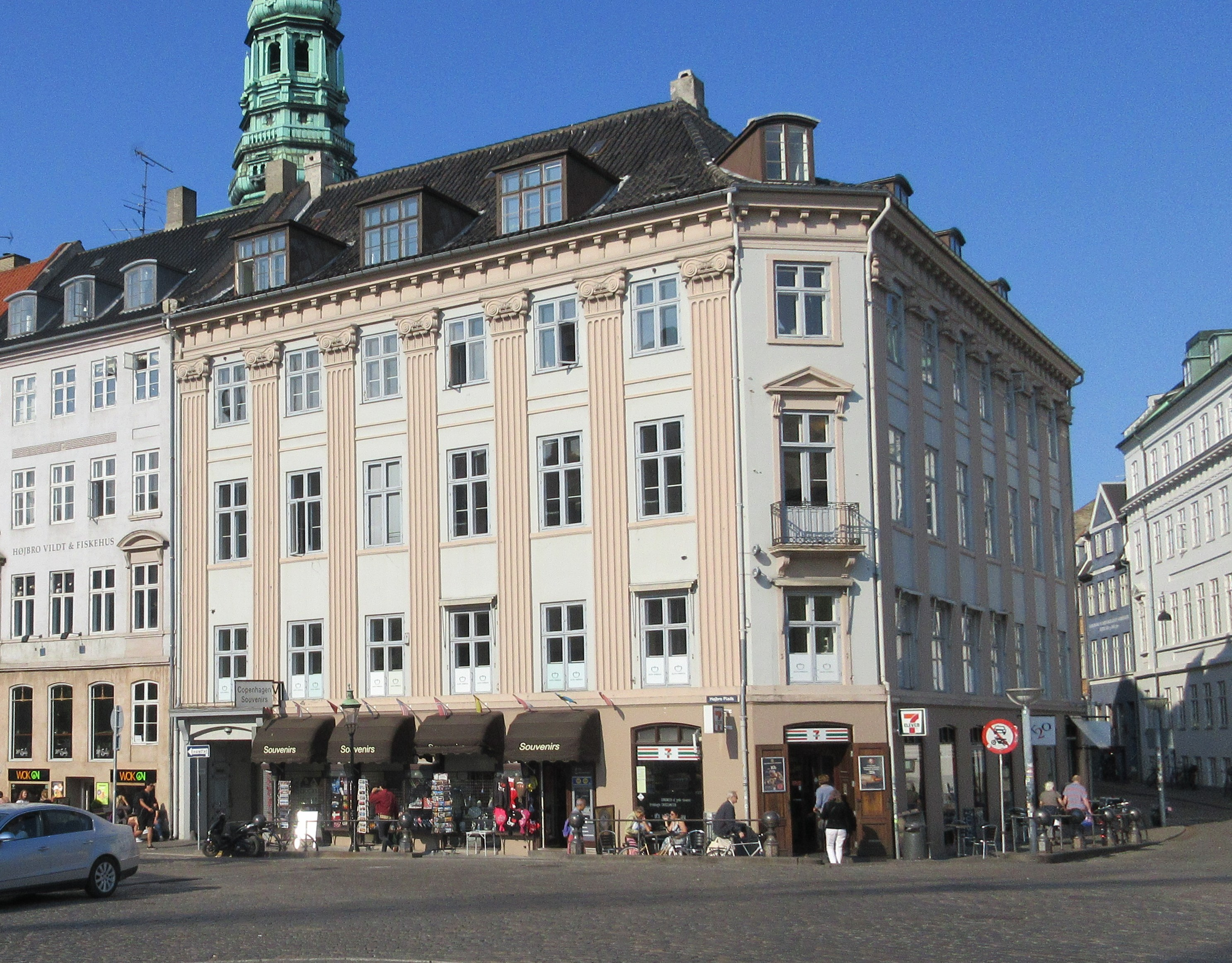
Højbro Plads 21 where the company was based from 1855 to 1912

Moses & Søn G. Melchior relocated to Højbro Plads 21 in 1855. In 1865, it was a co-founder of the company Det Danske Fiskeriselskab. The company owned the whaler Thomas Roys.

Moses Melchior and Moritz Melchior's son Carl Henriques Melchior (born 1855) headed the company after Moritz Melchior's death in 1884. It sold its last ship, Clara, a brig, in 1905.

In 1912, the company relocated to Strandgade 34 in Christianshavn.

== Fleet ==
- 1803 – Birgitte (ID=13637)
- 1814 – Mathilde (ID=9414)
- 1816 – Alexander Magnus (ID=12207)
- 1817 – Emilie
- 1825 – Prins Frederik Carl Christian af Danmark (ID=9302)
- 1827 – Anna (ID=14262)
- 1834 – Hiram (ID=13645)
- 1837 – Christian (ID=8484)
- 1837 – Niord (ID=13528)
- 1839 – Ytiyon (ID=9416)
- 1844 – Christian (ID=12019)
- 1848 – Malvina (ID=3479)
- 1851 – Gerson (ID=9415)
- 1854 – Eurika (ID=13635)
- 1854 – Birgitte Melchior (I) (ID=6962)
- 1855 – Galilei (ID=3386)
- 1855 – Carl(ID=11040)
- 1856 – Birgitte Melchior (II) (ID=13633)
- 1858 – Helge (ID=13638)
- 1859 – Hroar (ID=13640)
- 1859 – Marecahl PELISSIER (ID=13641)
- 1859 – Skalagrimur (ID=13642)
- 1861 – Dorothea Melchior (ID=13527)
- 1863 – Johanne Marie (ID=12107)
- 1866 – Thomas Roys (ID=3121)
- 1866 – Gardar (ID=13646)
- 1868 – Else, kutter, b. i Danzig, 51,68 BRT, 444,48 NRT ex STEINBUTT, indfl. 1871-11-22 until kaptajn L.W. Roed m.fl. og næ. until ELSE, hjs. Nykk.F.
- 1872 – Birgitte Melchior (III) (ID=13644)
- 1875 – Clara (ID=9417)
- 1875 – Henriette Melchior (ID=10585)
- 1877 – Thea (ID=9358)
- 1878 – Freya (ID=13634)
