= Bernhard Ingemann =

Danish architect

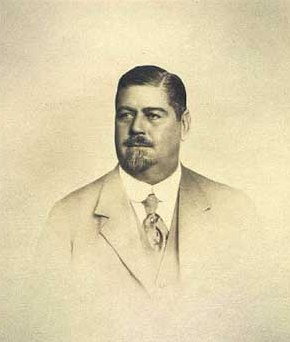
Bernhard Ingemann.

Bernhard Ingemann (21 October 1869 – 28 October 1923) was a Danish architect. He was the son of architect Valdemar Ingemann with whom he collaborated in the first part of his career (1900–1910). His later works include Gutenberghus on Gothersgade in Copenhagen, now home to the Danish Film Institute.

== History ==
Ingemann was born on 21 October 1869 in Copenhagen as the son of architect Valdemar Ingemann and Sophie Margrethe Madsen. He completed as mason's apprenticeship in 1887 and attended Copenhagen Technical School. He attended the Royal Danish Academy of Fine Arts from February 1892 to January 1898. He also worked as a draugshman for the architects Emil Blichfeldt, Albert Jensen and Martin Nyrop.

== Career ==
During the first part of his career, Ingemann collaborated with his father. The collaboration lasted until his father's death in 1911. His first independent work was Gutenberghus on Gothersgade in Copenhagen. The design was influenced by German Hugendstil architecture, with Alfred Messel's Wertheim department store in Berlin as a possible source of inspiration.

== Personal life ==
Ingemann was married twice. His first wife was Anna Møller (1871-1900), a daughter of architect Georg Ebbe Wineken Møller and Constance Sophie Louise Wienberg. They were married on 6 May 1898 in Copenhagen. On 8 October 1901, he was married to Ida Karberg (1879-=, daughter of the businessman Peter Karberg and Helene Dorothea Karberg.

== Selected works ==
=== With Valdemar Ingemann ===
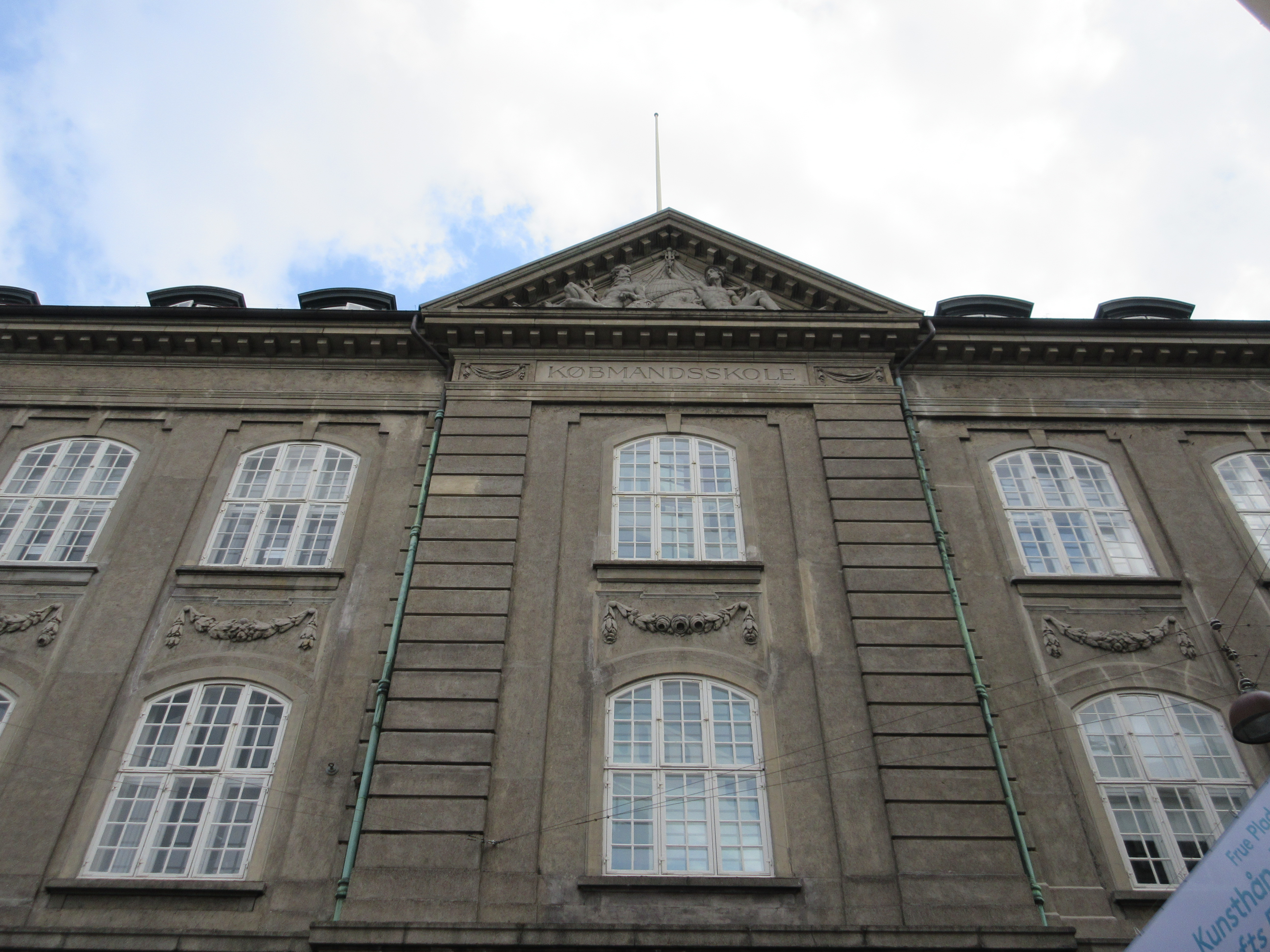
Fiolstræde 41, Copenhagen.

- S. Seidelin Building (now Pressens Hus), Skindergade, Copenhagen (1901)
- Købmandsskolen og Foreningen til Unge Handelsmænds Uddannelse, Fiolstræde 44, Copenhagen (1901–1902)
- Lyngby Søndre Mølle, Kongens Lyngby (1903)
- County hospital, Nykøbing Sjælland (1911)
- Manufakturhandlerforeningens Stiftelse, Bragesgade 26 B, Copenhagen (1909–1910)
- Nørregade 4-6, Copenhagen (1907)
- Skindergade 7, Copenhagen
- Villa Baldersbæk, Vejen Municipality (1910)

=== Independent works ===
- Amaliegade 24, Copenhagen (1893, with F. Christensen)
- Dansk Gardin & Textil Fabrik, Kongens Lyngby (1898)
- Extension of Holger Petersens Tekstilfabrik, Copenhagen (1905)
- Plejehjem for uhelbredelige tuberkulosepatienter (1912)
- Nationalforeningens Sanatoriums plejehjem, Ry (1912)
- Gutenberghus, Gothersgade, Copenhagen (1913-14)
- Villa Strandtofte for Franz Norstrand, Rungsted Strandvej 77, Rungsted (1912-13)
- Danish Naval Hospital, Copenhagen (1914-15, ombygget og vinduer ændret)
- Landmandsbankens Fondsbankafdeling, Laksegade/Asylgade, Copenhagen (1914-16)
- Strandbjerg for Carl Levin, Rungsted Strandvej 179, Rungsted (1916-17)
- Hyldehaverne, Kongens Lyngby, workers' housing for Dansk Gardin & Textil Fabrik (1917)
- Hørsholm Town Hall, Hørsholm (1918)
- Adaption of Emil Glückstadts Mansion, Fredericiagade, Copenhagen
- Landmandsbanken, Aalborg (1920)

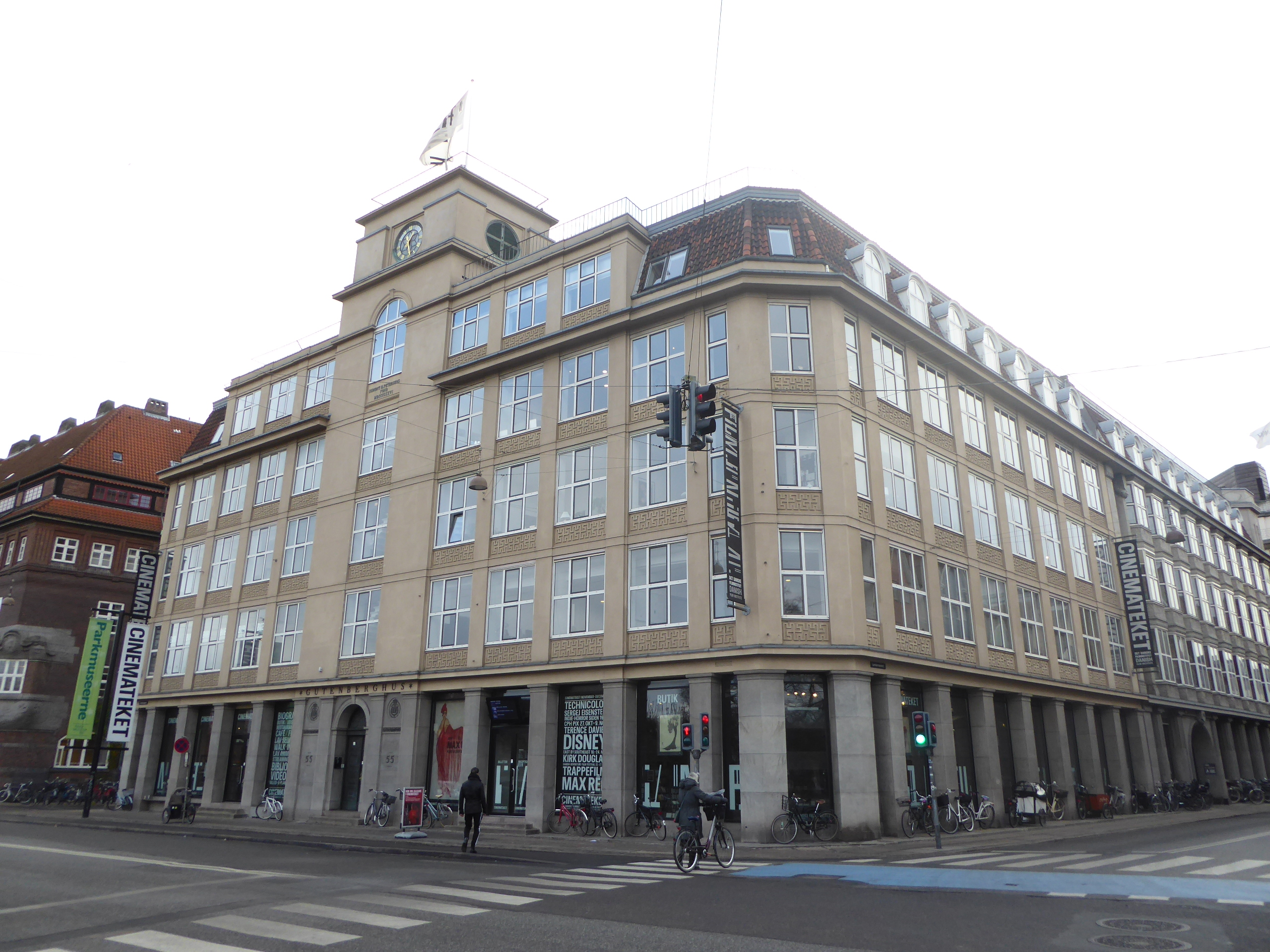
Gutenberghus, Copenhagen (1913-14).

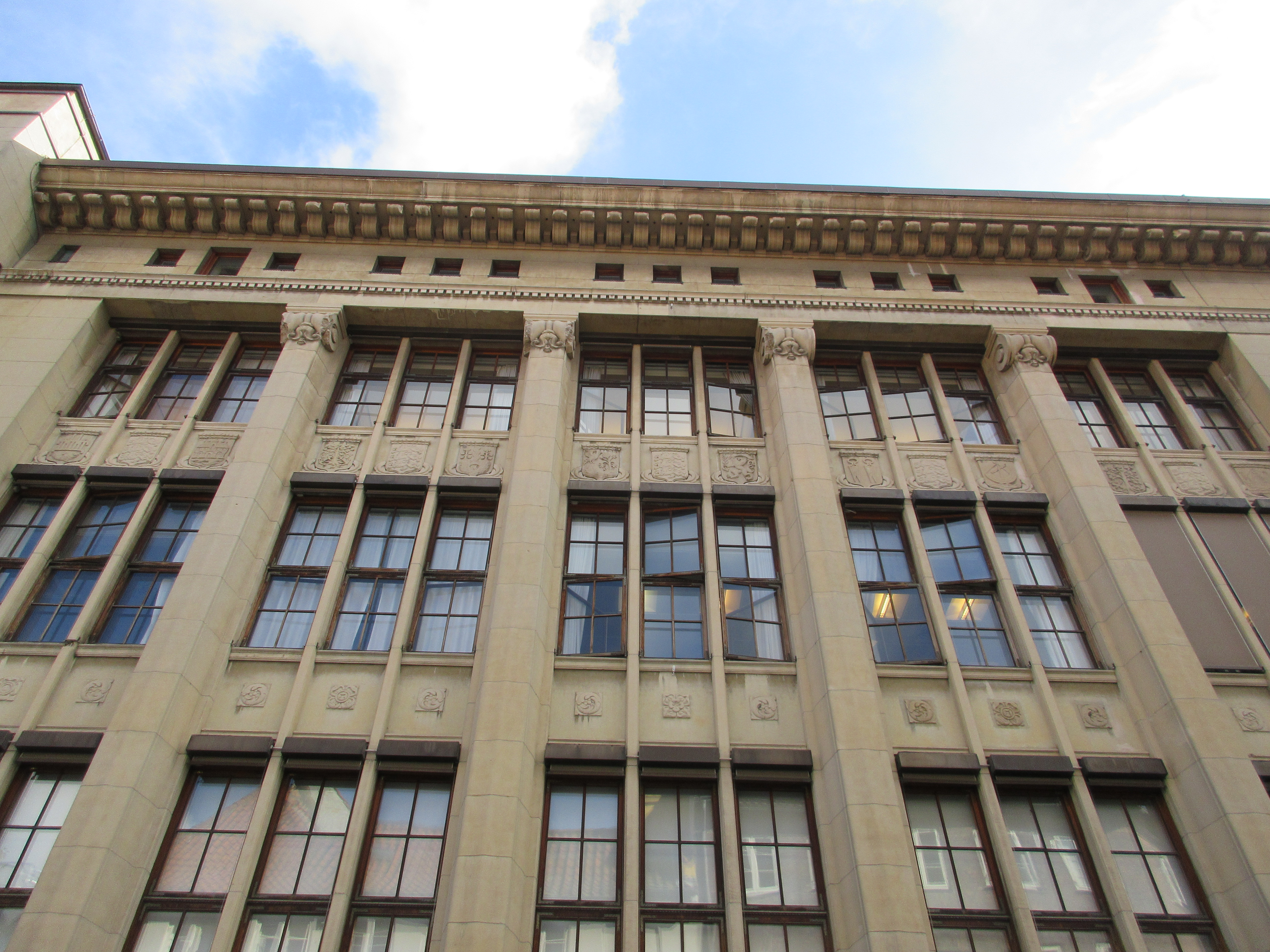
Landmandsbanken, Copenhagen (1913-1016).

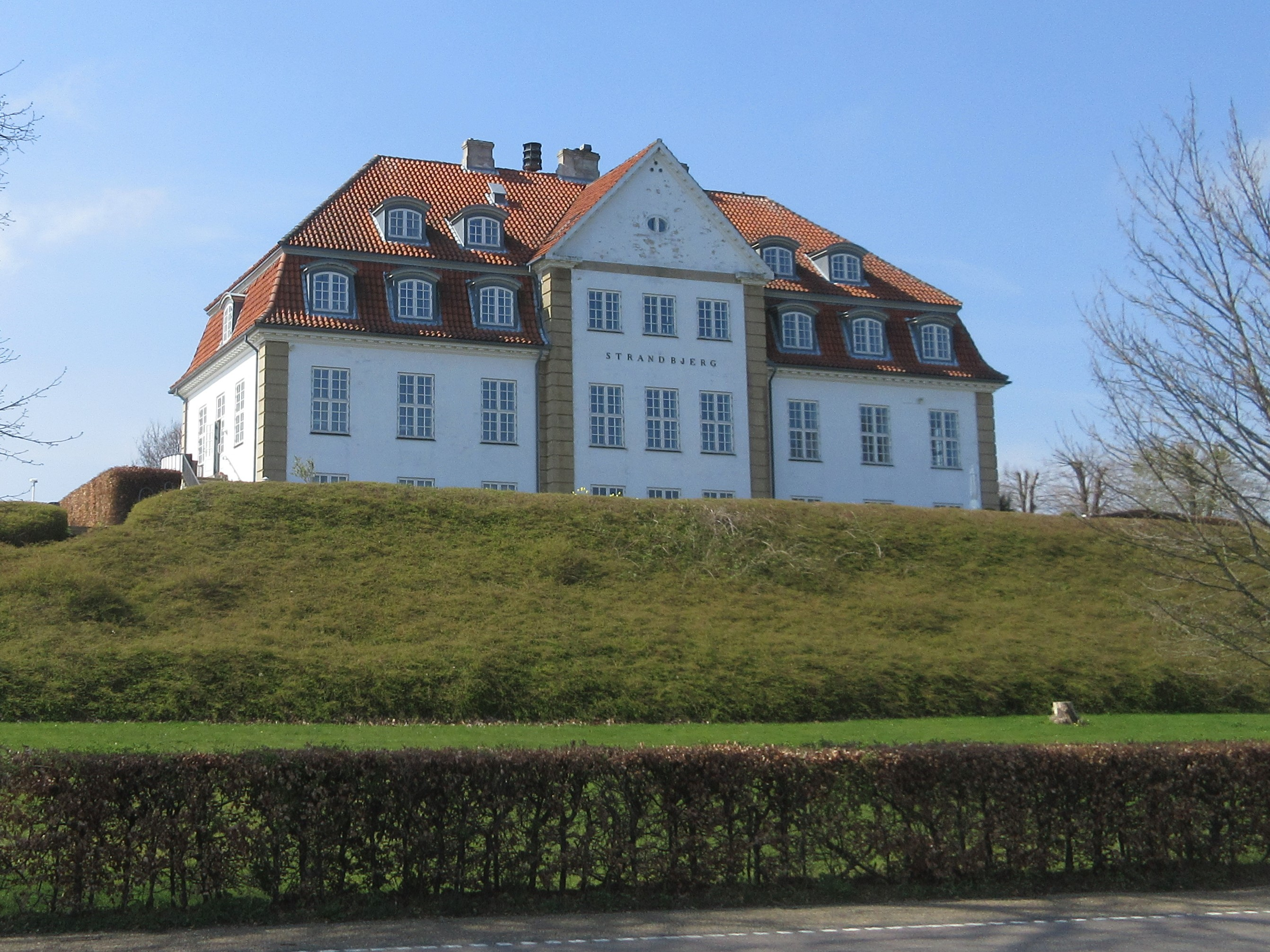
Strandbjerg, Rungsted (1916-17).

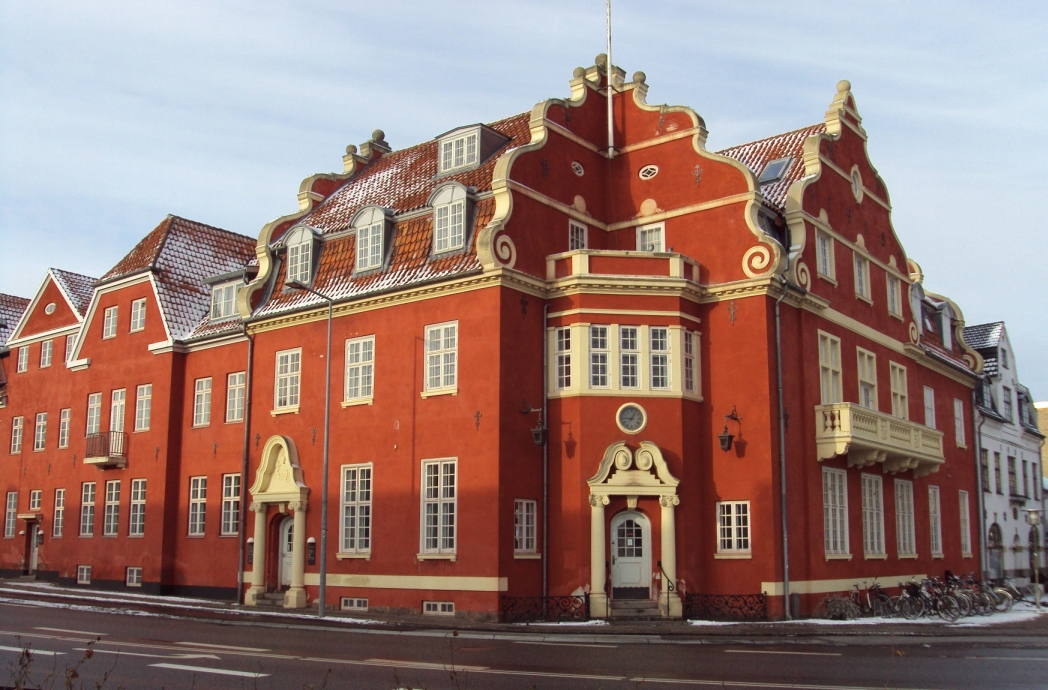
Old Town Hall, Hørsholm (1920)
