= Holger Petersen (Danish businessman) =

Danish merchant (1843-1917)

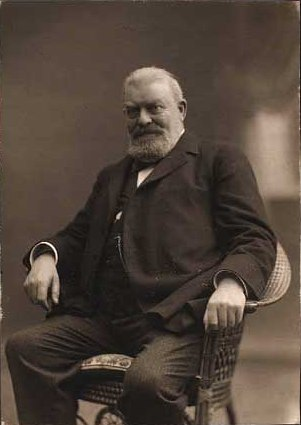
- Born: 9 June 1843
- Died: 26 May 1917 (aged 73)

Holger Petersen (9 June 1843 – 26 May 1917) was a Danish businessman and philanthropist.

== Early life and education ==
Petersen was born on 9 June 1843 on the Lågegård estate at Vejle, the son of farmer Holger Vilhelm Petersen (1809–1849) and Rosalie Vilhelmine Philipsen (1815–1855). Rosalie moved the family to Copenhagen when her husband died in 1849 but the children were separated when she died six years later. Holger Petersen joined the household of schoolmaster Carl Mariboe. He became a merchant's apprentice in his maternal uncle Arnold Philipsen's wholesale company on Store Købmagergade in 1858. He left the company in 1862m initially with the ambition of storying law. At the outbreak of the Second Schleswig War in 1864, he immediately enrolled as a volunteer and was severely wounded in the Battle of Lundby on 3 July. After the war he returned to his uncle's company where he worked as a traveling salesman in the provinces. In 1866 he moved to England. After a while, he was employed as a salesman for a spinning mill and a rubber factory. In January 1867, he returned to Copenhagen.

== Career ==
=== Textule industry ===
In September 1868, Petersen was granted a license as a merchant in Copenhagen and established a trading house under his own name in Nygade. It traded in a wide range of products within the textile industry. The company moved to new premises on Købmagergade in 1868 and relocated to the old Vajsenhus building on the same street (No. 44) in 1875. His company purchased the entire complex in 1888. It was subsequently adapted and expanded several times, most notably in 1889–1890 and 1906–1907.

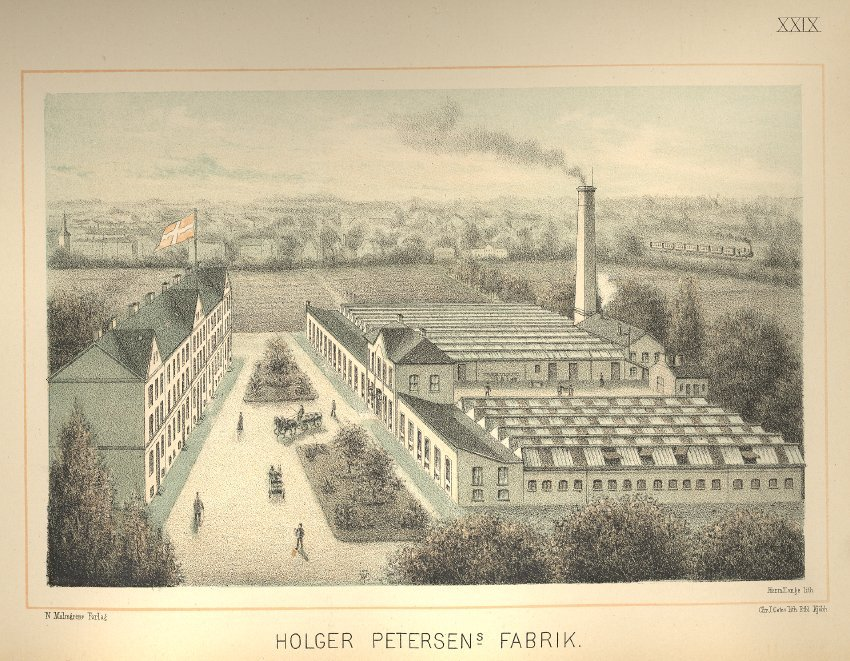
Holger Petersen's Textile Factory on Tagensvej

In 1878, Petersen and his brother John established a textile factory in Store Kongensgade. The factory relocated to larger premises on Tagensvej in 1883. The Tagensvej factory was later expanded several times. The activities comprised woolen textiles, ribbons and buttons. The factory was established as a separate company but was acquired by Holger Petersen's trading house after his death in 1917. The company established a subsidiary in Stockholm in 1889 and opened a factory in Malmö in 1893. The Malmö factory was turned into a separate company in 1894 under the name Fabriksaktiebolaget Skandinavien.

He was a co-founder of Foreningen af danske manufaktur-grossister and was president of the organisation for many years. He was a member of Grosserer-Societetet's committee from 1904 to 1917.

In 1895, Petersen was a co-founder of Dansk Exportforening. He was also a board member of the Danish East Asiatic Company from its foundation in 1897 and served as chairman from 1910.

=== Danish West Indies ===
Petersen was also involved in the efforts to revive the economy of the Danish West Indies but with little success. He was a co-founder of Dansk vestindisk plantageselskab in 1900. In July 1900, the company bought the plantations Castle Cockley, Pearl and Cassavagarden on Saint Croix. In 1902, he became a board member of the plantation company Dansk Vestindien. In 1903, he was part of a delegation which traveled to the Danish West Indies and purchased a number of new plantations on the three islands.

Petersen visited the islands again in 1905 and in 1910–1911. In 1909, he was a driving force behind A/S Vestindisk sukkerfabrik's acquisition of Jacob Lachmann's sugar refinery on Saint Croix and was himself appointed as chairman of the board. He divested in the activities when the Danish West Indies when the discussion about a possible sale of the islands to the US was revived and.

=== Jutland ===
Petersen was a co-founder of Plantningsselskabet Staushede in 1880. In 1891, he planted the Baldersbæk plantation, which was more than 500 hectares (1,200 acres). In 1895, Petersen purchased Hølund in a partnership with Christian Dalgas. On a journey to the area in 1892, he also convinced other wealthy businessmen to invest in plantations. He became a board member of Hedeselskabet in 1907 and was its vice chairman from 1910.

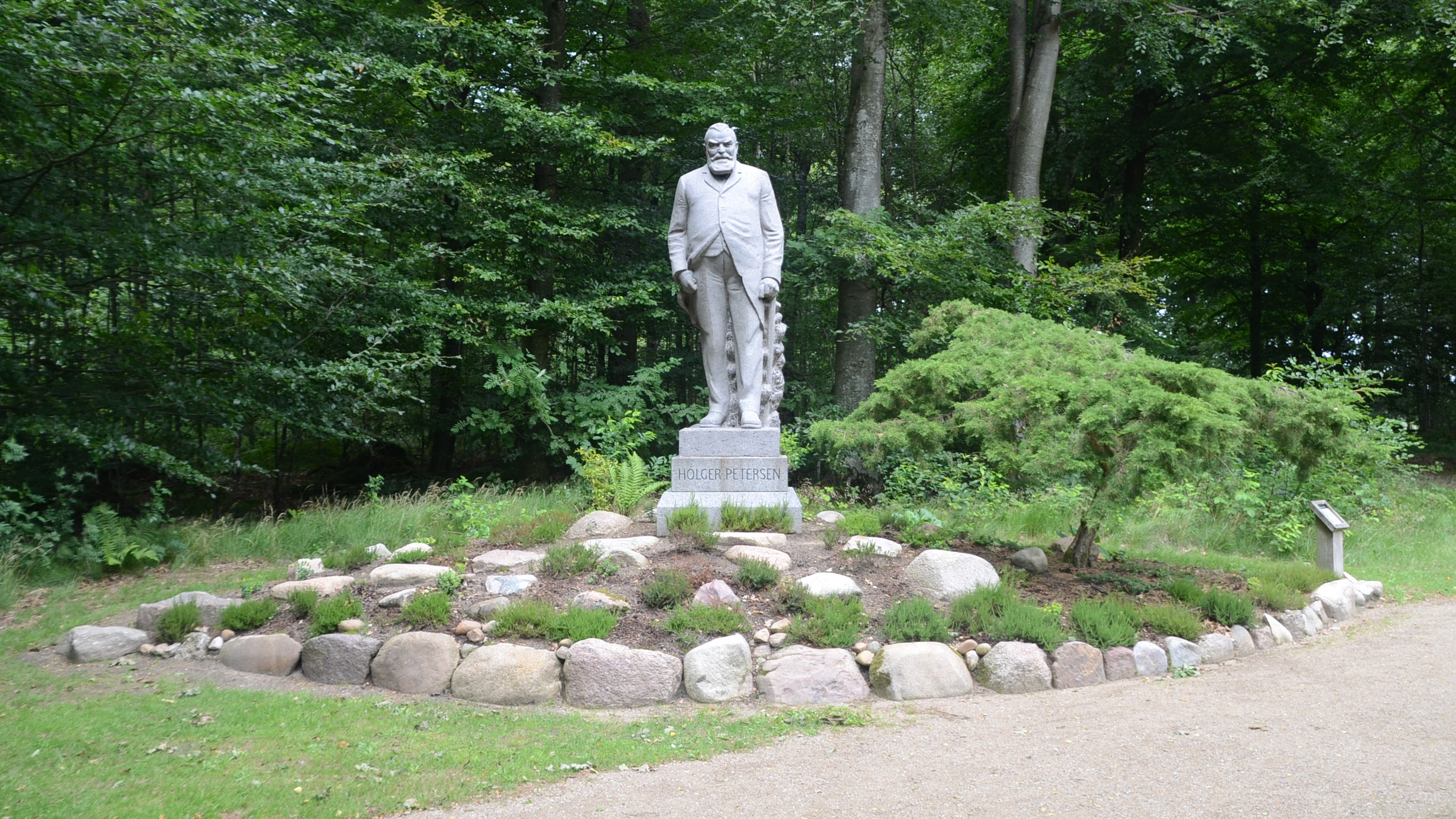
Statue by Anders Bundgaard at Baldersbæk

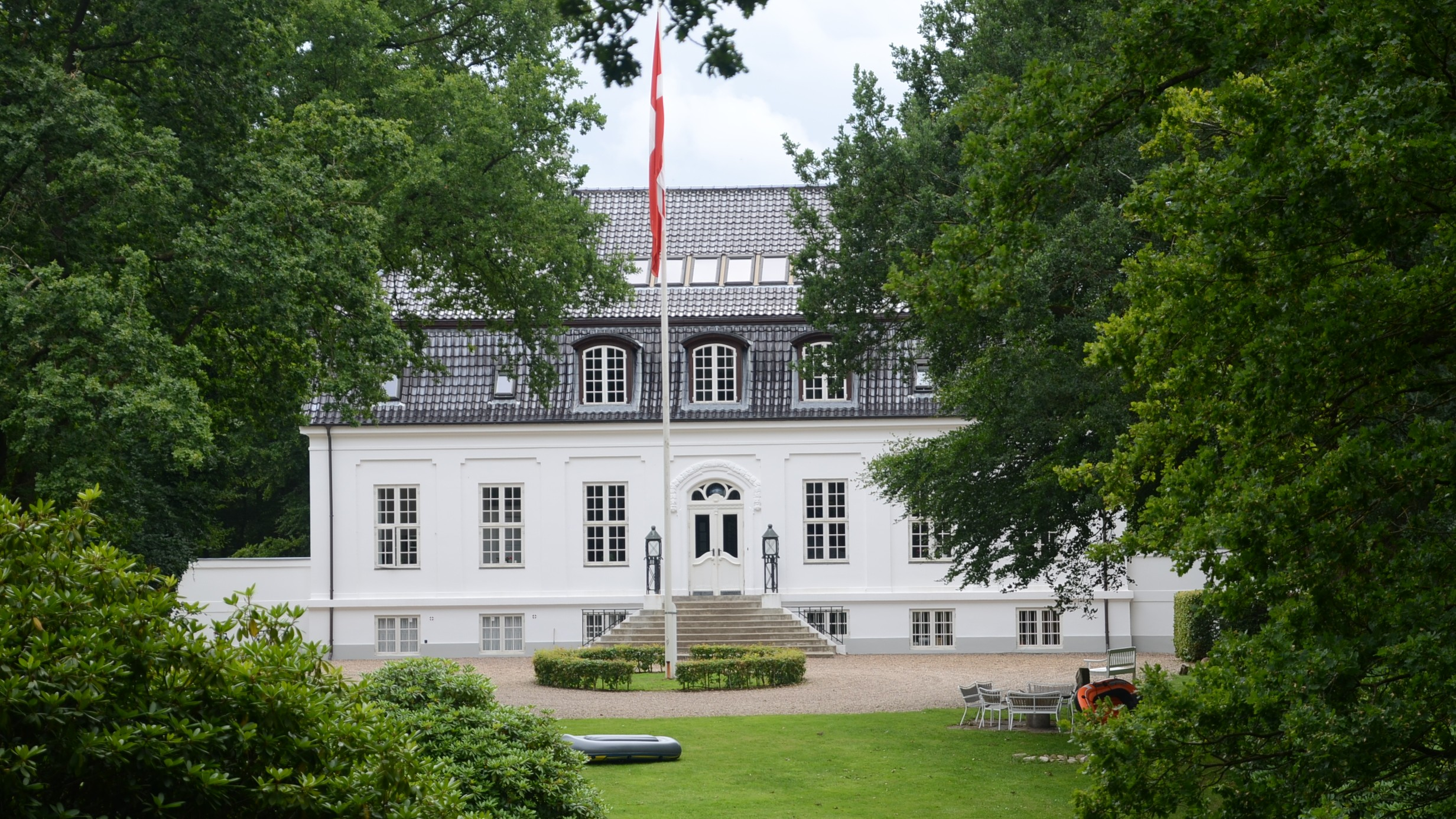
Holger Petersen's villa Baldersbæk

== Politics and philanthropy ==
Petersen represented Højre in Landstinget from 1909 and was a member of the Defence Commission of 1902.

Petersen was strongly involved in the promotion of Danish culture in Sønderjylland from 1889, collaborating with H.P. Hanssen and members of Radikale Studentersamfundsmænd such as H. V. Clausen and Niels Hjort. He contributed actively to realizing Clausen's Foreningen af 5. Oktober (Association of 5 October), a secret credit institution which contributed to keeping North Schlesvig land on Danish hands against the explicit policy of the Prussian government.

Holger Petersen was deeply involved in work to improve the education of merchants in Denmark. He was active in the Association for the Education of Young Merchants (Foreningen til unge handelsmænds uddannelse).

== Personal life and legacy ==
Holger Petersen married Augusta van Aller (13 May 1847 – 29 October 1878), daughter of Dutch consul in Helsingør Peter Rist van Aller (1800–1885) and Elisabeth Birgitte Johanne Hoppe (1806–1885), on 25 April 1872. Their only child, a son, died in 1895. After that Petersen made his two cousins, Andreas (1850–1937) and Peter Johan Ditlev (1857–1923), partners in the company. He established Holger Petersen's Foundation with an initial capital of DKK 7 million by testament of 2 December 1919.

Petersen died on 26 May 1917 and was buried in Assistens Cemetery in Copenhagen.
