= Asylgade =

Street in Copenhagen, Denmark

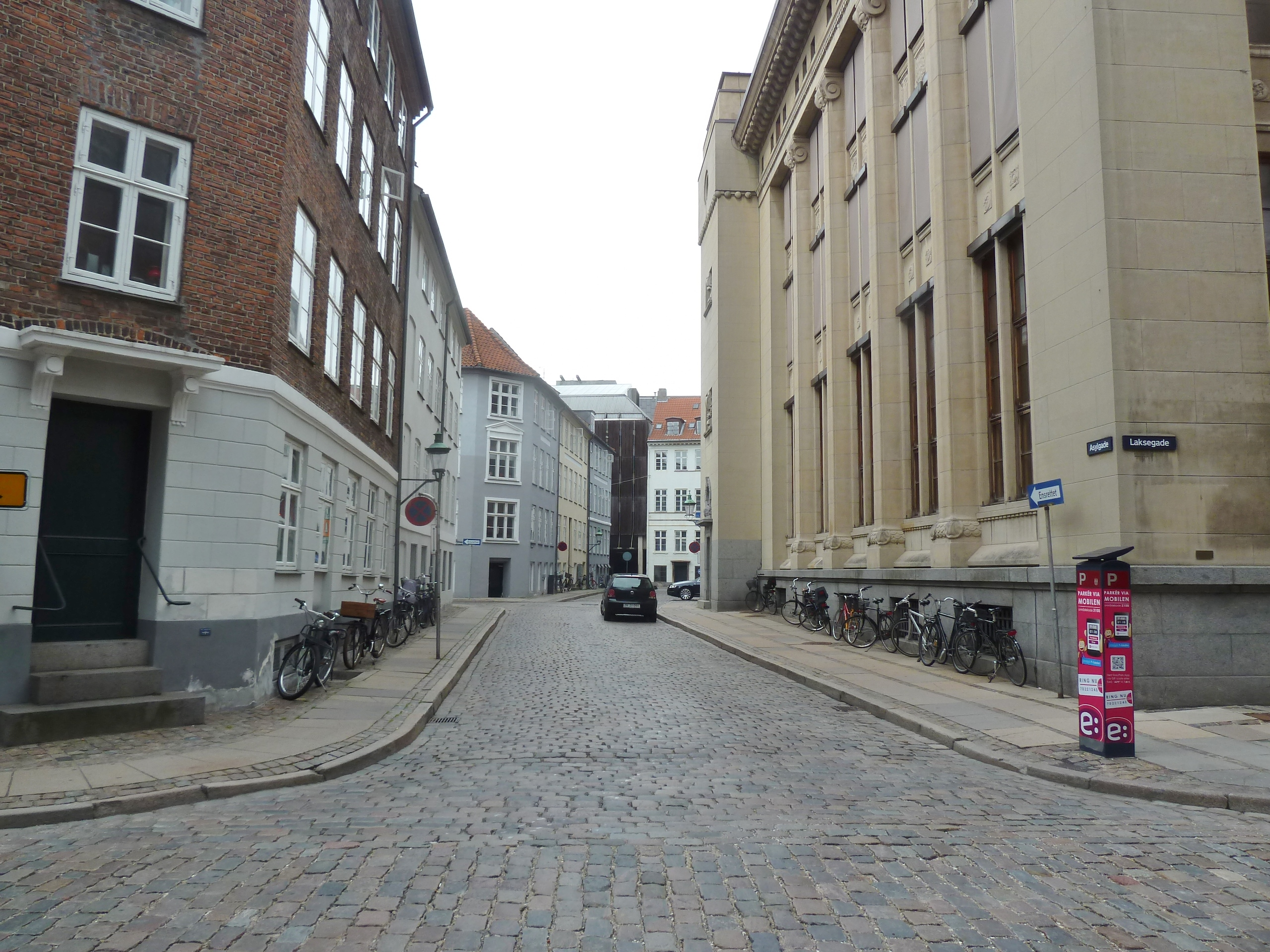
- Length: 75 m (246 ft)
- Location: Copenhagen, Denmark
- Quarter: Indre By
- Nearest metro station: Kongens Nytorv
- Coordinates: 55°40′42″N 12°35′1.92″E
- North end: Vingårdsstræde
- South end: Laksegade

Asylgade (lit. "Asylum Street") is a street in the Old Town of Copenhagen, Denmark. It runs from Vingårdstræde in the north to Laksegade in the south.

== History ==
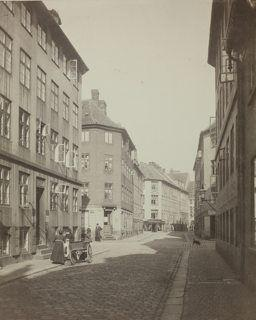
Asylgade photographed by Frederik Riise

The street was originally called Nellikegade. Copenhagen's first daycare (Asylum) for children of women working outside the home opened at No. 11 in 1835. The street received its current name after it in 1859. The institution moved to new premises in Adelgade in 1937.

== Buildings ==
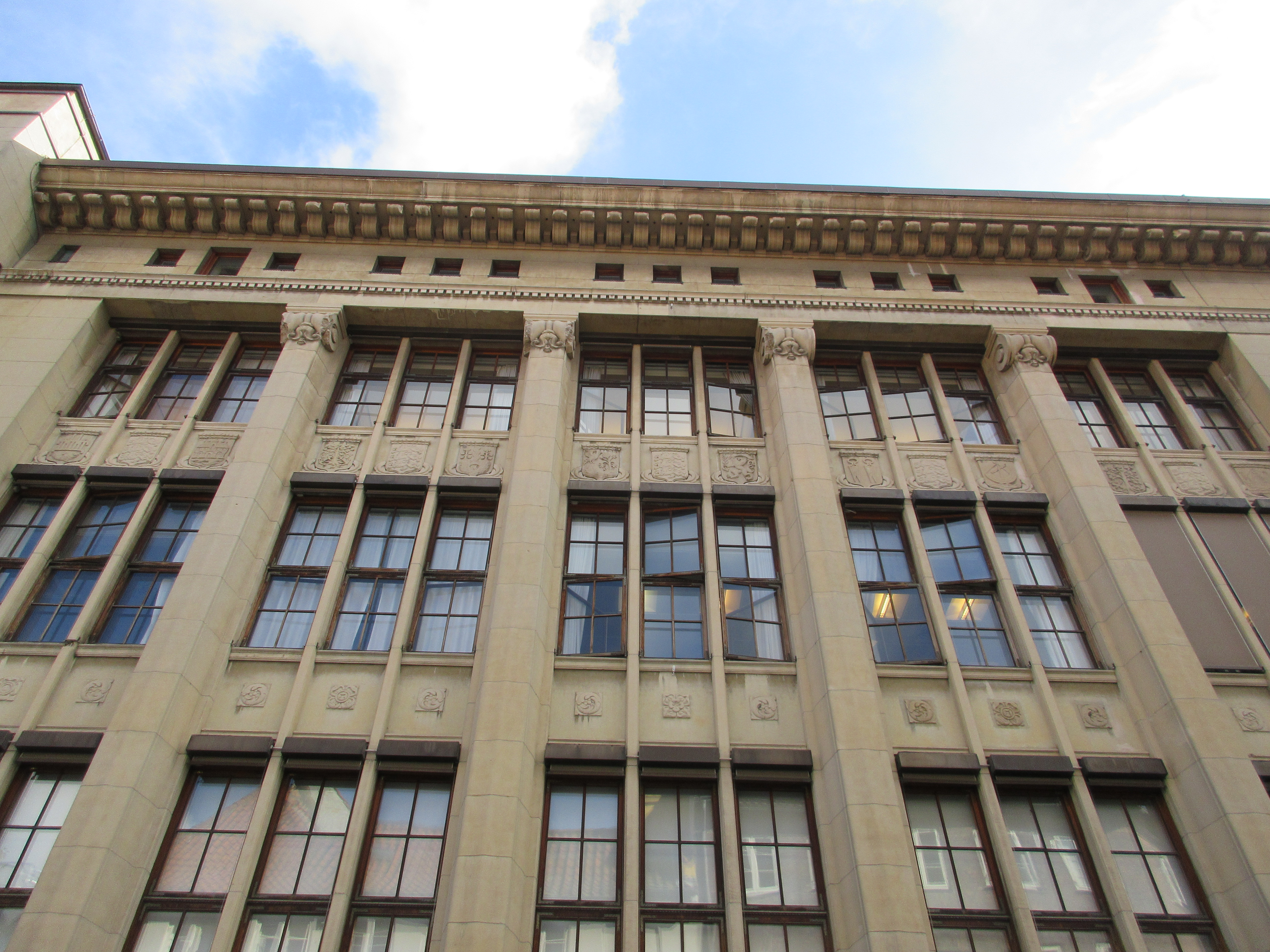
Asylgade 7 which was built for Landmandsbanken in 1914-16

The corner building at Asylgade 2 / Vingårdstræde 9 was built in 1797 for ship builder Lars Larsen. The corner building at Asylgade 8 / Dybensgade 1 was built by master builder Johan Diderich Backhausen (1771–1850) in 1796. Nest to it is a four-bay, four-storey building.

The building at Asylgade 7 / Laksegade 8-10 was built in 1914-1916 for Landmandsbanken to design by Bernhard Ingemann. The building at Asylgade 1-3 /corner with Vingårdsstræde) is a multi-storey parking facility from 1969. It was designed by Tyge Holm & Flemming Grut.
