= Christian Hasselbalch =

Danish industrialist and merchant (1851–1925)

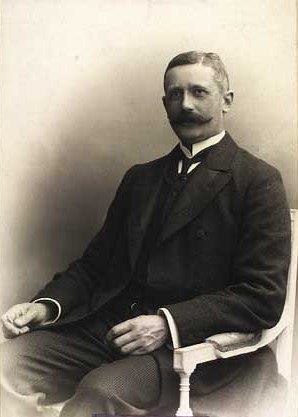
- Hasselbalch photographed by Julie Laurberg in 1903
- Born: 27 February 1851; Randers, Denmark
- Died: 7 August 1925 (aged 74); Rungsted, Denmark
- Occupations: businessman, industrialist

Christian Hasselbalch (27 February 1851 – 7 August 1925) was a Danish industrialist and merchant. He founded Hasselbalch & Co.

== Early life ==
Christian Hasselbalch was born into a family of merchants in Randers. His parents were merchant Steen Hasselbalch (1820–1861) and Caroline Margrethe Hasselbalch née Hoge (1826–1893). He attended Randers Lærde Skole until 1865 and then apprenticed as a textile merchant in Århus. He later became a retail clerk at Vett & Wessel's new branch in Horsens until he was appointed as manager of the company's Nakskov branch in 1876.

== Hasselbalch & Co. ==
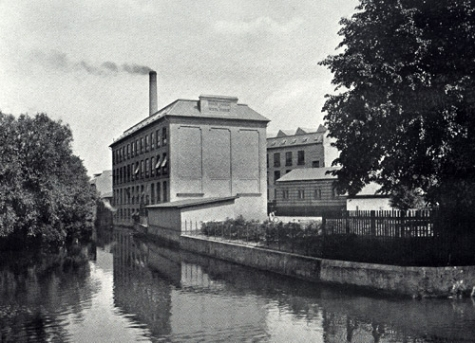
The curtain factory in Kongens Lyngby

In 1892, Hasselbalch was licensed as a wgilesale merchant (grosserer) in Copenhagen and started his own business. In 1889, he became the first manufacturer of curtains in Denmark. The company was initially based in rented rooms at Peter Bangs Vej with just one loom. He later acquired Lyngby Søndre Mølle in Kongens Lyngby and opened a new factory at the site in 1892. It was expanded several times and became the largest employer in the town. In the 1890s, he also established curtain factories in both Sweden and Norway.

In 1910, he started Dansk Merceriseringsanstalt. He remained active in the companies until his death.

== Other professional engagements ==
He was a member of the Maritime and Commercial Court (Sø- og handelsretten) from 1892 to 1906. From 1909 to 1924, he chaired Privatbanken's bank council. He also sat on the board of DFDS.

== Philanthropy ==
Hasselbalch was also a patron of the arts and a benefactor of several social courses. He was involved in the construction of workers' housing in Kongens Lyngby and was active in the Association for Resocialisation of Ex-convicts which was founded in 1902 as well as work among citizens with disabilities.

== Personal life and legacy ==
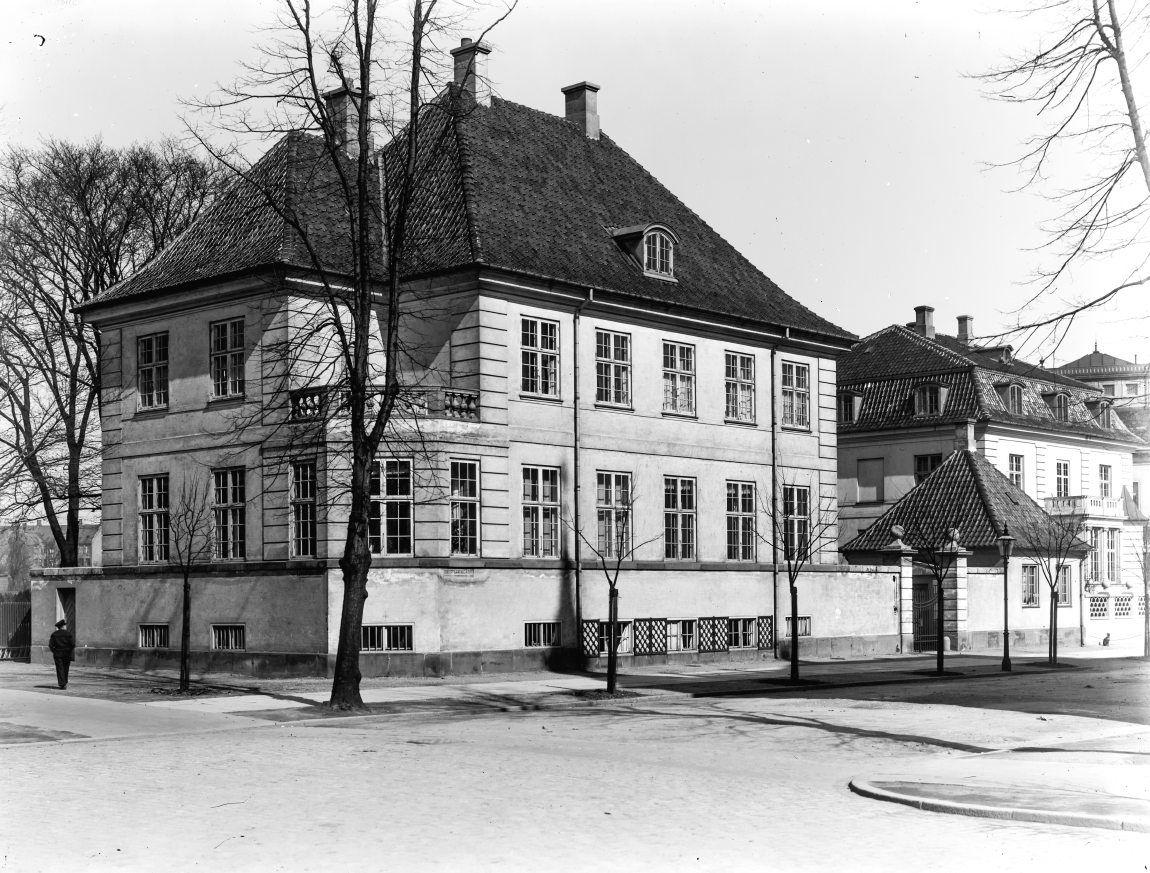
Hasselbalch's house at Kristianiagade 1 in Copenhagen

Hasselblach married Marie Mathilde Frederikke Helms (23 April 1866 – 18 May 1951), daughter of merchant Ehrenreich Christoffer Ludvig Moltke Helms (1829–1902) and Caroline Hansine Horsens (1821–1913), on 22 July 1885 in St. John's Church in Nørrebro. The marriage was later dissolved. They had three children: Alice grevinde Danneskjold-Samsøe; Hugo Helms Hasselbalch and Erik Helms Hasselbalck

Hasselbalch lived in a villa at Kristianiagade 1 in Østerbro. He was made a Knight in the Order of the Dannebrog in 1903, a 2nd-class Commander in 1910 and a 1st-class Commander in 1921. He was awarded Dannebrogordenens Hæderstegn in 1906.

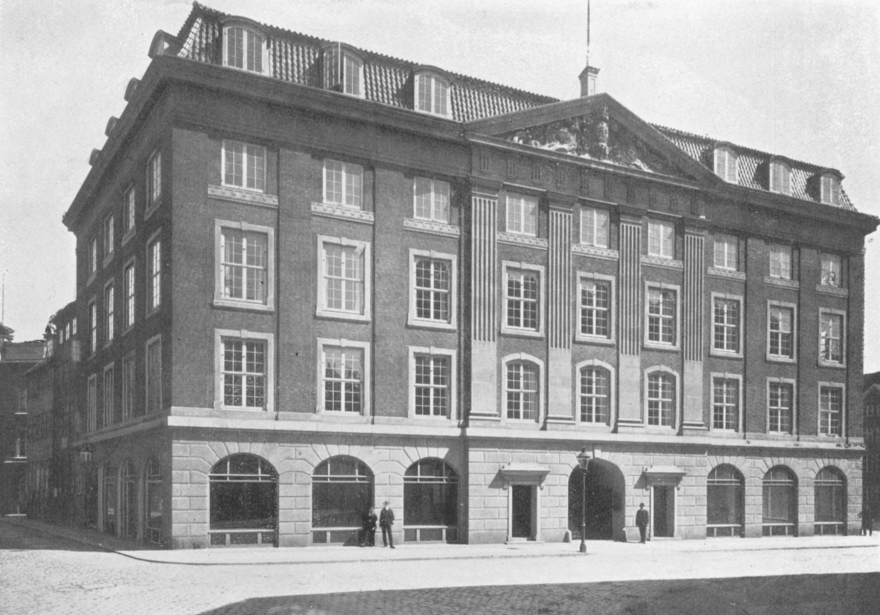
Kejsergade 2 in Copenhagen

Hasselbalch died in on 6 August 1925 and is buried at Vestre Cemetery in Copenhagen. After his death, his company, Hasselbalch & Co. (Dansk Gardin- og Textil-Fabrik and Dansk Farveri- og Merceriserings-Anstalt) was passed on to his son Hugo Helms Hasselbalch (1888–1957). He was also CEO of the companies AB Svenska Gardinfabriken in Gothenburg and A/S Norsk Gardinfabrik in Halden. In 1955, the company was floated on the stock exchange. The curtain factory closed in 1962.

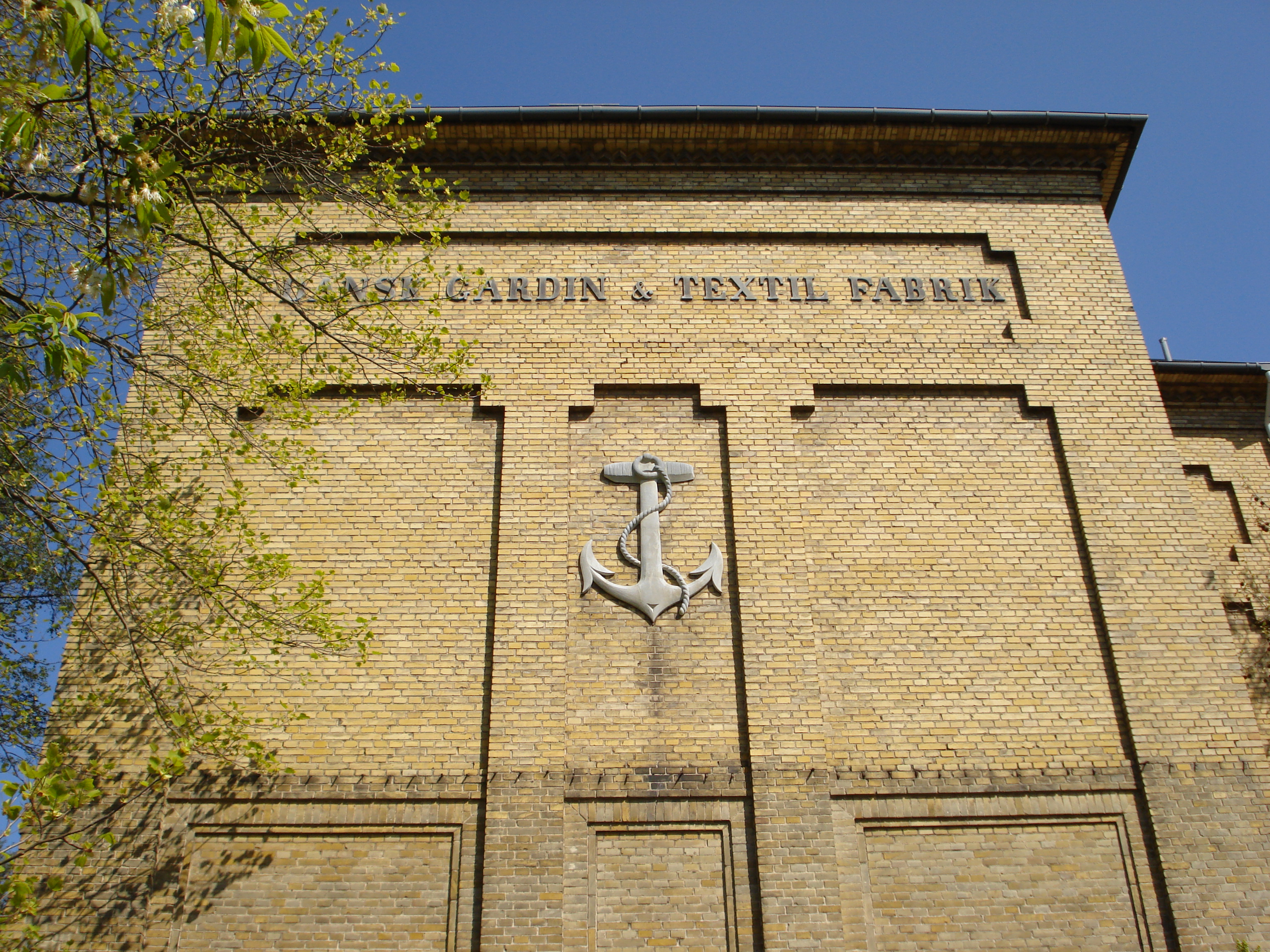
The former curtain factory in Kongens Lyngby

The former head office of Hasselbalch's company is located at Kejsergade 2 in Copenhagen. The building is from 1904–1905 and was designed by Valdemar Ingemann. The curtain factory's former buildings in Kongens Lyngby are located at Gammel Lundtoftegade. The complex dates from 1898 and is built in yellow brick. It was designed by Bernhard Ingemann. Lyngby Søndre Mølle's current building was built for the curtain factory by Valdemar Ingemann following a fire in 1902. The housing development for workers at the factory is today known as Hyldehaverne. Hasselbalch's former home is located at Kristianiagade 3. The house was built in 1897–1898 according to design by Kristoffer Varming. The house is now part of the Russian Embassy. Hasselbalch's summer residence in Tungsted, villa Piniehøj, has been demolished. It was from 1899 and also designed by Varming.
