= Strandbjerg =

Building in Rudersdal Municipality, Denmark

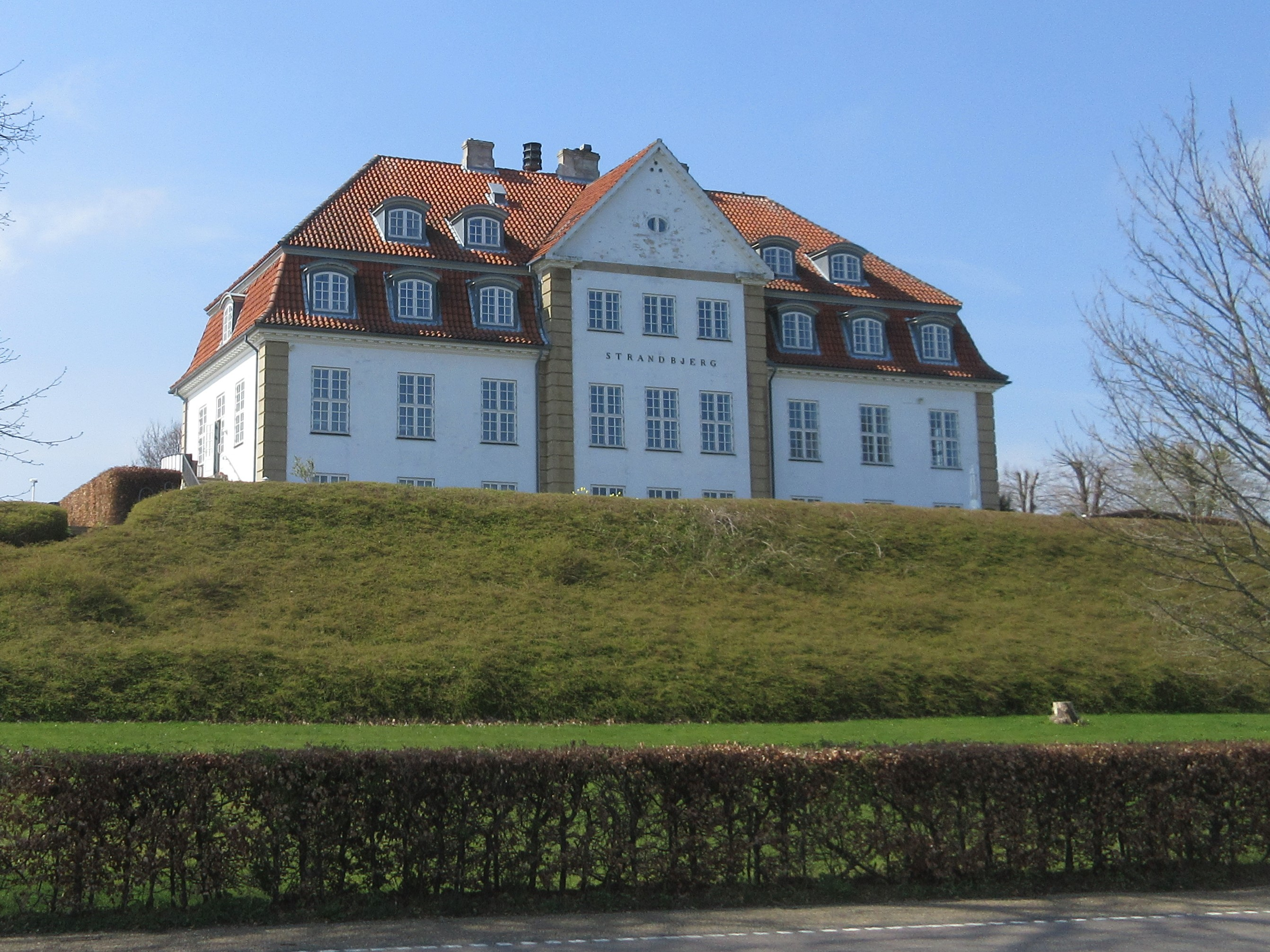
- Interactive map of the Strandbjerg area

General information
- Location: Rungsted, Rudersdal Municipality, Strandbjerg 1, 2960 Rungsted Kyst, Denmark
- Coordinates: 55°53′32.17″N 12°32′15.68″E
- Construction started: 1918

Design and construction
- Architect: Bernhard Ingemann

Strandbjerg, also known as Villa Standbjerg, is a mansion in Rungsted, Hørsholm Municipality, situated on the Øresund coast north of Copenhagen, Denmark. The building was confiscated by the Gestapo during World War II.

== History ==
=== Origins ===
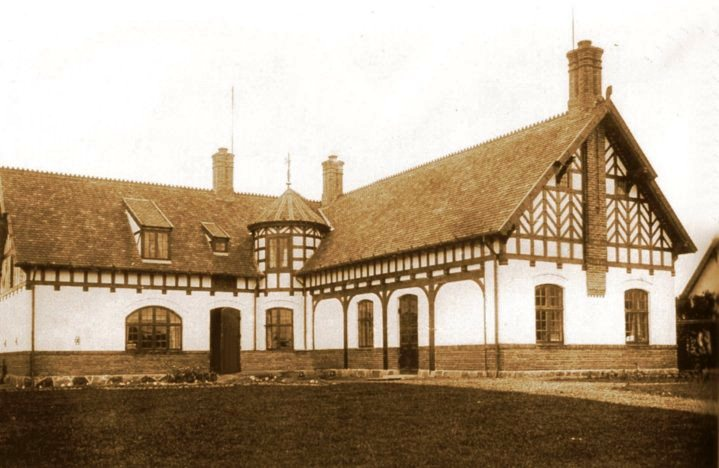
The old Strandbjerg, 1903

Strandbjerg's history as a country house dates back to the first half of the 19th century. It is believed that it may have been the direct inspiration for the fictional country house of the same name in Jens Christian Hostrup's 1847 play Eventyr op Fodrejsen (Tale of a Journey on Foot). Hostrup stayed at nearby Kokkedal when he wrote the play.

It belonged to the businessman Carl Ruben from 1898 to 1912. A new house was possibly built for him to designs by Carl Brummer in around 1902.

=== Levin and the new building ===
In 1915, Strandbjerg was acquired by lawyer Carl Levin and his wife Anna Levin (née Ferslew). Anna Levin was the daughter of Jean Christian Ferslew. Together with her brother Christian, she owned C. F. Jean Ferslew & Co. Her husband served as CEO of the company. In 1916. Levin charged the architect Bernhard Ingemann with the design of a new mansion for the site. Ingemann had already designed the country house Strandtofte for businessman Franz Nordstrand a little down the road (Rungsted Strandvej 77, 1912–1. He was also charged with the design of the new Hørsholm City Hall (1918). The new house was completed in 1918. The old house was used as residence for his gardener and referred to as Clermont.

=== Later history ===
In 1922, Villa Strandbjerg was acquired by hofjægermester Aage Krabbe (1862-1933). His widow Ellen Frederikke Hartnack (1864-1940) owned Strandbjerg until at least 1937.

During World War II, Strandbjerg was confiscated by the Gestapo. Mearby Tungsted Beach Hotel and Cilla Sol were also used by the Gestapo. The building's basement was used as prison cells.

In 1948, Villa Strandbjerg was taken over by Copenhagen Municipality. On 1 June 1948, it opened as an asylum for 42 ill women. It closed in 1990. In 1993, it was acquired by PFA. The main building was subsequently converted into apartments. The surrounding park was built over with additional apartment buildings.

== Architecture ==
The facade is dominated by a three-bay median risalit tipped by a triangular pediment. The edges of the median risalit and the corners of the building are accented with lesenes.
