= Lyngby Søndre Mølle =

Watermill in Kongens Lyngby, Denmark

Coordinates: 55.7738°N 12.4987°E

Lyngby Southern Watermill
- Lyngby Søndre Mølle
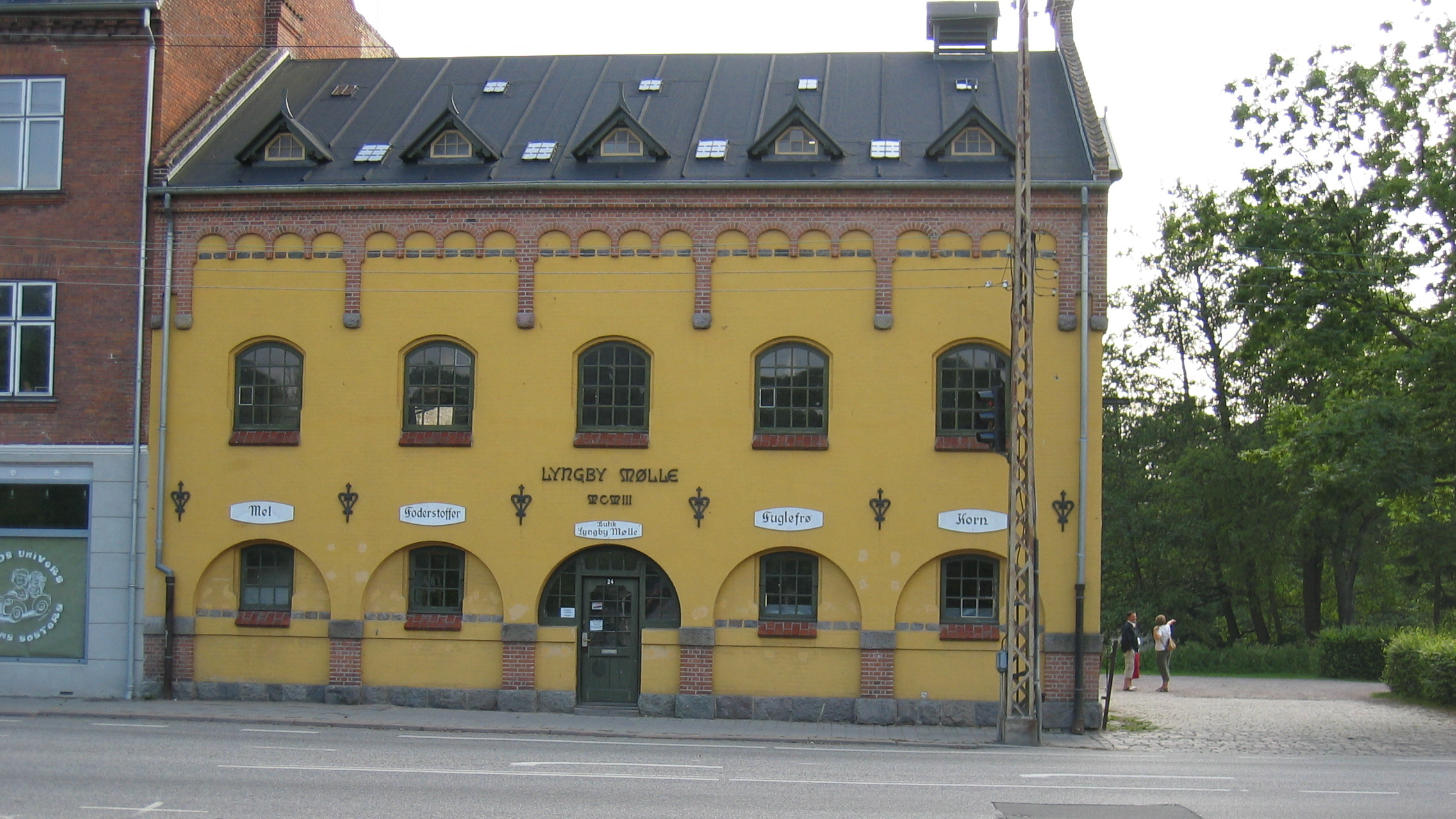
- Interactive map of the Lyngby Southern Watermill area

General information
- Architectural style: National Romantic
- Location: Kongens Lyngby, Copenhagen, Denmark, Denmark
- Completed: 1902

Design and construction
- Architect: Valdemar Ingemann

Lyngby Søndre Mølle, literally Lyngby Southern Mill, is a defunct watermill on Mølleåen located at Lyngby Hovedgade, Kongens Lyngby, in the northern suburbs of Copenhagen, Denmark. The current building is from 1902. The name distinguishes it from nearby Lyngby Nordre Mølle.

== History ==
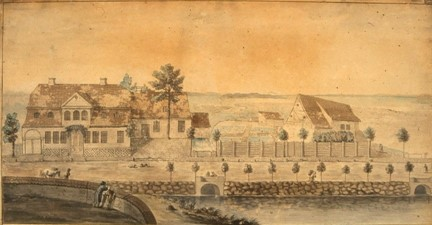
The two watermills with Lyngby Kongevej in the foreground in 1792

A watermill in Lyngby is first mentioned in 1492 and was then owned by the crown, although it may be several hundred years older. In the 17th and 18th century, it was used both as a rolling mill and as a paper mill.

It became known as Lyngby Søndre Mølle after a second water mill was built a little further to the north in circa 1762. Both watermills are seen on a map of the mew royal road to Frederiksborg Castle from 1765. The watermill was acquired by Christian Hasselbalch who opened a curtain factory at an adjacent site in 1892. The watermill was completely destroyed in a fire in 1902. A new watermill powered by a water turbine was the following year built at the site for the curtain factory to design by Valdemar Ingemann. The building was acquired by Lyngby-Taarbæk Municipality in 1965. It was for a while leased by Svandholm and operated as a grain mill.

== Today ==
The building is located at Lyngby Hovedgade 24. It is now home to an organic store. The shop was formerly operated by Svanholm Manor.
