= Baldersbæk =

Historic townhouse in Copenhagen, Denmark

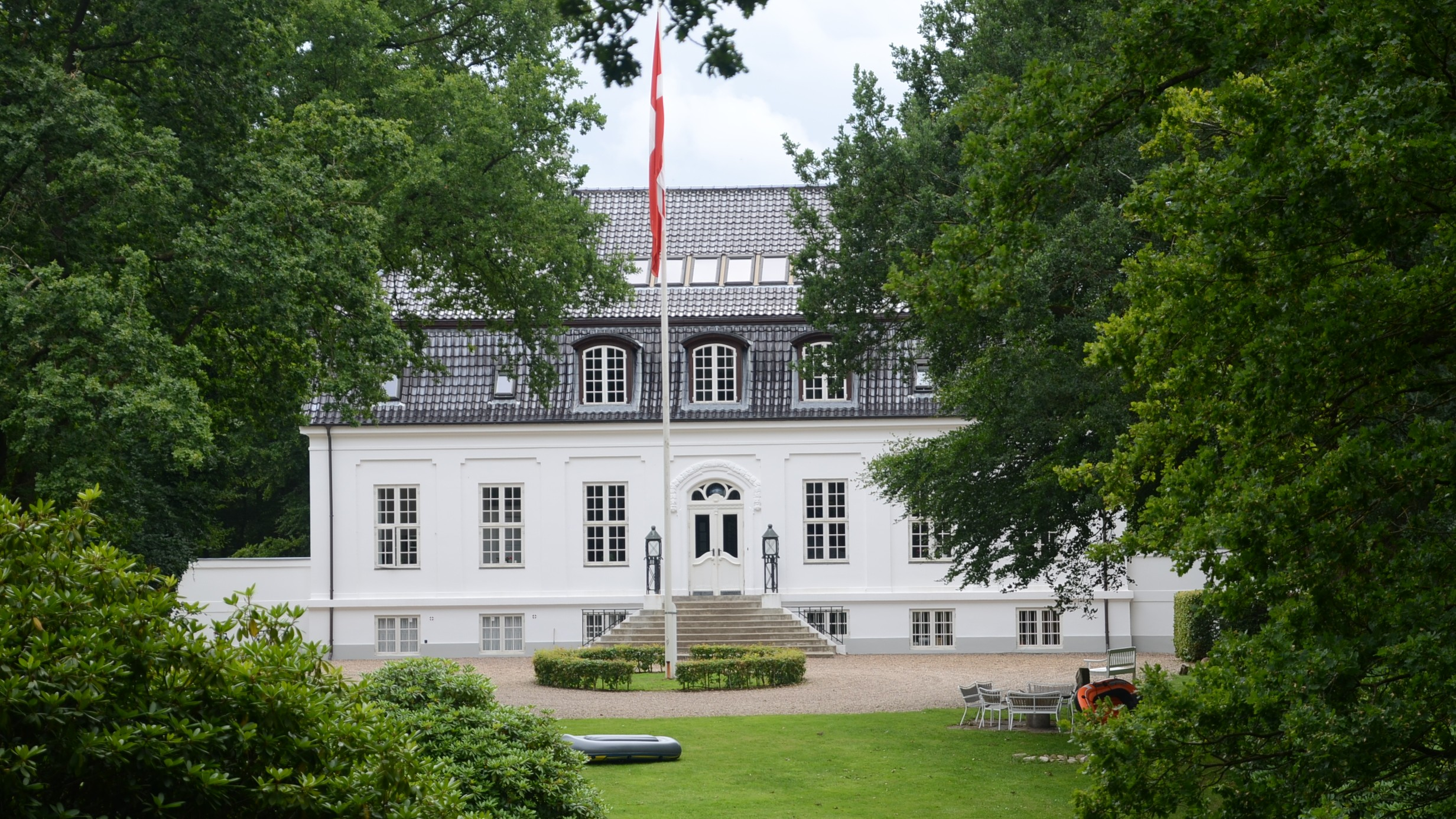

General information
- Location: Vejen Municipality, Denmark
- Coordinates: 55.62510°N 8.90542°E
- Completed: 1910
- Client: Holger Petersen

Baldersbæk is a house and forest estate 25 km northwest of Vejen, Denmark. Planted by Holger Petersen in the 1890s, Baldersbæk Plantation is the largest of the so-called "Copenhagener Plantations" (Danish: Københavnerplantager). The plantations were created in the years around 1900 by wealthy Copenhageners to promote soil melioration in Western Jutland. Villa Baldersbæk was constructed for him in 1910. The adjacent park features a number of monuments by Anders Bundgaard as well as other features. The estate is now owned by the Holger Petersen Foundation. The park is open to the public.

== History ==
In 1880, Holger Petersen co-founded Plantningsselskabet Staushede. In 1891, he bought an old farm and planted the Baldersbæk plantation, which was more than 500 hectares (1,200 acres). In 1895, he also purchased Hølund in partnership with Christian Dalgas. On a journey to the area in 1892, he also convinced other wealthy businessmen to invest in plantations. He became a board member of Hedeselskabet in 1907 and was its vice chairman from 1910.

In 1910, Petersen constructed a country house on the Baldersbæk estate. He also commissioned the sculptor Anders Bundgaard to design a number of sandstone monuments for the park.

After Holger Petersen's death, Baldersbæk was passed to the Holger Petersen Foundation. In 2013–14, Baldersbæk's park was refurbished with funding from Realdania.

== House and park ==
Villa Baldersbæk was constructed to designs by Bernhard and Valdemar Ingemann with inspiration from Frederiksdal House.

The park was designed by the landscape architect Erstad-Jørgensen. Features comprised a carp pond, winding paths, cottages, monuments and fountains.

Anders Bundgaard's sandstone monuments include a statue of Holger Petersen and the Three-Hundreds-Stone. The three-metre-tall Three-Hundreds-Stone from 1912 stands at the spot where the three historical hundreds of laugs, Malt and Skads meet. The three men depicted on the stone are Hedeselskabet-founder Enrico Dalgas, innkeeper in Hovborg J. K. Sørensen and chief forester J. C. Sørensen. They all made significant contributions to the planting of the heaths around Hovborg.

Other features include some of the original sandstone sculptures from Børsen in Copenhagen. Petersen sponsored a renovation of the building and was given some of the ornaments that were renewed.

== Gallery ==
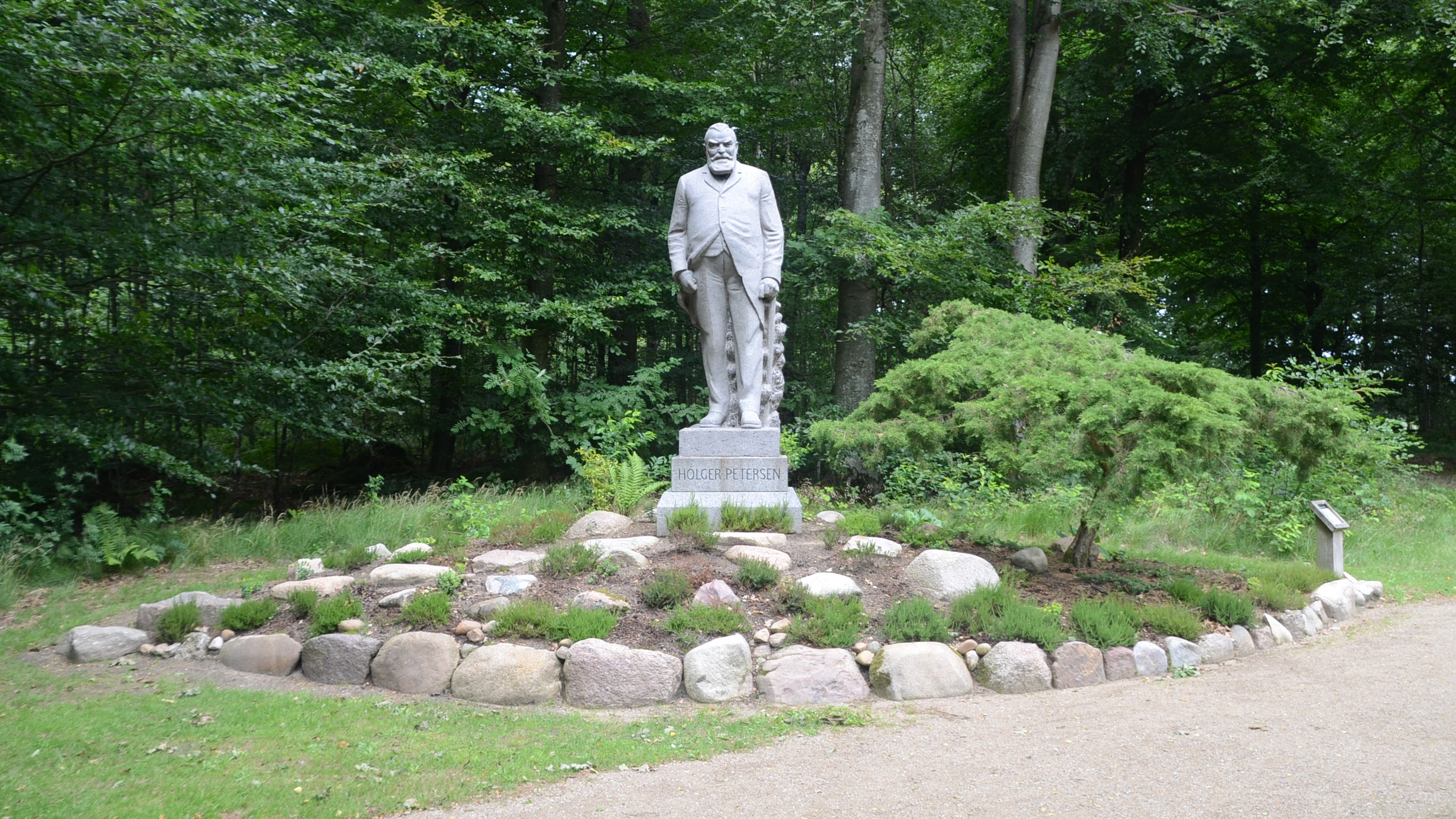
Holger Petersen statue

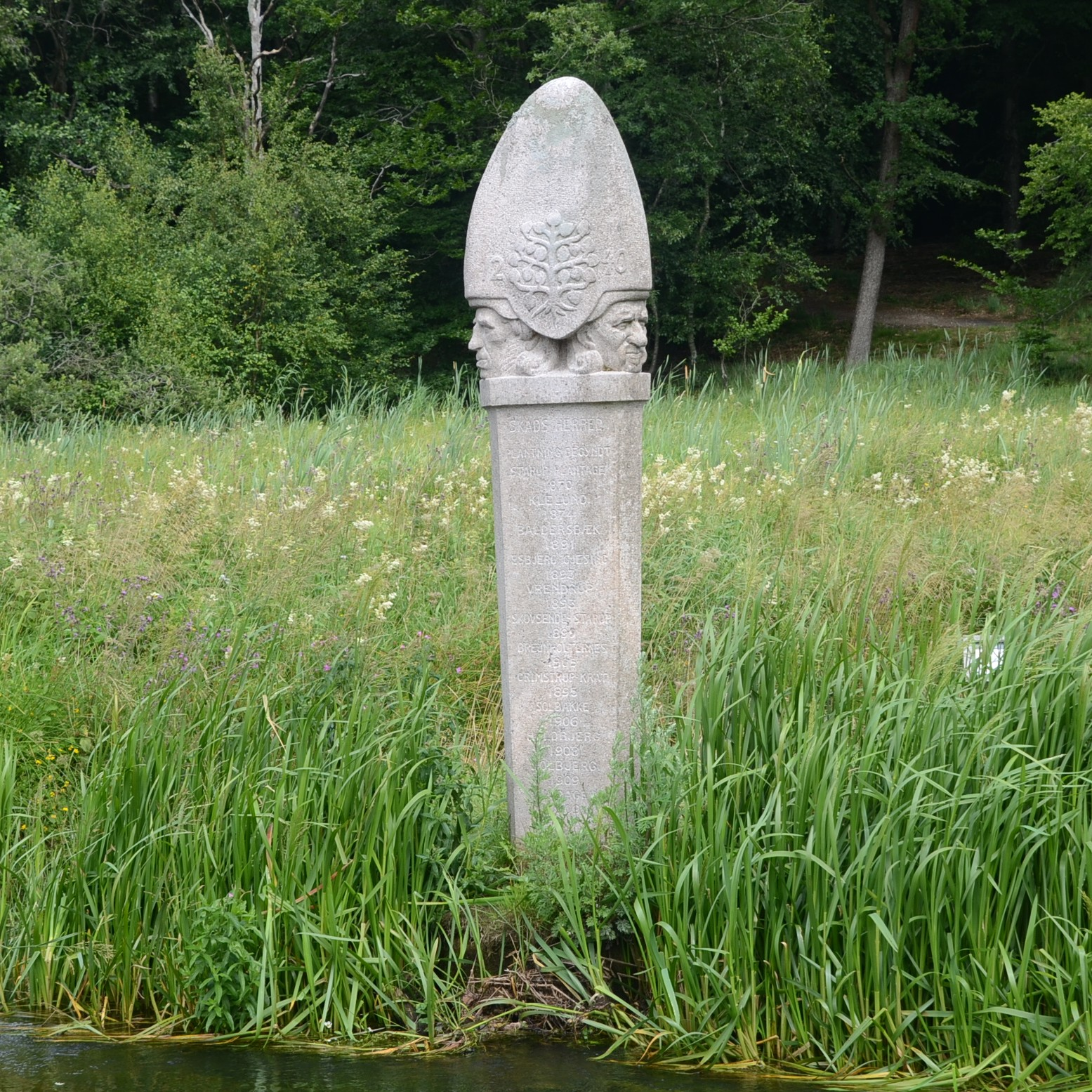
The Three-Hundreds-Stone

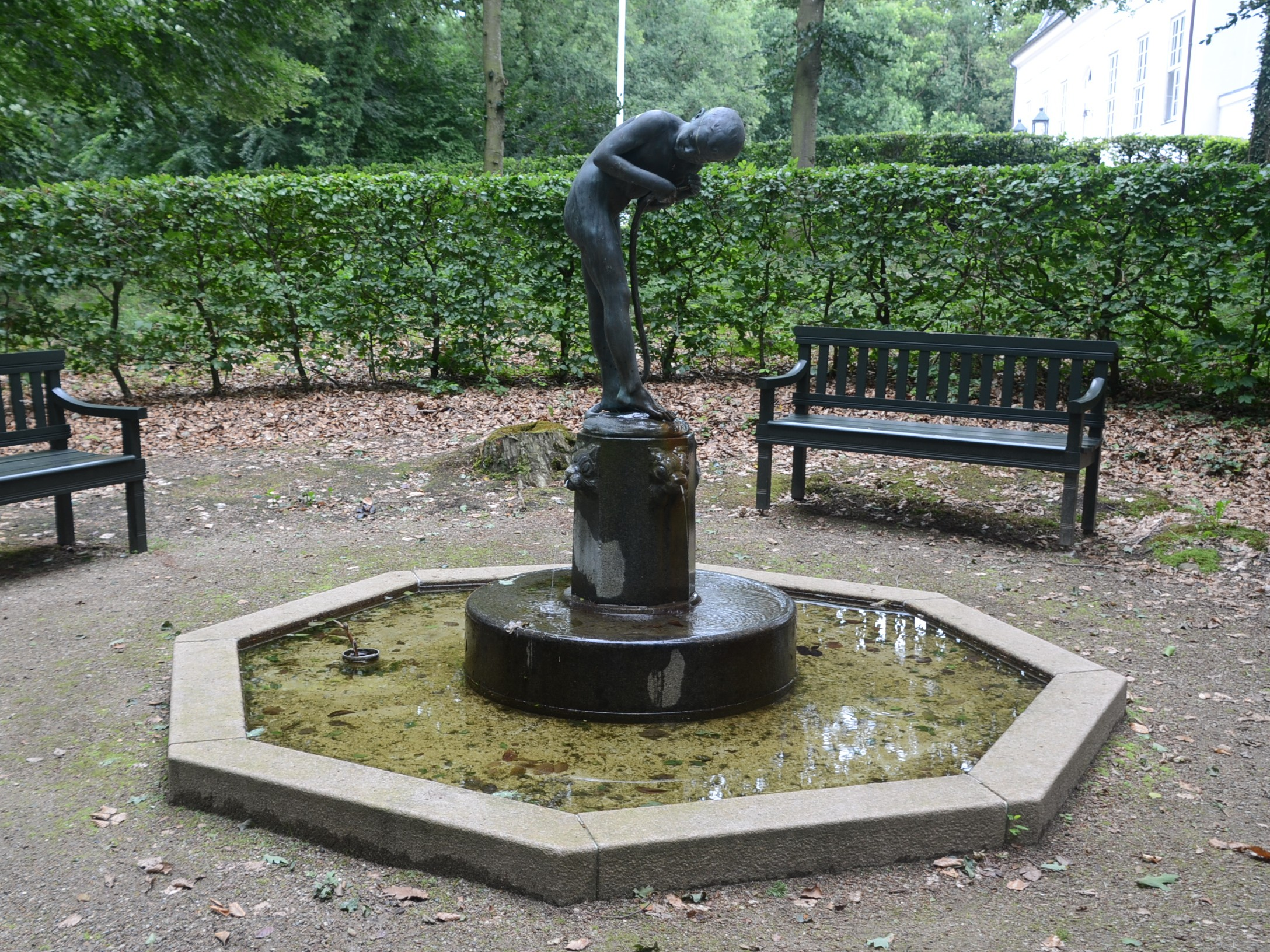
Fountain

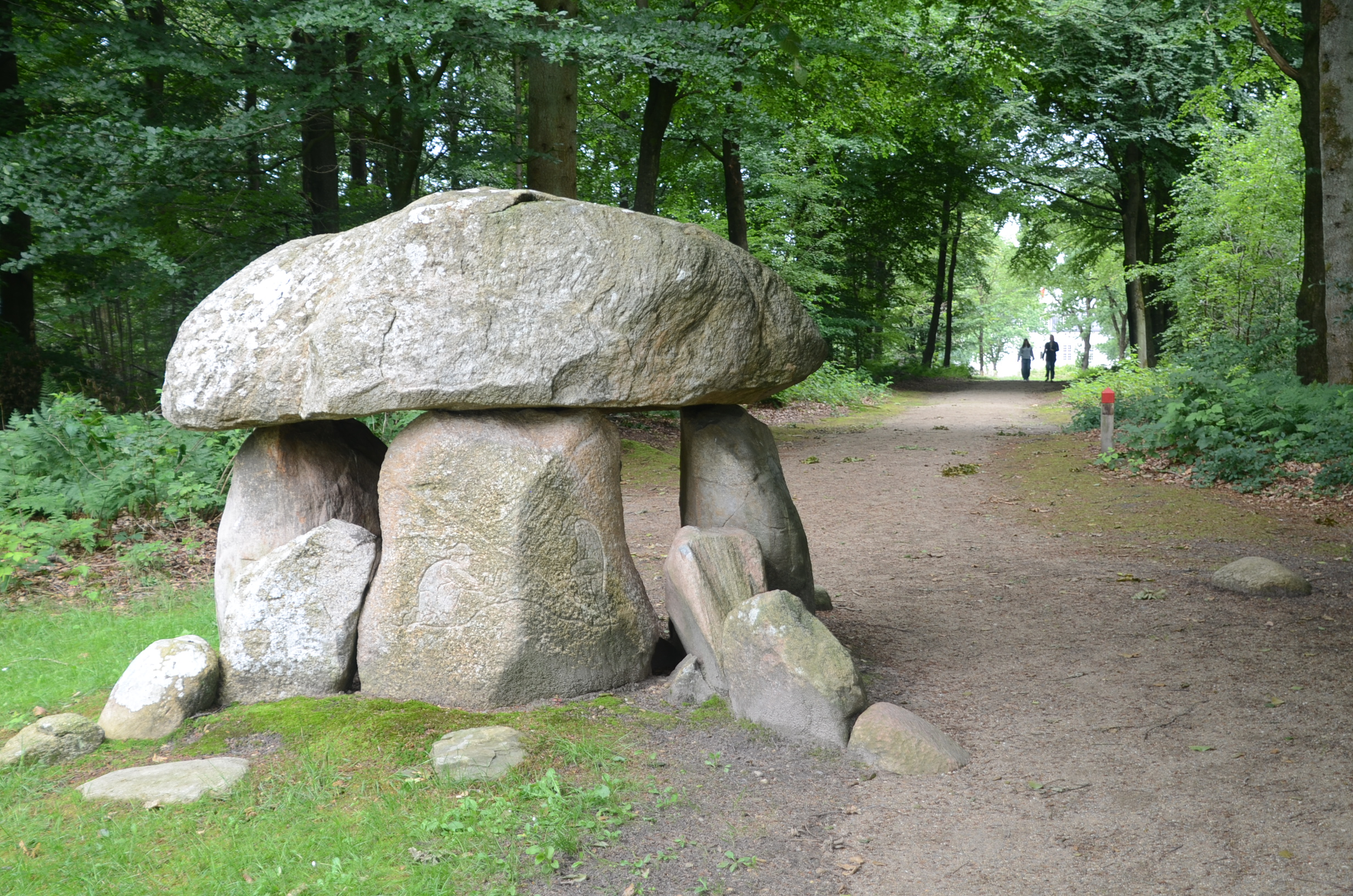

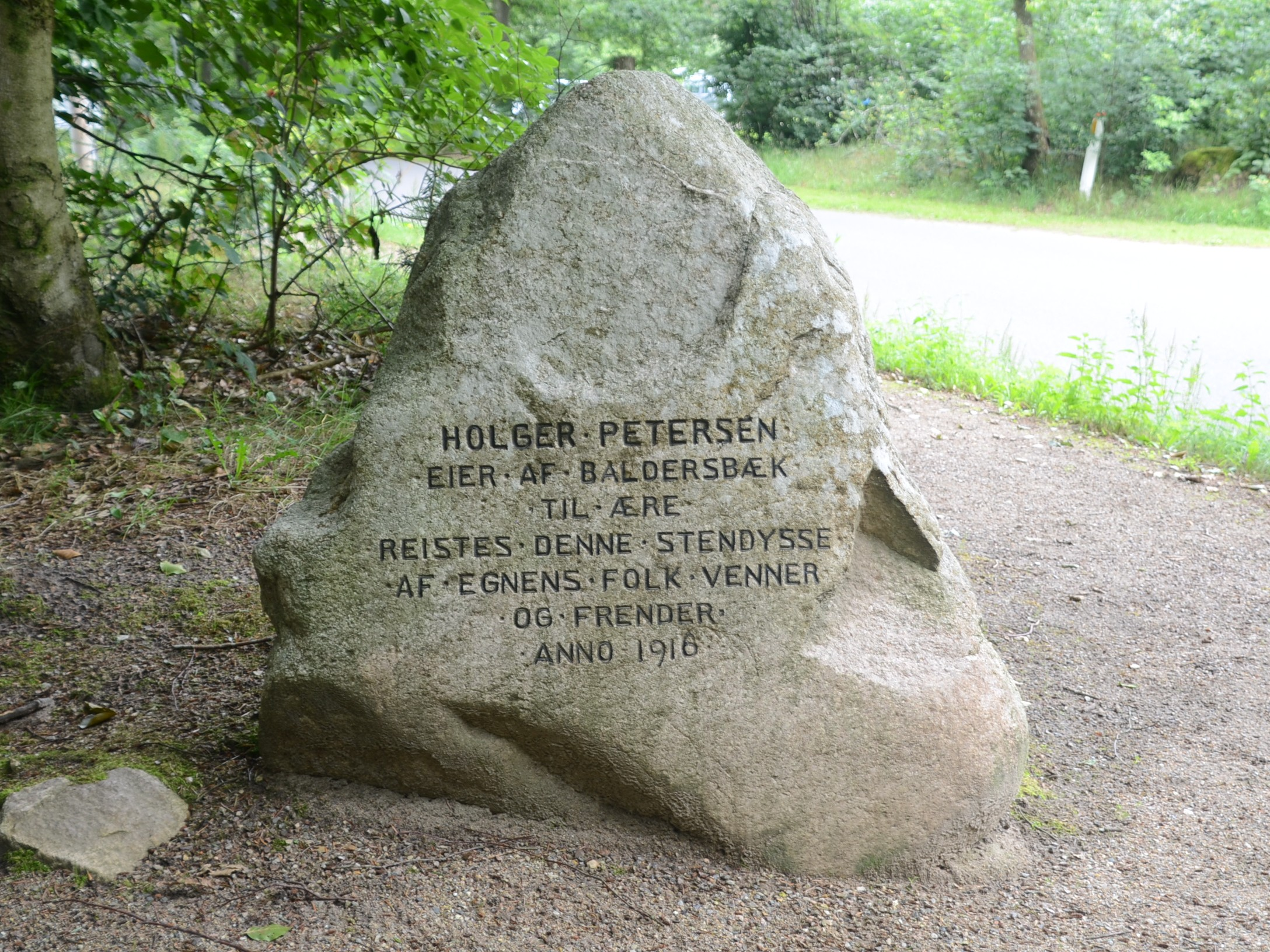
