= Torvegade 28 =

Listed building in Copenhagen

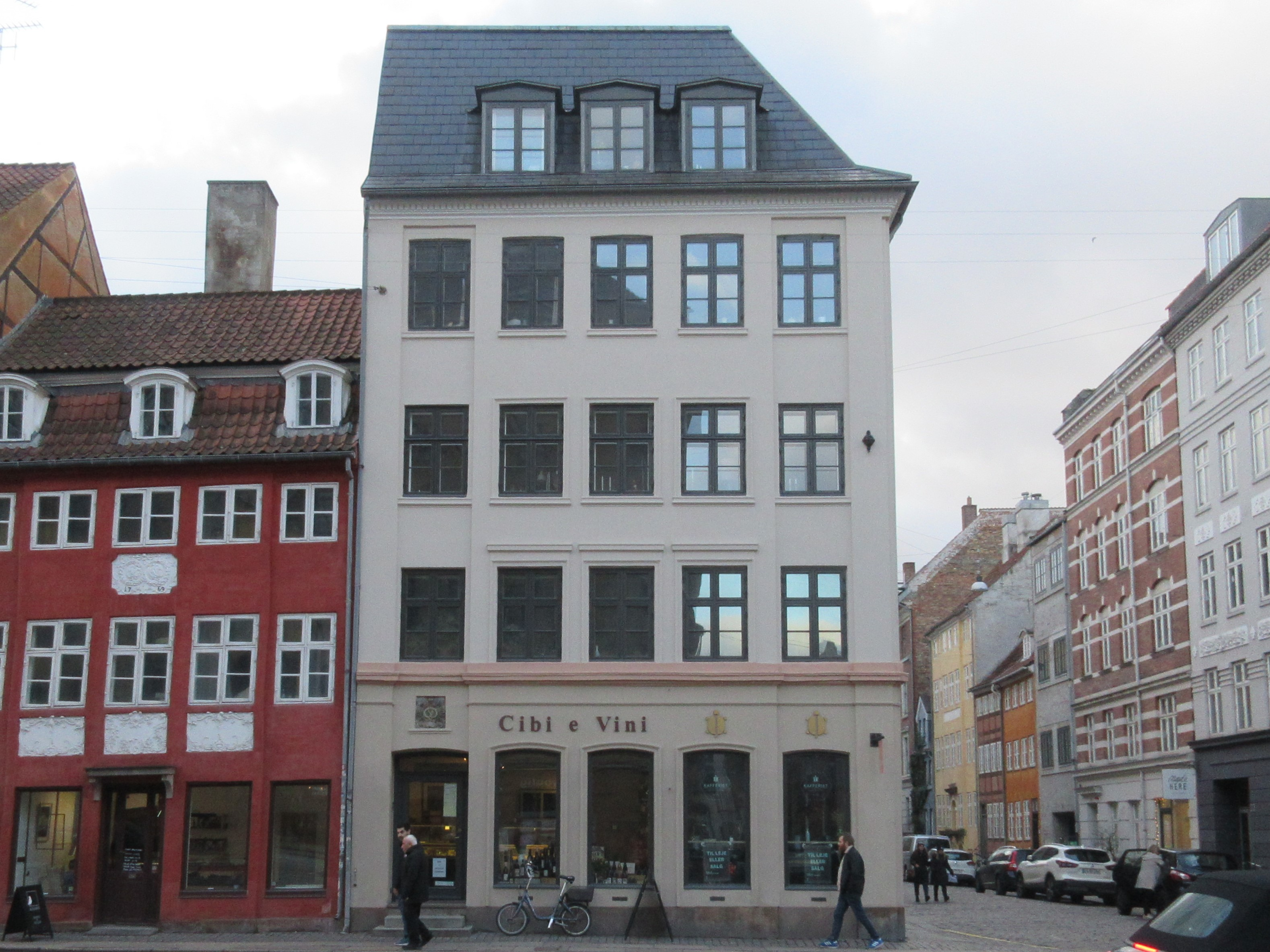
- Interactive map of the Torvegade 28 area

General information
- Location: Copenhagen, Denmark
- Coordinates: 55°40′22.55″N 12°35′23.32″E
- Completed: c. 1740
- Renovated: 1852 (heightened), 1900s

Torvegade 28/Wildersgade 26 is an 18th-century building complex situated on the corner of Torvegade and Wildersgade in the Christianshavn neighborhood of central Copenhagen, Denmark. It consists of a four-storey corner building and an adjacent three-storey former warehouse in Wildersgade (No. 26A). The two buildings were both heightened with one storey in 1852. The property was for almost two hundred years—from 1727 until 1917—owned by bakers. Their bakery was located in a side wing. A sandstone tablet with a relief of a crowned kringle and a cartouche with the initials of a former owner and the date "Anno 1770" can still be seen above the shop entrance in Torvegade. The entire complex was listed in the Danish registry of protected buildings and places in 1982.

== History ==
=== 18th century ===
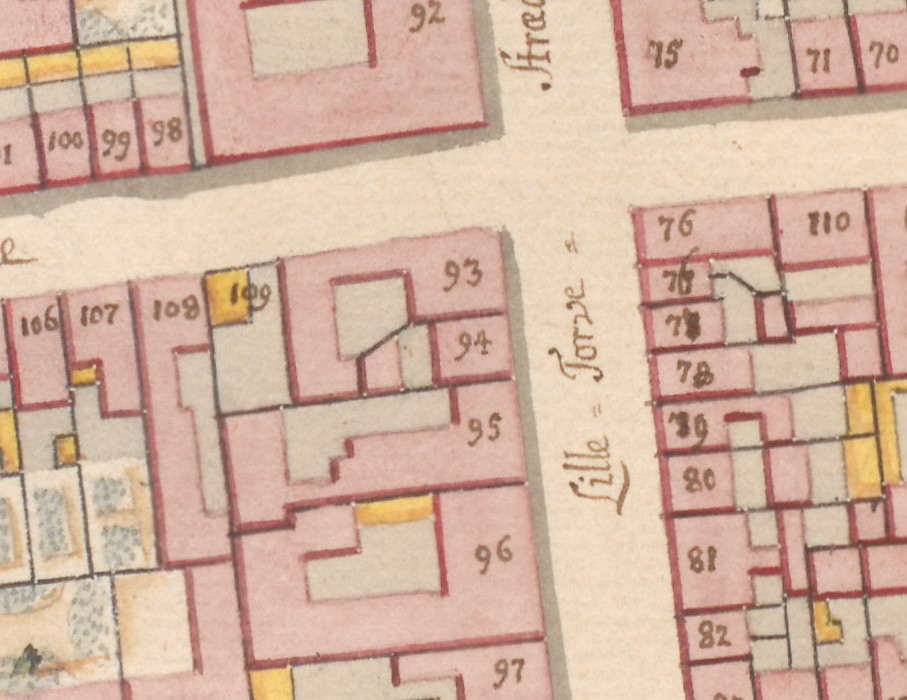
No. 93 seen in a detail from Christian Gedde's map of Christianshavn Quarter, 1757

The site was made up of two smaller properties in the late 17th century. One of them was listed as No. 54 in Copenhagen's first cadastre of 1689 and was at that time owned by Johan Christensen. The other one was listed as No. 73 and was owned by butcher Anders Kølmer. They were later merged into a single property. The property was owned by bakers from 1727. A seven-bays-long timber-framed building was replaced by a three-storey building some time between 1735 and 1743. The building was constructed in brick towards the two streets and with timber framing towards the central courtyard. The facade towards Wildersgade (then Lille Kongensgade) was crowned by a gabled wall dormer with a pulley. There was a basement towards the yard but not towards the street. The property was listed as No. 93 in the new cadastre of 1856 and was at that time owned by baker Christian Holst.

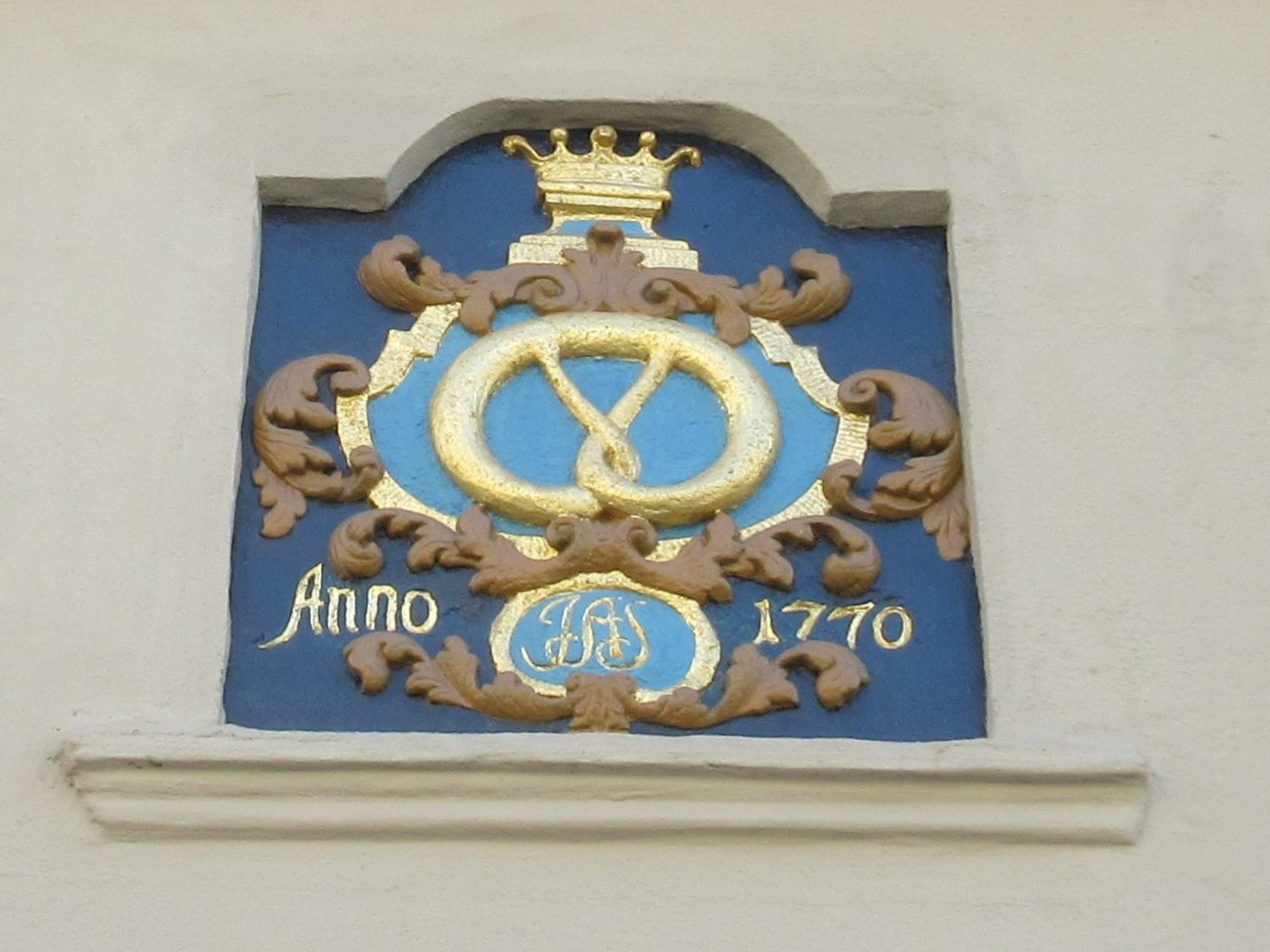
A stone tablet with a crowned kringle, Sørensen's initials and the date "Anno 1770" seen above the door in Torvegade

The property was acquired by baker Johan Albrecht Sørensen in 1770. As of the 1787 census, he lived there with his wife Bodel Catharina, their son (aged 14) and three daughters (aged two to nine), one maid, one wet nurse and three bakers. His bakery was located in a side wing. A two-storey warehouse was constructed next to the corner building in Wildersgade some time between 1672 and 1791. It replaced a combined carriage house and horse stable.

=== 19th century ===
The property was later acquired by baker Johan Fohrmann. His property was home to 12 residents in two households at the time of the 1801 census. The just 32-year-old owner resided in the building with his wife Bodel Catharina, their three daughters (aged two to nine), one maid, one wet nurse and three bakers. Søren Truelsen, a former brewer and distiller, resided in the building with his wife Kirstine Hansen. Truelsen had previously been the owner of a distiller at the corner of Sankt Annæ Gade and Overgaden Neden Vandet.

The property was listed as No. 123 in the new cadastre of 1806. It was at that time still owned by Fohrmann.

The property was home to 17 residents in two households at the time of the 1840 census. Ernst Brockmeyer, a new master baker, resided in the building with his wife Sophie Behnecke, their four children (aged one to 16), three bakers, one baker's apprentice, one male servant and three maids. The eldest son was also a baker's apprentice. Dorte Behnecke (née Dahl), Sophie Brockmeyer's mother and herself widow of a master baker (possibly the previous owner), resided on the first floor with an 11-year-old granddaughter and one maid.

Ernst Brockmeyer is mentioned as a member of Tryjjefrihedsselskabet in 1836. In 1846–48, he succeeded E. Benthin as alderman of the Bakers' Gild in Copenhagen.

The property was still owned by Brockmeyer in 1850. The building was two years later heightened to four storeys.

The property was later passed to Brockmeyer's son Gustav Brochmeyer. His property was home to 23 residents at the time of the 1860 census. Gustav resided in the building with his wife Maria (née Als), his 21-year-old sister, a housekeeper, one maid, four bakers and one caretaker. Svend Svendsen West, a royal machinist, resided on the first floor with his two children (aged four and seven) and one maid. Christian Ludwig Peter Fog, a clerk, resided on the third floor with his wife Eduardine Marie Elisabeth Fog (née Voit), their three children (aged 10 to 14) and one maid. Anna Magretha Andersen (née Jensen), a widow needleworker, resided on the fourth floor with her 22-year-old daughter.

The Cpåenhagen Telephone Company (Kjøbenhavns Telefonselskab) rented the fourth floor in 1883. They installed a "house" and rack for the connection of telephone lines on the roof. The first shops with display windows were installed in the 1890s. The property remained in the ownership of a baker until 1917.

== Architecture ==
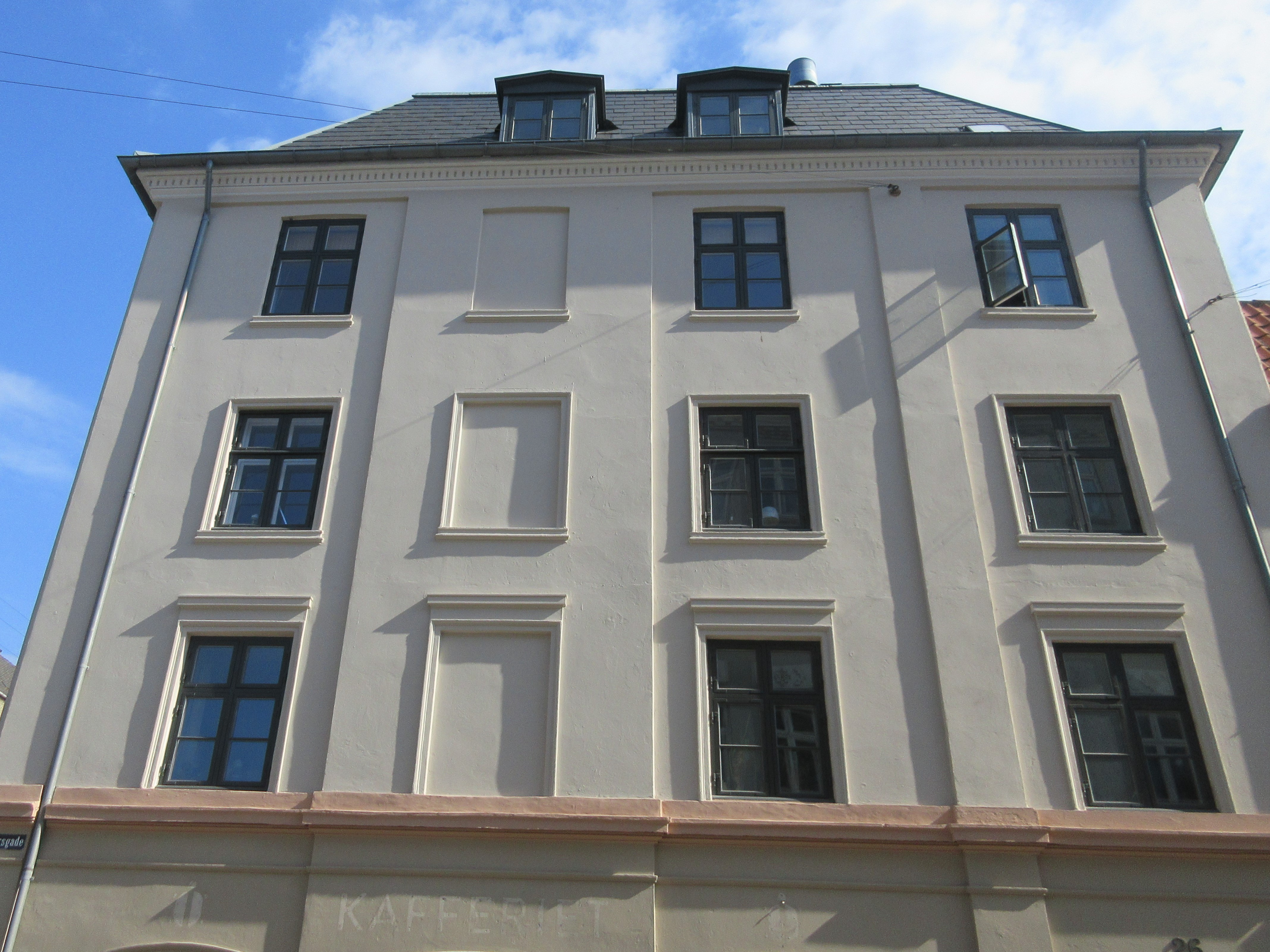
The corner building seen from Wildersgade

The four-storey corner building is constructed in brick on a foundation of granite ashlars with a five-bays-wide facade on Torvegade and a four-bays-wide facade on Eildersgade. The facade on Torvegade features a slightly projecting three-bay median risalit. The facade is towards both streets finished with a sandstone-coloured belt course above the ground floor and a dentillated cornice. It is decorated with lesenes on the three upper floors towards Wildersgade as well as at the corner in Torvegade. The first floor windows of the median risalit towards Torvegade and all four first floor windows towards Wildersgade are accented with hood moulds. The second window from the left on the three upper floors in Wildersgade have been bricked up. Above the shop entrance in Torvegade is a sandstone tablet with a relief of a crowned kringle and a cartouche with Johan Albrecht Sørensen's initials and the date "Anno 1770". The slate-clad mansard-like features three dormer windows towards Torvegade and two towards Wildersgade. The flat roof top was originally surrounded by a cast iron railing.

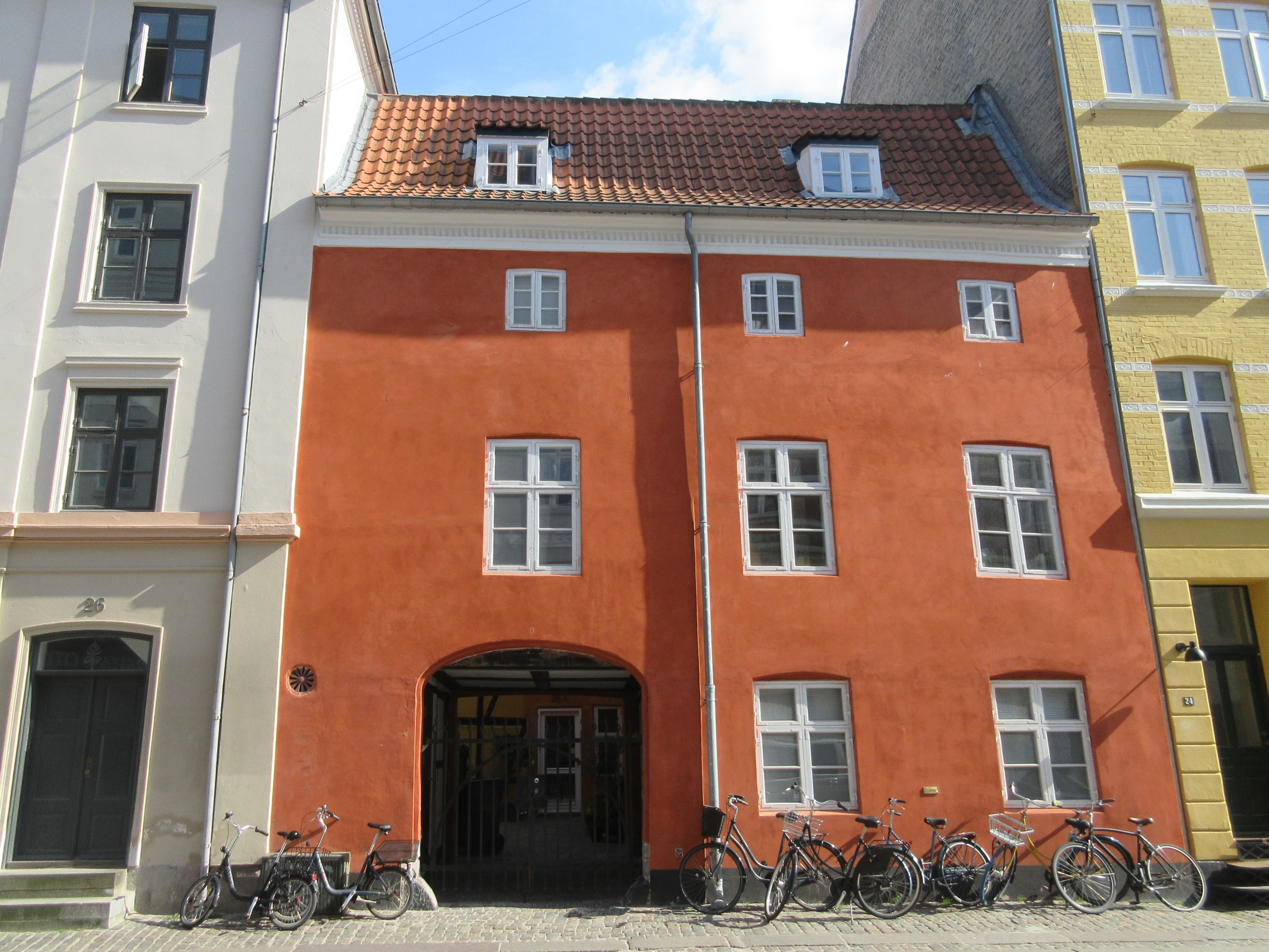
Wildersgade 26A

The red-painted former warehouse next to the corner building in Wildersgade is three storeys tall and three bays wide. The plastered facade is painted red with a white dentillated cornice and white-oainted windows. The red tile roof features two small dormer windows. A flat-arched gateway in the left-hand side of the building opens to the central courtyard. A four-bay side wing projects from the rear side of the building along the south side of the courtyard and is followed by a short rear wing. The side wing features two tall gabled wall dormers with pulley beams. All the facades towards the courtyard are plastered in an iron vitriol yellow colour. The rear side of the rear wing faces a larger courtyard shared by the adjacent buildings in Torvegade.

== Today ==
The property is owned by E/F Wildersgade 26 Og Torvegade 28. The two buildings were both refurbished in the late 1990s. The former warehouse was in this connection converted into two condominiums. The corner building contains two shops on the ground floor and a single condominium on each of the upper floors.

== Gallery ==
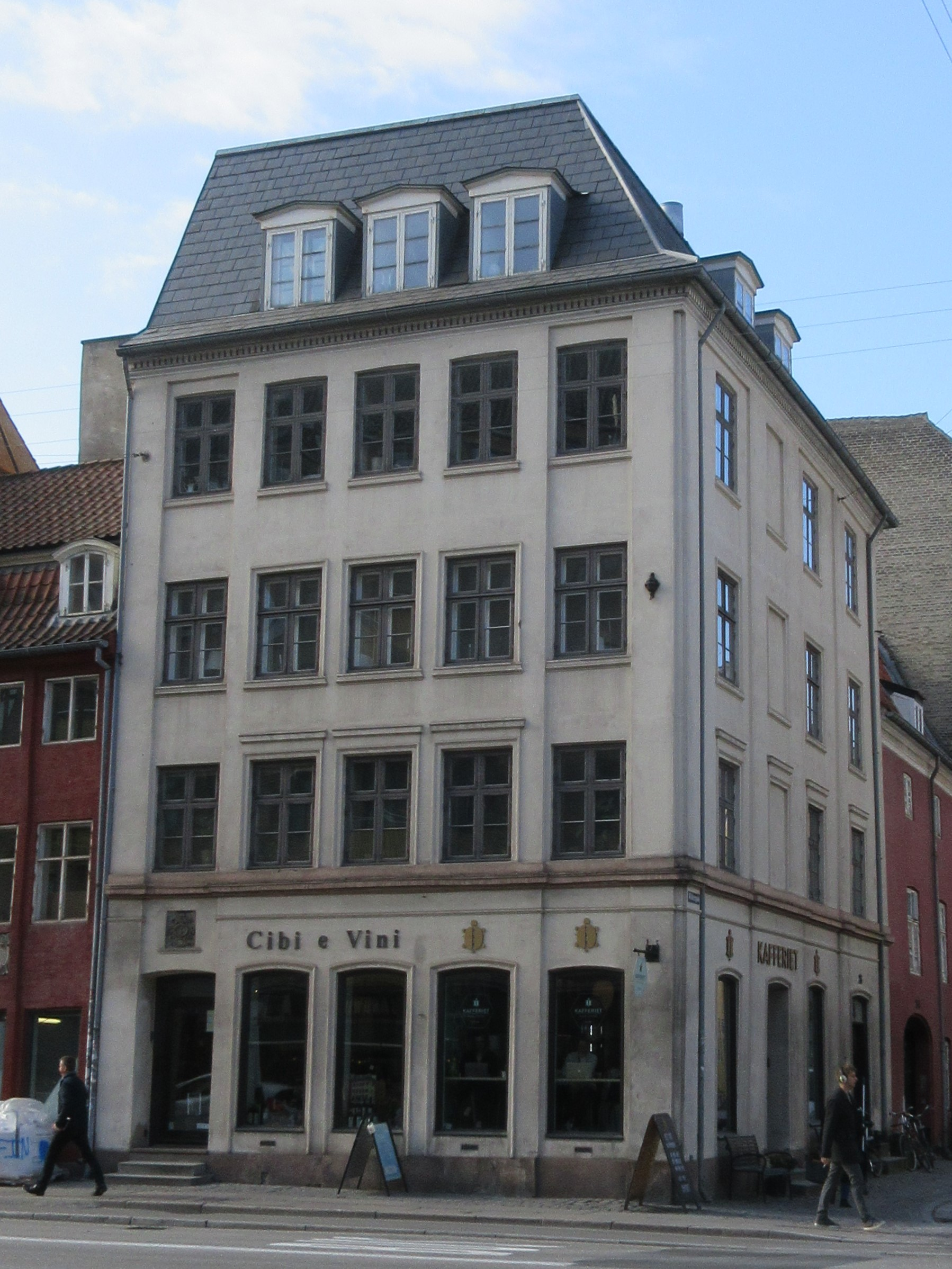
The property seen from the other side of Torvegade

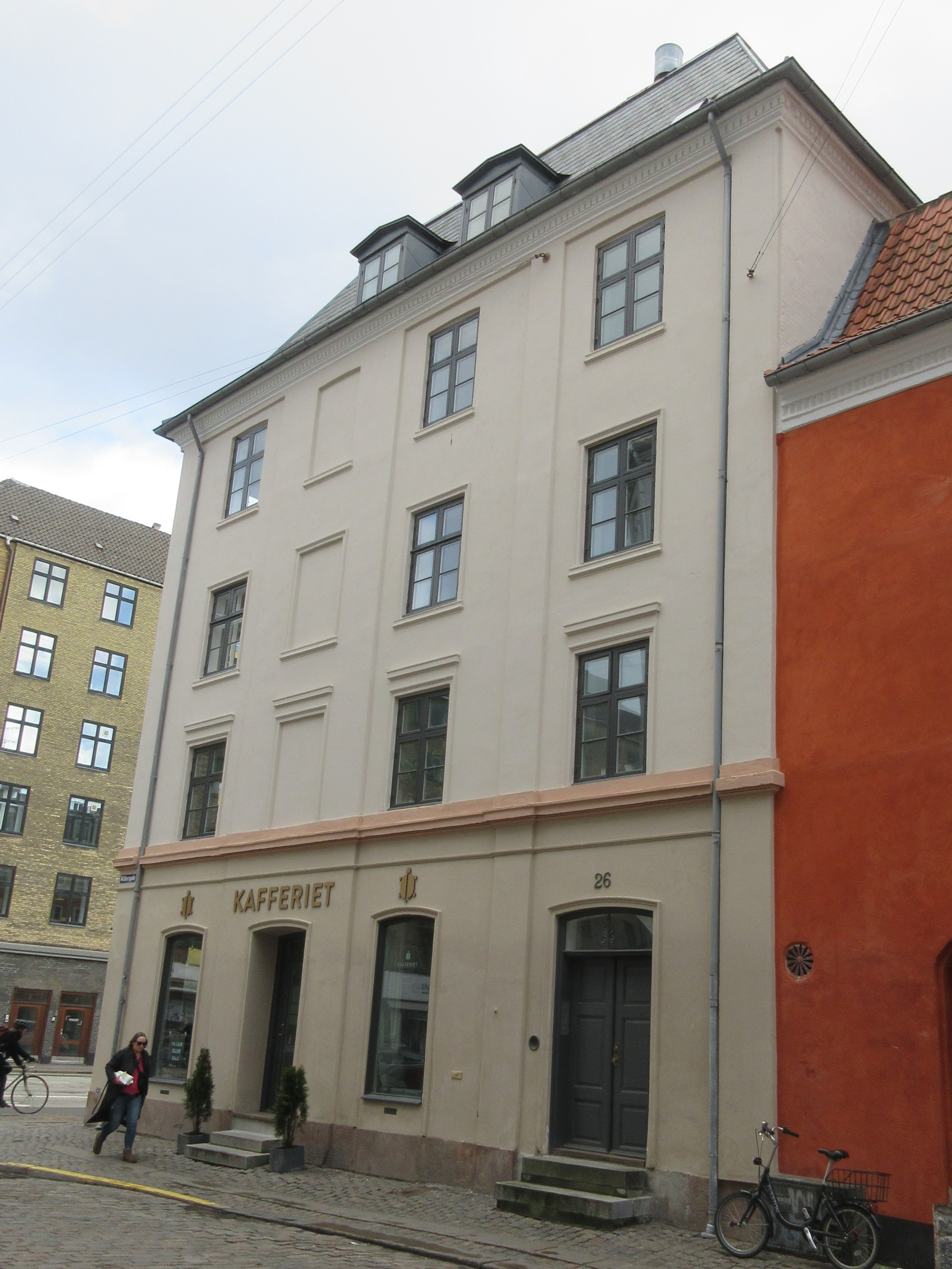
The property seen from Wildersgade

== See also ==
- Kringlegangen
