= Kringlegangen =

Building in Copenhagen

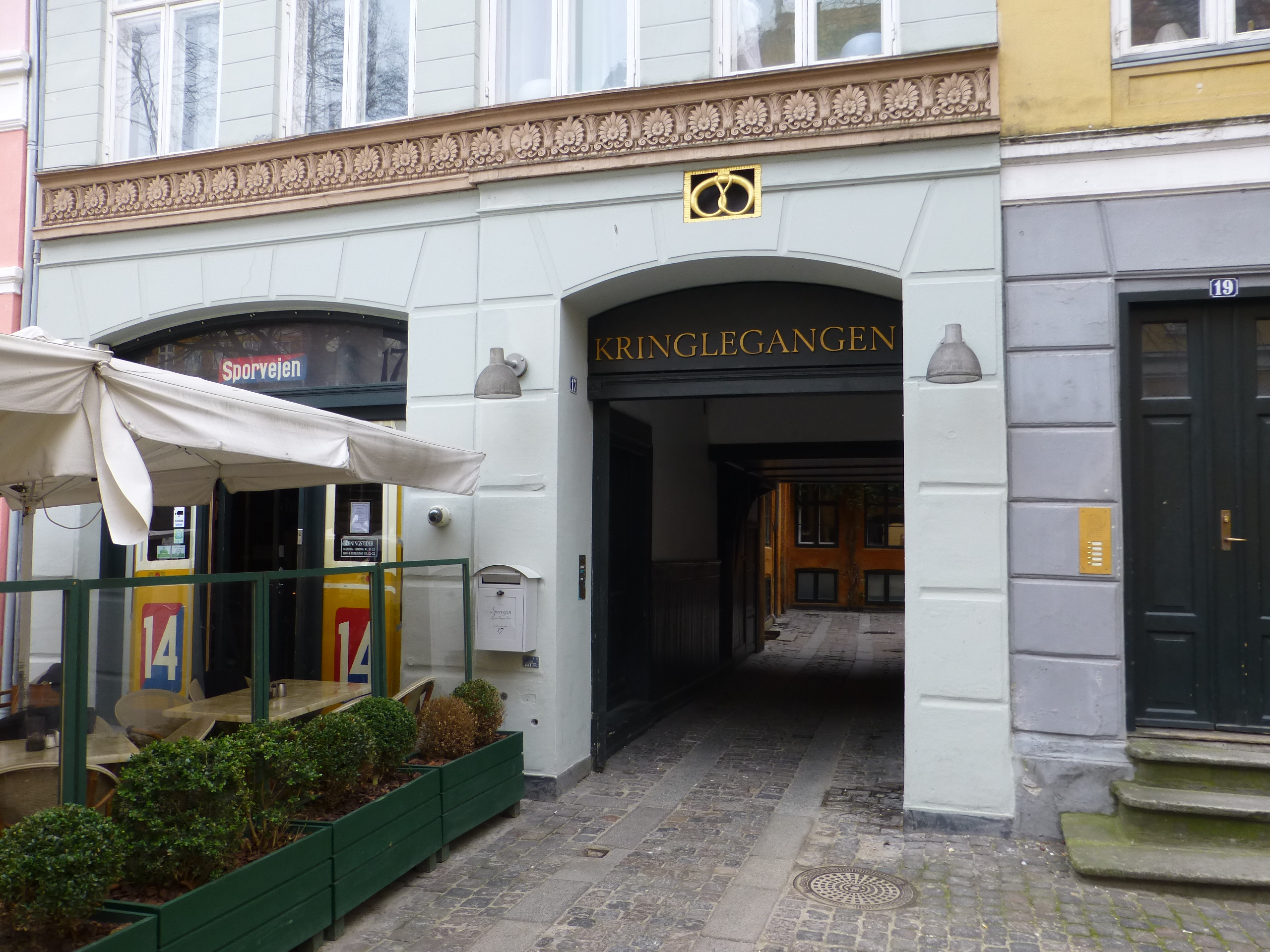
- Interactive map of the Kringlegangen area

General information
- Location: Copenhagen, Denmark
- Coordinates: 55°40′46.02″N 12°34′32.41″E
- Completed: 1858

Kringlegangen is a passageway linking the square Gråbrødretorv with the street Valkendorfsgade in the Old Town of Copenhagen, Denmark. A bakery was operated on the site from before 1787 until at least the 1910s. The present building complex (Gråbrødretorv 17/ Valkendorfsgade 32) was constructed in 1856-1857 for master joiner Carl Heinrich Winther. The passageway was not opened to the public until 1975. The name "Kringlegangen" was inspired by a gilded kringle above the entrance from Gråbrødretorv, as well as by the twisting and turning course of the passageway. The entire building complex was listed in the Danish registry of protected buildings and places in 1945.

== History ==
=== 18th century ===
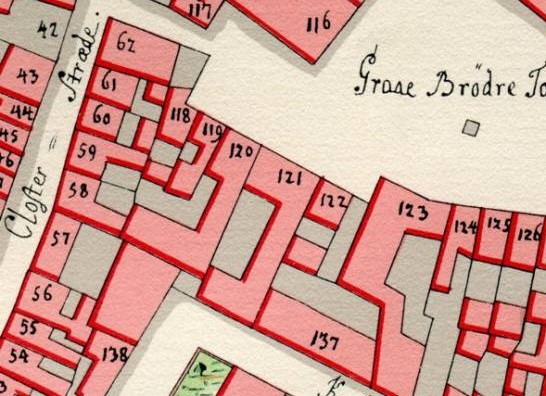
No. 120 seen in a detail from Christian Gedde's map of Frimand's Quarter, 1757

The property was listed as No. 130 in Frimand's Quarter in Copenhagen's first cadastre of 1689. It was at that time owned by joiner Johan Vals. The property was listed as No. 120 in the new cadastre of 1756 and was then owned by joiner Hans David Maÿns.

The property was later acquired by master baker Johan Scharin. At the time of the 1787 census, Scharin's property was home to a total of 45 residents in 12 households. Scharin resided in the building with his wife Antonette Lovise, their two daughters (aged seven and 10) and one maid. Paulus Blødel, a tailor, resided in the building with his wife Cesilia Sandel, their two sons (aged four and eight) and one maid. Maren Brunhold, a widow with a pension from the Danish Asiatic Company (52 skilling weekly), resided in the building with her sister Lene Brønlund. Hendrick Jochum Holst, a workman, resided in the building with his wife Dorthe Hedevig and their two-year-old son. Andreas Reigers, a widow, resided in the building with her two children (aged one and six) and one maid. Christopher Glerup, owner of Lundegaard, resided in the building with his niece Catrina Becker. Johan Andr. Weidemann, a workman, resided in the building with his wife Doreteaand one maid. Johan Morgenrød, another workman, resided in the building with his wife Ane Marie. Maren Sørens Datter, an 82-year-old woman, married but with no mention of her husband, resided in the building with one maid. Heiman Isaac, a 40-year-old Jewish man (no mention of profession), resided in the building with his wife Terza Melcher, their five children (aged one to 13) and one maid. Jobst Henrich, a master tailor, resided in the building with his wife Chrestine Nels Datter. their daughter, one maid and one lodger (tailor). Jacob Rosetzsiy, a master shoemaker, resided in the building with his mother Karen Saling and two apprentices.

=== 1800–850 ===
The property was prior to the 1801 census acquired by baker Friderich Arnholz. His property was at that time home to a total of 29 residents in two households. Arnholz, who had recently become a widower, resided in the building with his four children (aged one to 13), six bakers, a coachman, a housekeeper, two maids and three lodgers. Jacob Rosetzky, the shoemaker from the 1787 census, was still residing in the building with his wife Ane Margrethe Balle, their four children (aged one to nine) and one lodger.

The property was listed as No. 103 in the new cadastre of 1806. It was at that time owned by baker Johan Rohde.

The bakery was later continued by Gottfried Christian Wilhelm Klenz (1786-1837). It was after his early death continued by his widow Ane Cathrine Klentz (née Drastrup, 1793–1983). At the time of the 1840 census, No. 103 was home to a total of 30 residents. Ane Cathrine Klentz resided in the building with her six children (aged seven to 17), one lodger (student), five bakers, one baker's apprentice, a housekeeper (husjomfru) and a maid. Peter Hansen, a clerk at Politiretten, resided on the second floor with his wife Johanne Claudine Hansen and one maid. Gebhard Foersom, a floor clerk, resided on the third floor with his wife Maria Foersom født Harboe and their one-year-old son. Johan Ernst Ehlom, a master shoemaker, resided in the basement with his wife Jacobine Cathrine Ehlom (née Jakobsen), their three children (aged six to nine) and two shoemakers. The eldest daughter Christine Wilhelmine Magdalene Klenz would later marry founder of Wiibroes Bryggeri in Helsingør Carl Wibroe (1812-1888). Their daughter married Søren Anton van der Aa Kühle.

The bakery was a few years later acquired by master baker Budolph August Jensen. At the time of the 1845 census, Jensen's property was home to a total of 23 residents. The just 30-year-old owner resided on the ground floor with five bakers, one male servant and two maids. Two lodgers resided on the first floor. One of them was the painter Christian Emil Andersen (1817-1944). Mariane Cecilie Jensen (née Tüchsen), a widow, resided on the second floor with her 34-year-old unmarried daughter and one maid. Johann Ernst Ehlern, the shoemaker from the basement, was now resident on the third floor with his family, one shoemaker and three unmarried women needleworkers.

At the time of the 1840 census, No. 103 was home to 27 residents in five households. Søren Christian Sørensen, a new master baker, resided on the ground floor with his wife Karen Marie Petersen, their one-year-old son, five bakers, an apprentice and two maids. Sigismund Fred. Jonas, a professor of economy, resided on the first floor with his wife Marie Fachau, a house keeper, her two children (aged two and four), one lodger and one maid. Mariane Cecilie Jensen Fischer, a widow needleworker, resided on the second floor with two of her children (aged 35 and 39). Ane Dorothea Lund (née Hansen), another widow needleworker, resided on the third floor with her seven-year-old foster daughter, a niece and a lodger (needleworker). Luigi Sandri, a manufacturer of macaroni, resided in the side wing with his wife Louise Marie Bangsrand, one maid and one male servant.

=== Carl Heinrich Winther and the new building ===
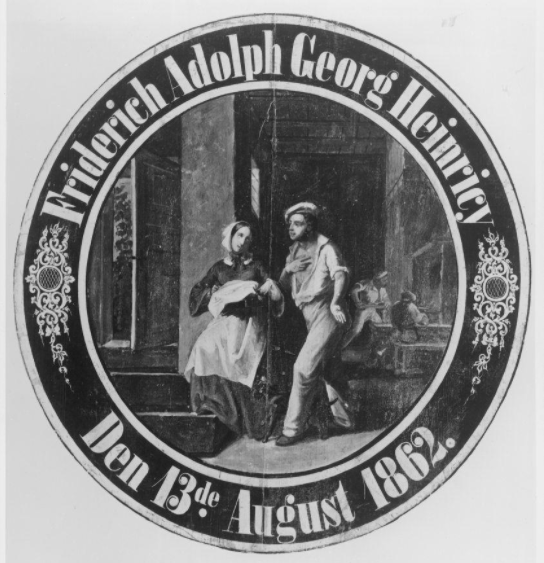
Friderich Adolph Georg Heinricy's membership target from the Royal Copenhagen Shooting Society

The property was acquired by master joiner Carl Heinrich Winther in the first half of the 1850s. The present building complex was constructed for him in 1856–1857. There was also room for a bakery in the new building complex. At the time of the 1860 census, it was home to a total of 68 residents. The owner Carl Heinrich Winther, a master joiner, resided on the third floor with his wife Pauline Kristine (née Holm), their two children (aged 10 and 18), his sister Petrine Jacobine Winther and one maid. Johan Heinrik Christian Breitmayer, a master baker, resided in the building with his wife Andrea Jensine Haderslev, their four children (aged one to six), three bakers, one baker's apprentice, a master tailor, three maids and one male servant. Edward Daniel Jacobsen, a merchant (grosserer), resided on the first floor with a male servant. Wilhelmine Anna Krebs, widow of officer and fire corps director Albrecht Christian Krebs, resided on the second floor with her two children (aged 15 and 23), two lodgers and one maid. Rasmus Christiansen, an innkeeper, resided on the fourth floor with his wife Ane Marie (née Nielsen), their three children (aged two to eight) and one maid.

The bakery was owned by master baker Friderich Adolph Georg Heinricy (1829-) by the time that he joined the Royal Copenhagen Shooting Society in 1862. His father was the owner of a bakery at Strandgade 24 in Christianshavn.

When house numbering by street was introduced in Copenhagen in 1859 (as a supplement to the old cadastral numbers by quarter), No. 1+3, became listed as Gråbrødretorv 17 and Valkendorfsgade 32.

=== 20th century ===
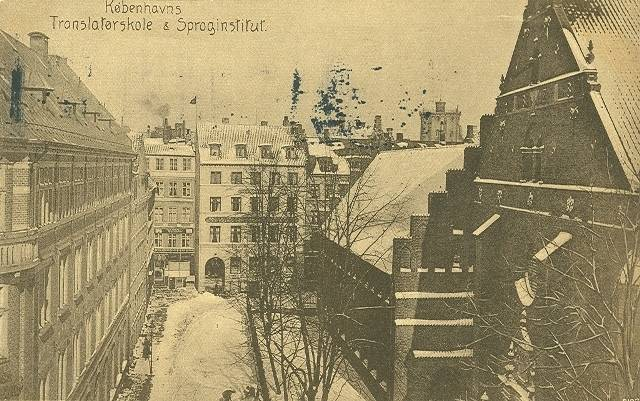
A view down Valkendorfsgade from Str'get, with the Kringlegangen building visible in the background

In the beginning of the 20th century, it was proposed to extend the street Kejsergade to Valkendorfsgade by demolishing Gråbrødretorv 17 and some of the surrounding buildings to create a more obvious link between Skindergade and Strøget. The plans were ultimately given up.

At the time of the 1906 census, Gråbrødretorv 17 was home to just 16 people. Fredrik Sofus Nielsen, a master baker, resided in the building with his wife Marie Charlotte Nielsen. Valdemar Vilhelm Andersen, an engraver, resided on the first floor with his wife Lydia Mary Ann Andersen and their daughter Alice Collius Andersen. Arnold Hermann Jensen, a businessman, resided on the second floor with his wife Dagmar Dorothea Olivia Jensen and their 16-year-old son. Margrethe Jacobsen, a 51-year-old widow, resided on the third floor with her two sons (aged 16 and 24). Anders Andersen, a journalist, resided on the fourth floor with his wife Margrethe Louise Benedikte Andersen.

The complex was listed in the Danish registry of protected buildings and places by the Danish Heritage Agency in 1945. The passageway through the complex was opened to the public in 1975. The name Kringlegangen was the result of a competition.

== Architecture ==
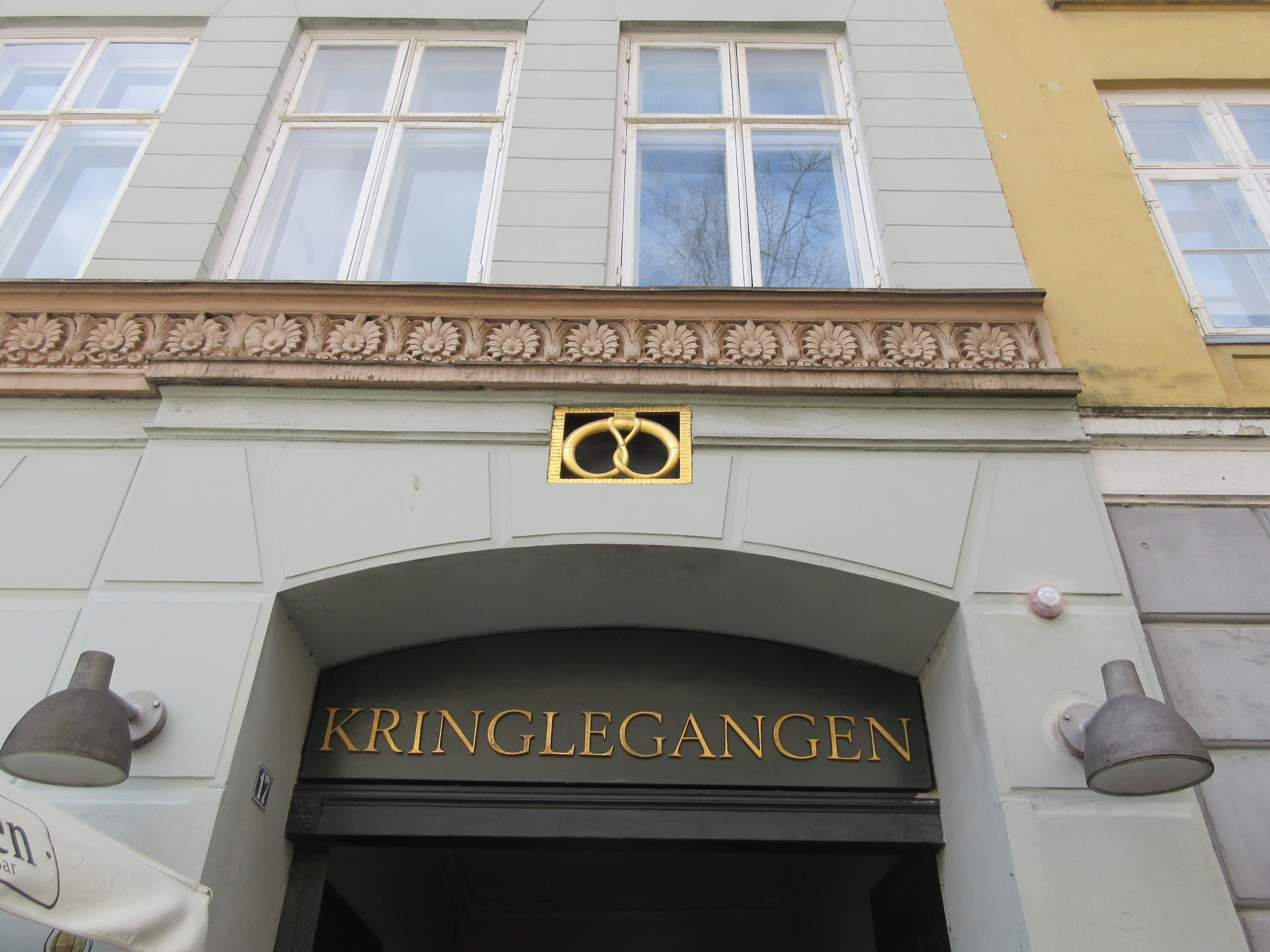
Gråbrødretorv 17: Detail of the facade

The complex consists of a four-storey and four-bays-wide building towards Gråbrødretorv (Gråbrødretorv 17) and a five-storey and five-bays-wide building towards Valkendorfsgade (Valkendorfsgade 32). The side wings of the two buildings are attached to each other along the northeastern margin of a central courtyard. Another side wing (Gråbrødretorv 17 A-B) extends from the rear side of Valkendorfsgade 32 along the southwestern margin of the courtyard and is at the other end attached to a former warehouse.

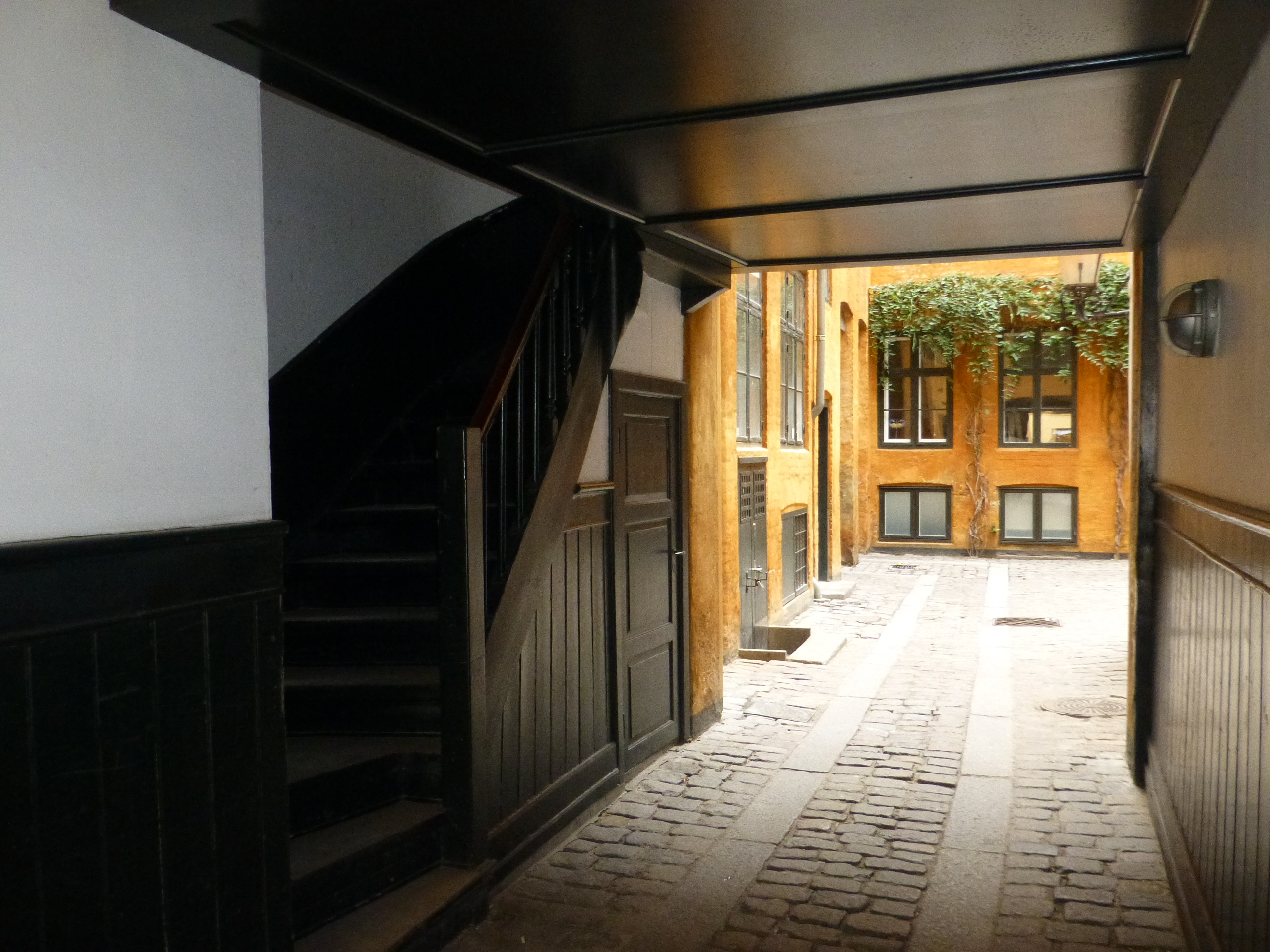
Gråbrødretorv 17: The gateway, with the main staircase visible to the left

The facade of Gråbrødretorv 17 is finished with shadow joints, a frieze with acanthus ornamentation above the ground floor and a simple cornice below the roof. A golded kringle is seen above the gateway in the right hand side of the building. The windows on the third floor are accented with sills supported by corbels. The pitched red tile roof is pierced by two chimneys, one at each gable. Access to the main staircase is via an opening in the gateway. The yard side of the building is rendered in a warm orange colour. The side wing consists of two full bays and a canted corner bay. It is topped by a monopitched red tile roof.

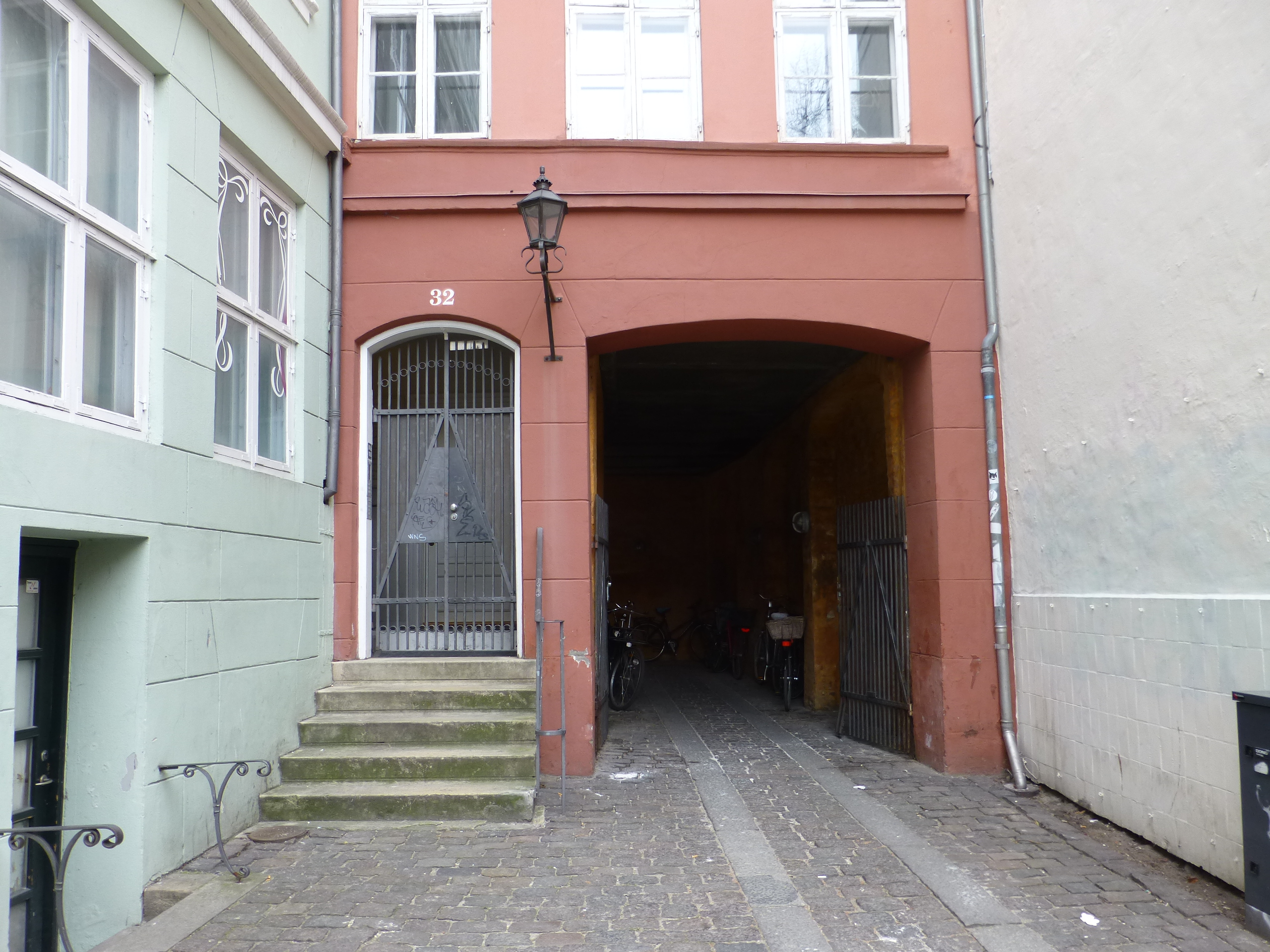
Valkendrofsgade 32, seen from the street

Valkendorfsgade is set back from the street compared to the adjacent building at No 30. Two of its five bays are hidden by the perpendicular building at No. 34, leaving it with only three bays visible from the street. The plastered facade is finished with a belt course above the ground floor, sill courses below the windows on the upper floors and a cornice. The gateway is located in the right-hand-side of the building. The main entrance to the left of it is accessed via a staircase with five steps.

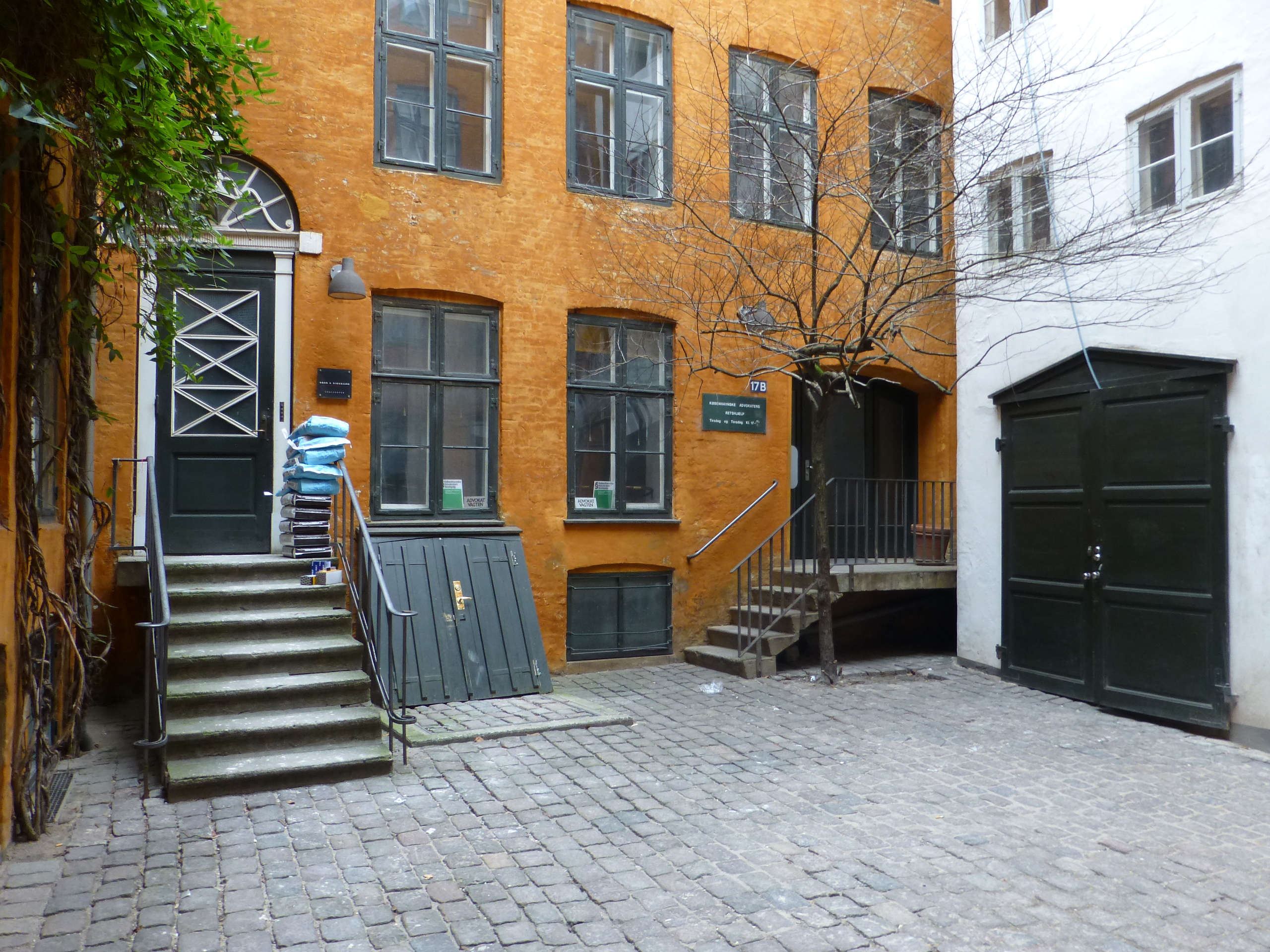
Gråbrødretorv 17 A-B, with a bit of the warehouse visible to the right

Gråbrødretorv 17 A-B is constructed with four storeys over a basement#walk-out basement. Five windows face the courtyard and the rest of the building is hidden behind the warehouse. The main entrance is accessed via a staircase with six steps in the bay farthest to the left. The door is topped by a decorative fanlight and flanked by pilasters.

The warehouse has a bow-shaped corner and is rendered white. The facade that faces the side wing of Gråbrødretorv 17 is crowned by a wall dormer with a pulley beam, and below it is an opening on each floor. The facade that faces Valkendorfsgade 32 features a large gate topped by a flat triangular pediment.

== Today ==
The property is owned by Ejerforeningen Valkenforf. Gråbrødretorv 17 contains a restaurant on the ground floor and one apartment on each of the upper floors. Valkendorfsgade contains two apartments on each floor. The apartments to the left are accessed via a door in the courtyard. Gråbrødretorv 17A contains one apartment on each floor.

== Gallery ==
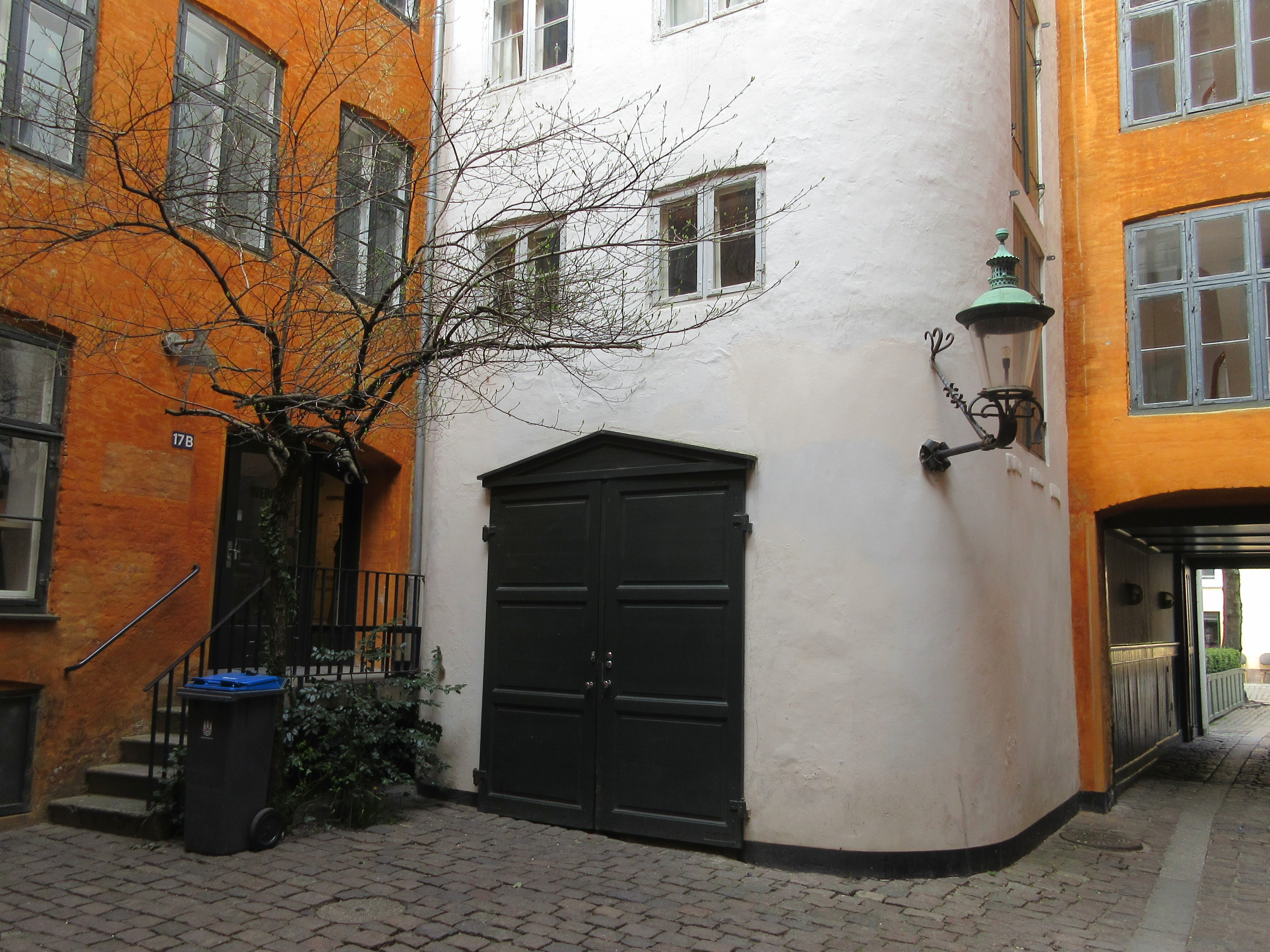

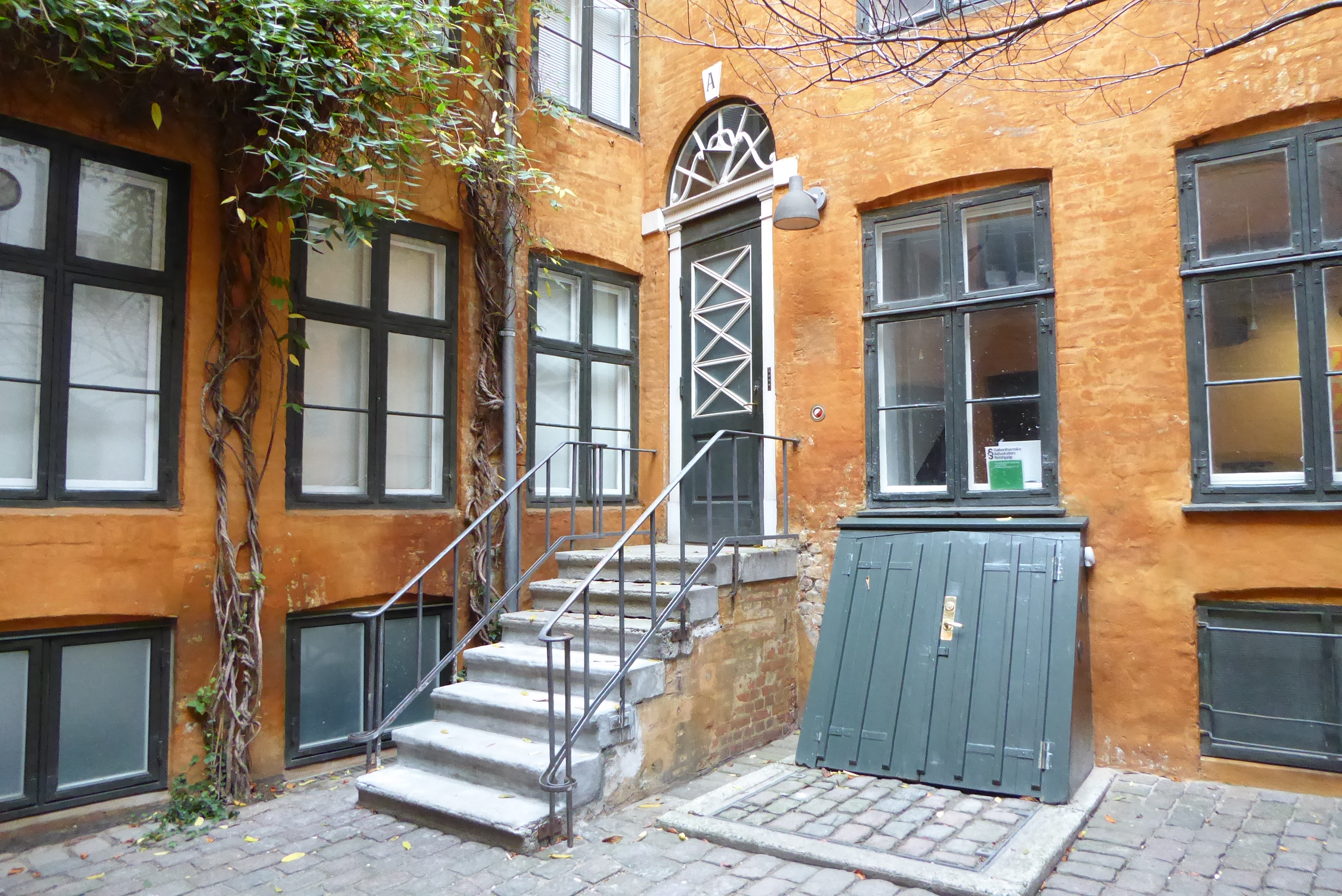

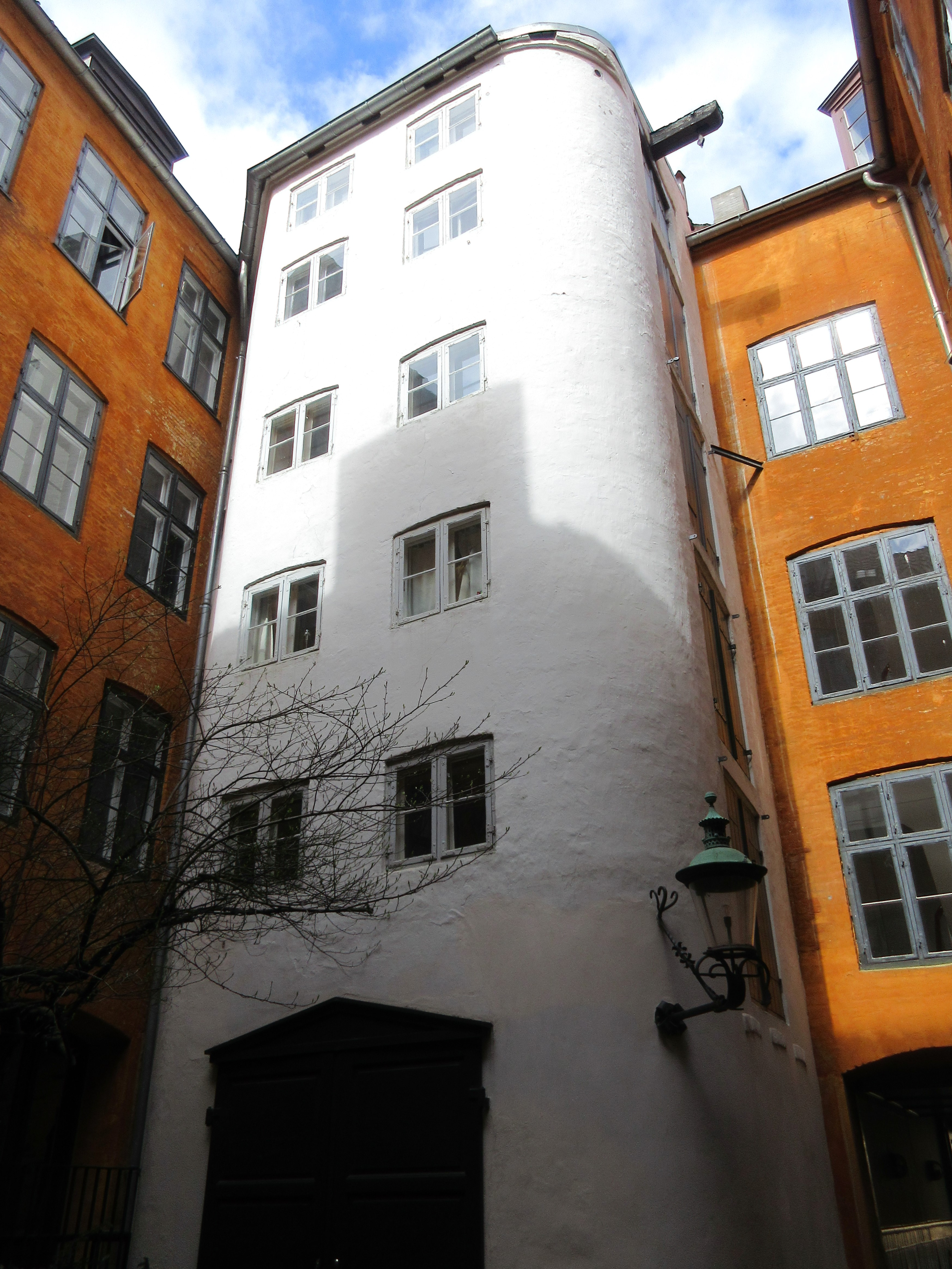

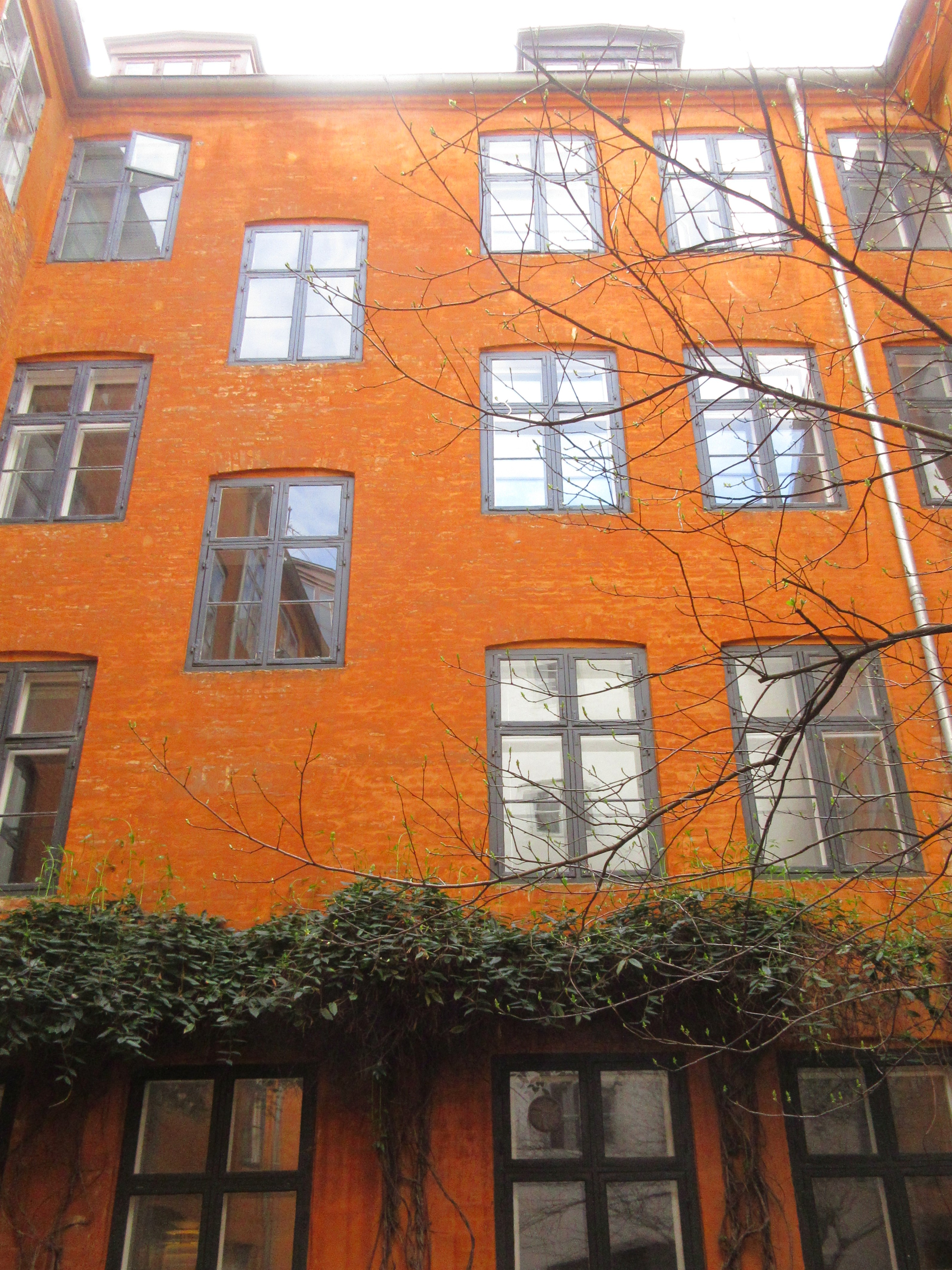

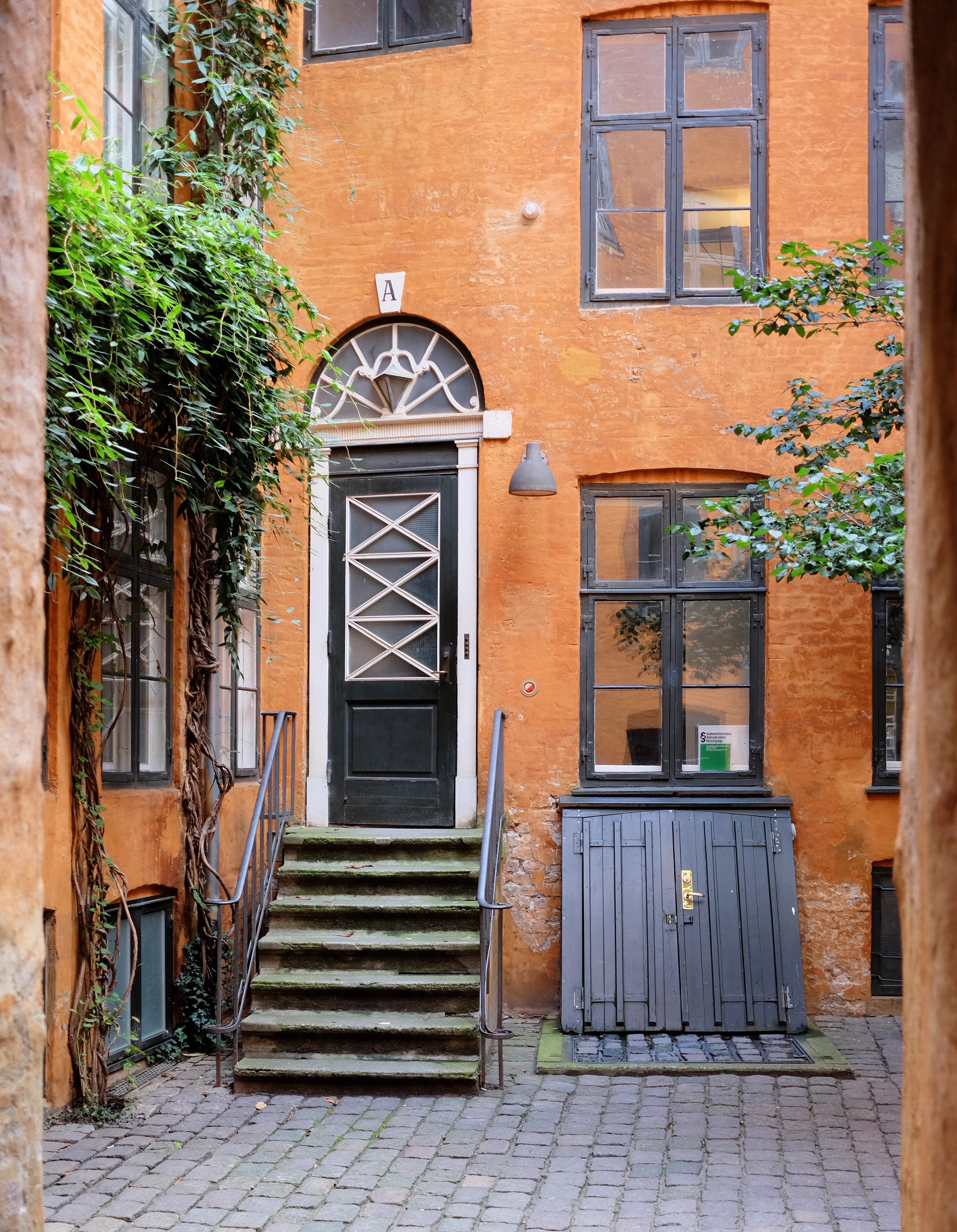

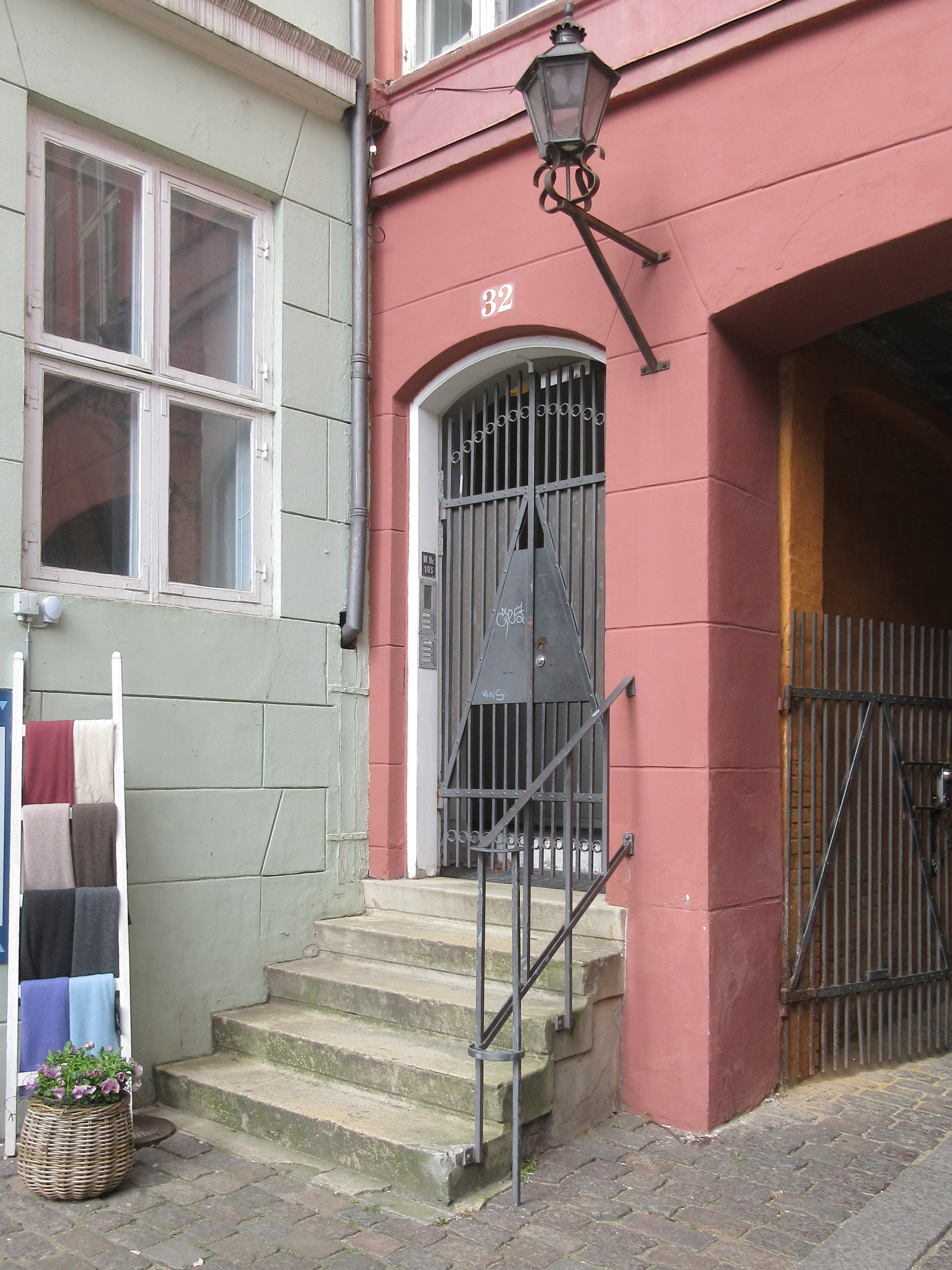
