= Grosserer-Societetet =

Danish wholesaler organization

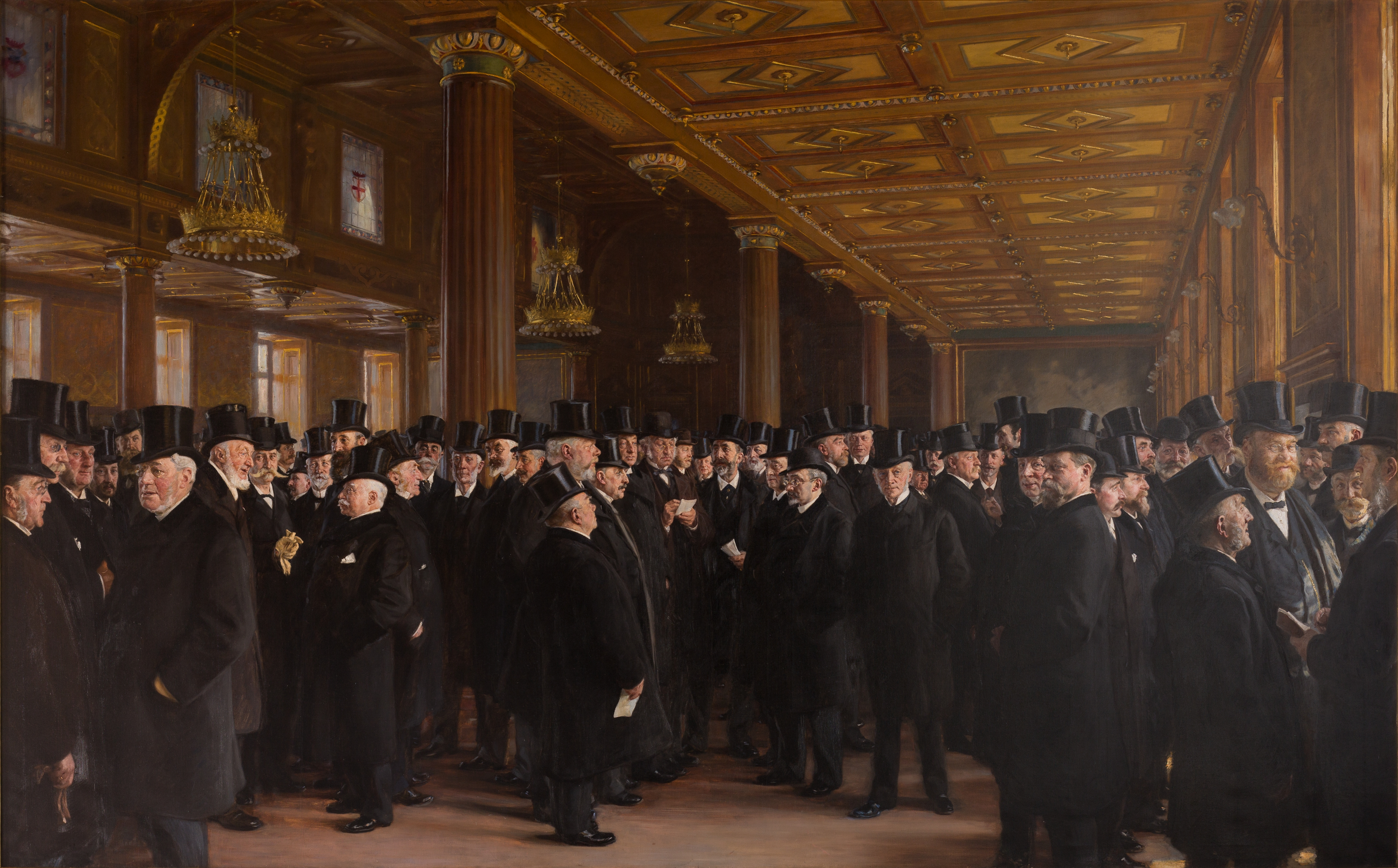
P. S. Krøyer: From Copenhagen Stock Exchange, 1895, Børsen

The Grosserer-Societetet (transl. Wholesalers' Society) was a society for wholesale merchants in Copenhagen founded by law in 1742. After 1714, it was possible to acquire citizenship as a wholesaler in the city. Grosserer-Societetet was reorganized in 1817. In 1987 the association was replaced by the Danish Chamber of Commerce.

== History ==
Grosserer-Societetet was founded by law in 1742. The inaugural meeting took place on 31 August 1842 in Sø-Assurance-Compagniet's offices. The meeting was attended by Hans Hendrick Beck, Andreas Bjørn, Oluf Blach, P. Bortman, Søren G. Elsegaard, Michael Fabritius & Wever, Carl Hieronimus Gustmeyer, Joost van Hemert, Johan P. Issenberg, Søren Jørgensen, Jens Gregersen Klitgaard, Daniel Lindeman and Rasmus Sternberg.

The society was initially headed by a chairman and two elders. Membership in Grosserer-Societetet required proof of maintaining an office, being trained as merchant, owning stakes in one or more ships, as well as keeping international correspondence.

In 1797, 48 of Copenhagen's 70–80 wholesale merchants with citizenship as grosserer were members of Grosserer-Societetet. As of 16 June 1809, the number of wholesale merchants in Copenhagen had increased to 173 (cf. list below).

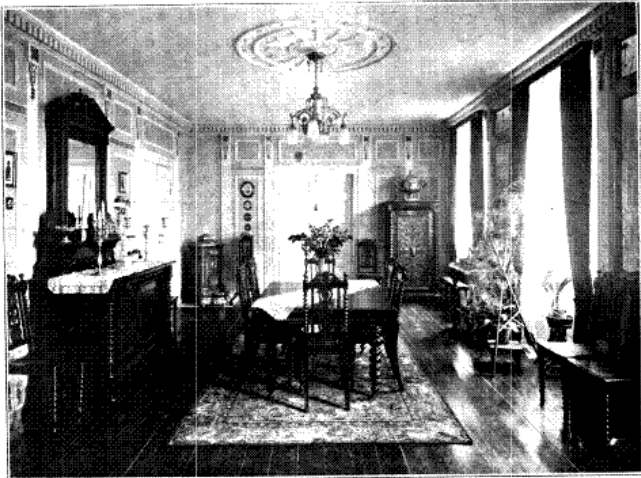
The room in the Sundorph House where the 1817 meeting took place

Grosserer-Societetet was reorganized in 1817. Its affairs were from then on managed by a committee whose 13 members were elected at the Grosserer-Societetet's annual general meetings.

In 1886, Wilhelmine Rerup became the first female member. Caroline Herding became the second female member of the organisation.

As of 1969, it was no longer mandatory for businesspeople with the title of grosserer (wholesaler) to be members of Grosserer-Societetet. In 1987, it merged with Provinshandelskammeret (founded in 1901) as Det Danske Handelkammer (from 2000 Handelskammeret and from 2007 part of the Danish Chamber of Commerce, Dansk Erhverv).

== Location ==
Grosserer-Societetet was initially based in bank cashier Lacoppidan's building at Købmagergade 35. As of 1804, its meetings were held in a room in the Sundorph House at Ved Stranden 10. In 1857, Frederick VII sold the building to Grosserer-Societetet for 70,000 rigsdaler.

== Activities ==
Grosserer-Societet's committee represented the merchant class equally before the government and the Rigsdag (Parliament) and acted as its external representative wherever it was necessary to safeguard its special interests. Grosserer-Societetet was from its 1817 reorganisation based in the Sundorph House prior to purchasing the Stock Exchange building, which it purchased in 1857 and supervised, managed daily stock exchange meetings, issued responses to questions whose answers required special commercial expertise, participated in the election of the members of the Maritime and Commercial Court, held brokerage examinations, participated in the official fixing of the exchange rate and supervised the Copenhagen Stock Exchange. Attached to the committee were assessment and arbitration committees for the grain trade, the feed trade, the seed trade and the butter trade, as well as a committee for setting the price quotes for Danish butter. Since 1888, the committee published a detailed annual trade report. Finally, the committee managed the Brockian Business Schools (today Niels Brock Copenhagen Business College; see Niels Brock), a benefit fund, to which fines assessed for not attending the stock exchange on time (spærrepenge) are donated; as well as a large number of grants.

== Commemoration ==
Peder Severin Krøyer depicted some of the society's members in his monumental group portrait painting From Copenhagen Stock Exchange. Carl Nielsen wrote a cantata, Kantate ved Grosserer-Societetets Hundredsaarsfest, to commemorate its 100th anniversary.

== Chairmen ==
This list is incomplete.

=== 1742–1817 ===
	Portrait	Chairman	Term	Notes
1		Nicolai Burmester	1642	
2		Gregorius Klauman	1746–1752	
		Peter Borre	1762–1789	
		Christian Hansen	1776–1775	
		Johann Ludvig Zinn	1790–1802	
		Hans Rudolph Saabye	1802–	

=== 1817–1987 ===
	Portrait	Chairman	Term	Notes
		Erich Erichsen	1817–?	
		Friederich Tutein	1832–1842	
		Lauritz Nicolai Hvidt	1842–1850	
		Andreas Nicolai Hansen	1850–?	
		Moritz G. Melchior	1873–1884	
1		Carl Frederik Tietgen	1885–	
		Harald Klitgaard	1912–1915	
		C. C. Claussen	1915–1920	
1		Ernst Meyer	1922–1933	
		Rudolph Schmidt	1941–1948	
		Victor B. Strand	1966–1969	

== Citizenship as a wholesaler ==
=== Died before 1809 ===
Name	Citizenship	Location	Notes
Joost van Hemert	1727		
Michael Fabritius	1732		
Andreas Bodenhoff	1749		
Peter Borre	1750	Strandgade 44	
Peter Fenger	1752	Strandgade 8	
John Brown	1755		
Peter van Hemert	1765		
Johan Jacob Frolich		Lille Strandstræde 20 (1787)	
Knud Christensen		Langebrogade 15	

=== Members in 1809 ===
People with citizenship as wholesalers in Copenhagen as of 16 June 1809, arranged chronologically by year that citizenship was acquired:

	Name	Citizenship	Location	Notes
1.	Christian Hansen	1764	Amagertorv 6	
2.	Jørgen Bech	1764	Toldbodgade 15	
3.	Frédéric de Coninck	1765	Dronningens Tværgade 2	
4.	Lars Larsen		Nyhavn 63	
5.	Andreas Buntzen	1772	Overgaden oven Vandet 54	
6.	Pierre Peschier		Holmens Kanal 12	
7.	Peter Rabe Holm		Strandgade 22	
8.	Charles August Selby	1777	Strandgade 24	
9.	Rasmus Kirketerp	1777	Toldbodgade 2 / Nyhavn 49	
10.	Christian Ludvig Lütken		Lille Strandstræde 20 (1801), Amaliegade 13	
11.	Thomas Potter		Overgaden Oven Vandet 10	
12.	Andreas Collstrop		Holmens Kanal 10	
13.	David Amsel Meyer	1780	Frederiksholms Kanal 6	
14.	Rasmus Selmer		Nyhavn 57 (1787), Nybrogade 12 (1801) |	
15.	Bernhard Henrich Hilker		Sankt Annæ Plads 10 (part of, 1787)	
16.	Friderich Wewer			
17.	Ole Berendt Suhr		Gammeltorv 22	
18.	Jens Jyde		Mutorv 11 (1787)	
19.	Hans Friis		Kvæsthusgade 5	
20.	Caspar Peter Bügel	1783	Frederiksholms Kanal 16–18	
21.	H. J. Cantor			
22.	G. L. Becker		Gammeltorv 18	
23.	J. L. Junghans			
24.	Gotfried Halkier		Overgaden Neden Vandet 39 (1787)	
25.	Thomas Ter-Borch		Dronningens Tværgade 7	
26.	A. L. Warberg		Store Kirkestræde 3	
27.	Erich Erichsen		Holmens Kanal 18	
28.	Emanuel Falckner		Lille Strandstræde 20 (1787)	
29.	Johannes Schartau		Brogade 1 (1801)	
30.	Knud Tang		Gothersgade 12 (1787)	
31.	Johann Ludvig Zinn	1767	Kvæsthusgade 3	
32.	Johann Christoph August Bindseil		Fortunstræde, Nyhavn 17, Vildmanden	
33.	Hans Rudolph Saabye		Amaliegade 10	
34	Hans Wassard		Vimmelskaftet 30	
35.	John Christmas		Overgaden Oven vandet 6 (1793–), Ny Kongensgade 1 (1800–)	
36.	Hans Staal Hagen		Amaliegade 14	
37.	Jeppe Prætorius		Overgaden Neden Vandet 39 (1792–1823)	
38.	Casper Fried. Fiedler		Vimmelskaftet 49	
39.	Albrecht Ludvig Schmidt		Ved Stranden 2	
40.	S. C. Wedege			
41.	Christian Faber Birch		Kvæsthusgade 5	
42	Jacob Agier			
43.	Niels Brock Hansen		Strandgade 36	
44	Georg Daniel von der Pahlen		Laksegade 4, Vingårdstræde 1–3	
45.	Carl Ludvig Drewsen		Amaliegade 16	
46.	Christian Thomsen		Amaliegade 7	
47.	William Duntzfelt	1795	Amaliegade 24	
48.	Joseph Nath. David		Badstuestræde 11 (1801)	
49.	Johannes Søbøtker			
50.	Jens Harboe			
51.	Frid. Ch. Friderici		Ved Stranden 20	
52.	peter Friedrich Becker			
53.	J. P. Hjorthøy			
54.	Morten Cortsen		Kvæsthusgade 1 (1801)	
55.	Andreas Petersen			
56.	Peter Møller			
57.	Schambach Selboe		Børsgade 50, Slotsholmsgade 49	
58.	Jacob Thostrup		Wildersgade 49	
59.	Johan David Vogel		Strandgade 30	
60.	Daniel Walker			
61.	Moses Levin Mariboe		Østergade 13	
62.	Hans Kye		Store Strandstræde 20	
63.	Peter Tutein		Købmagergade 42 (1801)	
64.	Friederich Tutein		Vimmelskaftet 47	
65.	Diederich Tutein		Vimmelskaftet 39	
66.	Laurentius Nicolas Cramer			
67.	Isac Larpent		Købmagergade 5	
68.	Christ. Daniel Otte		Amaliegade 12	
69.	Rasmus Schifter		Overgaden Oven Vandet 28	
70.	Joh. Rud. Meyer			
71.	Johan Jacob Leiner			
72.	Francois le Chevalier			
73.	Niels Frederik Læssøe		Nørre Kvarter No. 116 (1801)	
74.	Joh. Gerhard Møller			
75.	H. G. Christensen			
76.	Gottlieb Eichel		Pilestræde 115 (1845)	
77.	Ferdinand Gotthilf Kellermann		Kvæsthusgade 1 (1801)	
78.	Jørgen Christian Krossing		Rorvegade 29	
79.	Jens Johansen			
80.	Hans Peder Kofoed		Overgaden Neden Vandet 11	
81.	Oluf Løvgreen			
82.	Johannes Gregorius Veith		Gammel Strand 42	
83.	Moses Bendix			
84.	Nicolai C. Reimer			
85.	C. S. Mangor		Bredgade 60	
86.	Wilh. Aug. Raasch			
87.	Anders Nielsen			
88.	Johan Frid. Zinn		Store Kongensgade 68	
89.	J. M. Damkiær			
90	C. F. G. Herre			
91.	O. J. Arnemann			
92.	C. Fantauzzi d'Orfee			
93.	Georg Fridrich Wilhelm Scheuermann		Kvæsthusgade 3	
94.	Johannes Hammerich		Nybrogade 10	
95.	Mads Fonnesbech		Østergade 61	
96.	Marcus Stampe			
97.	Jacob Seeler			
98.	Alexander Watt			
99.	Lauritz Lauritzen		Nytorv 7	
100.	Gotthilf Ludwig Køppen	1804		
101.	Peder Wedersøe		Nyhavn 17	
102.	Peder Cøster			
133.	J. W. v. Halle			
104.	C. F. A Wulff			
105.	James Gordon			
106.	J. S. Meyer			
107.	Meyer Seligman Trier		Møntergade 20 (1801)	
108.	Andreas Frederik Beyer			
109.	Nathaniel Cox			
111.	Alexius Hoffmann			
112.	Peter Friderich Lowe		Admiralgade 25 (18101713)	
113.	Jens Peter Jensen			
114.	W. C. Good			
115.	Jens Holbech		Nyhavn 35, Amaliegade 5	
116.	J. H. Malling			
117.	B. Wichmann			
118.	D. C. Welling			
119.	Jørgen Peter Bech		Nybrogade 24	
120.	Hermann Christian Müffelmann		Bredgade 38	
121.	Mathias Sartz			
122.	F. B. Branner			
123.	Peter Kofoed			
124.	Isac Benners			
125.	Laurentius Collstrup			
126.	V. N. Mangor			
127.	Carl Ferrall			
128.	V. N. Mangor			
139.	C. J. Hasfeldt			
130.	A. L. Schmidt			
131.	J. J. v. Hemert			
132.	J. F. Hoch			
133.	P. R. W. Mariboe			
134.	R. J. Schmidt			
135.	F. A. Eschee			
136.	S. C. Gustmeyer			
137.	Christ. Broberg			
138.	N. C. Wedersoe			
139.	J. L. Nathanson			
140.	G. F. Holm			
141.	Jens Jensen Berg		Dronningens Tværgade 3	
142.	E. C. Busch			
143.	Erich Nissen		Nyhavn 53	
144.	Gerson Moses Melchior		Amagertorv 11 (1810–)	
145.	Falch Aron			
146.	Hans Lausen			
147.	C. F. Wohlermann			
148.	J. J. Holbech			
149.	N. O. Botch			
150.	H. P. Duus			
151.	K. A. Christiani.			
152.	Iver Wibroe			
153.	Georg Jørgefisen			
154.	C. H. Bentzen			
155.	Niels Christian Rudolph Saabye			
156.	P. F. van Wyllich			
157.	Christen Fogh			
158.	L. B. Hollænder			
159.	August Gøtæe			
160.	P. P. Kofoed			
161.	Poul Andreas Collstrop		Ny Kongensgade 7	
162.	Laue Jessen Maag		Ny Vestergade 13 (1811–)	
163.	J. D. Meyer			
164.	Johan Jacob Petzholdt			
165.	Niels Møller			
166.	Claus Carstens			
167.	Peter Jacob Topp		Nørre Voldgade 62/Nørregade 42	
168.	Peter Mosbøll			
169.	Magnus Ipsen			
170.	Christian Rønnenkamp		Amaliegade 4	
171.	Andreas Leisner		Bredgade 39	
172.	Ole Christian Gammeltoft		Kompagnistræde 2, Lille Strandstræde 6	
173.	A. C. F. Schrøder			

=== Citizenship as a wholesaler after 1809 ===
Name	Citizenship	Location	Notes
Georg Petersen	?		Member of Grosserer-Societetet's committee 1863–1881
Harald Fritsche	?		Member of Grosserer-Societetet's committee 1874–1893
Harald Hansen	?		Member of Grosserer-Societetet's committee 1893–1902
Andreas Buntzen	1812	Overgaden oven Vandet 54	
Joseph Hambro	1812	Kongens Nytorv	
Hans Puggaard	1813	Store Kongensgade 62	
Nicolai Jonathan Meinert	?	Store Kongensgade 62	Member of Grosserer-Societetet's committee 1834–1756
Emil Zeuthen Svitzer	1820		
Henrik Danchell	1928		Store Kongensgade 62
David Halberstadt	1834		Member of Grosserer-Societetet's committee from 1857
Arnold Eugen Reimann	1854		Member of Grosserer-Societetet's committee 1914–1919
Christian August Broberg	1835		Member of Grosserer-Societetet's committee 1842–1863
Jacob Herman Mannheimer	1857		
Hans Peter Johan Lyngbye	1863		
Julius Bernburg	1864		
Holger Petersen	1868		
Frantz Thestrup Adolph	1869		
David Baruch Adler	1850	Ved Stranden 14	Member of Grosserer-Societetet's committee 1775–1878
Christian Kjellerup Hansen	1856		
Augustin Gamél	1866		
Frederik Carl Christian Johansen Baune	1871		
Julius Kopp	1872		
Sophus Munk Plum	1873		
Jacob Herman Mannheimer	1876		
Carl Holten	1766		
Harald Klitgaard	?		Member of Grosserer-Societetet's committee 1894–1820
Carl G. Melchior	1882		
Christian Johannes Kampmann	1886		
Carl G. Melchior	1892		
Christen Daell	1892		
Hans Hald Sthyr	1893		
Christian Saugman	1930		
Westy Stephensen			Committee member from 1908
