= Christian Hansen (businessman) =

Danish businessman

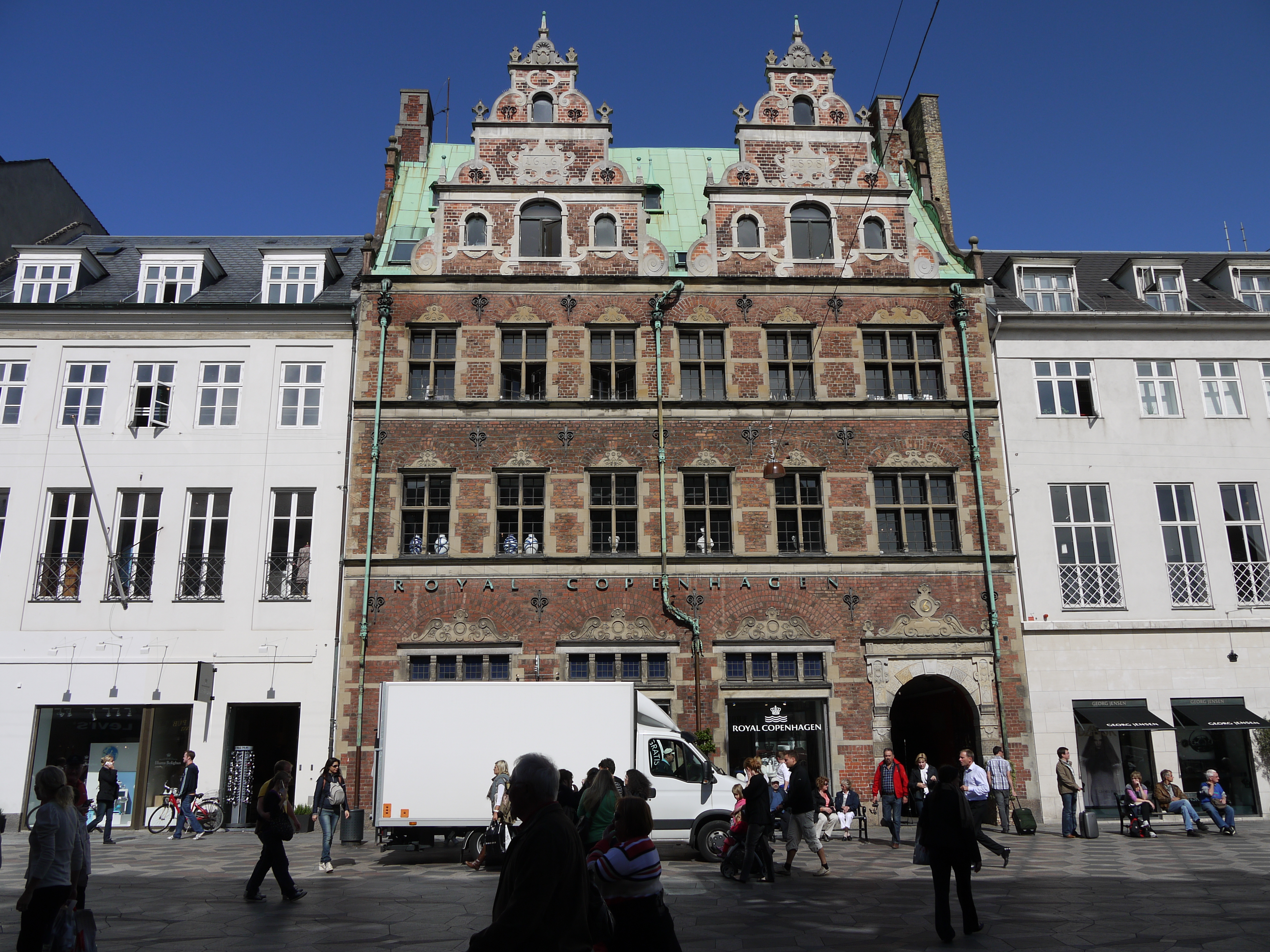
Christian Hansen's former property on Amagertorv in Copenhagen

Christian Hansen (7 November 1728 – 4 May 1810) was a Danish businessman who served as president of Grosserer-Societetet (1775–1790) and the Council of 32 Men (1795–1810). In 1771–1784, he also served as one of the directors of Kjøbenhavns Brandforsikring (Copenhagen Fire Insurance Company). He owned the property Amagertorv 6 in Copenhagen.

== Early life ==
Hansen was born on 8 November 1728 in Schleswig. Nothing is known about his early years.

== Career ==
On 10 October 1764, Hansen was granted citizenship as a wholesaler (grosserer) in Copenhagen. In the same year, he became a member of Grosserer-Societetet. As of 16 June 1809, the number of wholesale merchants in Copenhagen had increased to 173 (cf. list below). He traded as Hansen, Vett & Compagnie. On 10 May 1771, he replaced Hans Christian Bech as one of the directors of Kjøbenhavns Brandforsikring. On 5 February 1784, he was himself replaced by Jørgen Thomsen Bech. He was a co-owner and one of the directors of Kattinge Works at Roskilde. By 1800, he had become its sole owner.

After Peter Borre's death in 1775, Hansen served as president of Grosserer-Societetet. In 1790, he resigned from the post. He was succeeded by Johann Ludvig Zinn.

== Public offices ==
In 1770, he was elected as one of the city's 32 Men. He served as president of the Council of 32 Men from 1795 until his death. He also served as curator of Royal Weissen House.

== Personal life ==
Christian Hansen was married twice. His second wife was Mariane Valeur, (1739–1820). She was a daughter of mayor Johannes Valeur and Charlotte Sophia Bulcke. Their only child, Charlotte Hedvig Hansen, born in 1783, did not survive childhood.

Hansen bought the property Amagertorv 6 for 14,000 Danish rigsdaler in 1763. In 1773–79, he also owned Gentoftegaard north of the city.
