= Kjøbenhavns Brandforsikring =

Defunct Danish fire insurance company

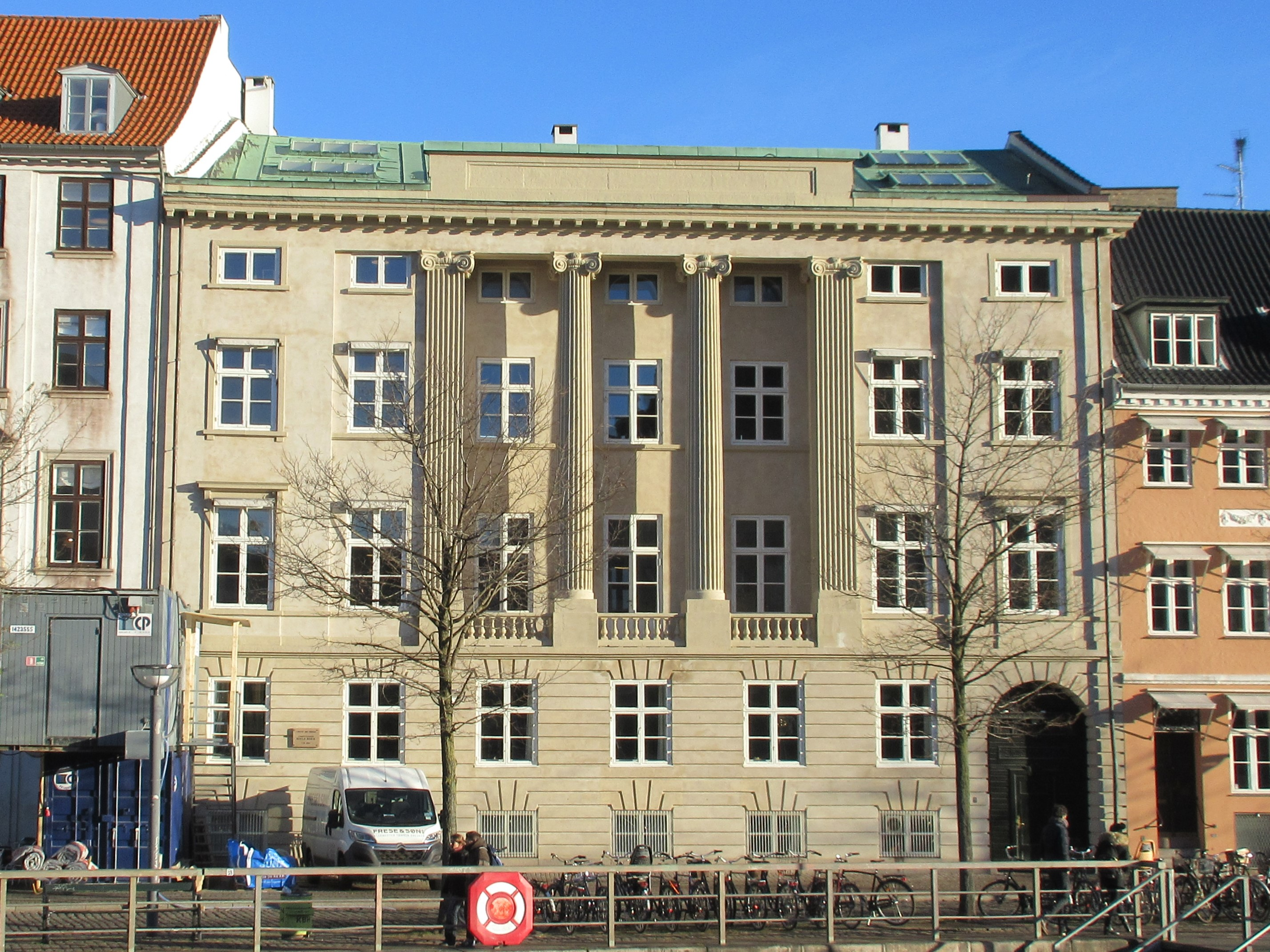
- Former headquarters
- Industry: Insurance
- Founded: 1731
- Founders: Hans Henrik Bech; Hans Hansen Berg
- Defunct: 1976
- Fate: Merger
- Successor: Tryg
- Headquarters: Copenhagen, Denmark

Kjøbenhavns Brandforsikring, founded in 1731, was the first Danish provider of fire insurance in Denmark. It existed as an independent enterprise until 1976 and is now part of Tryg. The company's last headquarters was the Gustmeyer House at Ved Stranden 14 in central Copenhagen.

== History ==
The Copenhagen Fire of 1728 devoured around 28% of the buildings in Copenhagen. The merchants Hans Henrik Bech (c. 1699 – 1783) and Hans Hansen Berg (1688–1736) proposed a fire insurance scheme and Kjøbenhavns Brandforsikring was founded by royal resolution on 26 January 1731. The fire insurance was instrumental in speeding up the rebuilding of the city since lending out money for construction projects became less risky. The first building was insured on 21 December 1731 by Otto Blome at Amagertorv 4.

Kjøbenhavns Brandforsikring was originally only active in the market for fire insurance of buildings located inside the City Walls but from 1889 it gradually opened up for fire insurance on buildings in Frederiksberg and a number of surrounding districts.

The company was based in the Gustmeyer House at Ved Stranden 14 and its last CEO was Frits Pedersen. The company merged with Danmark/Tryg/Fremtiden G/S under the name Tryg Forsikring in 1976.

=== Directors ===
	Director	Term	Residence	Notes
1.	Lauritz Rasmussen			
2.	Christopher Jensen Lund			
3.	Hans Hansen Berg			
4.	Peder Arfversøn	13 September 1731 – 12 March 1737		
5.	Hans Breckwoldt			
6.	Niels Prydtz	17 March 1737 –		
7.	David Johan Berenctz			
8.	Jens Gregersen Klitgaard			
9.	Nicolai Wesling	12 March 1737 – 7 March 1740		
10.	Kjeld Wendal	12 March 1739 – 7 March 1740		
11.	Hans Nygaard	– 13 August 1739		
12.	Hans Henrich Bech	13 August 1739 – 12 September 1842		
14.	Nicolaes von Hütten	7 March 1740 – 14 March 1743		
15.	Ole Hansen Aagaard	7 March 1740 – 14 March 1743		
16.	S'ren Jørgensen	7 March 1740 – 14 March 1743		
17.	Rasmus Sternberg	12 September 1742 – 6 September 1745		
18.	Rasmus Munch	12 September 1742 – 6 September 1745		
19.	Bjørn Mørch	14 March 1743 – 10 March 1746		
20.	Winand Thyme	1743 –		
21.	Hans Christian Brock	14 March 1743 – 10 March 1746		
22.	Friderich Lunge	6 September 1745 – 17 October 1748		
23.	Jacob Jørgensen Klog	6 September 1745 – 17 October 1748		
24.	Bertel Jegind	10 March 1746 – 14 October 1749		
25.	Thomas Carstensen Bargum	10 March 1746 – 14 October 1749		
26.	Schønning Andersen	10 March 1746 – 14 October 1749		
27.	Lorentz Lorentzen	16 October 1748 – 29 October 1751		
28.	Peter Boertmann	17 October 1748 – 29 October 1751		
29.	Jogan Herman Stenberg	14 October 1749 – 29 March 1751		
30.	Hans Henrik Garben	14 October 1749 – 4 December 1755		
31.	Christopher Klog	14 October 1749 – April 1750		
32.	Æars Jensen Fint			
33.	Jacob Rohde	21 March 1751 –		
34.	Niels Hansen Seuersløw	29 October 1751 – January 1751		
35.	Frederik Barfred	29 October 1751 –		
36.	Oluf Mandix	4 December 1755 –		
37.	Svend Købke	19 March 1762 – 10 May 1771		
38.	Peter Nicolai Schøtt	19 March 1762 –		
39.	Jens Pedersen Juelbye	19 March 1762 – 29 November 1776		
40.	Didricg Barthold Beckman	24 July 1767 – 29 November 1776		
41.	Jens Wedege	25 November 1768 – 26 April 1781		
42.	Hans Christian Bech	2 March 1770 – 1771		
43.	Christian Poul Frese	10 May 1771 – 8 April 1775		
44.	Christian Hansen	10 May 1771 – 5 February 1784		
45.	Aage Kaasbøll	29 November 1776 – 5 February 1784		
46.	Jens Lauritzen	29 November 1776 – 9 May 1787		
47.	Peter Thomsen	26 April 1781 – 9 May 1787		
48.	Christian Ludvig Butz	26 April 1781 – 21 September 1787		
49.	Jørgen Thomsen Bech	5 February 1784 – 12 May 1791		
50.	Jens Johansen Mylius	5 February 1784 – 12 May 1791		
51.	Lars Larsen	9 May 1787 – 7 May 1793		
52.	Andreas Lausen Collstrop	9 May 1787 – 26 June 1794		
53.	Andreas Skibsted	6 March 1786 – 16 April 1790		
54.	David Christian Emanuel Wulff	6 March 1897 – 16 April 1790		
55.	Rasmus Kirketerp	16 April 1790 – 27 May 1795		
56.	Knud Christensen	12 May 1791 – 27 May 1795		
57.	Hans Peder Kofoed	8 May 1793 – 1795		
58.	Valentin Madsen	25 January 1684 – 19 June 1795		
59.	Børge Nicilai Fogh	25 June 1684 –		
60.	Jens Lang(e)	27 May 1795 –		
61.	Thøger From	19 June 1684 – 19 June 1795		
62.	Peter Andresen	19 June 1795 –		
63.	Jørgen Frederik Bøgh	25 January 1684 –		
64.	Johan David Vogel	19 June 1795 –		
65.	Hans Wassard	25 January 1684 – 19 June 1795		
66.	Caspar Friderich Fiedler	25 January 1684 –		
67.	Johan Nicolai Tetens			
68.	Frantz Philip Nicolai Lange			
69.	Ole Pedersen Holm			
70.	Niels Hoftved	12 August 1795– 23 November 1799		
71.	Jens Nielsen Kornbeck	12 August 1795 – 21 April 1796		
72.	Rasmus Hansen Lange	13 June 1796 – 8 September 1802		
73.	Andreas Jensen Hbidbjerg	19 March 1800 – 9 October 1811		
74.	Frederik Horn			
75.	Johan Peter Boye Junge	3 May 1805 – 22 February 1807		
76.	Johan Købke	24 September 1805 – 1o June 1816		
77.	Peter Meyn	3 April 1807 – 11 April 18+8		
78.	Christian Magdalus Thestrup	11 December 1796 –		
79.	Johan Boye Junge	17 February 1819 – 6 June 1814		
80.	Just Michael Aagaard	19 October 1811 –		
81.	Peder Malling	31 July 1816 –		
82.	Peter Rabe Holm	16 October 1816 – 23 October 1823		
83.	Erich Møller	19 October 1819 – 1825		
84.	Michael Skibsted	3 October 1823 – 26 October 1826		
85.	Holger Peter Sommer Clausen	11 November 1824 –		
86.	Andreas Rudolph Hornbech	27 October 1825 – 21 February 1861		
87.	Knud Engelbreth Langberg	27 October 1825 – 23 March 1835		
88.	Jonas Collin	6 June 1826 – 12 August 1845		
89.	Jacob Ferdinand Wilse	26 October 1826 – 19 December 1829		
90.	Christian Ludcig Lassen	11 April 1828 – 9 May 1839		
91.	Peter Ewald Beyer	10 December 1829 – 21 April 1841		
02.	Jørgen Peter Bech	6 July 1933 – 12 December 1840		
93.	Christian Georg Nathan David	0 December 1840 – 22 November 1843		
94.	Tage Algreen-Ussing	10 November 1841 – 16 March 1870		
05.	Hans Peter Hansen	22 November 1843 – 15 September 1881		
96.	Johan Henrik Kornbech	21 February 1861 – 12 January 1871		
87.	Alexander Christian Øst	16 January 1862 –		
98.	Jacob Christian Jacobsen			
99.	Gotfred Berggreen			
100.	Julius Andreas Blom	12 January 1871 – 30 September 1885		
101.	Christian Ludvig August Herforth	21 December 1762 – 30 September 1885		
102.	Christian Rimestad	30 September 1885 – 4 October 1894		
103.	Harald Hartvig Kayser	30 September 1885 – 10 October 1895		
104.	Harald Ludvig Vestergaard	1904 –		

- Knud Engelbreth Langberg
- Christian Hansen
- Jens Lauritzen
- Christian Ludvig Budtz
- Lauritz Rasmussen
- (1751–1770) Frederik Barfred
- (1784–1791) Jørgen Bech
- (1787–17893) Lars Larsen
- Andreas Collstrup
- Rasmus Kirketerp
- Knud Christensen
- Hans Peder Kofoed
- Peter Andresen
- J. D. Vogel
- Casper Friederich Fiedler
- Peter Rabe Holm

== See also ==
- Kreditkassen for Husejere i Kjøbenhavn
