= Kreditkassen =

Kreditkassen may refer to:

- Kreditkassen for Husejere i Kjøbenhavn, a mortgage credit institution in Denmark
- Christiania Bank, branded domestically as Kreditkassen, a bank in Norway
