= Hans Rudolph Saabye =

Hans Rudolph Saabye (1751 – 8 November 1817) was a Danish businessman. He succeeded Johann Ludvig Zinn as chair of Grosserer-Societetet in 1802. In 1792, he was appointed United States consul for the Port of Copenhagen.

== Early life and background ==
Saabye was born in Aarhus to Niels Nielsen Saabye (1718-1772) and Anna Barbara Sophia Fischer (1718-1798). His father was tenant/manager of (forpagter) of Vedø. from 1647 and Clausholm from 26 April 1754. His maternal grandfather Clemens Lauritzen Fischer was the proprietor of Øster Kejlstrup in Gødvad Parish. His sister Inger Nielsdatter Saabye (c. 1740–1810) married to Poul Marcussen, owner of Ørumgaard.

== Career ==
Saabye settled as a wholesale merchant in Copenhagen. In 1789, he partnered with Niels Ryberg, Christian Daniel Otte and Mørch as Niels Ryberg & Co. On 22 February 1802, he was elected as chair of Grosserer-Societetet.

== Titles and awards ==
On 5 August 1789, in a letter addressed to George Washington, Saabye offered his services as consul to the United States. In January 1792, Washington appointed him United States consul for the Port of Copenhagen.

In 1809. Saabye was created a Knight in the Order of the Dannebrog, In 1812, together with Erich Erichsen and Jeppe Prætorius, he was awarded the title of etatsråd in appreciation of the role that Grosserer-Societetet had played during the Napoleonic Wars.

== Personal life ==
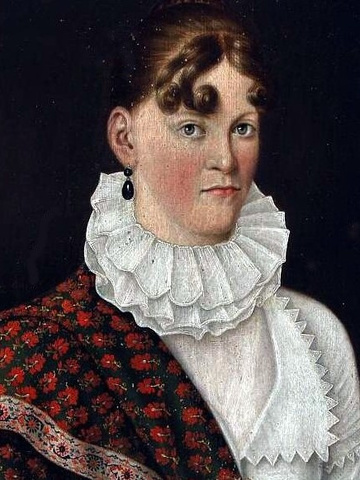
Saabye's daughter Jacobine Saabye.

Saabye married to Anne Nielsdatter Schou (1755-1812), daughter of Niels Jepsen Schou and Anne Bertelsdatter Ryberg. She was the niece of Niels Ryberg. Their daughter Jacobine Saabye (1783-1842) would later marry Detlev Magnus Adolf Ulrich, Count von Sperling (1786-1832).

Saabye owned Amaliegade 10 in Copenhagen (later replaced by Assurandørernes Hus) and the country house Rolighed in Ordrup. Rolighed was destroyed in a fire. The fire site was later acquired by his business partner Christian Daniel Otte. It was located at the site where Jacob Heinrich Moresco's country house Adelaide was later constructed.
