= C. S. Blachs Enke & Co. =

18th Century Danish shipping firm

C. S. Blachs (Blacks) Enke & Co. (C. S. Blachs (Black's) Widow & Co.) was a trading house and shipping company based in Copenhagen, Denmark. It was founded in 1727 and became one of the largest Danish shipping companies after it was taken on by Erich Erichsen in 1783. It struggled after the turn of the century and went bankrupt in 1833.

== History ==
The company was founded by Oluf Blach (1694-1767) in 1727. It traded on the Danish colonies, especially the Danish West Indies. Blach served as managing director of the General Trading Company from 1767.

After Blach's death in 1767, the company was continued by his son, Christen Schaarup Black (1737-1783). He established a partnership with Niels Ryberg in the 1760s, but it ended in 1775.

Black died just 46 years old in 1781. His widow, Johanne Black (1747-1800), married Erich Erichsen in 1783. The company was from then on registered as C. S. Blacks Enke & Co. Erich Erichsen was for a while in partnership with his brother, Peter Erichsen, who was married to Peter Applebye's granddaughter, Anna Agathe Nancy. Trade on the Danish West Indies was still the central part of the company's activities. It completed 32 expeditions to the Danish West Indies in the period from 1747 to 1807. Erichsen was, for a while, a member of the board of directors of the Danish Asiatic Company.

Several of the company's ships were captured by privateers during the English Wars. The company went bankrupt in 1833.

== Location ==
In 1807, Blach & Co. owned a warehouse at present-day Bådsmandsstræde 6/Overgaden neden Vandet 51s in Christianshavn and another warehouse at Christianshavns Voldgade 1-3/Overgaden oven Vandet 2 og 2 A.

== Fleet ==
- 1776 - Langen (ID=9783).
- 1778 - Johanne Maria (ID=9840), built for the company
- 1779 - Johanne (ID=13459).
- 1783 - Prins Carl af Hessen (ID=9330), purchased for the company of agent Erichsen
- 1783 - Haabet (ID=13463).
- 1784 - Fortuna (ID=13464).
- 1786 - Grev Reventlov (ID=10040), owned 1786-1790 and also seen as Agent Ericksen.
- 1786 - Magnus (ID=13458).
- 1788 - Europa (ID=9752), owned by the company.
- 1792 - Bellona (ID=13461).
- 1795 - Dronning Juliane Maria (ID=3882), purchased from Danish Asiatic Company. Burnt ub 1796.
- 1797 - Mathilda Maria (ID=11027). Sold after 1802.
- 1797 - Det Gode Haab (ID=13460).
- 1799 - Nanct (ID=13462).
- 1801 - Mariane (ID=11533).
- after 1817 - Henriette Louise (ID=6619), purchased from Duntzfelt between 1817 and 1831.
- 1824 - Antoinette (ID=3612), owned by the company.

=== 1828 fleet ===
In 1828, the company's fleet consisted of the following ships:

- Johanne Marie (ID=9840)
- Antoinette (ID=3612),
- Meridian (ID=3611)
- Henriette Louise (ID=6619)
