= Oluf Blach =

Danish merchant

Oluf Blach (12 January 1694 – 10 July 1767) was a Danish merchant. His son continued his trading house after his death. The company changed its name to C. S. Blacks Enke & Co. in 1783.

== Early life and education ==
Blach was born into a wealthy family of merchants in Aarhus. His parents were merchant Mogens Jensen Blach (c. 1653–1698) and Else Olufsdatter (c. 1663–1725). He was most likely an apprentice in Abraham Kløcker's trading house where he is known to have worked for a couple of years and whose step-daughter he married in 1723.

== Career ==
Blach was granted citizenship as a merchant on 3 November 1727. From 1729 to 1740, Blach, Jacob Severin and Rasmus Sternberg held a monopoly on trade on Northern Norway (then known as Finmarken). In 1763 he was appointed to managing director of the General Trade Company (Det almindelige handelskompagni). In 1764 he was appointed to the managing board of Kurantbanken. Blach was appointed kancelliråd in 1746, justitsråd in 1749 and etatsråd in 1755.

His trading company was passed on to his son Christian Schaarup Blach. For a while, it was in partnership with Niels Ryberg and later with Erich Erichsen.

== Personal life ==
Blach married Kløcker's step-daughter Birgitte Mangor (1699 – 17 January 1778) in the Church of Holmen on 17 November 1723. She was the daughter of city councilor and city builder (stadskonduktør) Elovius Mangor (c. 1662–1714) and Johanne Herforth (1681–1756). Her mother had married Abraham Klocker in 1719.
