= Nyhavn 35 =

Historic building in Copenhagen, Denmark

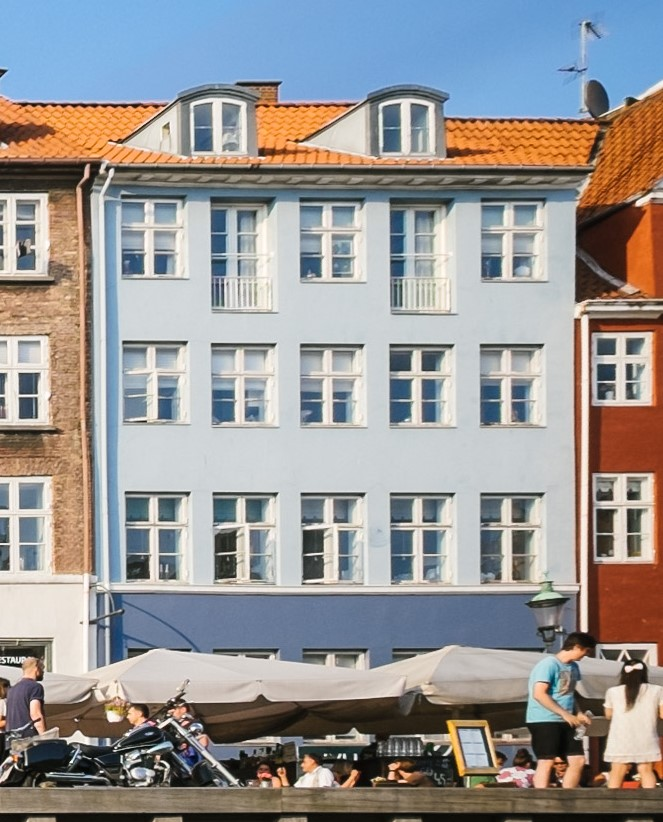
- The house seen from the other side of the canal
- Interactive map of the Nyhavn 35 area

General information
- Location: Copenhagen, Denmark
- Coordinates: 55°40′48.64″N 12°35′25.53″E
- Completed: c. 1700

Nyhavn 35 is a historic townhouse overlooking the Nyhavn Canal in central Copenhagen, Denmark. The building was listed in the Danish registry of protected buildings and places in 1945. Notable former residents include the businessman Jørgen Thomsen Bech and the composer Andreas Peter Berggreen.

== History ==
=== 17th and 18th centuries ===
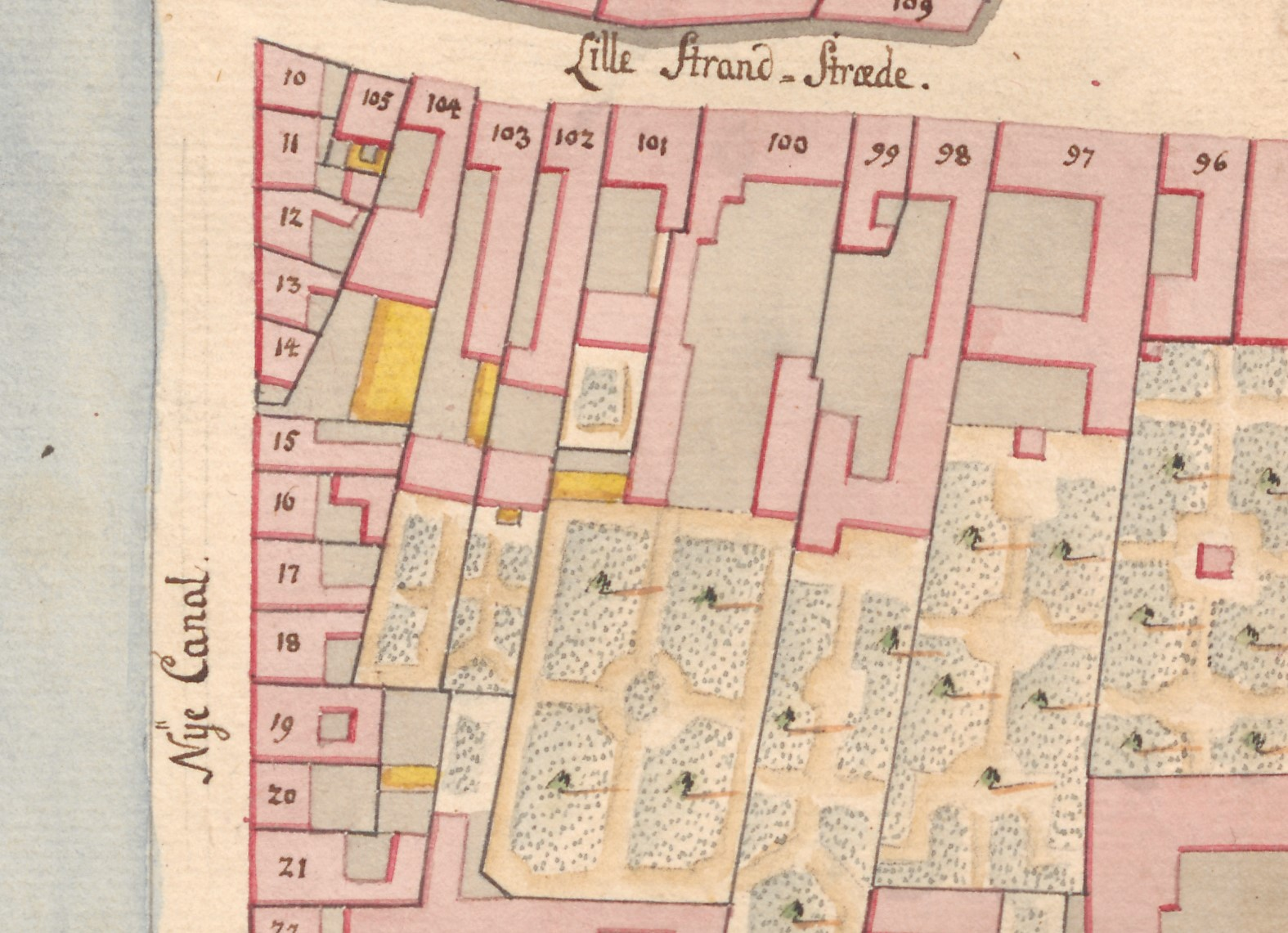
No. 18 seen on a detail from Christian Gedde's map of St. Ann's East Quarter, 1757

The property was listed in Copenhagen's first cadastre of 1689 as No. 13 in St. Ann's East Quarter and belonged to the widow of Niels Christensen Roskilde at that time. A two-storey building was constructed in around 1700. The building was known as "The Sun" (Solen) due to a red-painted relief of a sun above the main entrance.

The property was again listed as No. 18 in the new cadastre of 1756 and belonged to skibsmåler Peder Nielsen at that time.

=== Bech and Holbech ===
The property was later owned by Nicolai Jonge by whom it was let out to Jørgen Bech. He had until then dealt in human hair which was bought up in his native Jutland and sold to hairdressers and wigmakers in Copenhagen, but now established a new business dealing in tea, porcelain and other Oriental products. His shop occupied the ground floor of the building while he and his first wife lived on the first floor. Their daughter Ane Marie was born in 1757. Another daughter, Marie Helene, who was born in 1758, died just four months old in February 1769. On 11 June 1759, Bech purchased the house from Nicolai Jonge for 3,000 rigsdaler.

In August 1767, Bech lost his wife. On 30 August 1775, Ane Maria Bech married to merchant Jens Holbech (1748–1814). In conjunction with the wedding, Bech bought a new property around the corner at Toldbodgade 15 and presented the old one to his son-in-law. The building was heightened with one story in 1785. Jens and Ane Marie Holbech resided in the building with their two children (aged two and four) at the 1787 census. The other members of the households were 24-year-old Anna Licht, two employees in the porcelain business (one of them an apprentice) and two maids. Ane Maria Holbech died in 1795. At the 1801 census, Jens Holbech resided in the building with his three children (aged 13 to 18), two employees in his wholesale business, a housekeeper and a maid.

Holbech's property was again listed as No. 18 in the new cadastre of 1806. Shortly thereafter, he sold it and bought the brewery four houses down the street at No. 22 (now Nyhavn 43).

=== 1834 census ===
At the time of the 1834 census, No 18 was home to three households. Axel Christian Black and Frederikke Margarethe Hedevig Black (née Søegaard), a skipper and a tea and porcelain merchant, respectively, resided on the ground floor with their three children (aged 14 to 18) and a maid. Erik Rasmus Peter Eskildsen and Peter Duus resided on the first floor. Eskildsen worked for the Danish Admiralty with the title of krigsassessor. Duus lived from his means. Andreas Peter Berggreen, a music teacher and composer, resided on the second floor with his wife Dorothea Frederikke Berggreen (née Wettergreen), their two children (aged one and five) and one maid.

The building was again heightened with one storey in 1855. Moritz Levy (1824–1892), who would later become manager of the Bank of Denmark, lived in the building in 1853.

=== Beverlin Christian Reiersen ===
The property was later acquired by Beverlin Christian Reiersen (1792–1847). At the previous census, in 1834, he had resided on the ground floor of Nyhavn 21.

The property was again home to 23 residents in five households at the 1840 census. B. C. Reiersen, a businessman (grosserer), resided on the first floor with a male servant. C. Schmidt, a customs official, resided on the second floor with his wife M. C. Schmidt, three of their children (aged 23 to 28), a maid and two lodgers. M. F. Ginderup, a man with a pension, resided on the third floor with his wife T. E. Ginderup and their two sons (aged 16 and 19). The elder of the two sons was at sea with a merchant ship when the census took place (1 February). J. H. D. Kramer, a baker and flour retailer, resided on the ground floor with his wife D. C. Kramer, their foster daughters (aged 14 and 18), one male servant and one maid. Niels Petersen, a barkeeper, resided in the basement with his wife Maria Petersen and their four-year-old daughter.

Reiersen's property was home to 24 residents in five at the 1845 census. Reiersen still resided in one of the first-floor apartments with one maid. F. D. Thaae. a merchant trading in Iceland, resided in the building with his wife C. M. Biermann, their five children (aged five to 14) and one maid. J. H. Kramer, now listed as a ryebread baker, resided on the ground floor with his wife D. C. Hanberg, two foster daughters (aged 19 and 23), one male servant and one maid. Peter Petersen, a new barkeeper, resided in the basement with Maria Pallesen, their nine-year-old son and one maid.

Reiersen still lived in the building at the time of his death on 25 December 1847.

=== 1850 census ===
The property was again home to four households at the 1850 census. The ryebread baker J.H.D. Kramer still resided on the ground floor with his wife Dorthe Cathrine Kramer and two maids. Helene Lorenzen, widow of P. H. Lorenzen, resided on the first floor with her two children (aged 13 and 19), one maid and the lodger Thorvald Klein. C. L. Bruun, a court official (kongelig kammerfourer og fuldmægtig), resided on the second floor. Jacob Hansen, a new barkeeper, resided in the basement with his wife Maria Margrete Hansen and their two daughters (aged three and seven).

=== 1880 census ===
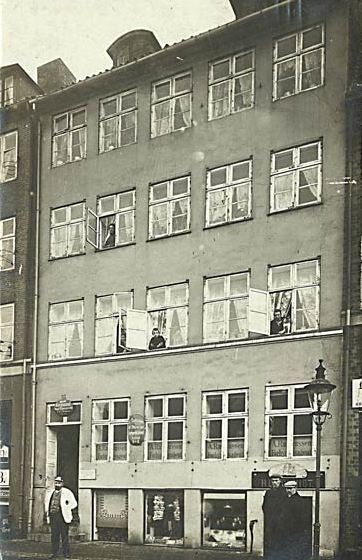
Nyhavn 35 in the 1900s

The property was home to 17 residents at the 1880 census. Jørgen Christoffer Kryger, a 44-year-old man who owned the building, resided on the second floor with his sister Hanne Kryger. Johannes Martensen Kragh, a medical doctor (widower), resided on the first floor with his three children (aged six to nine), a housekeeper and a maid. Oline Laurine Agusta Aminde, a female tailor, resided on the third floor with her 13-year-old daughter and one maid. Christian Neve, a hotelier, resided on the ground floor with his wife Marie Neve and their 16-year-old foster daughter. Jens Mikkelsen Winther, a barkeeper, resided in the basement with his wife Karen Johanne Winther and one maid.

== Architecture ==
The building is four storeys tall and five bays wide.

== Today ==
The building is one of few buildings on the sunny side of Nyhavn that does not have a restaurant or café at street level.
