= Warburg House =

Historic building in Copenhagen, Denmark

- Warburgs Hus
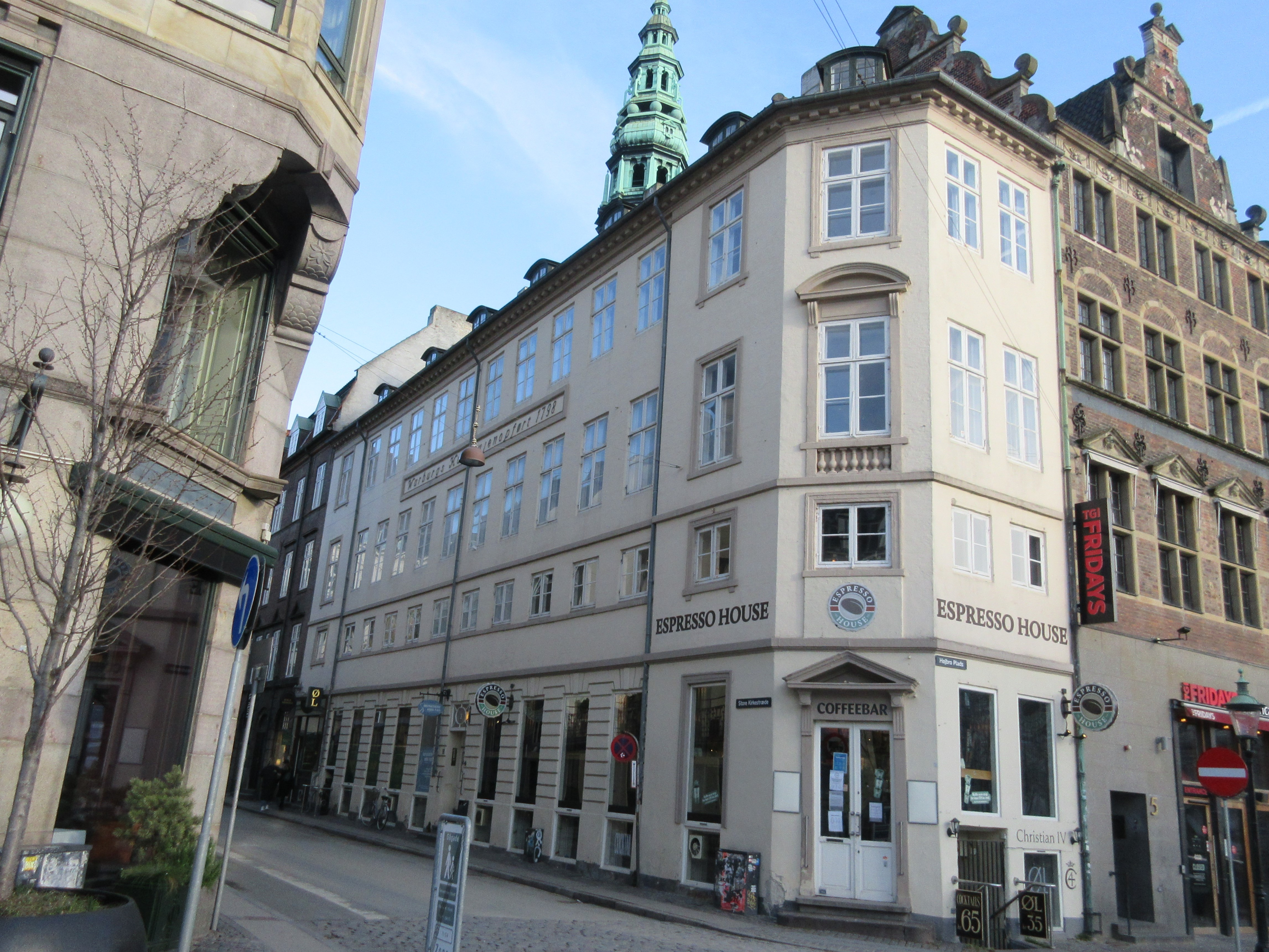
- Interactive map of the Warburg House area

General information
- Architectural style: Neoclassical
- Location: Copenhagen, Denmark
- Coordinates: 55°40′43.39″N 12°34′48.29″E
- Completed: 1799
- Owner: Dreyers Fond

The Warburg House (Danish: Warburgs Gård) is a historic property located at the corner of Sag: Store Kirkestræde (No, 3) and Højbro Plads (No. 3) in the Old Town on Copenhagen, Denmark. The building was listed on the Danish registry of protected buildings and places in 1964. Toga Vinstue (Store Kirkestræde 3), a lunch restaurant and bar, is known as a popular meetingplace for politicians journalists and other people with an interest in politics.

== History ==
=== Early history ===
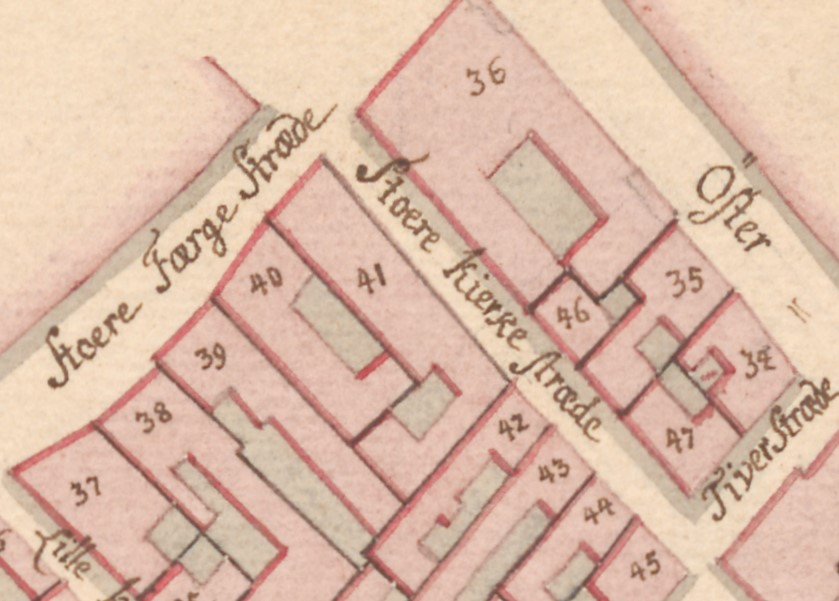
No. 41 seen on a detail from Christian Gedde's map of the East Quarter, 1757.

The property was listed in Copenhagen's first cadastre of 1689 as No. 36 in the city's East Quarter. It was owned by merchant Johan Herman Skrøder at that time. The property was listed in the new cadastre of 1756 as No. 41 in East Quarter. It was used as a naval hospital at that time.

=== Warburg family ===
A member of the German-Jewish Warburg family was called to Denmark by Christian VI to open a stockings factory in 1730. Lion Warburg (1712-1784) and Josef Wessely (1712-1788) opened a stockings shop at the corner of Store Kirkestræde and Store Færgestræde in 1746. In 1752, they also established a stockings factory in Store Færgestræde. The company was later continued by Arenhold Leonhard Warburg (1754-1810).

The property was home to 27 residents in two households at the 1787 census. Aron Warburg resided in the building with his wife Hinriette Wesly, their six children (aged one to eight), his mother Rebeche Warburg, his paternal aunt Ester Warburg, his nephew Elle Warburg, the instructor Jacob Con and four maids. Josep Moses Wesely, his partner in the stockings factory, resided in the building with his sons Moses and Friederich Wesely, two maids and six workers at the factory.

The buildings in Store Færgestræde were destroyed in the Copenhagen Fire of 1795. The present building on the site was constructed in 1798-1799.

The property was again home to two households at the 1801 census. Aron Levin Warburg resided in his building with his new wife Aron Levin Warburg, five children from his first marriage (aged 13 to 20), his mother, a clerk and two maids. The other household consisted of student Casper Herman Bentzen, his wife Mette Caroline Bentzen, one male, one maid, organist Christoph Ernst Friedrich Weyse, lodger Thomas Buntzen (medicine student), lodger Olaus Kellermann (clerk), lodger Peter Johan Wilhelm Kellermann, housekeeper Marie Christiane Berg, tobacco spinner Hendrich Langemarck and Langemarck's 11-year-old apprentice Johan Peter Hall.

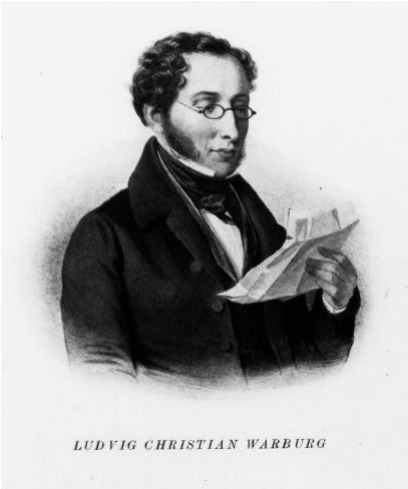
Ludvig Christian Warburg

Warburg's property was listed in the new cadastre of 1806 as No. 38 in the city's East Quarter. The company was after his death in 1810 continued by his son Ludvig Christian Warburg (1786-1836).

Ludvig Warburg's son Christian Arenholt Warburg (1813-1895) was later made a partner and the firm was from then on known as L. C. Warburg & Søn. It was in 1885 acquired by C. T. Kjølbye (1827-1898).

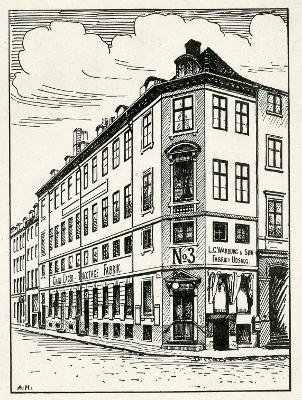
The building seen on an advert for L. C. Warburg & Søn created by the artist Axel Hou.

The property was home to 29 residents in four households at the 1840 census. Christian Arnhold Warburg, a stockings manufacturer, resided on the first floor with two of his sisters, four of his brothers, two paternal aunts, three clerks (employees), a courier (employee), a female cook, one male servant and one maid. Christian Bruhn, who was employed at the Royal Danish Theatre, resided on the second floor with his wife Engel Marie Bruhn (née Heibergm 1798-1867)m his niece Sophie Rebecca Bruhn, 21-year-old actress Henriette Andersen and one maid. Hans Ditlev Lubenberg, an assistant at Tal-Æptteriet and captain in the Civilian Artillery, resided on the ground floor with his wife Caroline Kirstine Lubenberg (née Hoffmann) and their two daughters (aged 12 and 18). Dines Rasmussen, a beer seller (øltapper), resided in the basement with his wife Gjertrud Rasmussen født Christensen, their two-year-old son and one maid.

In 1899 it changed hands again when it was acquired by Michael Johansen (1872-1944). The shop was after his death in 1944 continued by his widow Magda Johansen (born 1879) and son Erling Johansen (born 1914). It closed in 1952.

Organist and composer C. E. F. Weyse (1774-1842) was a resident in the building from 1804 to 1814. He was hired for the position as organist at the Church of Our Lady in 1805.

== Architecture ==
The building has two bays facing Højbro plads, 12 bays facing Store Kirkestræde and a canted corner bay. The two outer bays towards Store Kirkestræde are slightly projecting risalits.

== Today ==
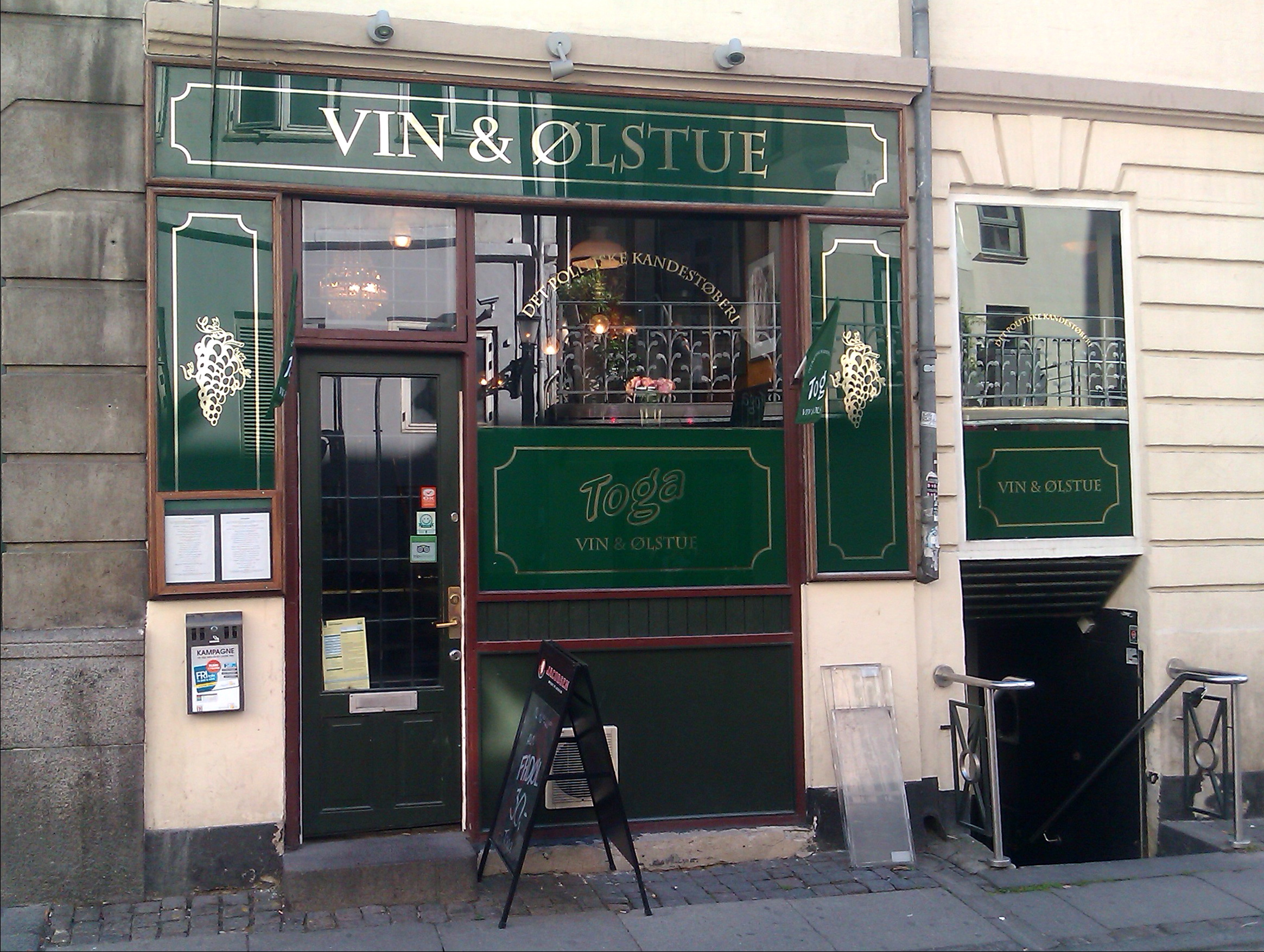
Toga Vinstue

The Warburg House was in October 2012 acquired by Dreyers Fond. Tenants include Toga Vinstue (Store Kirkestræde 3), an Espresso House (Højbro Plads 3) and the cocktail bar Kant (Højbro Plads 3).

Toga Vinstue, a lunch restaurant and bar, is known as a popular meetingplace for young and old politicians, journalists and other people with an interest in politics. It is often used as a venue for political meetings or live music, often with politicians as guest bartenders or performers.

== See also ==
- L. C. Warburg & Søn
