= Nyhavn 57 =

Historic building in Copenhagen, Denmark

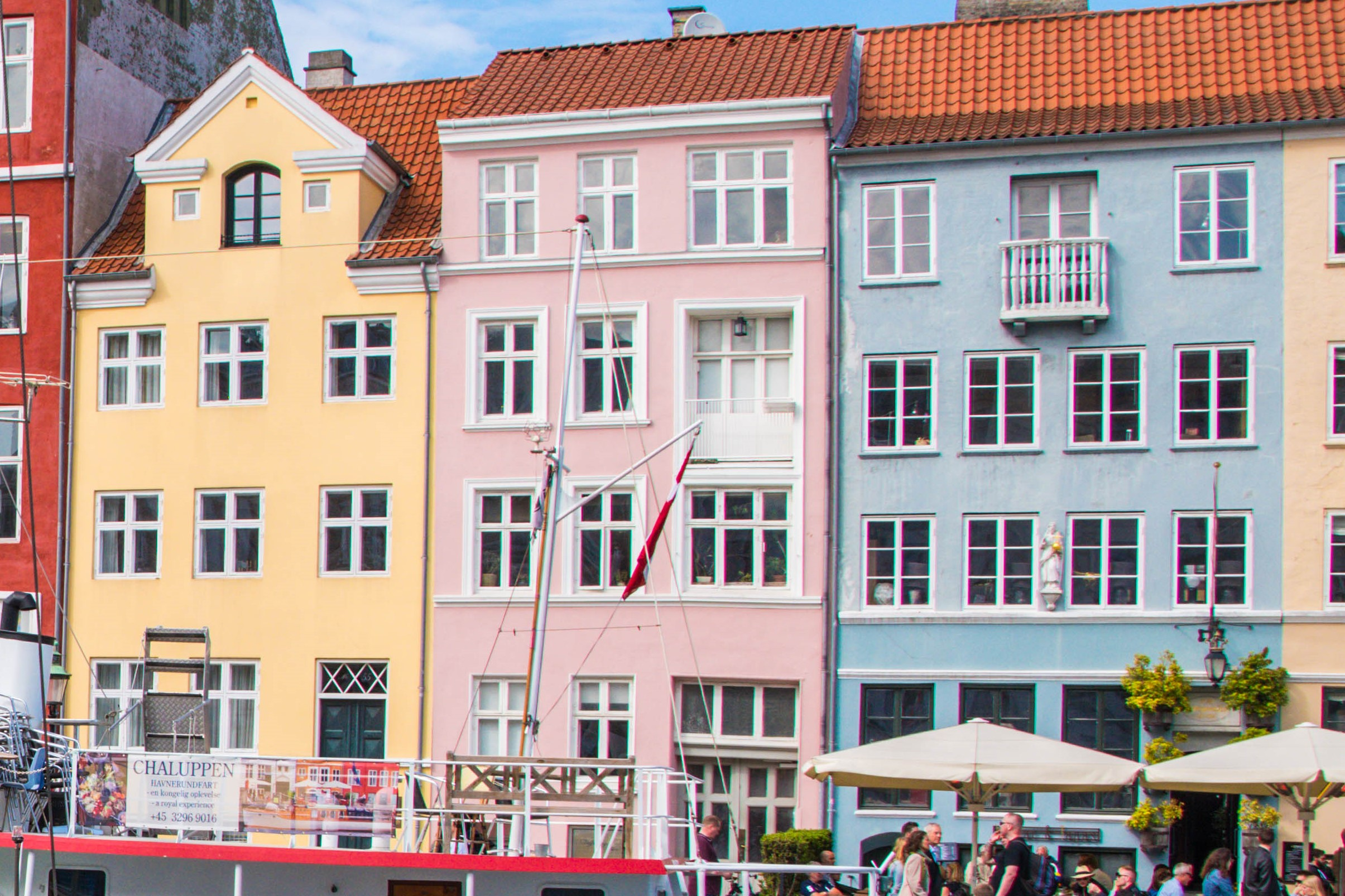
- Interactive map of the Nyhavn 57 area

General information
- Location: Copenhagen, Denmark
- Coordinates: 55°40′46.92″N 12°35′31.96″E
- Completed: 1684-1692

Nyhavn 57 was a late 17th-century building overlooking the Nyhavn Canal in central Copenhagen, Denmark. The property was listed in the Danish registry of protected buildings and places in 1945. Notable former residents include the artist Heinrich Gustav Ferdinand Holm and D/S Norden founder Mads Christian Holm.

== Architecture ==
Nyhavn 57 is constructed with three storeys over a walk-out basement. The building is just three bays wide.
