= Lille Strandstræde 20 =

Building in Copenhagen, Denmark

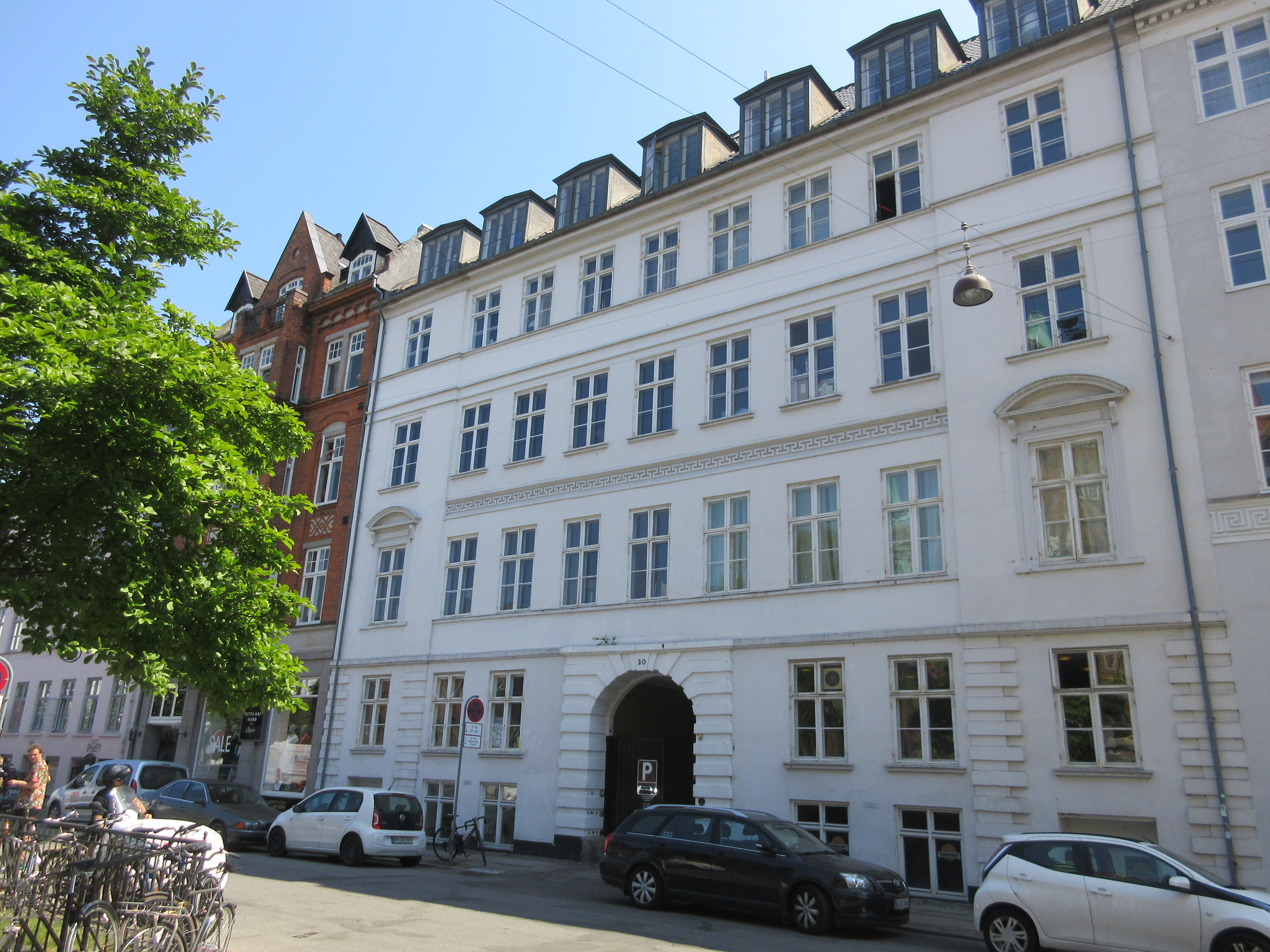
- Interactive map of the Lille Strandstræde 20 area

General information
- Architectural style: Neoclassical
- Location: Copenhagen, Denmark
- Coordinates: 55°40′52.36″N 12°35′24.79″E
- Completed: 1795

Lille Strandstræde 20 is a Neoclassical property located off Sankt Annæ Plads in central Copenhagen, Denmark. Built in 1797 and heightened with one storey in 1854–55, it was for many years home to cartwright Henry Fife's workshop. The four-winged complex was listed in the Danish registry of protected buildings and places in 1918.

== Architecture ==
The building is in four stories over a raised cellar. The nine-bay facade is rendered white with rusticated finishing on the ground floor. A gateway is located in the central bay and the two outer bays. The windows in the two slightly projecting outer bays are topped by rounded pediments on the first floor and the seven central windows are topped by a frieze. The rook features seven dormer windows.

The gateway opens to a small courtyard. The two perpendicular side wings are newer than the front wing but it is not known exactly when they were built. The rear wing was built in 1858.
