= Kvæsthusgade 1 =

Street in Copenhagen

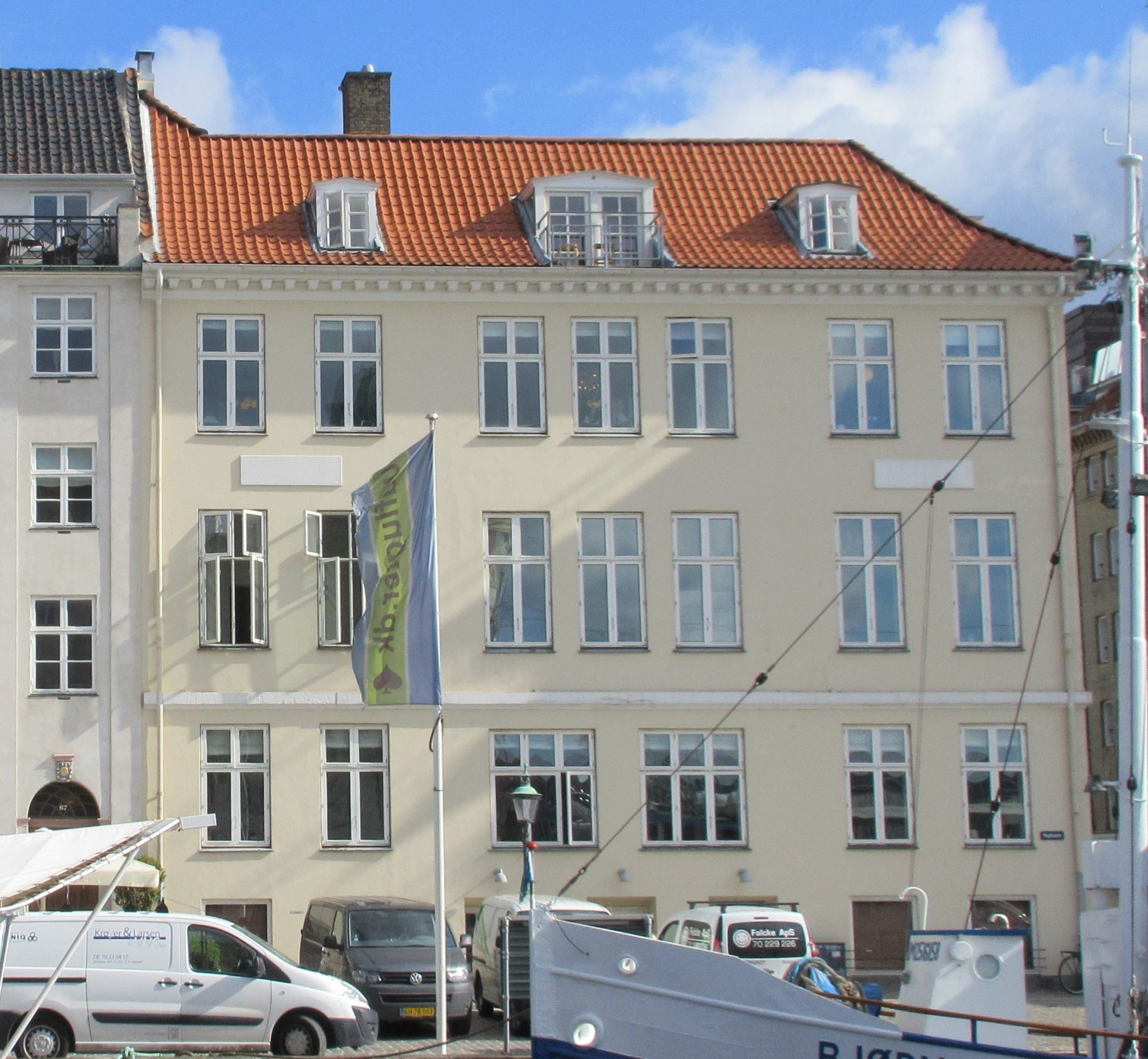
- Interactive map of the Kvæsthusgade 1 area

General information
- Location: Copenhagen, Denmark
- Coordinates: 55°40′46.09″N 12°35′35.12″E
- Completed: 1880s

Kvæsthusgade 1, also known as Nyhavn 69, is a three-storey building situated at the corner of Nyhavn and Kvæsthusgade. A memorial featuring a bust of a diver wearing a diving helmet commemorates that Em. Z. Svitzer's Bjernings-Enterprise, a salvage company founded by Emil Zeuthen Svitzer back in 1833, was once headquartered in the building. Notable former residents include the actress Magda von Dolcke.

== Architecture ==
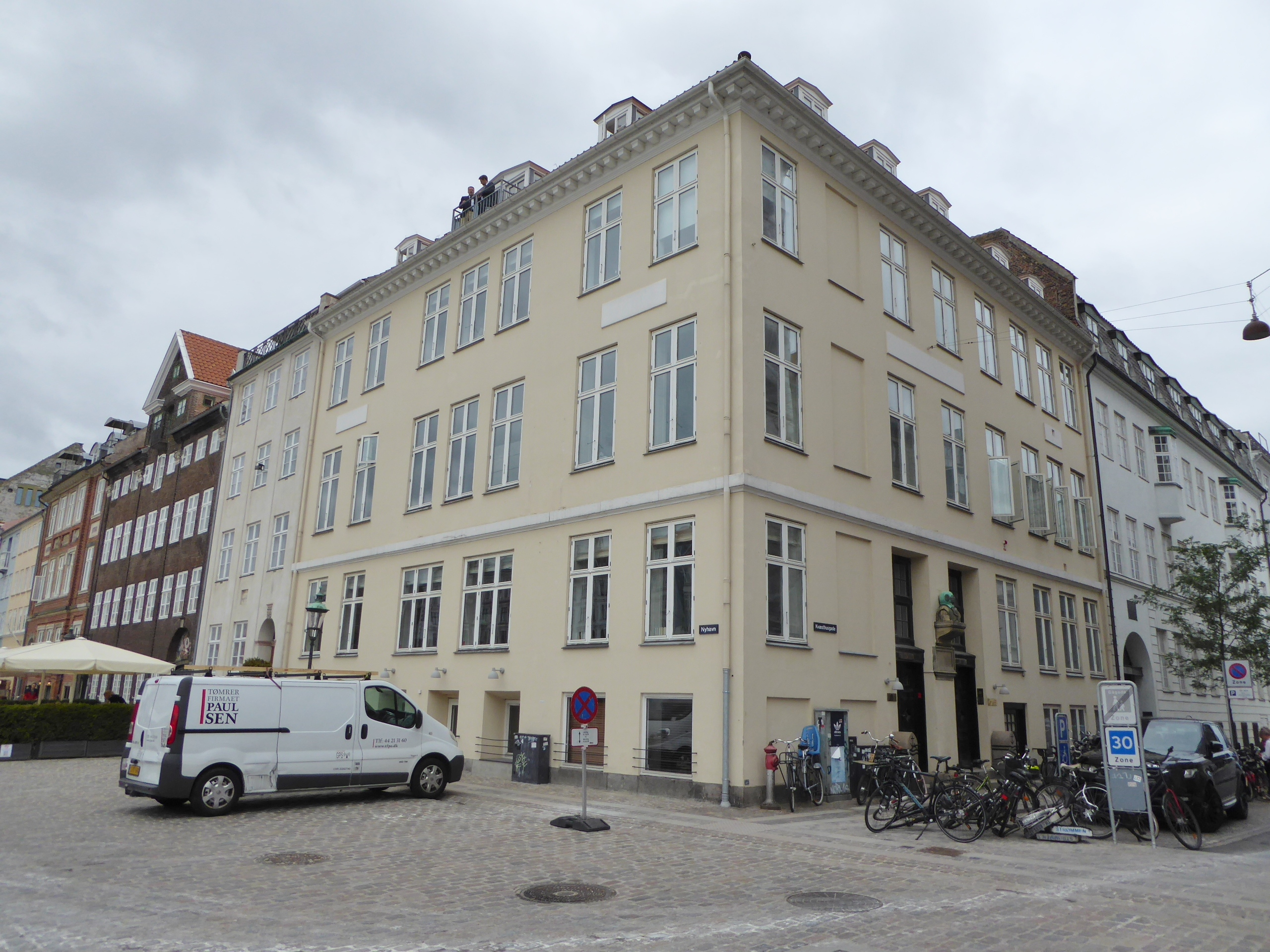
The building

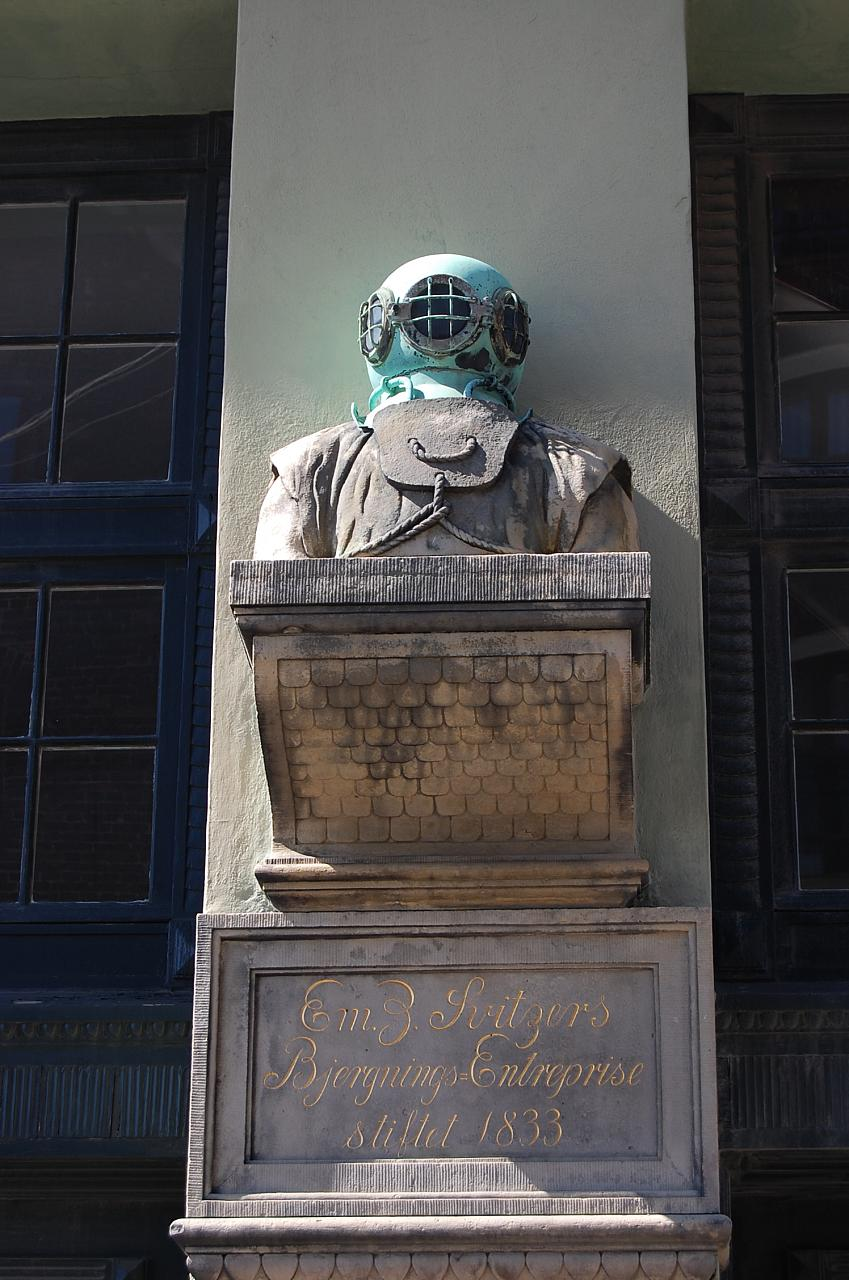
The Svitzer memorial

Kvæsthusgade 1 is a corner building constructed with three storeys over a walk-out basement, with an eight-bay-long facade towards Kvæsthusgade and a seven-bay-long facade towards the canal. The plastered facade is finished with a belt course above the ground floor and a dentillated cornice. Two balconies, in front of the three central windows of the first and second floor, on the facade towards Nyhavn, have been removed. The main entrance of the building is located in the second bay from the left towards Kvæsthusgade. A tall gateway in the third bay towards the same street provinces access to the central courtyard.

=== Svitzer memorial ===
Between the main entrance and the gate is a memorial featuring a bust of a diver wearing a diving helmet.
