= Verrayon House =

Townhouse in central Copenhagen, Denmark

- Verrayons Gård
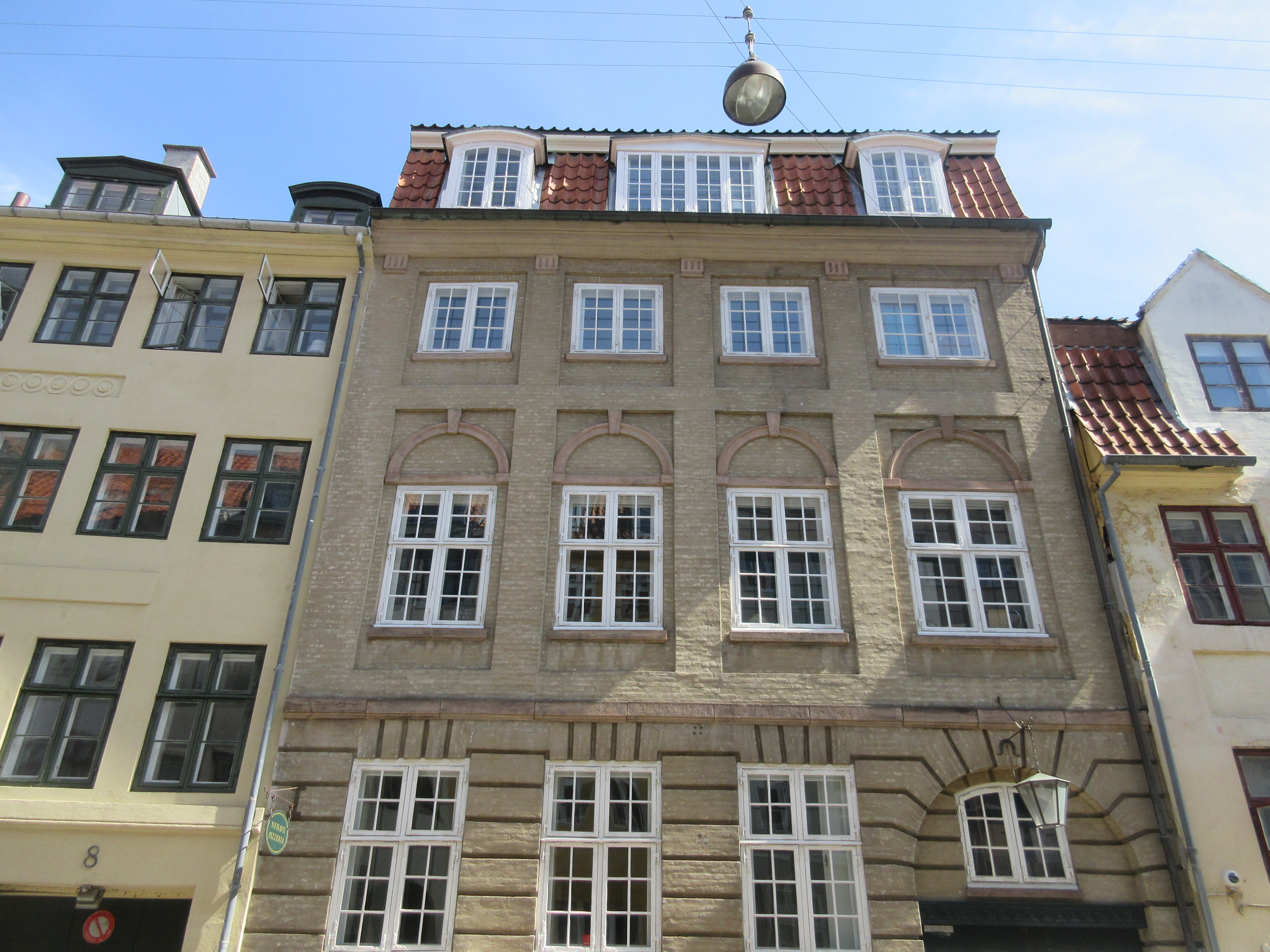
- The Verrayon House in August 2024.
- Interactive map of the Verrayon House area

General information
- Architectural style: Rococo
- Location: Copenhagen. Denmark
- Coordinates: 55°40′50.15″N 12°35′22.46″E
- Completed: 1769

Design and construction
- Architect: Nicolasi Wigtved

The Verrayon House (Danish: Verrayons Gård)is a Rococo, bourgeoisie townhouse located at Lille Strandstræde 6 in central Copenhagen, Denmark. It was listed by the Danish Heritage Agency in the Danish national registry of protected buildings in 1943.

== Architecture ==
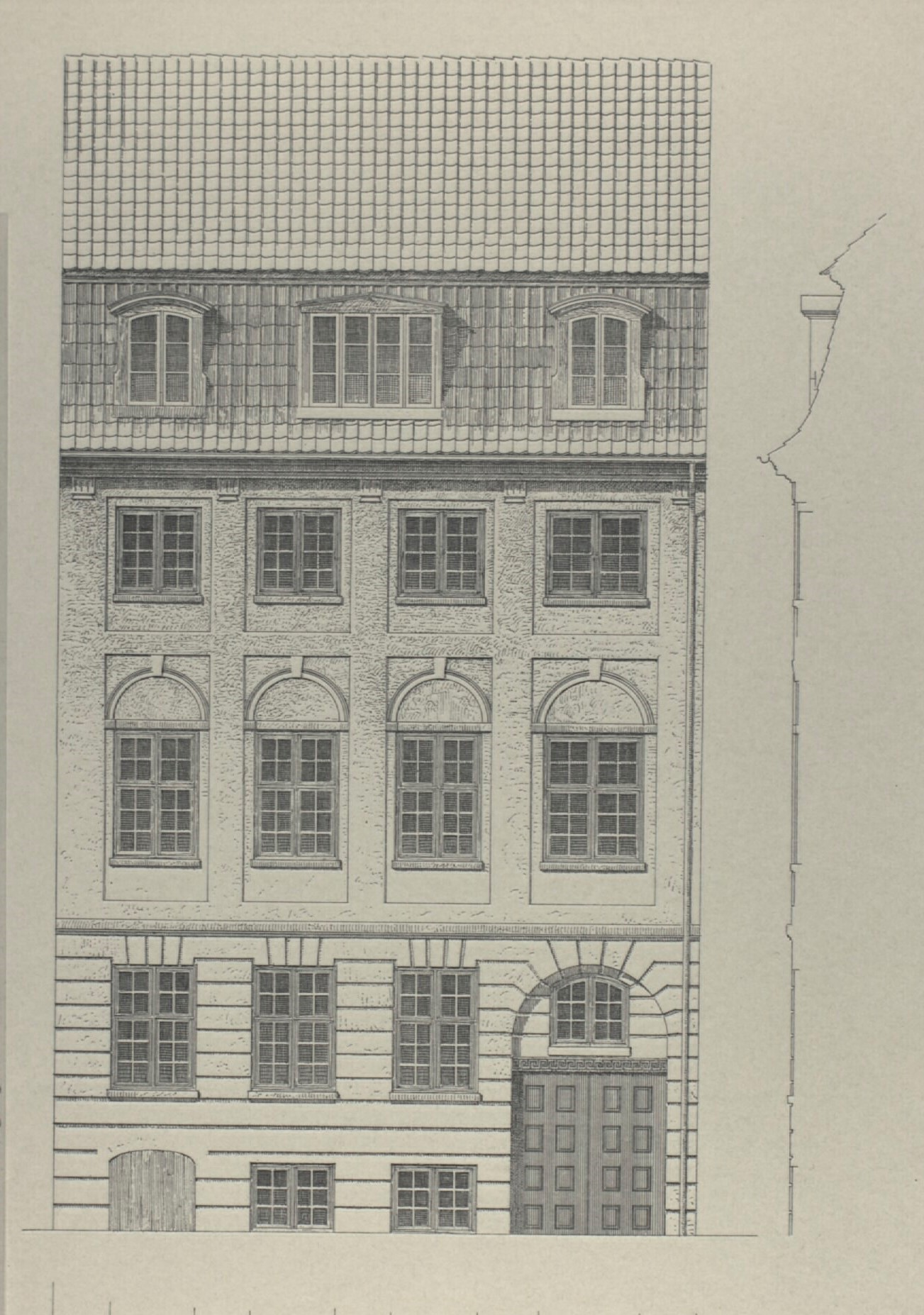
Facade drawing by architect Julius Smith

The building is four bays wide and consists of three storeys, Mansard roof and cellar. The windows are placed in slightly recessed sections. Decorative elements include demi-circular (en plein cintre) blind arches are found above the windows of the bel étage. Corbels support the main cornice.
