= Matthias Hansen House =

Building in Copenhagen, Denmark

- Mathias Hansens Gård
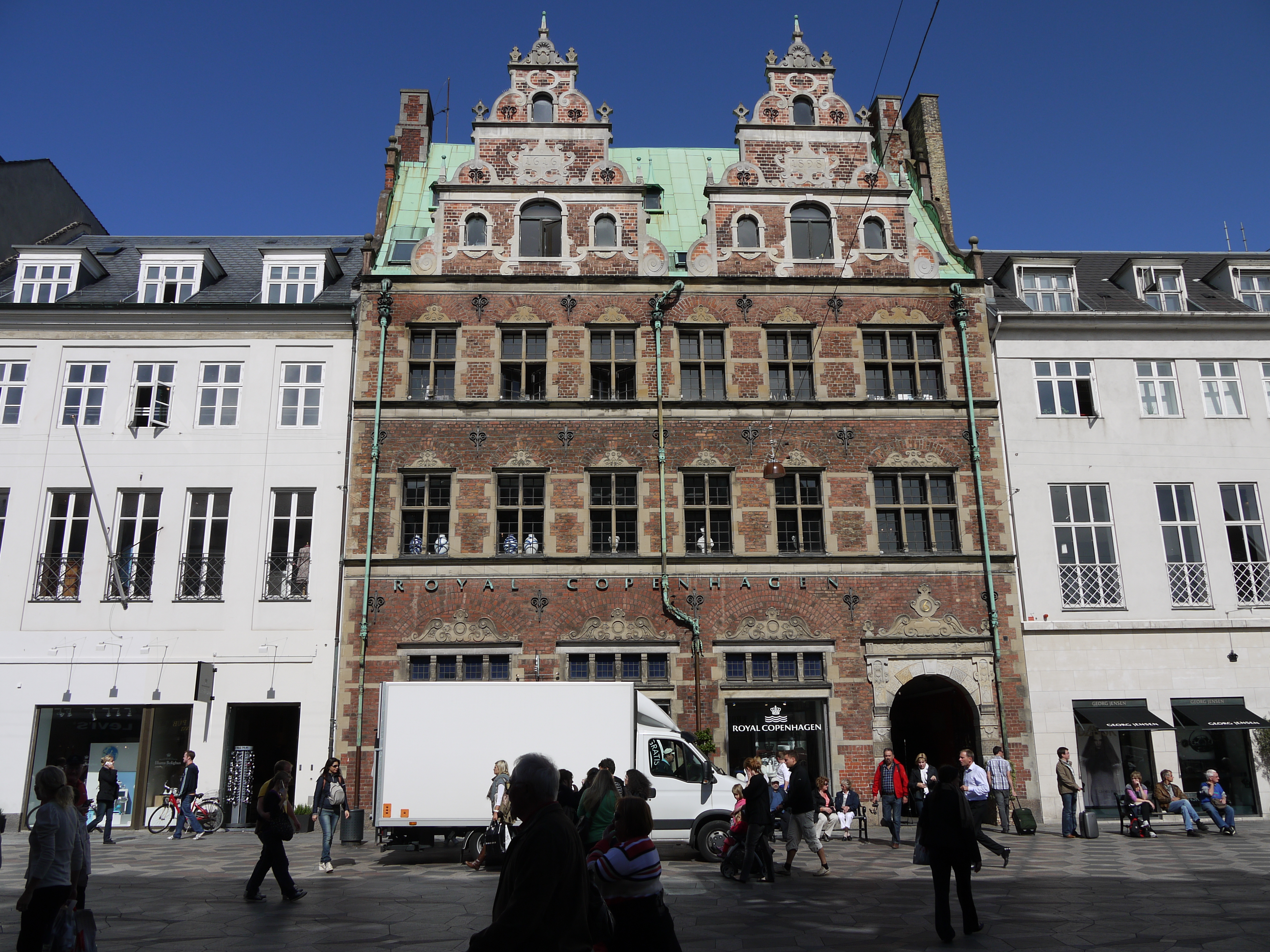
- Matthias Hansen House at Amagertorv
- Interactive map of the Matthias Hansen House area

General information
- Architectural style: Renaissance
- Location: Amagertorv, Copenhagen, Denmark
- Coordinates: 55°40′44.17″N 12°34′44.56″E
- Completed: 1616

The Matthias Hansen House (Danish: Matthias Hansens Gård), formerly also known as the Schoustrup House (Danish: Schoustrups Gård), is a Renaissance-style townhouse on Amagertorv (No. 6) in central Copenhagen, Denmark. Built in 1616, it is one of few buildings of its kind which survived the Copenhagen Fires of 1728 and 1795. The building is now home to a flagship store for the Royal Copenhagen porcelain factory.

== History ==
=== 17th century ===
The house was built in 1616 for Matthias Hansen, who was a member of the city council and later served as mayor of Copenhagen from 1622 until his death in 1626. Hansen's daughter, Kirsten Madsdatter, was one of Christian IV's mistresses and mother of Christian Ulrik Gyldenløve. Later residents include the composer Emil Hartmann, who lived there first in 1846 and again in 1852.

Marie Fuiren acquired the building in 1677. She was the daughter of Archbishop Hans Svane. Her property was listed in Copenhagen's first cadastre of 1689 as No. 4 in Frimand's Quarter. In 1693, it passed to their daughters, Anne Margrethe and Søster Svane, who were both widows at that time. Anne Margrethe Svane was the daughter of city doctor (stadsphysicus) Jens Foss. Søster Svane was the widow of bishop Hans Bagger.

=== 18th century ===
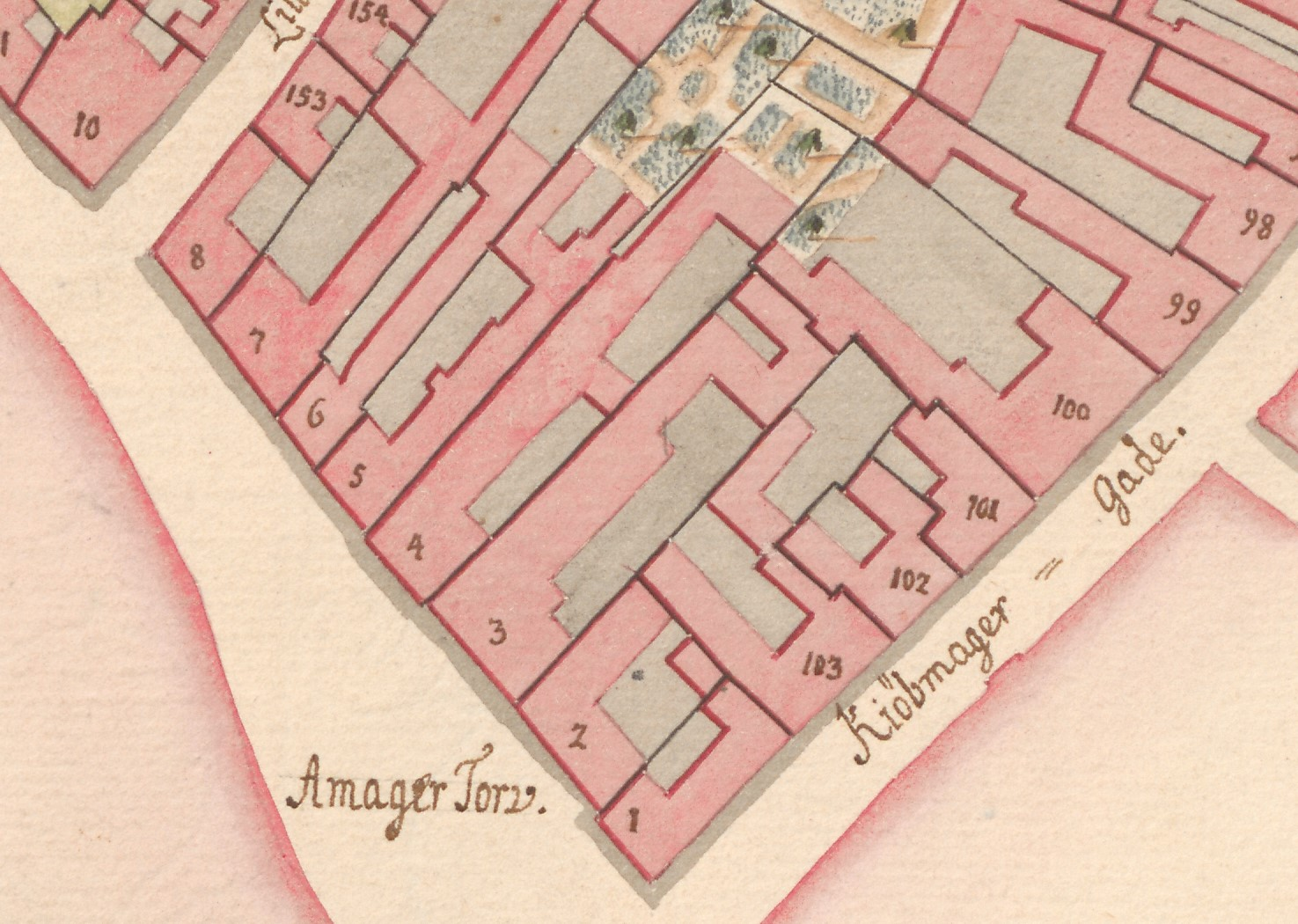
No. 3 seen in a detail from Christian Gedde's map of Frimand's Quarter

The next owner of the property was wine merchant Johan Sohl. He was a member of the Council of 32 Men. On his death in 1727 it was sold to Andreas Matthiesen and partners. The next owner was Johan Henrik Syling, a brother-in-law of Johan Sohl. This was one of very few buildings in the area to survive the Copenhagen Fire of 1728.

Privy Councillor Otto von Blom acquired the building in 1731. In 1738, it was acquired by Anna Sophie Schack.

=== Klauman family, 1740–1873 ===
Businessman and bank commissioner Gregorius Klauman acquired the property in 1740. He was the second president of the Grosserer-Societetet as well as one of the first directors of the Danish Asiatic Company. He also owned the country house Aggershvile in Skodsborg on the coast north of the city.

After his death in 1752 it passed to his son, Knud Gregorius de Klauman, who served as mayor of Copenhagen. His property was listed in the new cadastre of 1756 as No. 3 in Frimand's Quarter.

=== Christian Hansen, 1763–1795 ===
In 1763, Jkauman's widow Ulrikke Sophie de Klauman sold the property to wholesale merchant Christian Hansen.

The property was home to 31 residents in five households at the 1787 census. The owner resided in the building with his wife Mariane Valeue, their four-year-old daughter Charlotte Hansen, three office clerks, a coachman, caretaker, a female cook, a nanny and a maid. Christian Albrecht Fabricius (1734–1715), General Administrator of Tal-Lotteriet, resided in the building with his wife Margretha Friderica Sckreek, their three children (aged eight to 17), a female cook, a male servant and a maid. Johan Henrich Meincke, another employee at Tal-Lotteriet, resided in the building with his wife Marie Tronsen and one maid. Rasmus Hansen West, a fishmonger, resided in the building with his wife Christiana Christen Datter and their 19-year-old daughter. Christian Stavanger, a greengrocer, resided in the building with his wife Ellen Kirstine, their four-year-old daughter, his 76-year-old mother and one maid.

=== Schoustrup family, 1795–1872 ===
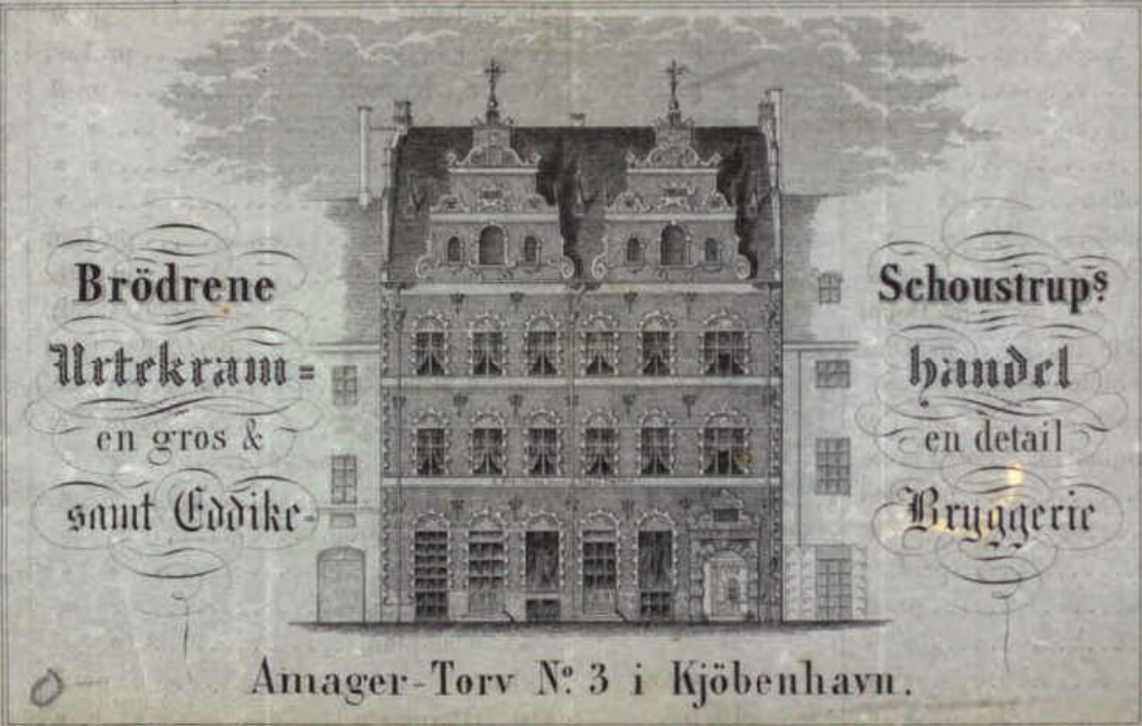
Advert for the Schoustrup Brothers

Jens Schoustrup acquired the building in 1795. His old property in Vestergade had just been destroyed in the Copenhagen Fire of 1795. He established a vinegar manufactory in the building in 1797. His property was again listed in the new cadastre of 1806 as No. 3 in Frimand's Quarter.

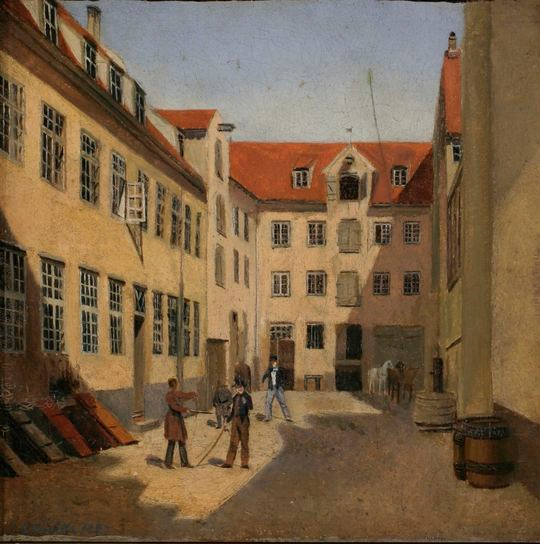
The courtyard, painted by Sally Henriques in 1848

The property was home to 32 residents in five households at the 1801 census. Jens Schoustrup resided in the building with his wife Anne Kirstine Horn, their four children (aged eight to 15), three employees, three male servants and two maids. Corfitz Fischer, a board member of the Royal Danish Mail (Deputeret i Post Amtet), resided in the building with his wife Cathrine Sønderborg, his sister-in-law Cathrine Sønderborg and two maids. Christen Hansen, the former, now-retired owner, resided in the building with his wife Mariane Waleur and one maid. Jon Kinderling, an inspector at Klæde Oplaget (textile storage), resided in the building with his wife Friderica Stetzer and one maid. Niels Bolsmann, a fishmonger, resided in the building with his wife Cecilia Bentsen, their two children (aged two and four), a maid and a caretaker.

On 27 January 1809, Schoustrup purchased the country house Oliegren on Amager as a purely speculative investment. On 4 February 1812, he sold most of the Oliegren estate to Jacob Holm. He only kept a small house on a 1790 square alen lot.

In 1814, Schoustrup ceded the property to his sons Peter and Johan Henrik Schoustrup. Peter's death in 1717 left Johan as the sole owner of the enterprise. Shortly prior to his own death, in 1844, he chose to cede it to his eldest son Peter Jacob Schoustrup.

=== Hafnia ===
The insurance company Hafnia acquired the building in 1872 and made it their headquarters. Architect Hans Jørgen Holm refurbished the building in 1898 and a café designed by Thorvald Bindesbøll opened on the ground floor the following year.

=== Royal porcelain factory ===
In 1912, Hafnia relocated to a new building on the corner of Holmens Kanal and Holbergsgade in Gammelholm. The building on Amagertorv was then taken over by the porcelain manufacturer Aluminia, which was merged with Royal Copenhagen in 1962.

== Architecture ==
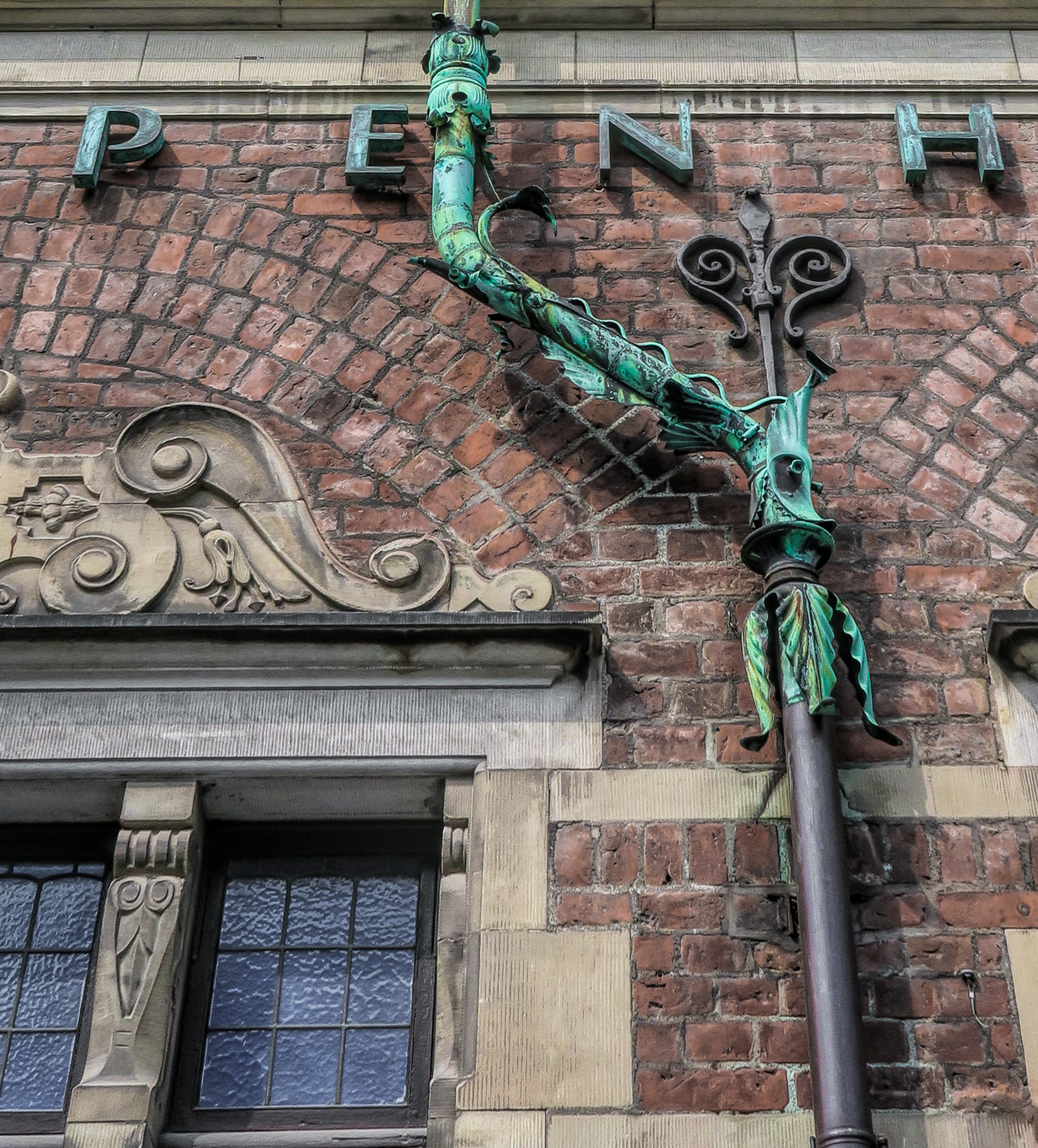
Dragon-headed drainage at No. 6

The building consists of three storeys and a cellar and stands in blank red brick with sandstone decorations. The facade is six bays wide and topped by a double Dutch gable. The gateway opens to a courtyard space which affords access to a rear wing and a connecting wing. The octagonal staircase tower in the courtyard is a reconstruction of a staircase tower which was demolished in 1731.

== List of owners ==
- 1616–1628: Matthias Hansen
- 1628–ca. 1660: Ingeborg Leiel Frederiksdatter (widow)
- ca. 1660–1663: Hans Matthiassen Mechlenburg (son)
- 1663–1666: Margrethe Rosenmeyer Henriksdatter (widow)
- 1666–1670: Ingeborg Margrethe Mechlenburg, married to Royal Commissioner (kgl. kommissarius) Frants Müller from Gundetved, who became owner through marriage
- 1670–1677: Diderik Schult, Privy Councillor (gehejmeråd), executive secretary (oversekretær) for the Danish chancellery, etc.
- 1677–1677: Gerhard Schrøder, nephew of Peder Schumacher Griffenfeld's mother
- 1677–1693: Marie Fuiren, widow of Archbishop Hans Svane
- 1693–unknown: Anne Margrethe Svane (daughter), widow of council advisor (kancelliråd) and city doctor (stadsfysikus) Jens Foss (died 1687), and Søster Svane (daughter), widow of bishop Hans Bagger
- unknown–1727: Johan Sohl, wine merchant, one of the assembly of 32 Men mentioned in Ludvig Holberg's comedy Den vægelsindede. He was married to a sister of the later-mentioned Johan Henrik Syling and presumably died in 1727, when the house was sold
- 1727–unknown: Andreas Matthiesen and co-interests
- unknown–1731: Johan Henrik Syling, commerce minister (kommerceråd), brother-in-law of Johan Sohl. On the same occasion, the sale of a garden plot belonging to the property probably took place in January 1728. As it seems, the farm was sold again in 1731 after a claim from a mortgagee, Andreas Brun.
- 1731–1738: Otto von Blome, Privy Councillor (gehejmeråd)
- 1738–1740: Anna Sophie Schack, widowed countess
- 1740–1752: Gregorius Klauman, Justice Minister and bank commissioner, etc., later honorary council of state (etatsråd)
- 1752–1762: Knud Gregorius de Klauman, mayor, etc. (son)
- 1762–1763: Ulrikke Sophie de Klauman (widow)
- 1763–1795: Christian Hansen, wholesaler, one of the 32 Men
- 1795–1814: Jens Schoustrup, wholesaler
- 1814–1818: Peter Schoustrup, wholesaler, and Johan Henrik Schoustrup, grocer (sons)
- 1818–1844: Johan Henrik Schoustrup
- 1844–1872: Peter Jacob Schoustrup, wholesaler and vinegar brewer (son)
- 1872–1912: The insurance company Hafnia
- 1912–1997: The royal porcelain factory, now Royal Copenhagen
- 1997–present: Royal Scandinavia
