= Kreditkassen for Husejere i Kjøbenhavn =

Denmark's first mortgage credit institution

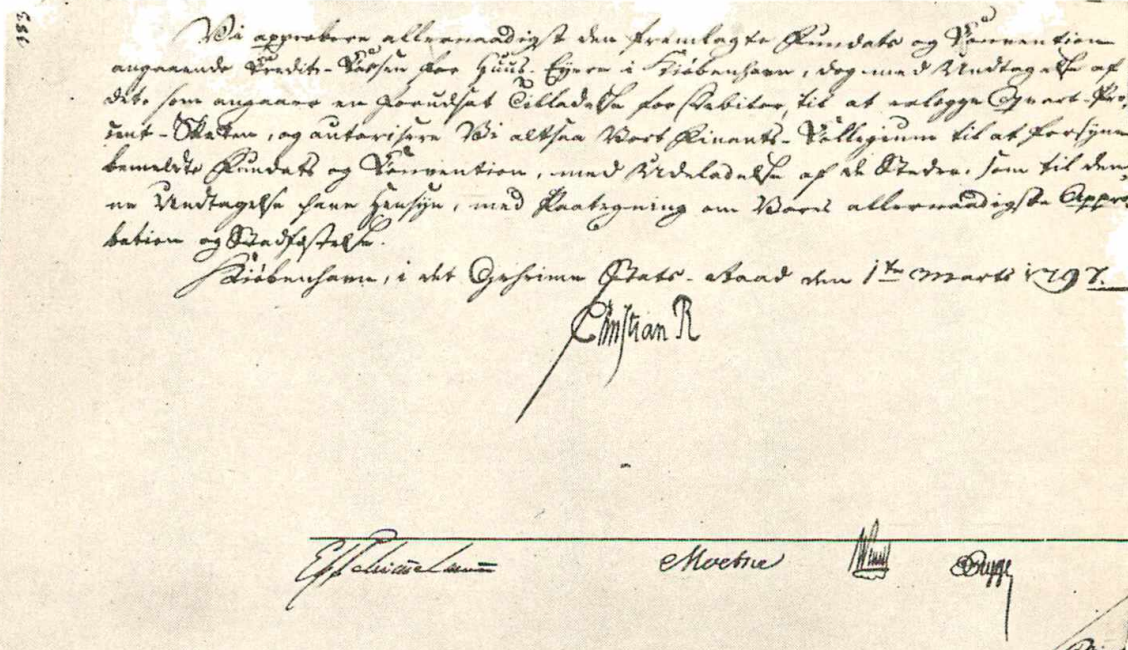
The king's signature on the 1797 resolution.

Kreditkassen for Husejere i Kjøbenhavn was the first mortgage credit institution in Denmark, founded by royal resolution on 1 March 1797. It merged with Byggeriets Realkreditfond (BRF) and was merged in 1975 to form what is now BRFkredit. Its headquarters was located at the corner of Rådhuspladsen and Lavendelstræde in Copenhagen from 1928.

== History ==
Approximately one fourth of Copenhagen was destroyed in the Copenhagen Fire of 1795. Vast sums of money were needed to finance the rebuilding of the city. Financing was normally granted as personal loans without security. The maximum interest rate was at the same time fixed by law at 4%. Access to credit was consequently scarce. Creating Kreditkassen for Husejere i Kjøbenhavn was created to address these problems. It was created at the initiative of Johan Nicolai Tetens, professor Abraham Kall and bookkeeper at Kommercekollegiet Ole Pedersen Holm. They created the first draft for the statutes in 1795. The institution was created by royal resolution 1 March 1797. The first general assembly was held on 8 April.

The model was based on providing loans secured by a mortgage on real estate and with joint and several liability for the borrowers by issuing negotiable debt securities. A similar system had already been introduced in Germany in 1769.

In 1889, Kreditkassen for Husejere i Kjøbenhavn relocated to a building in Ny Vestergade. The building was later demolished to make way for an expansion of the National Museum of Denmark. A new head office was constructed at the corner of Lavendelstræde and City Hall Square. It was constructed in 1928 to designs by Einar Ambt. The building replaced four older properties. After Ambt's death, the construction was completed under the supervision of Georg Juul Brask.

Husejernes Kreditkasse and Byggeriets Realkreditfond (BRF) merged in 1975 to form what is now BRFkredit.
