= Erich Erichsen =

Danish merchant and ship-owner (1752-1837)

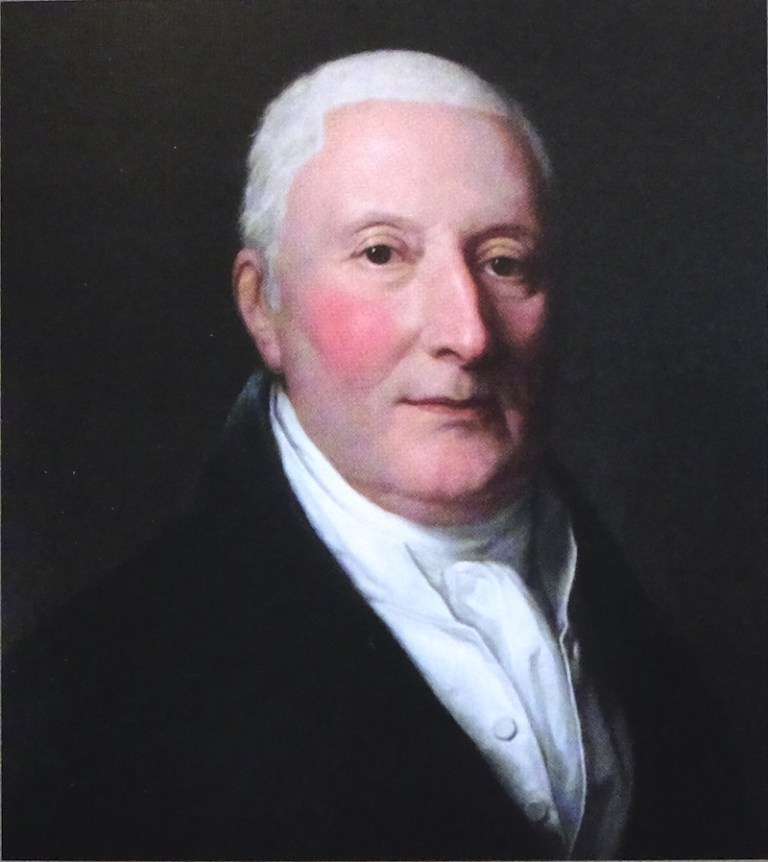
- Portrait by Friedrich Carl Gröger
- Born: 31 March 1752; Odense, Denmark
- Died: 7 January 1837 (aged 84); Copenhagen, Denmark
- Occupations: Merchant and ship-owner

Erich Erichsen (31 March 1752 – 7 January 1837) was a Danish merchant and ship-owner. He owned the trading house C. S. Blacks Enke & Co. from 1783. The Erichsen Mansion in Copenhagen is named after him; the building served as headquarters of Danske Bank, Denmark's largest bank, until the headquarters was moved in 2023.

== Early life and education ==
Erichsen was born in Odense, the son of war and district commissioner and chamberlain Laurids Erichsen (1716–1756) and Charlotte Christiane von Westen (1724–1801). He completed a merchant's apprenticeship in Copenhagen.

== Career ==
After completing his apprenticeship, Erichsen was employed in the Blach trading house. He became part of the management of the company after C. S. Blach's death in 1781. He married Blach's widow in 1783 and thus became the owner of the company that changed its name to C. S. Blachs Enke & Co. He was also involved in money lending. His ships brought spices and precious textiles home from the East Indies and transported grain from the Baltic countries to England. His fleet consisted of 13 ships in 1797.

Erichsen's shipping enterprise encountered adversities after circa 1800. Several of his ships were captured by privateers. Erichsen responded /by increasingly engaging in banking. He provided the Danish government with huge loans in 1808–1812 and again in 1819 and the 1820s.

Erichsen's brother Peter Erichsen was a partner in the company for many years. His sons joined it in 1816. It went bankrupt in 1833.

Erichsen was a member of Danish Asiatic Company's board of directors from 1783 to 1792. He was managing director of Speciesbanken from 1791 to 1813 and a member of the board of representatives of the National Bank from 1818 to 1825.

He was a member of the Council of 32 Men in 1788–1806 and was president of Grosserer-Societetet from its foundation in 1817.

He was appointed to royal agent in 1782, council of state (etatsråd) in 1812 and konferensråd in 1831.

== Property ==
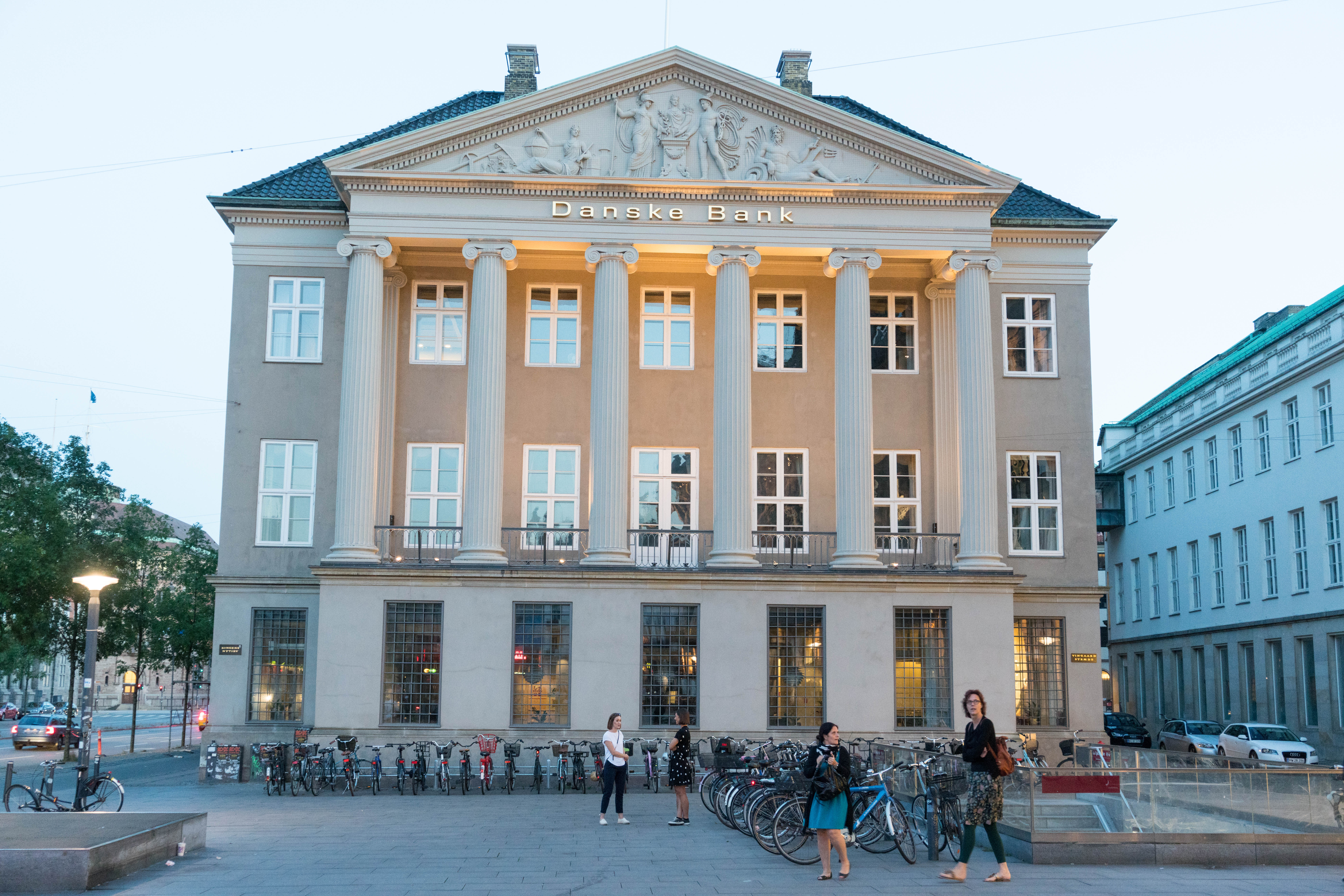
The Erichsen Mansion today

Erichsen constructed the Erichsen Mansion at Holmens Kanal in 1799–1801. He also constructed the country house Hellerupgård to design by Joseph-Jacques Ramée.

In 1807, Blach & Co. owned a warehouse at present-day Bådsmandsstræde 6/Overgaden neden Vandet 51s in Christianshavn and another warehouse at Christianshavns Voldgade 1-3/Overgaden oven Vandet 2 and 2 A.
