= Jørgen Thomsen Bech =

Danish businessman (1731–1816)

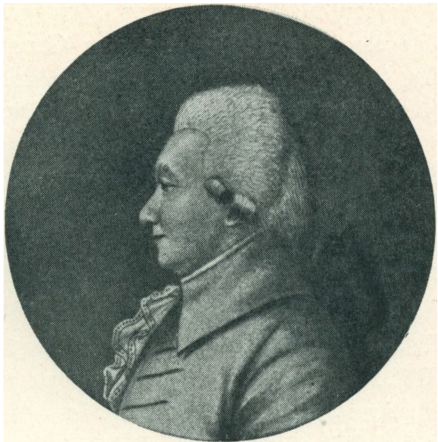
Jørgen Thomsen Bech.

Jørgen Thomsen Bech (21 October 1731 – 11 April 1816) was a Danish businessman.

== Early life and education ==
Bech was born in, Flade, Vendsyssel, the son of copyholder Thomas Jensen (c. 1699 – 1737) and Maren Heylesdatter (c. 1698–1735). He lost both his parents in an early age and was subsequently raised by others. At the age of 12, he was articled to wholesale merchant (grosserer) Jacob Severin in Copenhagen.

== Career ==
In 1751–54, as the assistant of a supercargo, Bech completed an expedition to Canton in one of the Danish Asiatic Company's ships. After returning to Copenhagen, he started a business as a buyer of human hair for hairdressers and wig makers.

He later started his own business, dealing in tea, porcelain and other oriental products. His shop was initially located in rented premises at Nyhavn 41 (then St, Ann's East Quarter, No. 18). He later bought the property for 3,000 Danish rigsdaler.In 1760 he took citizenship as a tea and porcelain merchant.

In 1764, he took citizenship as a wholesale merchant (grosserer) and timber merchant. He took D. H. Bärentz as a partner in his business and from then on traded as Jørgen Bech & Co. In the great trading period at the end of the 18th century, he won a considerable fortune. His main business was in the Baltic countries and Norway, and from Copenhagen he mainly exported colonial goods and Nordic products to the Baltic countries and received timber in return. In the early 1800s, however, the business grew a bit too much for him, and as a result of losses on various connections, he had to suspend his payments, in October 1805 and obtained moratorium; at the end of 1806, however, it could be lifted again after the last creditors had agreed to 75% compensation.

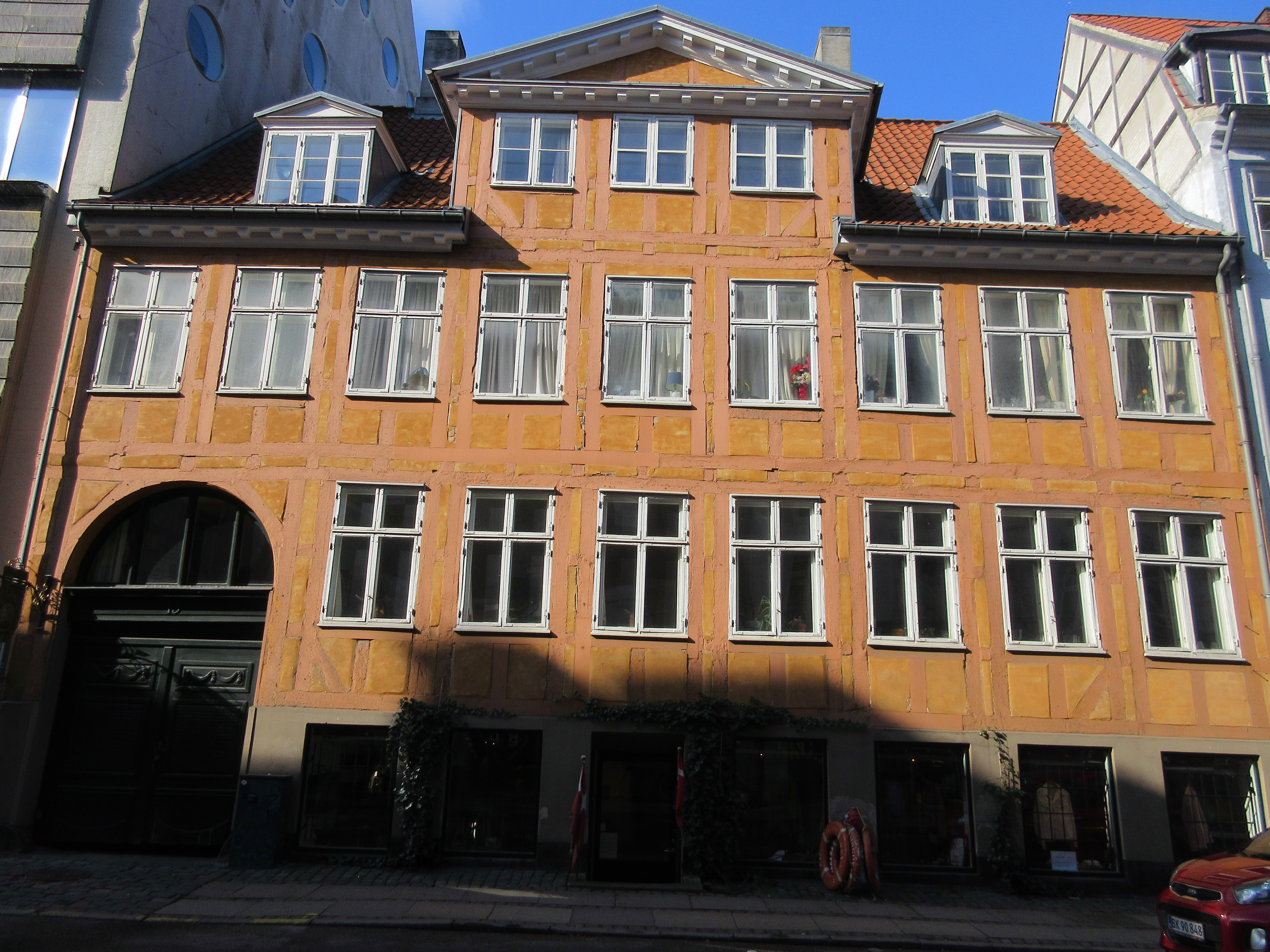
Toldbodgade 15.

Bech owned the property at Toldbodgade 15 and leased one of the 16 timber yards at Kalvebod Beach. During the Battle of Copenhagen, his timber yard caught fire, and as no insurance covered the burned stocks (30,000 Danish rigsdaler), his already greatly reduced fortune took another serious hit.

Alongside his own business ventures, Bech held a number of positions in business. Thus he was, among other things, an accountant in various of the large trading companies. He was also involved in Kjøbenhavns Brandforsikring (Copenhagen Fire Insurance). first as an accountant (dicisor) and from 1844 to 1791 as director. In 1774, he became a member of Copenhagen's Maritime Court with business knowledge, and in 1775 he was elected as one of the city's 32 Men (vice chairman in 1807, chairman in 1810). He took a strong interest in this participation in public life. In 1719, he was created a Knight in the Order of the Dannebrog.

== Personal life ==
On 13 December 1756, Bech married to Anna Elisabeth Hansen (Fielstrup, 1729–1767), daughter of peasant Hans Hansen Bodel Hansdatter. On 28 June 1782, he married Berthe Emerence Restorff (1755- 1831), daughter of senior clerk and later postmaster Rasmus Restorff (1710–87) and Mariane Giørding (ca. 1732–89).

Bech died on 11 April 1816. He was buried at Assistens Cemetery.

He was survived by three children. His business was continued by his son Marcus Christian Bech (1787–1857). He was married to Sophie Birgitte Mathiesen (1791–1867), daughter of Mathias Jørgen Marcussen Mathiesen and Ellen Pohlman. Marchus Bech's sister Mariane Elisabeth Beck (1785–1822) was married to the naval officer Lorenz Lorck (1781–1820). Their elder half sister Anna Marie Jørgensdatter Bech (c, 1767 - ) married to merchant in Øster Risø Tore Torstensen. An elder daughter, Ane Marie (1868–1850, was married to merchant (grosserer) Jens Holbech (died 1811).
