= Andreas Collstrop =

Andreas Collstrop may refer to:

- Andreas Collstrop (1742–1820), a Danish timber merchant and one of Copenhagen's 32 Men
- Andreas Collstrop (1847–1933), Danish timber merchant
