= Rasmus Kirketerp =

Danish businessman and bank manager

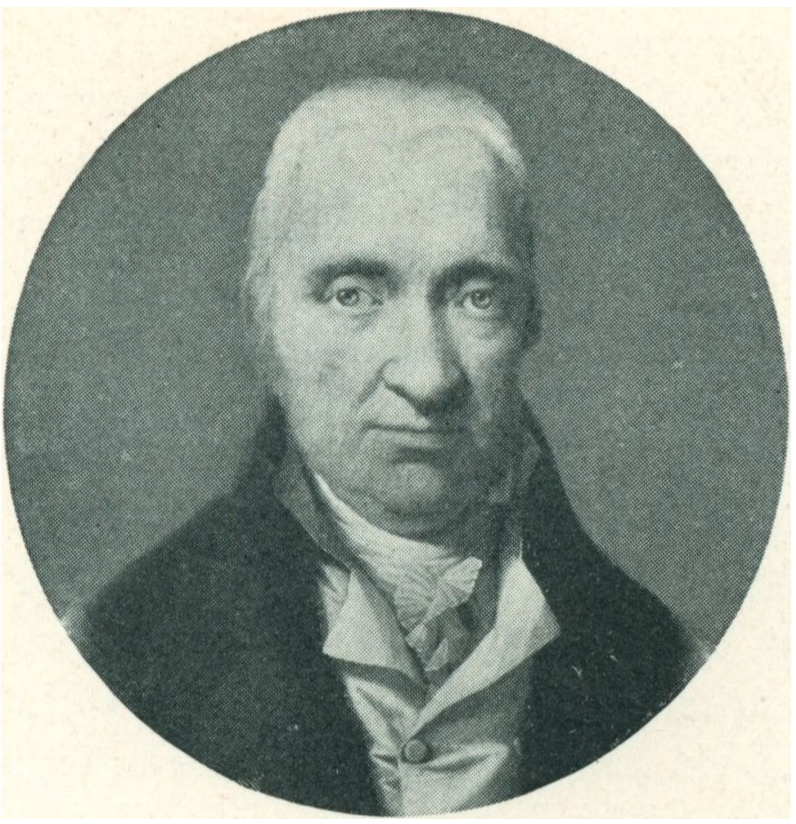
- Born: 8 September 1747; Randers, Denmark
- Died: 27 February 1830 (aged 82); Copenhagen, Denmark
- Occupations: Businessman, bank manager
- Known for: Large merchant in Copenhagen, bank manager
- Notable work: Director of Danske og Norske Species-Bank, Kjøbenhavns Brandforsikring, Livrente-Societetet
- Spouse: Elisabeth Rasmine Beckmann
- Children: Hans Kirketerp, Niels Kirketerp, Ellen Margrethe Christine Amalie Kirketerp, Rasmine Elisabeth Kirketerp, Morten Kirketerp

Rasmus Kirketerp (8 September 1747 – 27 February 1830) was a Danish businessman and bank manager. He owned the property Nyhavn 49 in Copenhagen.

== Early life ==
Kirketerp was born on 8 September 1747 in Randers, the son of Hans Kirketerp (1711–1769) and Sidsel Margrethe Brock (1723–1803).

== Career ==
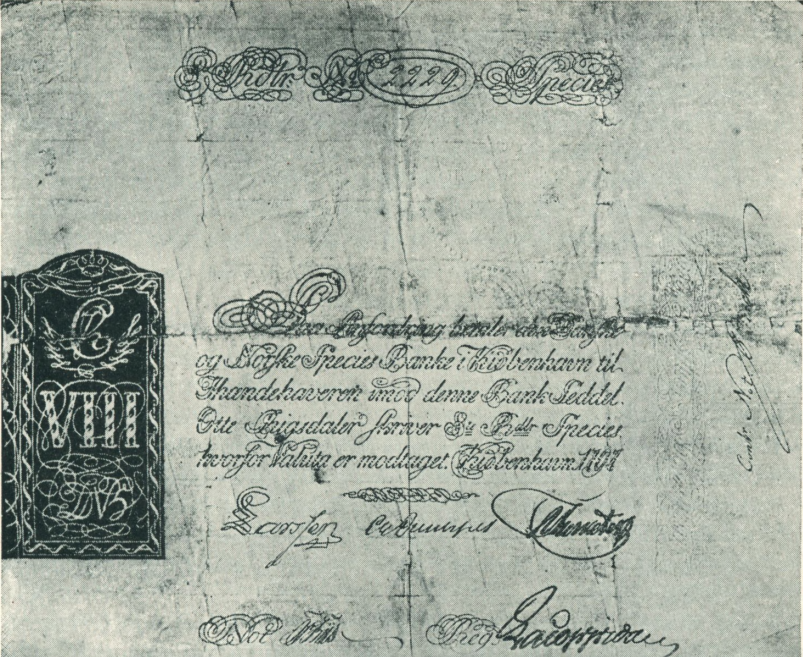
8 rigsdaler species banknote signed by Rasmus Kirketerp, Christian Wilhelm Duntzfeldt and Lars Larsen.

On 9 June 1777, Kirketerp was granted citizenship as a wholesaler (grosserer) in Copenhagen. In the same year, he became a member of Grosserer-Societetet. In the late 1770s and early 1780s, he is mentioned as one of the largest merchants in the city. He was also elected to the Board of Representatives of Danske og Norske Species-Bank. Some time later, he replaced Erich Erichsen as one of the directors of the bank. He was also elected as one of the directors of Livrente-Societetet af 29. Juli 1792 ("Tontine"). On 16 April 1779. he replaced Andreas Skibsted as one of the directors of Kjøbenhavns Brandforsikring. On 27 May 1795, he was himself replaced by wine merchant Jens Lang.

On 23 June 1788, Kirketerp was elected as one of the city's 32 Men. He was a member of a number of important commissions. On 20 June 1794, he was appointed for the Provianterings-Kommissionen. On 4 December 1799, he was appointed for the Kommissionen angaaende Opførelsen af et nyt Raadhus8. On 13 November 1799, he was appointed as one of the directors of the Depositokassen9. On 12 August, he was appointed by the king for Kjøbenhavns Provianterings-Kommission10. On 30 November 1813, he was appointed.

== Personal life and legacy ==
On 6 May 1778, Kirketerp was married to Elisabeth Rasmine Beckmann (1754–183813). She was a daughter of brewer and councilman in Copenhagen Diderik Barthold Beckmann (1721–1790) and Ellen de Pauli (1728–1802).

Rasmus Kirketerp owned the property Nyhavn 49 (then No. 25), St. Annøs East Quarter from around 1790. At the time of the 1801 census, he lived there with his wife, five of their six children, a clerk, four maids, a coachman and a caretaker.

Rasmus Kirketerp died on 27 February 1830. The sons Hans and Niels Kirketerp were both wholesalers (grosserere) in Copenhagen. Hans Kirketerp (1779–1858) was married twice, first to Mette Colstrup (a daughter of timber merchant Andreas Colstrp) and then to Marie Christine Sundorph (a daughter of Søren Christian Sundorph). He lived at Sankt Annl Plads 15. Niels Kirketerp (1784–1855) was married to Erlandsine Frideriche Wandel. They lived in his parents's old house at Nyhavn 49 until at least the 1850s. The daughter Ellen Margrethe Christine Amalie Kirketerp (1783–1838) was married to regiment surgeon Andreas Carl Wandel (1764–1820). Rasmine Elisabeth Kirketerp (1678–1863) was married to wholesaler (grosserer) Albrecht Jørgen Schmidt (1786–1844). Morten Kirketerp was married to his niece Ida Elisabeth Kirketerp (daughter of Hans and Mette Kirketerp). They owned Danstedgaard in 1834. In 1836, he bought Høegholm at Grenå in Jutland.
