= Nicolai Jonathan Meinert =

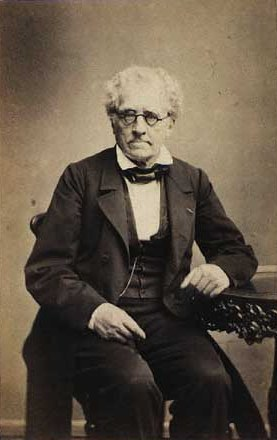
Nicolai Jonathan Meinert.

Nicolai Jonathan Meinert (9 March 1791 – 26 February 1877) was a Danish businessman and politician. He was the father of astronomer Frederik Vilhelm August Meinert.

== Early life and education ==
Meinert was born in Copenhagen, the son of renteskriver Andreas Ewald Meinert (1742–1809) and Maren Kirstine Noe (1755-1842). He grew up in the Behagen House in Christianshavn.

== Career ==
He joined his father's business in an early age. The firm specialized in trade with Norway. He managed the firm on behalf of his mother following his father's death in 1809 and became its owner in 1821. In 1834–67, he was a member of Grosserer-Societetet's committee. In 1835–39 and 1861–65, he was a member of the Bank of Denmark's board of representatives (repræsentantskab).

== Politics and public offices ==
Meinert was a co-founder of Trykkefrihedsselskabet. In 1837, he was elected as one of Copenhagen's 32 Men. In 1840, he became a member of Copenhagen City Council. In 1847–58, he was a councilman. In 1843, he proposed that Copenhagen City Council meetings should be open to the public. In 1842, 1844 and 1846, he represented Copenhagen in the Roskilde Constituent Assembly. He was a member of a number of commissions. In 1843. he was a co-founder of Selskabet for dansk undervisnings fremme i Nordslesvig and of Den slesvigske Hjælpeforening (Syvstjernen). In March 1848, he was one of the hosts of the Casino Meetings. Ge unsuccessfully ran for the Danish Constituent Assembly. In 1854–55, he was a member of the Landsting.

== Personal life ==
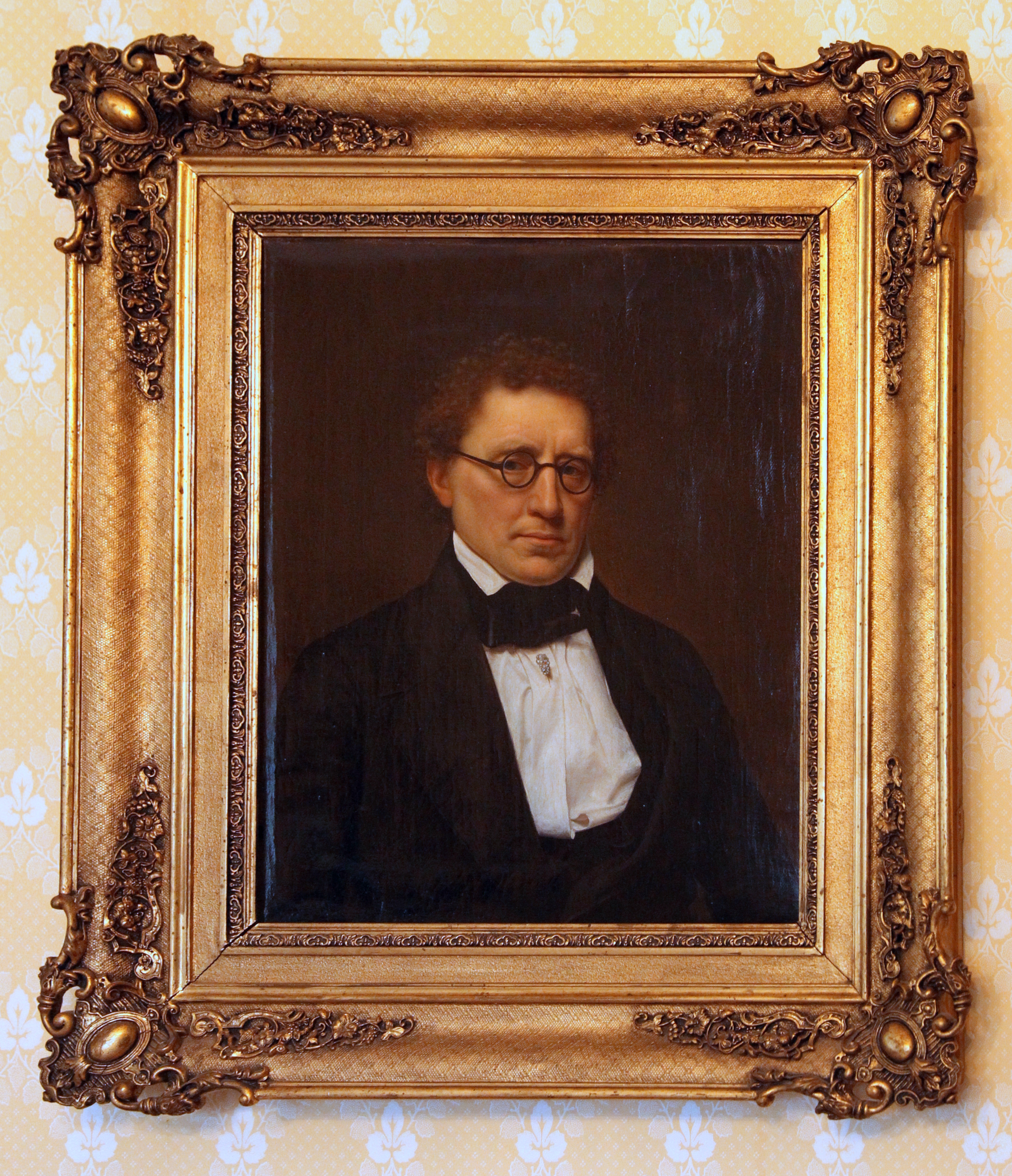
Portrait of Nikolaj Jonathan Meinert

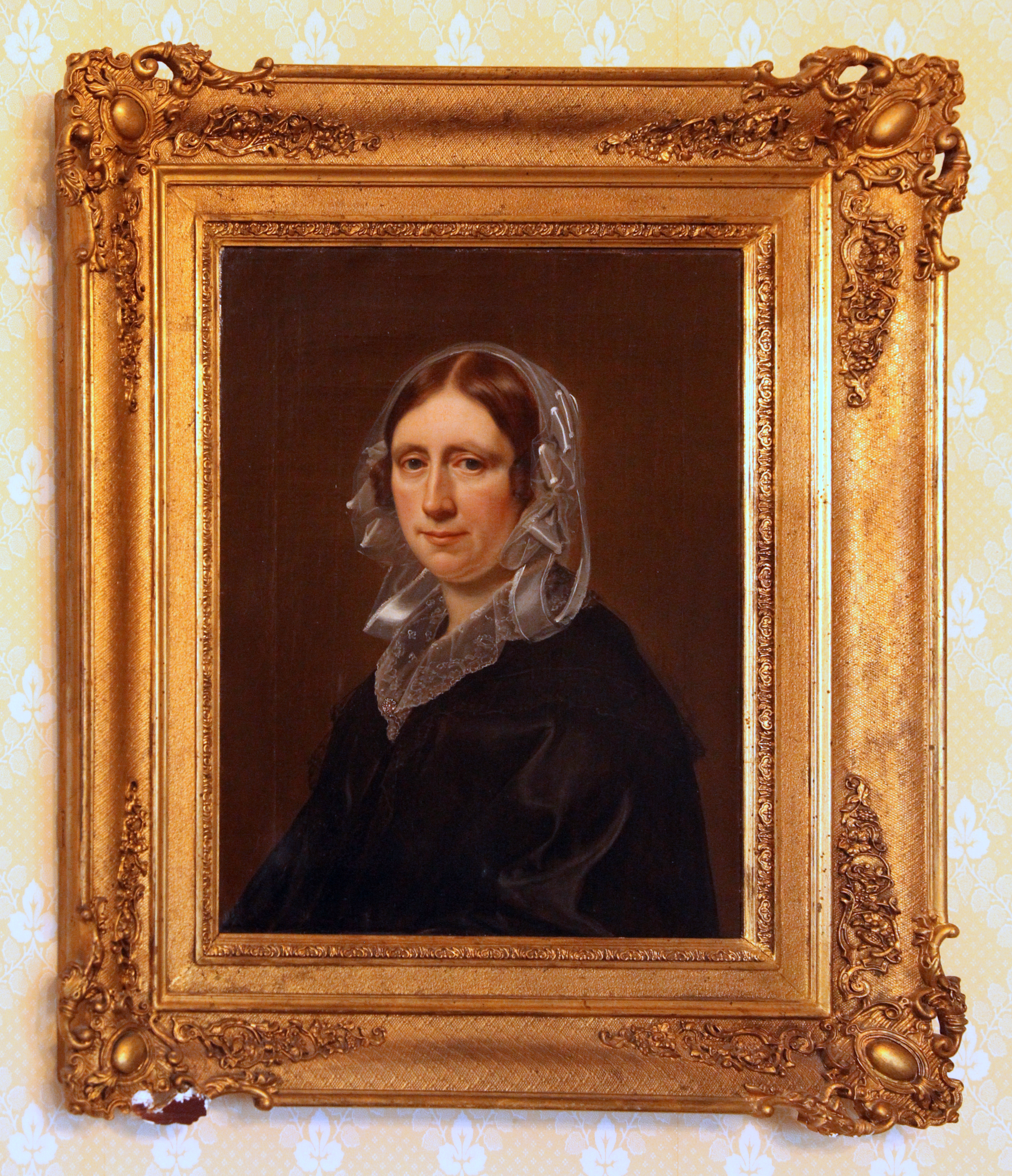
Portrait of Mette Christine Meinert, née Tang.

On 6 August 1819, Meinert married to Mette Christine Tang (1799–1887). Her parents were the owner of Nørre Vosborg Niels Kjær Tang (1767–1814) and Marie Cathrine Meinert (1776–1855). His wife's mother was after the death of her husband married to provost and later Bishop of Ribe Conrad Daniel Koefoed (1763–1831).

At the time of the 1840 census, Nicolai Jonathan Meinert and his wife resided on the first floor of Strandgade 12 with their 10 children (aged seven to 21) and three maids. One of the children was the later astronomer Frederik Meinert.

In 1857, Meinert was created a Knight in the Order of the Dannebrog. He died on 26 February 1877. He is buried in the crypt of Christian's Church.
