= Thøger From =

Danish merchant (1744–1831)

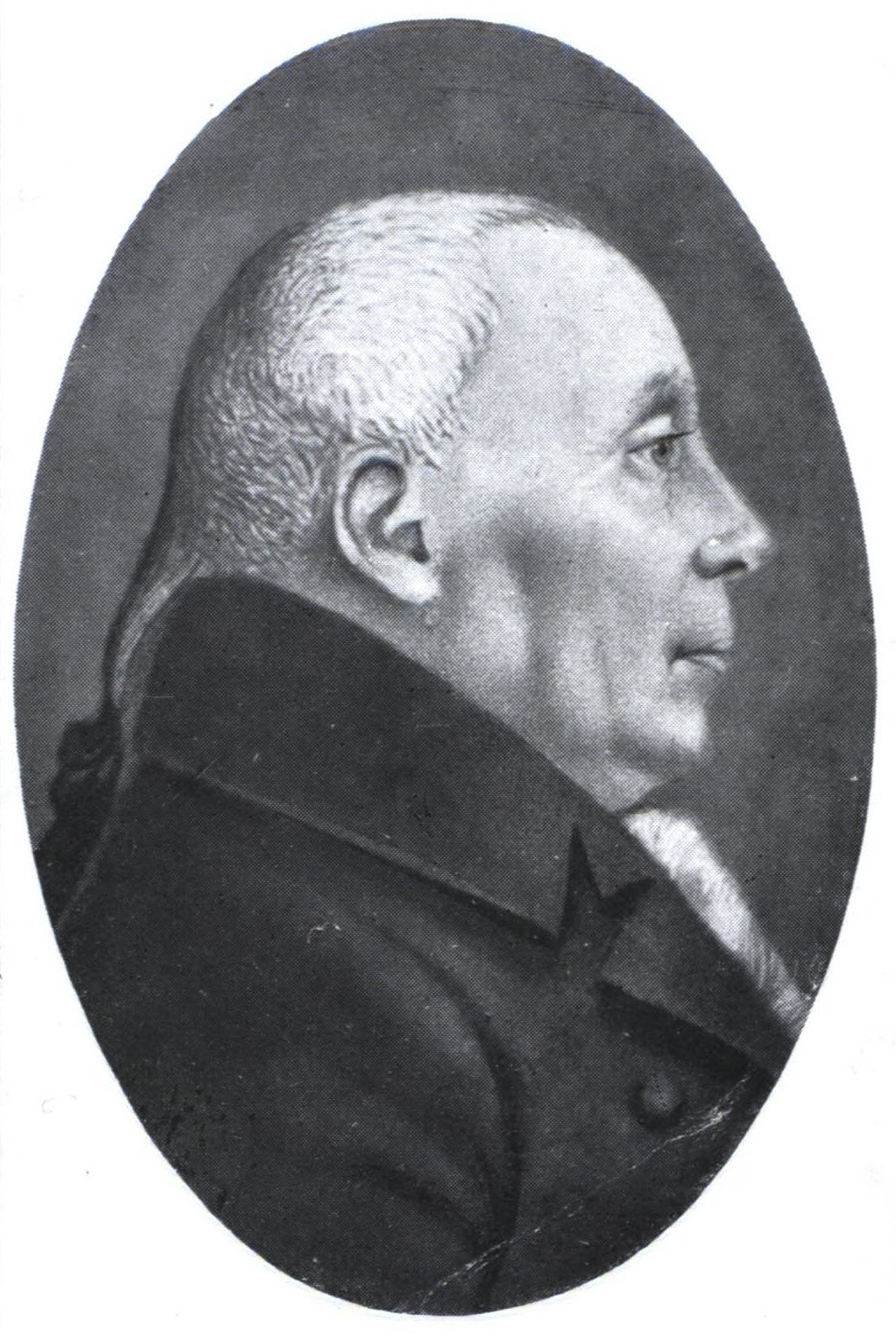
Thøger From.

Thøger Dyssel From (28 May 1744 - 21 March 1831) was a Danish merchant who served as one of Copenhagen's 32 Men. His epinymous Copenhagen-based company (founded 1787) was based at the corner of Rosenborggade and Frederiksborggade from 1794. It was later continued by his son Bertel Jacob From and great-grandson Johannes Michael Holm. Under the latter's ownership, it developed into one of the largest distributors of oil in Denmark. It was based in the same building until its closure in the 1910s-

== Early life ==
From was born on 28 May 1744 in Rødding,Nørlyng Herred, the son of chaplin Bertram Jacobsen From (1707–79) and Anne Catrine Henriksdatter (c. 1703–1800).

== Career ==
On 16 October 1775, From was admitted to Københavns Hørkræmmerlaug. Together with Ole Aarestrup, he established his own grocery business at the. In 1778, he and his partner decided to discontinue their partnership. From 1 April 1789, he traded under his own name. He had also worked for hørkræmmer Hans Pedersen Svane. After Svane's death in 1779, From was married to his widow. By the turn of the century, his business had become one of the most successful of its kind in the city.

In 1795, From bought Anker Borneman's property at the corner of Frederiksborggade and Rosenborggade. In 1810, he bought the rest of the property. In 1798, he became alderman of Københavns Hørkræmmerlaug. In 1810, he was licensed as a wholesaler (grosserer).

From 1795 to 1811, he served as one of the city's 32 Men. On 19 June 1795, he replaced Knud Christensen as one of the directors of Copenhagen Fire Insurance Company. In 1784–1786, he served as one of the directors of the Poor Authority in Trinitatis Parish.

== Personal life and legacy ==
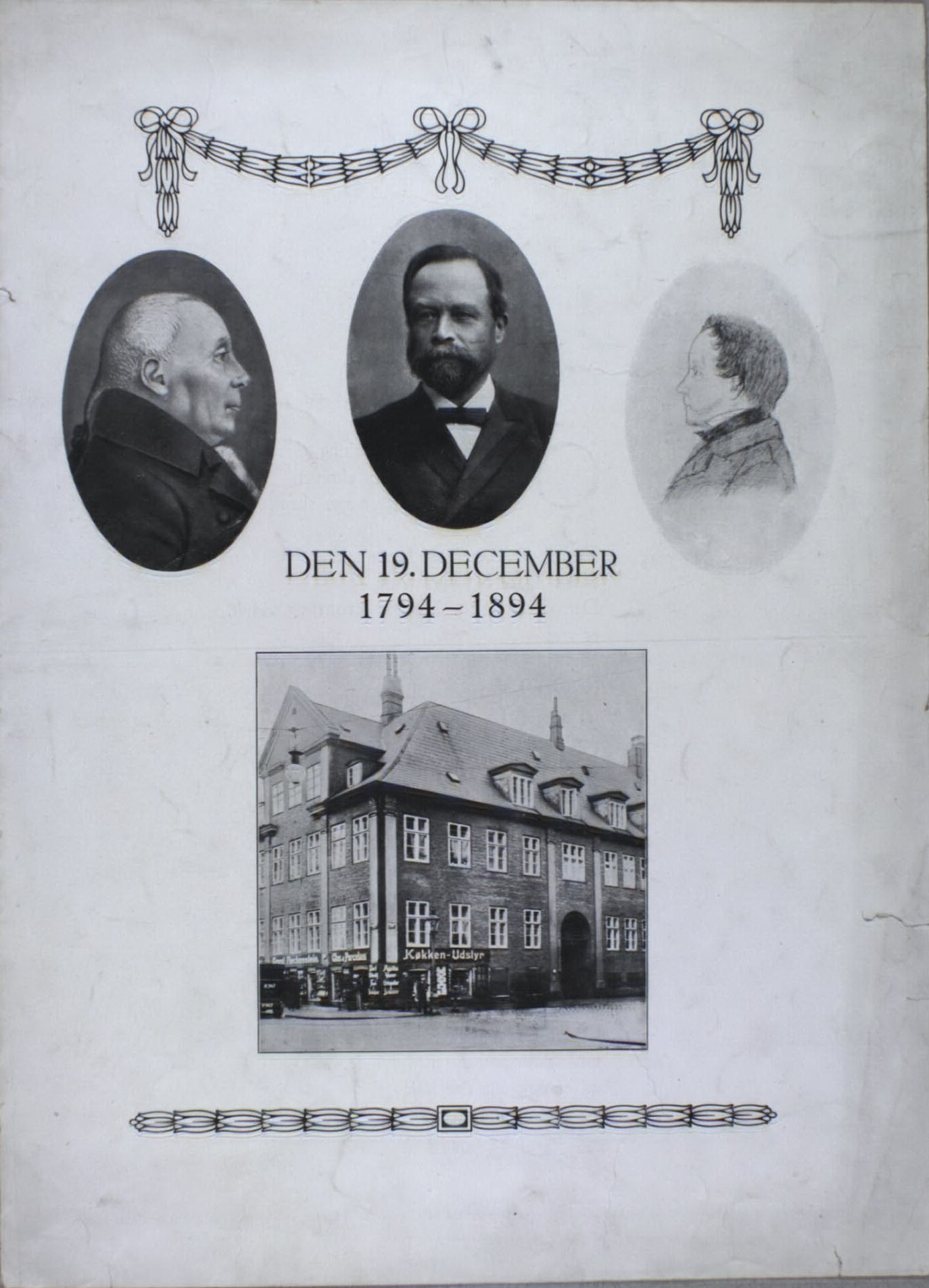
Thøger From 1694– in the same building.

On 23 July 1779, From married to Karen Hansdatter Schäffer (1749–1830). She was the widow of hørkræmmer Hans Pedersen Svane (1738–75). Her parents were hørkræmmer Hans Pedersen Svane (ca.1701-75) and Anne Nielsdatter Triege (ca. 1721–58).

The company was continued by From's son Bertram Jacob From (-1857). He was married to Johanne Erigine West, who had a daughter by her first husband. This daughter was married to the architect Mads Schifter Holm. Their son Johannes Michael Holm grew up in his grandparents' house at the corner of Købmagergade and Rosenborggade. He continued the operations after his grandfather's death. During his ownership, it became one of the largest wholesalers of oil in Denmark. The company was based at Rosenborggade 1 until its closure in c. 1913.
