= Ny Kongensgade 5 =

Building in Copenhagen

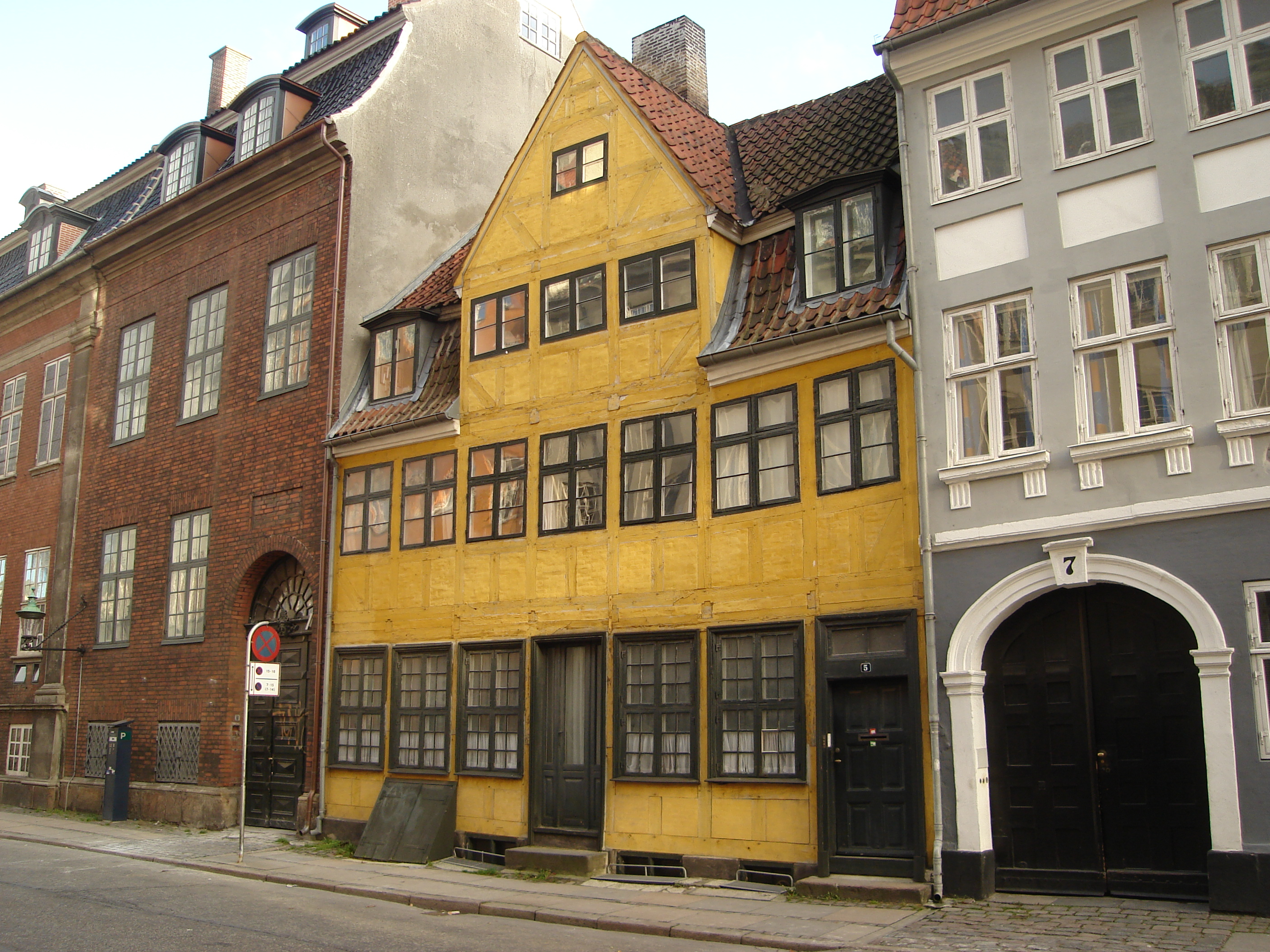
- Interactive map of the Ny Kongensgade 5 area

General information
- Location: Copenhagen, Denmark
- Coordinates: 55°40′25.75″N 12°34′36.44″E
- Completed: 17th century

Ny Kongensgade 5 is an 18th-century property located in the small Frederiksholm Neighborhood of central Copenhagen, Denmark. The building shares a small courtyard with Ny Kongensgade 7. It was listed in the Danish registry of protected buildings and places in 1950.

== History ==
=== 18th century ===
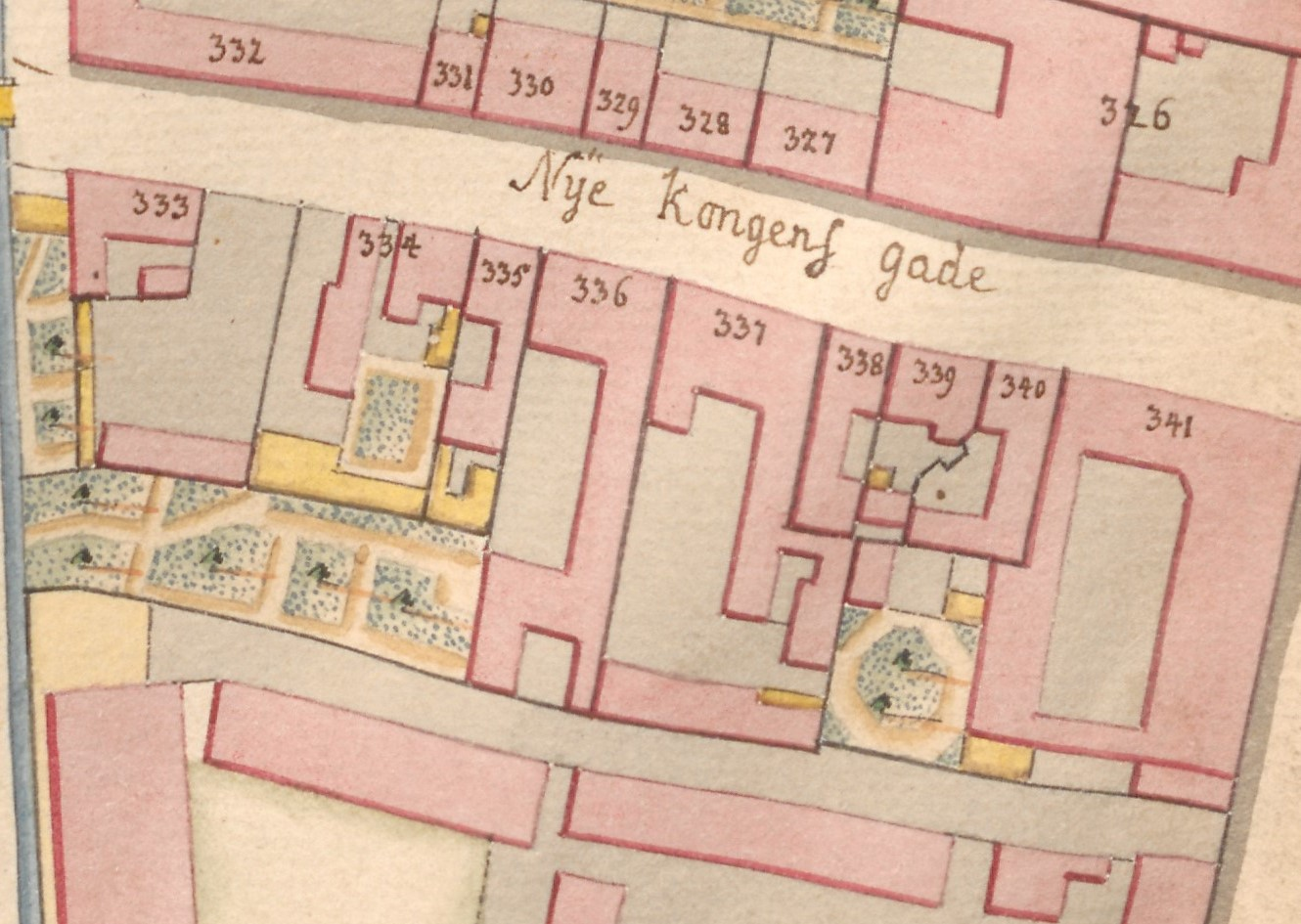
No. 339 seen in a detail from Christian Gedde's map of Copenhagen's West Quarter, 1757

The Frederiksholm quarter was created on reclaimed land in the 1660s. The property was formerly part of a larger property, listed in Copenhagen's first cadastre of 1689 as No. 294 in the city's West Quarter. It was owned by Christen Jensen at that time. The property was later divided into what is now Ny Kongensgade 3-5 and Ny Kongensgade 7. The present building on the site was built as a distiller's house before 1732. The area escaped the devastating Copenhagen Fire of 1728 and the building may therefore predate this year. The owners operated a distillery in the courtyard. In 1751, it was owned by a distiller named Christen Nielsen. His property was listed in the new cadastre of 1756 as No. 339.

=== 19th century ===
The property was listed in the new cadastre of 1806 as No. 235. It was owned by Nikolaj Jørgensen at that time. In 1811, it was divided again into No. 234A (Ny Kongensgade 5) and No. 234B (Ny Kongensgade 3).

In 1812, the property was acquired by Poul Andreas Collstrop (1782–1829). He was already the owner of the neighboring property Ny Kongensgade 7. The two buildings were subsequently sold by his heirs.

The property was home to 20 residents in three households at the 1880 census. Peter Andersen, a grocer (urtekræmmer), resided on the ground floor with his wife Maren Severine Andersen født Bai, his 22-year-old son Anker Severin Andersen and one maid. Poul Madsen, a smith (beslagsmed), resided on the first floor with his wife Anna Kirstine Madsen født Jørgensen, his brother-in-law Kristen Jørgensen Kathave, a five-year-old foster child and three lodgers. Peter Jensen, a haulier, resided on the second floor with his wife Maren Margrethe Jensen født Sørensen, their three children (aged one to nine) and three lodgers.

=== 2+th century ===
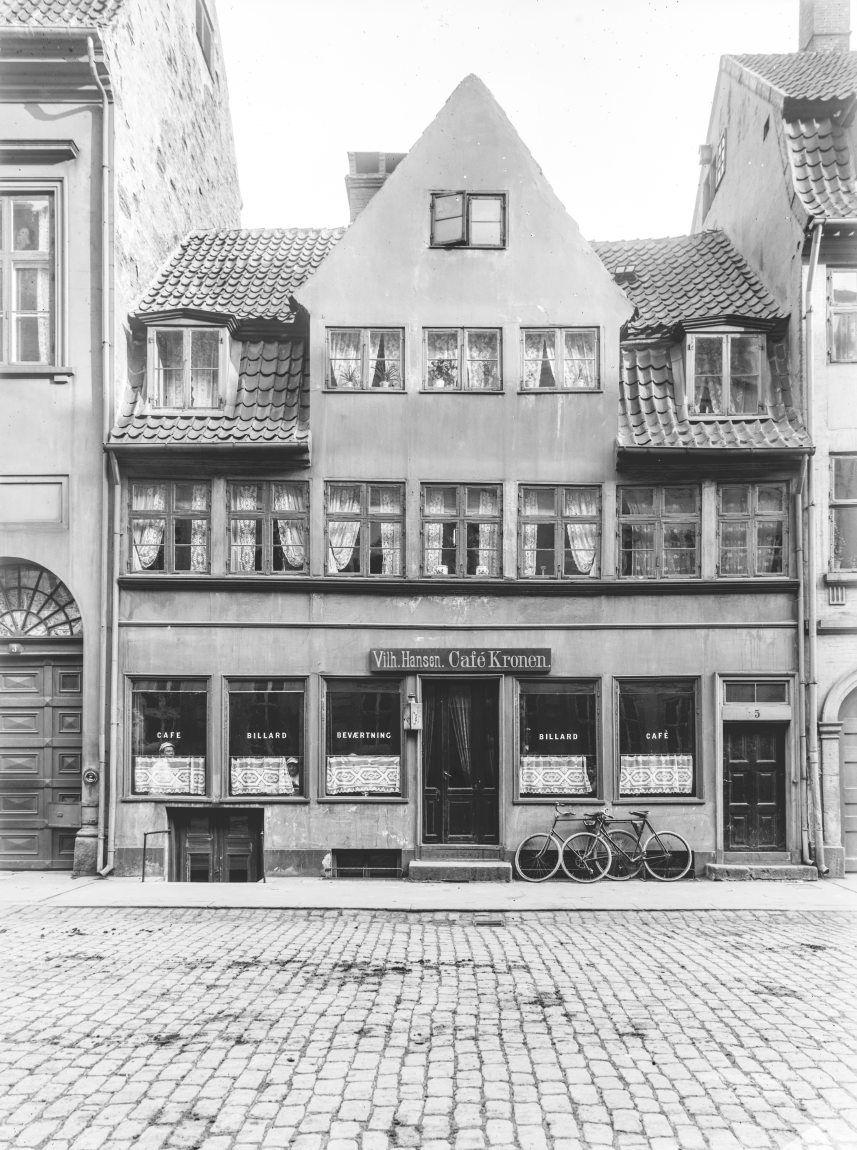
Ny Kongensgade 5, photographed by Johannes Hauerslev, 1905

A tavern was for many years operated in the ground floor. It was in the 1900s operated by a Wilhelm Gansen under the name Kronen (The Crown).

The building was subject to comprehensive restoration work in 1999.

== Architecture ==
The building is a typical example of the buildings that dominated many smaller streets in Copenhagen in the 17th century. It consists of two storeys over a cellar and is finished by a mansard roof with a three-bay wall dormer. It was heightened with one storey in the 1740s. A three-storey, half-timbered side wing from 1751 extends from the rear side of the building.

== Today ==
The building contains one condominium on each of the three floors.
