= Jennow House =

Historic property in Copenhagen, Denmark

- Jennows Gård
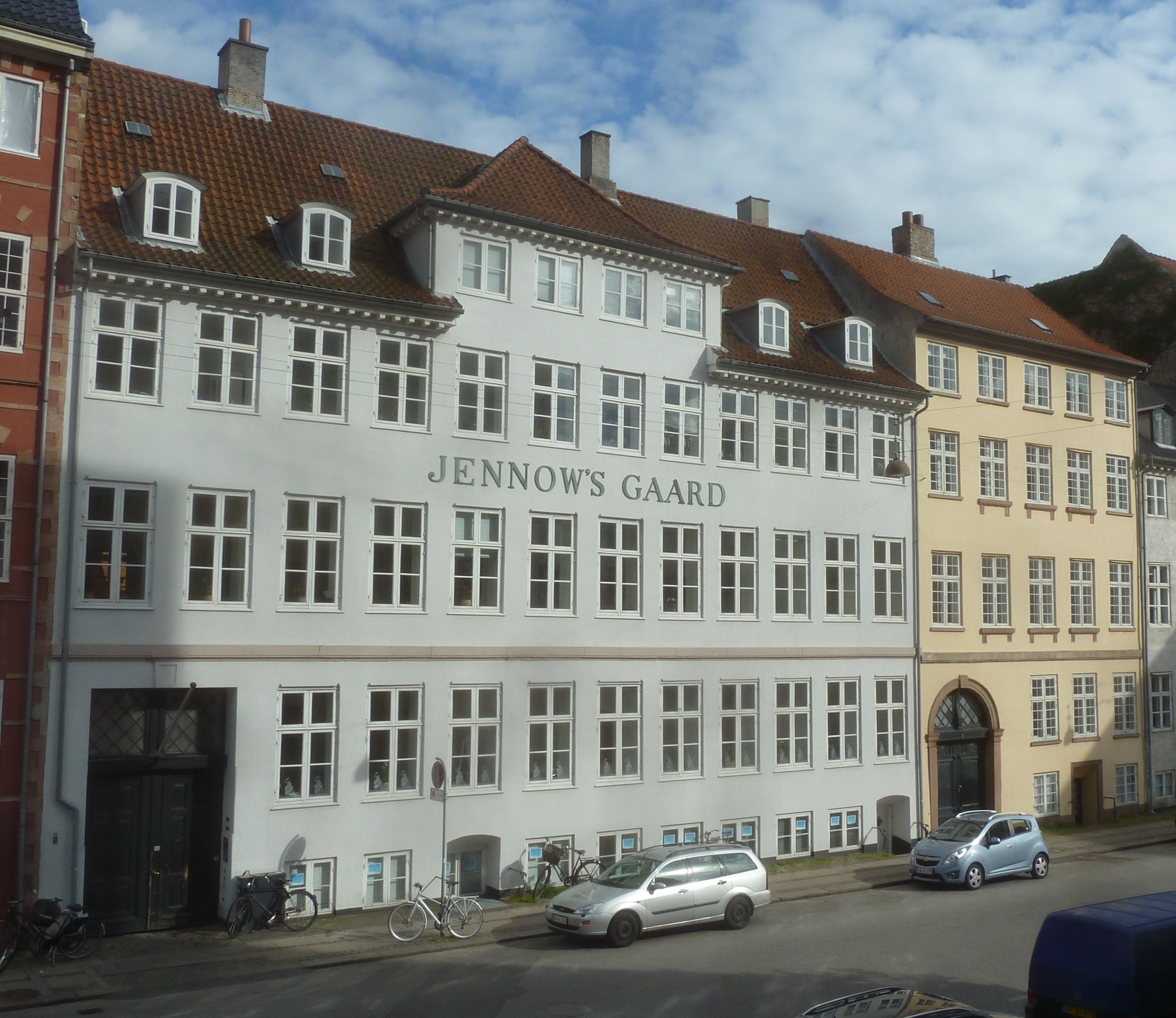
- Interactive map of the Jennow House area

General information
- Location: Copenhagen, Denmark
- Coordinates: 55°40′23.66″N 12°35′19.73″E
- Inaugurated: 1792
- Client: Mathias Rohde

The Jennow House is a historic property located at Strandgade 12 in the Christianshavn neighbourhood of Copenhagen, Denmark. It takes its current name after Andreas Jennow, a businessman who owned it from 1949 to 1978. His company Andreas Jennow A/S was based in the building until 1988.

== History ==
=== 17th century ===
The property was part of a large lot at present-day No. 8–14, which had still not been developed in 1635. It is believed that brewer Jacob Byssing constructed a building at the site prior to his acquisition of the entire corner lot at No. 12–14 between 1689 and 1692. The property was listed as No. 15 in Copenhagen's first cadastre of 1689. It was at that time owned by brewer Anders Svendsen. The site now known as Strandgade 12 was sold off in 1702.

=== 18th century ===
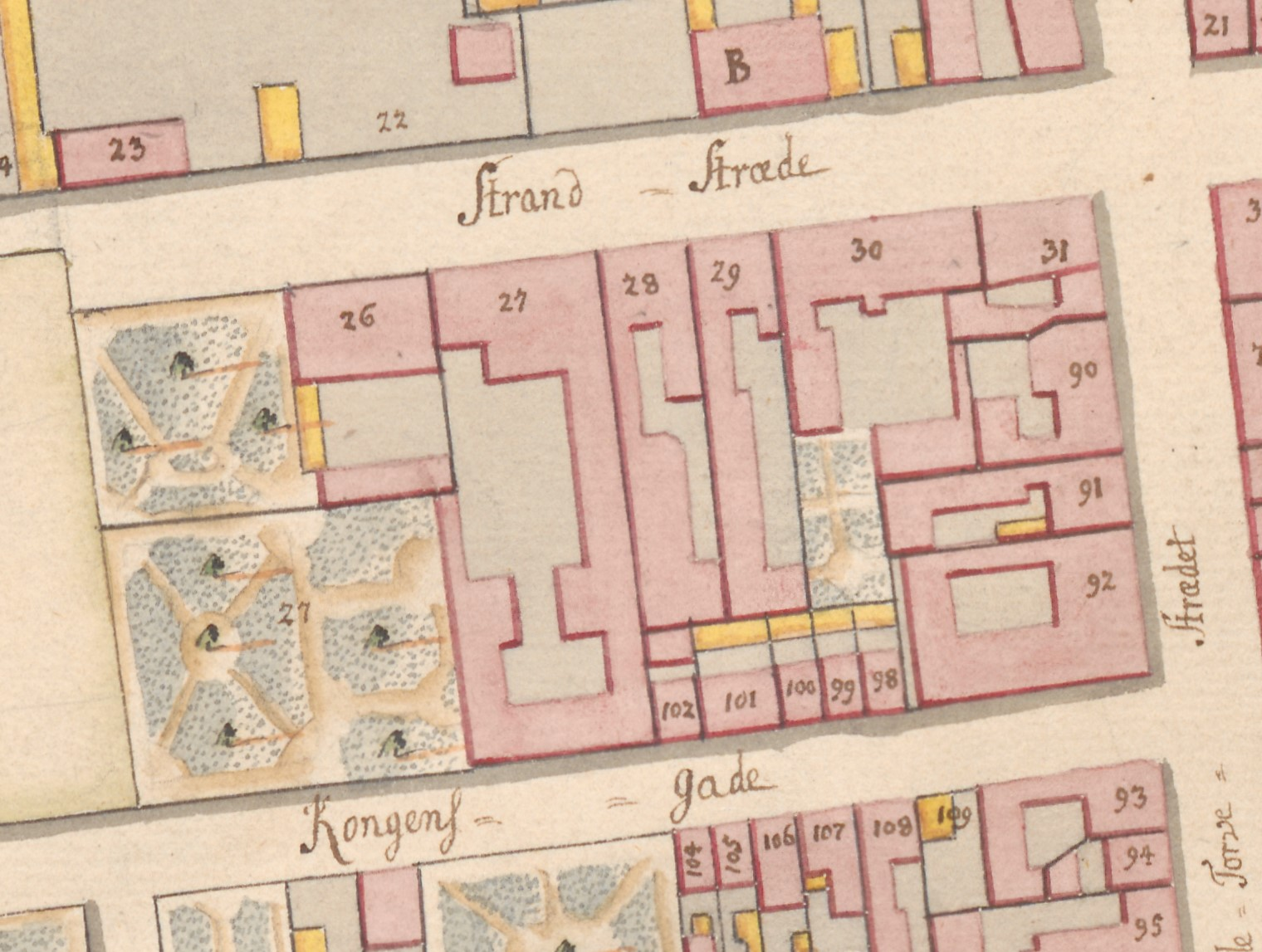
No. 30 seen in a detail from Christian Gedde's map of Christianshavn Quarter, 1757

The property was acquired by Lars (Laurids) Madsen (c. 1720–1781) in 1754. He was licensed as a skipper in 1745 and later settled in Copenhagen as a ship-owner and merchant. He completed a total of 77 voyages to the Danish West Indies from 1763 to 1781. He was married to Anne Cathrine Bertelsdatter. She died in 1755, after having given birth to their son Bertel and their daughters Anne Marie and Ingeborg. Lars Nadseb was shortly thereafter married to a widow, Mette Munck. The couple lived at her property at Torvegade 24 and the house on Strandgade was therefore sold in 1756. Bertel Madsen followed in his father's footsteps. He later purchased the property at Strandgade 4.

The property was home to 20 residents in three households at the time of the 1787 census. Urban Floer, a ship captain, resided in the building with his wife Lovise Floer, their three children (aged two to six) and one maid. Carsten Carstensen, a bookkeeper, resided in the building with his wife Scharlotte Carstensen, their two-year-old son and one maid. Christopher Kindler, a birk judge, resided in the building with his wife Maria Sophie Kindler, their three children (aged one to seven), two maids and three brewers.

In 1787, Kindler also purchased Ringgården in Tårnby. His economy was rather poor and he sold it again in 1793.

=== Rohde family ===
The present building on the site was constructed in 1792 for brewer Mathias Rohde.

The property was home to three households at the 1801 census. Mathias Rohde resided in the building with his wife Christence Cathrine Rohde, his wife's 20-year-old daughter Karine Kolstre, two brewery workers, a soldier and two maids. Mogens Jensen Nørager, an equipment master (equipagemester), resided in the building with his wife Ane Hedevig Nørager, their three children (aged 13 to 20), two foster children (aged eight and 21), three lodgers, a housekeeper and a maid. Sophie Charlotte Leth, widow of ship captain Captain Mogens Rabe Rabeholm (1749-1886) and consul Jens Ancker Adrian Leth (1759-17995), resided in the building with her five children (aged eight to 20), her niece Birgitte Cecilie Larsen, one maid and the merchant (grosserer) Hans Georg Christensen.

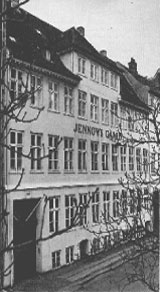
Vintage photo of the Jennow House

The property was listed as No. 52 in the new cadastre of 1806. It was at that time owned by caotain and brewer Christian Aars.

=== Magnus(sen) family ===
The property was home to 29 residents in three households at the 1840 census. Emil Z. Svitzer (1805-1886), a timber merchant, resided on the ground floor with his wife Ida Sophie Switzer (née Holstein), their three children (aged two to six), a clerk, a male servant and three maids. Nicolai Jonathan Meinert, another merchant (grosserer), resided on the first floor with his wife Mette Christine (née Tang), their 10 children (aged seven to 21) and three maids. One of the children was the later zoologist Frederik Vilhelm August Meinert and another one was the ophilantropist Mathilde Meinert. Jacob Frederik Magnus, a third merchant (grosserer), resided on the second floor with his wife Charlotte Amalie Magnus født Soldenfeldt, their two-year-old daughter and one maid.

Lieutenant Colonel F. A. Schleppegrell (1792–1850) lived in the building from 1844 to 1847. Minister of Internal Affairs Peter Georg Bang (1797–1861) lived in the building in 1849.

The property was home to 36 residents in four households at the 1850 census. Jacob Frederik Magnusen, a merchant (grosserer), resided on the ground floor with his wife Charlotte Amalie Magnusen (née Soldenfeldt), their two children (aged nine and 12) and two maids. Johannes Lauritz Hyllerup Geltzer (1799–1878), a major in the Royal Artillery Brigade, resided on the first floor with his wife Louise Henriette Magarethe Geltser (née Hindenburg), their five children (aged four to 12), a niece, his parents-in-law and two maids. Andreas Vilhelm Andersen, another merchant (grosserer), resided on the second floor with his wife Sophie Frederikkke Andersen (née Tikjøb), their four children (aged three to six), one male servant and two maids. Christine Hansen, a concierge, resided in the side wing with her five children (aged 12 to 26) and three caretakers.

The property was only home to two households at the 1860 census. Jacob Frederik Magnusen resided on the ground floor with his wife Charlotte Amalie Magnusen (née Soldenfeldt), a 19-year-old daughter, two maids and the lodger Carl Theobald Worsøe (wine merchant). Carl Frederik Anton Warhs, a pensioner with title of konferensråd, resided on the second floor with his wife Louise Christiane Warhs, a maid and the Flora Thomsen (lodger).actress

=== 1880 census ===
The property was owned by a merchant (grosserer) named Jørgensen at the 1880 census. He did not himself live in the building. Thorvald Emanuel Aagaard (1831-), a manufacturer, resided on the ground floor with his son Birger Peter Aagaard and one maid. Lauritz Eduard Gregersen (1821-1893), a manufacturer of vinegar, resided on the first floor with his wife Andreas Peter Vilhelm Gregersen, their five children (aged 24 to 30), two maids and his brother-in-law Johannes Gottlieb Schmidt. Johannes Henrik Emil Zøylner (1838-1921), a merchant (grosserer), resided on the second floor with his wife Harriet Clausen, their six children (aged one to eight) and four maids.

=== 20th century ===
The grocer Andreas Jennow purchased the property in 1949. In 1916, he had co-founded the trading company Jennow, Maage & Co., part of Russisk Handelskompagni which traded with Russia. For a while he worked out of Riga but had returned to Denmark as a result of the political unrest in the 1930s. Hennow owned the property until his death in 1978. It was partly converted into condos in 1979, but his company Andreas Jennow A/S was based in it until 1988. It is now headquartered in Birkerød to the north of Copenhagen.

== Architecture ==
The three-storey property is 12 bays wide and has a four-bay wall dormer. It also comprises a seven-bay side wing to the right in the courtyard, which dates from 1731 to 1747.

== Gallery ==
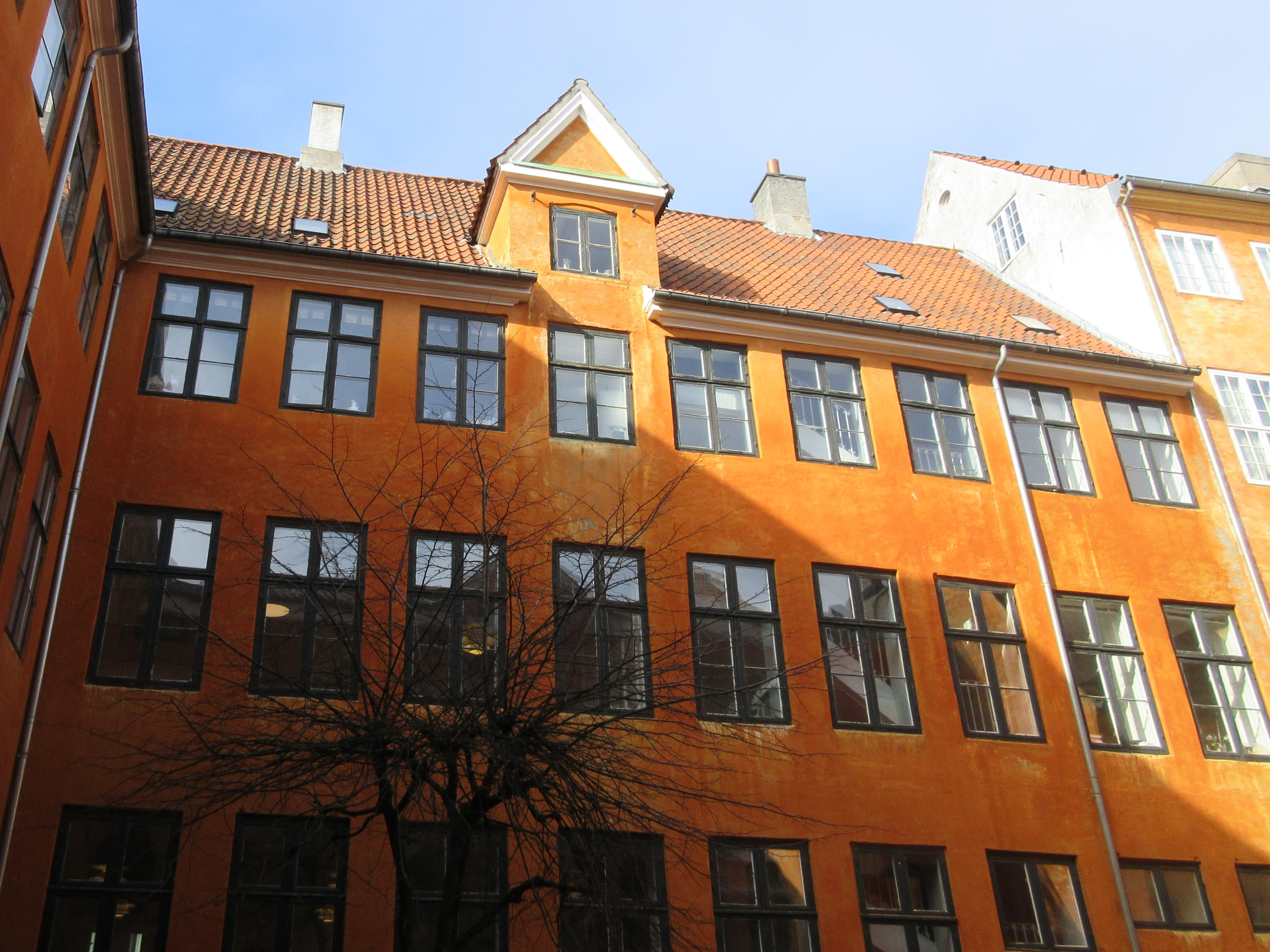
The main wing seen from the rear

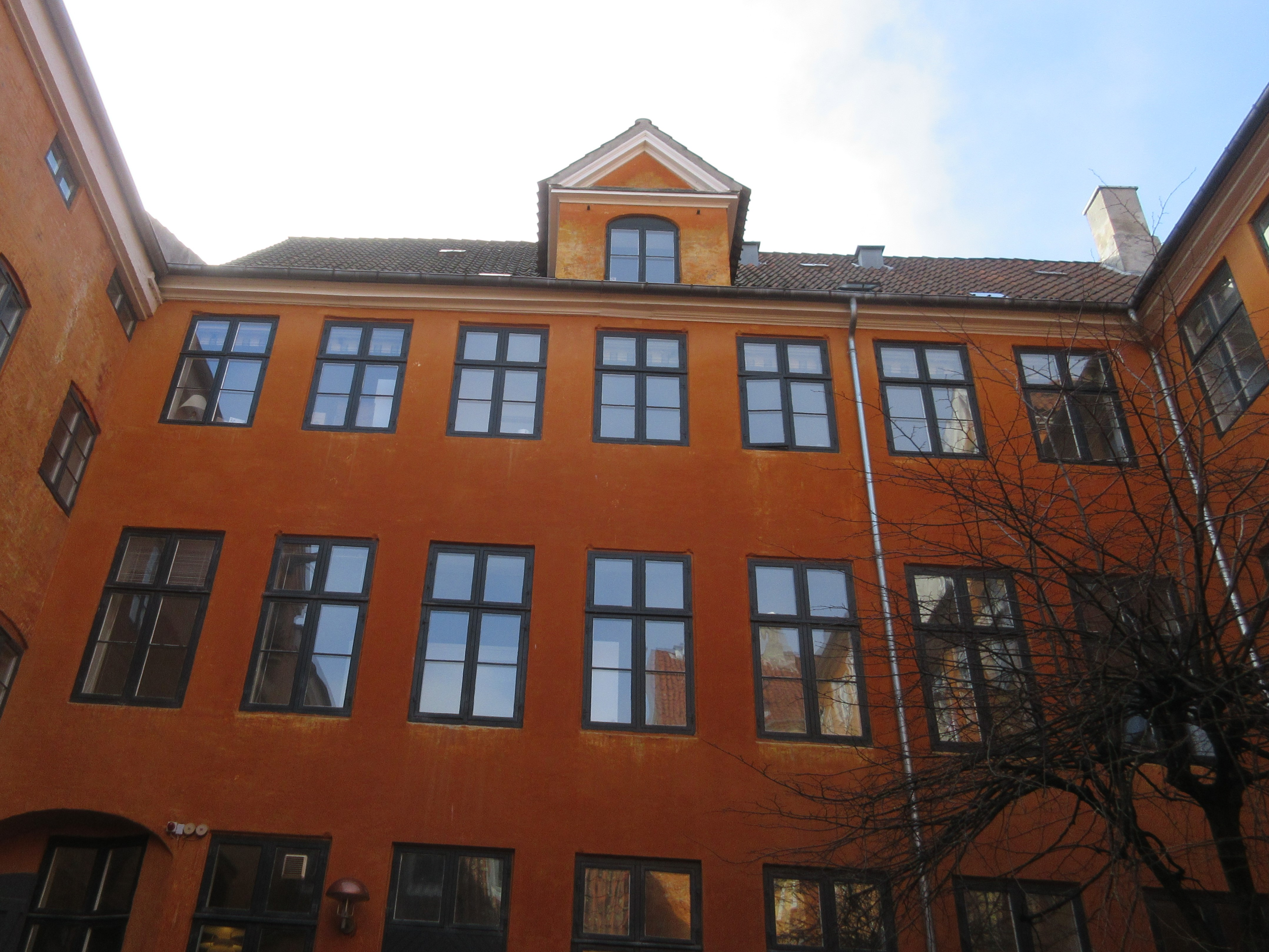
The side wing

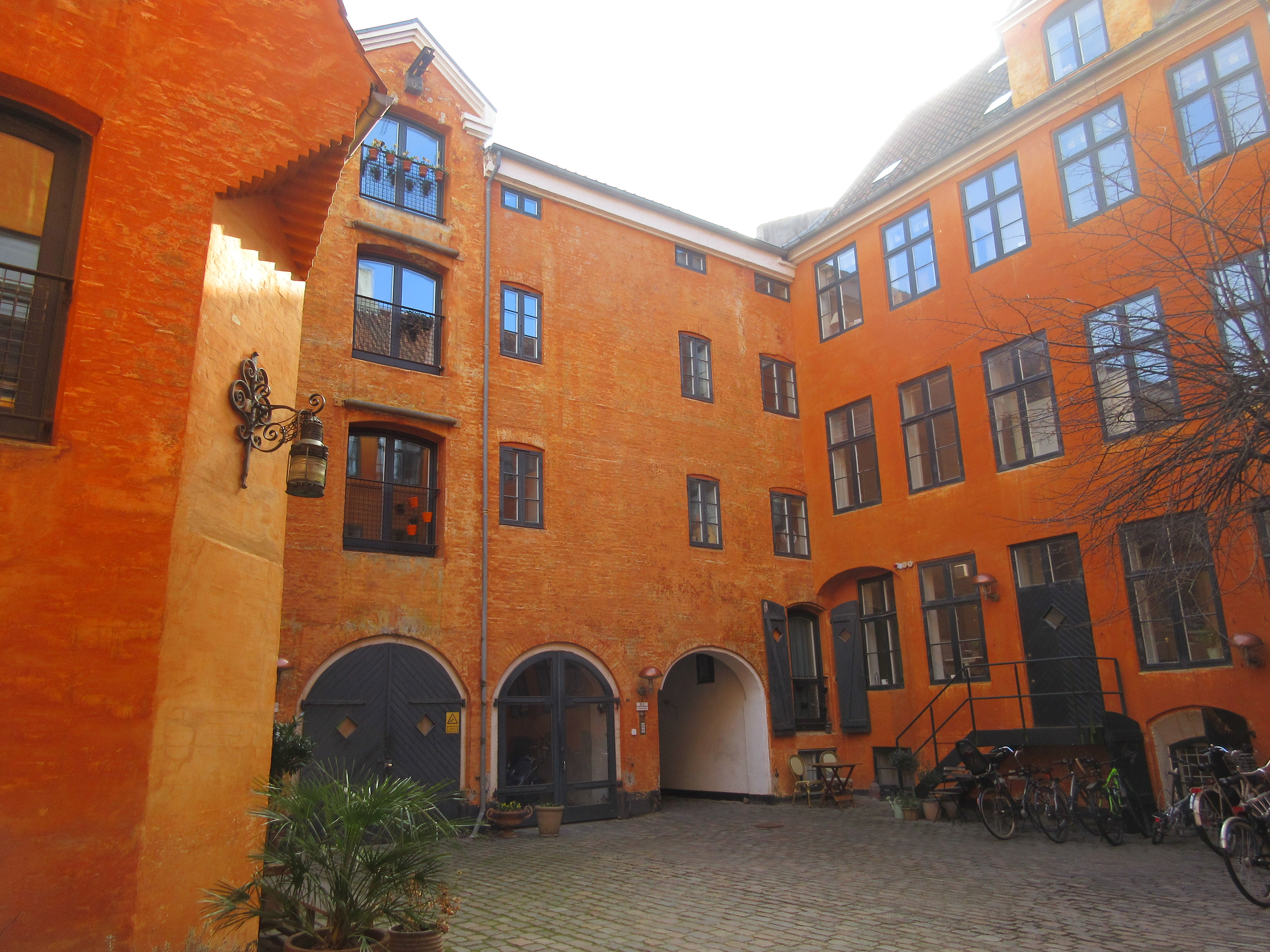
The rear wing (left) and part of the side wing (right)
