= 32 Men =

Historical Danish assembly in Copenhagen

The Assembly of 32 Men (Danish: De 32 Mænds Forsamling), also known as the City's 32 Men (Stadens 32 mænd) or simply as the 32 Men (De 32 Mænd), was an assembly of respected citizens of Copenhagen, who had the right to demand an audience before the king. The assembly was first established in 1660. The first assembly was characterized by large merchants and the crown's creditors. The assembly was replaced in 1840 by the Copenhagen City Council (Borgerrepræsentationen).

== Chairmen ==
- Bertel Stuve
- N. Jacobsen (c. 1636–1706); brewer
- Ewert Weinmann
- Nicolaj Fincke; brewer
- Aage Kaarsbøl; wine merchant, 1781–
- Christian Hansen; wholesaler, 1795–1810

== Members ==
Name	Term	Profession	Notes
Frederik Thuresen	1659—1675,	Stadshauptmand	1st President
Henrik Jakobsen	1659—1660		2nd President. Councilman.
Hans Therkildsen	1659—		
Niels Auchesen	1659—		
Laurids Pedersen Hesselberg	1659—		
Christen Jensen Bech	1659—		
Villum Fuiren	1659—1660		Councilman.
Jens Thomesen	1659—		
Caspar Grot	1659—	Merchant	
Johan Lehn	1659—1668	Wine merchant	Councilman.
Albrecht Itzen	1659—1679		
Herman Isenberg	1659—80		
Peder Jakobsen Flensborg	1659—		
Jørgen Hansen Ravn	1659—		
Johan Bøfke	1659—		
Steffen von Essen	1659—1667		
Cort Heinrich Mercker	1659—		
Rasmus Hansen Munch	1659—70		
Peder Juel Rasmussen	1659—		
Hans Herman Heister	1659—		
Ditmer Bøfke	1659—1672		President. Councilman.
Mourids Friche	1659—		
Leonhart Klouman	1659—1664		Councilman.
Johan Adolf Ernst	1659—1676		
Albert Dysseldorf	1659—		
Karl Rosenmejer	1659—		
Hans Pedersen Klein	1659-1666		President. Councilman.
Strange Trøner	1659—		
Hans von Mølengraff	1659—		
Søren Pedersen	1659—		
Søren Lauridsen Præstø	1659—		
Johan Slichman	1659—	Goldsmith.	
Poul Førster	1659-1673	Possemenlmager	
Peder Riber	1659—1689	Tailor	
Augustinus Otto	1659—	Smith	
Klaus Weboe	1659—	Shiemaker	
Mads Rasmussen	—1661—		
Mourids von der Tide	1661, 1679		
Johan Mikkelsen	1661, 1671		
Henrik Høckel	—1667		
Lorenis Sass	—1667—		
Jørgen Wilte	—1669		
Peter Holsthorst	—1669		
Iver Jakobsen Bruun			
Peter Molzfeldt	—1681	Bintapper	President. Councilman.
Johan Drøge	—1685		President
Jakob Nielsen	1671, 1677		
Berlel Jespersen	—1686		
Peder Tuesen	—1689		
Søren Jørgensen	1671		
Bartholomæus Jensen	—1676		Councilman.
Bartold Stuve	—1702		President
Erik Munk	1671, 1672		
Peter Wolf	1671, 1672		
Jens Jensen Wissing	1671, 1672		
Thomas Jensen Dobbelsteen	—1695		
Anders Borris	1671, 1672		
Hans Knudsen Leegaard	—1677		President.
Anders Rasmussen	—1684		
Jakob von Fyhren	1671, 1672		
Nicolaus Rens	—1677		
Helmer Didriksen	1671, 1679		
Claus Iversen	—1688.		Councilman.
Augustinus Dreyer	1671, 1672		
Jørgen Naunitzen	1671, 1672		
Peder Villadsen	1671, 1672		
Søren Pedersen	1672		
Lorents Krejer	—1702,		President.
Thomas Ochsen	—1686		
Henrik Høyer	1672, 1677		
Arved Mikkelsen Edelberg	—1701	Notary	Councilman.
Christian Beverlin	—1692		
Claus Reimert	—1692		
Peder Jakobsen Timmerman	—1685		
Hans Nielsen	1677, 1679		
Jørgen Stilche	—1683	Goldsmith	
Hans Jensen Stampe	—1682		Councilman.
Nicolaus Ballzersen	1677		
Claus Byssing	—1688		
Peder Munch	—1681		
Johan Miillich	—1685		
Jakob Feldtman	—1701		
Niels Nielsen	1679		
Anders Knoch	—1693		
Jokum Kurlz	1679		
David von Cølln	—1686		
Henrik Schupp	—1690		
Gysbert Wigand Michelbecker	—1692		
Ole Witt	—1701		
Niels Jakobsen	—1706	Brewer	President.
Jørgen Gregersen	—1687		
Søren Rasmussen Hjortshøj	—1707		President.
Sander Graa	—1685		
Anders Kellinghusen	—1719	Merchant (urtekræmmer)	
Mathias Wessel	—1695		
Lambert Mandel	—1686		
Hans Levesen	—1695		
Johan Jiirgen	—1698		
Hans Trøner	—1688		Councilman.
Jens Pedersen Riber	—1693		Councilman.
Nikolaj Boye	1686—		
Evert Weinman	1686—1710		Oresident.
Jørgen Bøfke	1686-88		Councilman.
Jakob Eschenberg	1686—1695		
Hans Mikkelsen	1686—1701		
Henning Jordt	1686—1687		
Henrik Wørmer	1687 —1695		
Johannes Bacher	1687—		
Johannes Christensen Meller	1687—1692	Brewer	Councilman.
Frederik Knudsen	1687—		
Wulf Pedersen	1688—		
Johan Ising	1688—1706		
Abraham Lehn	1688—1709		
Morlen Munch	1691—1711		President.
Peder Ogelby	1698—1714		President. Councilman.
Henrik Jensen	1698—		
Peder Bladt	1698—	Brewer	Notary.
Mathias Pedersen Ramshardt	1701 —10		Councilman.
Jakob Edelberg	1701—09		Councilman.
Johan Herman Schrøder	1701—	Merchant.	
Peter Wielandt	1701—		
Anders Lauridsen Beck	1701—1711		
Hans Frich	1691—	Merchant	
Hans Rasmussen	1691—		
Jakob Jakobsen	1691—1709		
Allert Tønsberg	1691—1707	Merchant	President.
Søren Sørensen	1691-1701	Brewer	
Jørgen Sechman	1692—94		Vouncilman.
Laurids Nielsen Fogh	1693—97		Councilman.
Johan Syling	1693—1705		
Jens Tidemansen Lovmand	1693-1703	Brewer	
Gert Mejer	1694-1706		
Mads Christensen	1694—1705		
Peder Rigelsen	1694—1708	Merchant	
Jakob Hou	1694—1718		President
Jørgen Meulengracht	1695—1698		Councilman.
Eilert Sluhr	1695—		
Christian Meyer	1695—1710		Oresident, Councilman.
Morten Movridsen	1695—1705		
Jost Kiørning	1695—1706		Councilman.
Hans Jørgen Ogelby	1701—1711		
Bertel Stuve Henriksen	1701—1709		
Niels Jakobsen Wiger	1703—1726		
Reimert Wilde	1703—		
Jakob Sørensen Graae	1703—1705		
Hans Mikkelsen Holm	1703—		
Knud Pedersen Storm	1703—1705		
Hans Pedersen	1703—	Brewer	
Peter Dorn	1705—20	Tanner	
Kaj Klinge	1705—10		Councilman.
Alexander Duden	1705—		
Nikolaj Olufsen Wroe	1705 —14	Merchant	President. Councilman.
Jens Olsen	1705—10		Councilman.
Hans Mikkelsen	1706—18	Textile merchant	President. Councilman.
Lyder Styfken	1706—		
Hans Stuve	1706—1716		Councilman.
Markus Johansen	1707—1724		
Claus Didriksen	1707—		
Jakob Nielsen	1708—29	Merchant	President.
Peder Fjelderup	1708—		
Hans Garben	1709—	Textile merchant	
Steffen Lindeman	709—1711	Merchant	
Christian Schupp	1709—25	Merchant	President. Councilman.
Lorenis Frost	1709—11	Merchant (urtekræmmer)	
Johan Sohl	1709—		
Christen Sørensen	1710—22	Brewer	Councilman.
Peder Friborg	1710—18		
Henrik Nissen	1710—		
Jens Nielsen	1711—	Brewer	
Niels Pedersen Gjedsted	—1725	Brewer	Councilman.
Peder Lundt	1711—	Merchant	
Bertel Kløcher	1711—	Merchant	
Peder Iversen	1711—	Merchant	
Jens Nielsen Riber	1711—		
Nikolaj Burmester	1714 —25	Ucelandic merchant and brewer.	Notary. Councilman.
Jakob Løvberg	1714—21	Merchant	
Herman Waleur	1714—29	Canvas merchant	
Peter Mathiasen	1714—32	Brewer	Notary
Octavius Holman	1716	Guldtrækker.	
Peder Hesselberg	1716—		
Jakob Borris	1718—	juvelerer	
Jens Graae	1718—		
Niels Birch	1718—	Wholesaler (grosserer)	President.
Mikkel Andersen Fjeldsted	1718—20	Brewer	Councilman.
Jørgen Mathisen Lamberg	1719—	Merchant	
Jens Lassen	1719—27	Brewer and Icelandic merchant	Councilman.
Niels Hendriksen	1719—27	Icelandic merchant	President. Councilman.
Laurids Dixen	1719—34	Brewer	
Didrik Bortman	1721—32	Timber merchant	
Hans Pedersen Callundborg	Brewer	1721-1725	
Jokum Broch	1721—25	Brewer	
Vitus Bering Mathisen	1721—25	Brewer	
Johan Arnold Cølner	1723—32		
Andreas Hansen	1723 —	Textile merchant	
Johan Walbom	1723—59	Merchant (urtekræmmer)	
Johan Rehling	1724—1744	Textile merchant	
Hans Henrik Saltou	1724—1730	Textile merchant	
Frederik Hæsekier	1724—		
Didrik Dressing	1725—	Merchant (urtekræmmer)	
Johan Ludvig Clare	1725—27	Textile merchant	
Didrik Bartold Bechmand	1725—1748	Canvas merchant.	
Christen Gierløf	1726—1743	Brewer	
Cort Kellinghusen	1726—40	Textile merchant	
David Jensen	1726—1740	Silk merchant	
Frederik Fabritius	1726—	Juvelerer	
Jokum Frederik Buss	1726-39	Brewer	
Niels Prydtz	1727—52	Merchant	
Christoffer Jensen Lund	1727—48	Merchant	President.
Hans Hansen Berg	1727—	Wine merchant	
Albrecht Hansen Bremmer	1727—		
Bartholomæus Jakobsen	—1729	Merchant	
Henrik Lund	1729—	Brewer	
Johan Otto Feisen	1729—1758	Textile merchant	
Jacob Severin	1729—53	Merchant	President
Peder Arvedsen	1730—1749	Icelandic merchant	
Peder Clausen Olrog		Brewer	
Iver Grøngaard	—1739		Councilman.
Henrik Weje	—1744	Merchant (urtekræmmer)	
Andreas Munch	—1747	Brewer	
Christoffer Frederik Wriesberg		Textile merchant	
Daniel Lindeman	—1738	Wholesaler (grosserer)	
Jens Wandel	1738—	Merchant	
Tønnes Bekker	1738—	Timber merchant	
Peder Sørensen Møndrik	1739—1748	Brewer and merchant (hørkræmmer)	
Andreas Frie	1739—63	Merchant	
Rasmus Sternberg	1739—1748		
Kjeld Wendal	—c. 1730	Wholesaler	
Otfo Lerche	1730—44	Brewer	
Clemmen Michael Blichfeldt	1730—	Brewer	
David Johan Berenlz	1732—55	Merchant (hørkræmmer)	President. Councilman.
Nicolaus von Hulten	mer, 1732—1751	Ironmonger	
Hans Henrik Bech	1732—4179	Merchant (hørkræmmer)	
Joakim Cracowitz	1732—1748		
Thor Andersen Nyegaard	1732—53	Brewer	
Hans Brechtwalt	—c. 1733		
Johan Henrik Schlichtkrul	1734—1742	Brewer	
Peler Timmerman	1734—1752	Wine merchant	
Poul Munchgaard Liunge	1734—1748	Merchant (urtekræmmer)	
Poul Nyegaard	1734—1757	Wine merchant	
Jens Gregersen Klilgaard	1734—49	Merchant	President. Councilman.
Christian Feddesen	1740—1755	Merchant (urtekræmmer)	
Hans Henrik Garben	1740—1764	Textile merchant	
Hans Munch	1740—55	Icelandic merchant	President. Councilman.
Søren Jørgensen	1741—1749	Wholesaler (grosserer)	Councilman.
Niels Dinnesen	1741—1753	Brewer	
Steffen Heger	1742—1745	Brewer	Councilman.
Rasmus Holm	1742—1744	Brewer	Councilman.
Thomas Carstensen Bargum	, 1744—5175	Merchant	
Johan Mathias Bruns	1744—1762		
Lorentz Lorentzen	1744—1779	Rextile merchant	President.
Niels Titken	1745—1761	Merchant (urtekræmmer)	
Nikolaj Fincke	1745—1772	Brewer	Presuden6t.
Hans Christian Brock	1745—1763	Merchant (hørkræmmer)	
Rasmus Munch	1747—1781	Brewer	
Søren Elsegaard	1747—1757	Merchant	
Johan Christoph Willebrandt	1748—59	Textile merchant	President. Councilman.
Frederik Liunge	1748—1761	Brewer	President. Councilman.
Andreas Johan Andresen	1755—66	Merchant	President. Councilman.
Ole Beck	1755—62	Brewer and merchant	
Andreas Bundsen	1755—1772	Brewer and merchant	
Didrik Munch	1748—1764	Merchant	
Sejer Olrog	1748—1749	Brewer	
Peter Casse	1748—1760	Merchant	Councilman.
Johan Jegind	1748—1753	Timber merchant	
Jakob Klog	1749—1753	Merchant (hørkræmmer)	
Lars Flindt	1749—1761	Brewer	
Hans Kielman	1749—1755	Merchant (urtekræmmer)	Notary.
Peter Bortman	1749—1857	Timber merchant	
Jodocus Henrik Mundt	1751—1772	Textile merchant	Notary.
Børge Knap	Brewer		
Thomas Rohde	1752—1766	Wine merchant	
Jens Rasmussen	1752—1764	Brewer	
Niels Schiøtz	1752—1769	Merchant (urtekræmmer)	
Hans Kinkel	1753—1767	Wine merchant	
Peter Kobl	1753—1772	Merchant (urtekræmmer)	
Christian Rosenberg	1753—1774	Rextile merchant	
Frederik Barfred	1753—1766	Wine merchant	
Jens Esmarch	1753—1759		
Jakob Rohde	1755—	Wine merchant	
Holger Foss	1755—1772	Wine merchant	
Andreas Jensen Slorp	1755—1759		Councilman.
Adtzer Adtzersen	1757—1772	Canvas merchant	
Jens Laussøe	1757—1777	Merchant (hørkræmmer)	
Schønning Andersen	1757—1772	Brewer	
Svend Købke	1759—1771	Merchant (urtekræmmer)	Councilman.
Peter Bone	1759—1761	Merchant	
Johan Peter Suhr	1759—1761	Merchant	Councilman.
Mathias Jørgensen Hundevadt	1760—1771	Textile merchant	Councilman.
Poul Christian Freese	1760—1781	Ironmonger	President. Councilman.
Ole Mandix	1761—1768		
Peder Huulegaard	1761—1769	Merchant (hørkræmmer)	
Michael Skibsted	1761—1775	Brewer and wholesaler (grosserer)	
Peter Hansen Svane	1761—1776	Merchant (hørkræmmer)	
Christian Lund	1761—	Ironmonger	
Søren Jensen Cramer	1762—1770	Wholesaler (grosserer)	
Hans Christian Bech	1762—1871	Wholesaler (grosserer)	Notary. Councilman.
Peter Nicolaj Schiølt	1763—1764		
Didrik Beckman	1763—1776	Brewer	President.Councilman.
Christian Falch	1771-1772	Merchant (urtekræmmer)	
Hans Kjærumgaard,	1772—1889	Merchant (urtekræmmer)	Councilman.
Anders Poulsen	1772—1789	Merchant (hørkræmmer)	
Jens Sønnichsen	1764—77	Wholesaler (grosserer)	Notary.
Jørgen Thulstrup	1764—71	Timber merchant	Councilman.
Hans Lange	1764—1775	Merchant (hørkræmmer)	
Jens Wedege	1765—1791	Brewer and wholesaler	President.
Jens Andersen Møller	1766—1772	Brewer	
Adam Plum	1767—1782	Vintapper	
Christen Nielsen Waage	1767—1771	Merchant (hørkræmmer)	Councilman. Member of Struense's Magistracy.
Aage Kaasbøll	1767—1782	Wine merchant	President. Councilman.
Michael Lange	1768—1771	Brewer	Member of Struense's Magistracy.
Morten Munch	1768—1770	Wholesaler (grosserer)	Councilman.
Søren Lange	1769—1794	Brewer	President.
Vilhelm Klingberg	1769—1772	Wine merchant	
Andreas Thomsen	1770—1776	Merchant (urtekræmmer)	
Christen Hansen	1770—1810	Wholesaler (grosserer)	President
Philip Christian Vette	1772—1805	Textile merchant	President.
Peder Lange	1772—1789	Brewer	
Peter Fenger	1772—1774	Wholesaler (grosserer)	
Olaus Baadt	1772—1783	Brewer	Councilman.
Peter Thomsen	1772—1788	Rextile merchant	Councilman.
Andreas Christian Lund	1772—1798	Merchant (hørkræmmer)	
Hans Biering	1772—1792	Merchant (urtekræmmer)	
Octavius Holman Baadt	1772—1800	Ironmoger	
Thomas Wissing	1772—1788	Wine merchant	Councilman.
Jens Hansen	1772—79	Brewer	Councilman.
Johann Ludvig Zinn	1772—1802	Wholesaler (grosserer)	
Jens Lauridsen	1772—1802	Wholesaler and brewer	
Christian Ludvig Budlz	1772—1787	Wholesaler (grosserer) and brewer.	
Peder Falch	1772—1800	Brewer	Notary
Lars Larsen	1772—1807	Wholesaler (grosserer) and timber	President merchant.
Nikolaj Langheim	1774—77	Textile merchant	
Johan Georg Kopp	1775—1785		
Niels Brock	1775—1801	Wholesaler (grosserer)	
Jørgen Bech	1775—1816	Wholesaler (grosserer)	President.
Jens Mylius	1776—1790	Brewer	Councilman.
Jokum Schow	1776—1783	Wholesaler (grosserer) and timber merchant	
Waagen Lavridsen	1776—1795	Merchant (hørkræmmer)	
Andreas Lorentzen	1777—1806	Textile merchant	
Carsten Peter Casse	1777—1684	Merchant (urtekræmmer)	
Bent Hoftved	1777—1784	Btrert	
Otto Diderik Lorentzen	1779—1806	Textile merchant	
Laurentius Johannes Cramer	1779—1796		
Herman Læssøe	1781—1788	Merchant (hørlræmmer)	Councilman.
Peder Jacobsen	1782—93	Textile merchant	
Peter Christian Bøtker	1783—1802	Textile merchant	
Niels Wulff	1783—1793		Councilman.
Peter Jacobsen	1783—1793	Merchant (urtekræmmer)	
Carl Conrad Lund	1784—93	Brewer	Councilman.
Andreas Colstrup	1784—1800	Tomber merchant	
Andreas Skibsted	1785—1790	Brewer	Councilman.
Haagen Leed	1787—1796	Wine merchant	
Rasmus Kirketerp	1788—1801	Wholesaler (grosserer)	
Knud Christensen	1788—1795	Wholesaler	
Erich Erichsen	1788—1806	Wholesaler	
Christen Jacobsen	1789—98	Merchant (urtekræmmer)	
Johan Købke	1789—1816	Merchant (urtekræmmer)	President.
Søren Christian Sundorph	1789—1795	Merchant	
Peder Waagensen Gielstrup	1790—1808	Merchant (hørkræmmer)	
Axel Muller Mørck	1790—1808	Wholesaler (grosserer)	
Ludvig Henrik Thomsen	1791—1830	Textile merchant	President.
David Christian Emanuel Wulf	1792—1808	Brewer	
Andreas Jensen Hvidberg	1793—1801	Brewer	
Jens Lang	1793—1797	Wine merchant	
Børge Fogh	1793—98	Merchant (hørlræmmer)	
Johan Erik Glassing	1782—93	Wine merchant	
Jens Holbech	1795—1811	Merchant	
Thøger From	1795—1811	Merchant (hørkræmmer)	
Ole Bernt Suhr	1795—1815	Wholesaler (grosserer)	
Markus Golhardt Holm	1796—1803	Wholesaler )grosserer)	
Just Michael Aagaard	1796—1819	Merchant (urtekræmmer)	President.
Stephen Schrader	1796—1802	Wine merchant	
Jørgen Frederik Bech	1798—1807	Brewer	
Jens Christoffer Friborg	1798—1831	Merchant (urtekræmmer)	
Ole Jørgensen Holgaard	1798—1803	Wine merchant	
Frederik Hammericb	1798—1806	Brewer	Notary. Councilman.
Christen Nielsen	1800—1807	Brewer and smith	
Jens Perch	1800	Wholesaler (grosserer)	
Johan Ditlev Liebenberg	1800—1811	Furrier	
Hans Wassard	1800—1819	Wholesaler (grosserer)	
Johan Martin Quist	1800—1817	Master mason	
Hans Friis	1801—1822	Qholesaler (grosserer)	
Hans Jessen	1802—1911	Merchant and sukphor acid manufacturer	
Hans Jørgen Lyngbye	1802—1721	Merchant (urtekræmmer)	
Johan Frederik Schultz	1702-1821	Book printer	
Alexander Momsen	Merchant		
Hans Christian Winther	1803—1830	Jeweller	
Jens Harboe	1803—1824	Wholesaler (grosserer)	President
Andreas Siem	1805—1818	Master mason	
Frederik Bertelsen	1806—1912	Merchant (urtekræmmer)	
Jørgen Bech	1806—1811	Tobacco manufacturer	
Andreas Hallander	1806—1808	Master mason	
Peter Frederik Becher	1807—1824	Wholesaler (grosserer)	
Jens Lund	1807—1818	Wholesaler (grosserer)	
H. Weyle	1807—1820	Timber merchant	
Albrecht Ludvig Schmidt	1807—1917	Wholesaler (grosserer)	
Andreas Leisner	1808—1829	Wholesaler (grosserer) and brewer	
Lorentz Linde	1808—1809	Jeweller	
Lauritz Holmblad	1808—1816	Dyer	
H. Delffs	1809—1810	Master mason	
Johan David Vogel	1809—1919	Wholesaler (grosserer) and brewer	
Lorentz Petersen	1809—1917	Wine merchant	
J. P. Krehmer	1810—1822	Brewer	
Johan Adolph Bechmann	1811—24	Merchant	
Mads Jakob Tvermoes	1811—1817		
Henrik Thybierg	1811—40	Master carpenter	
J. Christian Prior	1811	Master smith	
Knud Sørensen	1811—1821	Wine merchant	
Erich Møller	1811—1824	Brewer	
Jens Mathias Lind	1811—1830	Bank manager	
Jens Jonas Weibel	1811—1838	Merchant (urtekræmmer)	
Henrik Holm	1816—1730	Merchant (urtekræmmer)	
Frederik Soliwedel	1816—1821	Ship captain and brewer	
Andreas Nielsen	1816—1840	Wholesaler (grosserer)	
J. Bech	1817—1818	Soap manufacturer	
P. Wedersøe	1817—1822	Qine merchant	
I. H. Lindstorff	1817—1823	Master tanner	
P. I. Friedenreich	1817—1840	Qholesaler (grosserer)	Bice President.
G. Schaper	1817—1840	Master mason	
Johannes Hammerich	1817—1840	Wholesaler (grosserer)	President
Jørgen Christian West	1818—1821	Master carpenter	
Jess Fæster	1818—1838	Master carpenter	
Johan Philip Weilbach	1818—	Sail maker	
1819—1840			
Jens Dahl	1819—1840		
Johan Frederik Zinn	1820—	Wholesaler (grosserer)	
Andreas Seidelin	1820—1840	Book printer	
Paul Michael Launy	1820—1835		
Hans Caspersen	1821—1840	Anchor smith	City Council member.
Johannes Fenger	1821—1929	Soap manufacturer	
Henrik Frederik Prælorius	Wholesaler (grosserer)	Vice President.	City council member.
Nikolaj Jacobsen	1822—1836	Textile merchant	
Siegfried Schmidt	1822—1823	Sugar manufacturer	
Johan Theodor Suhr	1830—1840	Wholesaler (grosserer)	City Council member,
Gollieb Sibbern	1831—40	Master mason	City Council member.
Peter Nagel	1831—1833	Qholesaler (grosserer)	
Henrik Marcussen	1831—40	Distiller	City Council member
O. F. Hagen	1831—1833		
Johan Christian Kerrn	1833—1840	Rimber merchant	City Council member.
Holger Peter Clausen	1824—1825	Wholesaler (grosserer)	
Peter Christian Knudtzon	1824—1835	Wholesaler (grosserer)	City Council member.
Johannes Bech	1824—1830	Tobacco menufaturer	
Christian Waagepetersen	1824—1835	Wine merchant	
Jens Hostrup Schultz	1824—40	Book printer	City Council member.
Jens Jakob Holm	1825—	Whilesaler (grosserer)	
Boe Lorentzen	1825—1838	Miller	
Hans Georg Christensen	1827—1833	Wholesaler (grosserer)	
Jakob Holmblad	1829—1837	Card manufacturer	
Flans Hinrich Schmidt	1830—1837	Textile merchant	
Henrik Gamst	1830—1840	Master smith	City Council member.
Hermann Christian Müffelmann	1830—1840	Wholesaler (grosserer)	City Council member.
Hans Peter Hansen	1834—1840	Wine merchant	City Council member.
Christopher Hedemann	1835—1740	Sugar manufacturer	City Council member.
Andreas Hansen Bjerre	1835—1840	Brewer	City Council member.
David Borgen	1835—1840	Wholesaler (grosserer)	City Council member.
F. Dunlzfeldt	1835—1836	Wholesaler (grosserer)	
Frants Peter Hagen	1835—40	Wine merchant	City Council member.
Knud Christian Mundt	1835—1840	Master saddler	
Johan Christian Lund	1835—1840	Textile merchant	City Council member.
Nicolai Jonathan Meinert	1836—1840	Wholesaler (grosserer)	City Council member.
Jens Hansen Lund	1837—1840	Textile merchant	City Council member.
Henrik Kyhl	1837—1740	Clockmaker	City Council member.
Peter Christian Hansen	1838—1740	Distiller	City Council member.
William Friedrich Dunlzfeldt	1838—1840	Wholesaler (grosserer)	City Council member.
Christian Frederik Rentzmann	1838—1840	Wholesaler	City Council member.
Alexander-Christian Øst	1838—1740	Wholesaler (grosserer)	City Council member.
Hans Carl Sager	1839—1840	Master baker.	City Council member.
Conrad Weidemann	1839—1840	Wholesaler (grosserer)	
