= Ny Kongensgade 7 =

Historic building in Copenhagen, Denmark

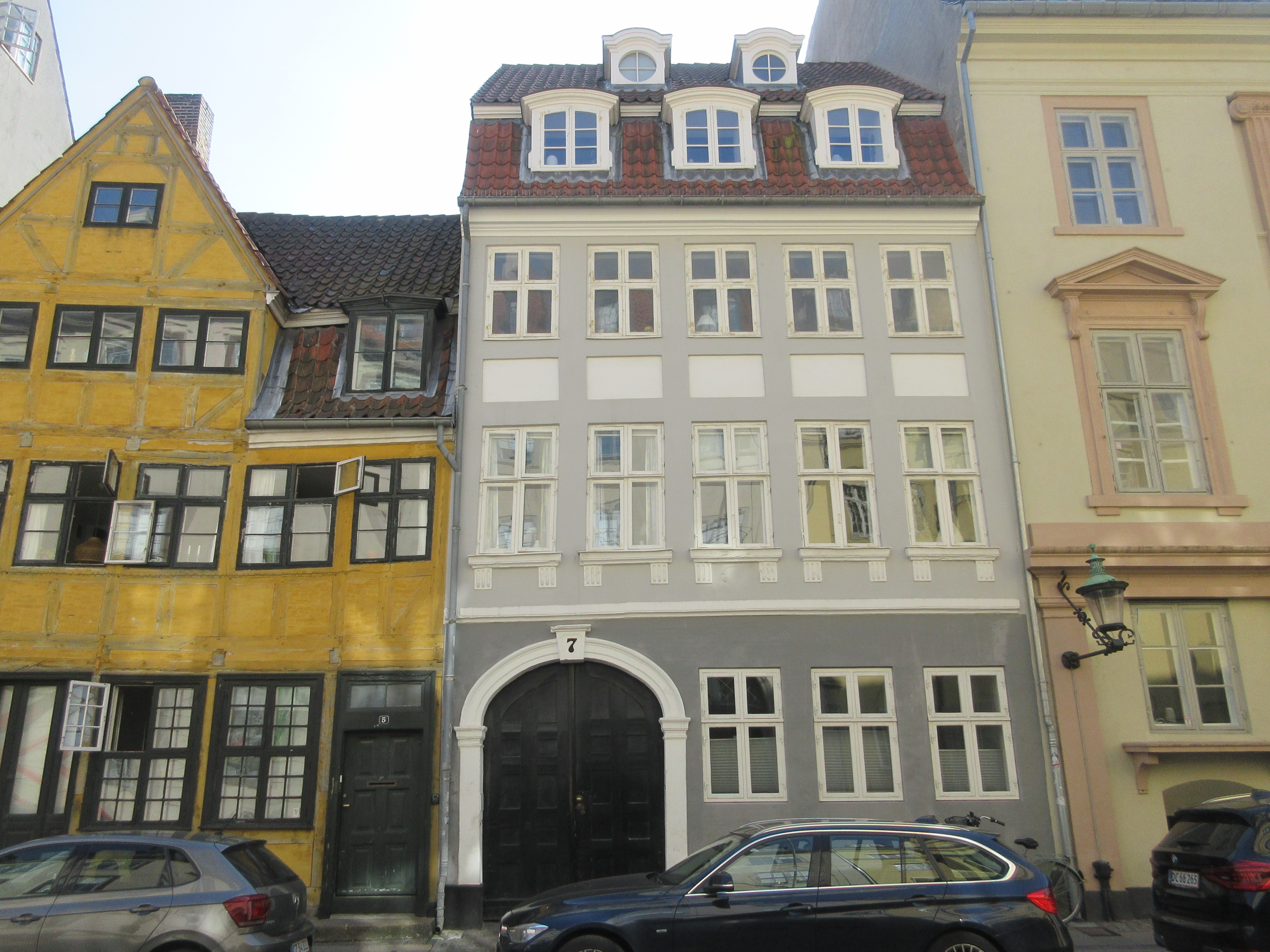
- Interactive map of the Ny Kongensgade 7 area

General information
- Location: Copenhagen, Denmark
- Coordinates: 55°40′25.6″N 12°34′36.03″E
- Completed: 1769

Ny Kongensgade 7 is a historic property in the small Frederiksholm Quarter of central Copenhagen, Denmark. It was listed on the Danish registry of protected buildings and places on 31 March 1931.

== History ==
=== 17th century ===
The house was built in 1769 for master stonemason Johan Friedrich Lohmann. Born in Hannover, Lohmann had come to Denmark in c. 1760 where he initially worked for royal stone carver Jacob Fortling. He became licensed as a master stone carver in 1766. Lohmann worked at the Royal Frederik Stone Quarry on Bornholm from 1779 but died the following year.

=== Collstrup family ===
In 1776, Lohmann sold the property to timber merchant Andreas Collstrup. He lived in the building for almost 30 years. In 1804, he moved to a newly built house at Holmens Kanal 10.

The property in Ny Kongensgade was listed in the new cadastre of 1806 as No. 333 in Western Quarter. It was still owned by Andreas Collstrop at that time.

In 1808, Collstrup ceded the property to his son Poul Andreas Collstrop (1782-). On 26 December 1805, he had married Louise MargretheSchack. In 1809, together with his brother Lauritz and his cousin Laue Jessen Maag, he was made a partner in his father's firm.

In 1812, Collstrop also bought the neighboring property Ny Kongensgade 5. He died on 28 December 1829. The two buildings were subsequently sold by his heirs.

=== 1840s ===
The writer Carl Brosbøll, better known under his pseudonym Carit Etlar, lived in the building as a student in 1848–49.

=== 1880 census ===
The property was home to 30 residents at the 1880 census. Ole Nielsen Kundby, a barkeeper, resided on the ground floor with his wife Stine Nielsen and two maids. Vilhelmine Hansen, who was the wife of a consul (no mention of her husband in the census records), resided on the first floor with her 13-year-old son Charles Hansen. Andreas Jørgensen, a smith, resided on the second floor with his wife Maren Petersen, two more smiths and a female lodger. Jens Hendriksen, a brewery worker, resided on the third floor with his wife Anna Christine Nielsen, their two children (aged four and nine) and two lodgers.

Frederik Ludvig Henrik Christoffer Hagrese, a horse trainer and sergeant, resided on the first floor of the rear wing with Martine Kirstine Ursine Hagrese and their one-year-old son, Peter Schønberg, a ship captain, resided on the second floor of the rear wing with his wife Anna Conelia Schønberg f. Duniels and their five children (aged 10 to 25). Peter Petersen, a coachman, resided on the third floor of the rear wing with his wife Anna Margrethe Petersen. Sophie Sommer, a widow seamstress, was also resident on the third floor of the rear wing.

== Architecture ==
Ny Kongensgade consists of three floors over a cellar and is five bays wide. A side wing, probably from the 1770s, extends from the rear of the building. A three-bay rear wing from 1813 was built for timber merchant Andreas Collstrup. The building was listed on the Danish registry of protected buildings and places on 31 March 1931.

== Today ==
The building contains apartments on all floors.
