= Nyhavn 49 =

Building in Copenhagen, Denmark

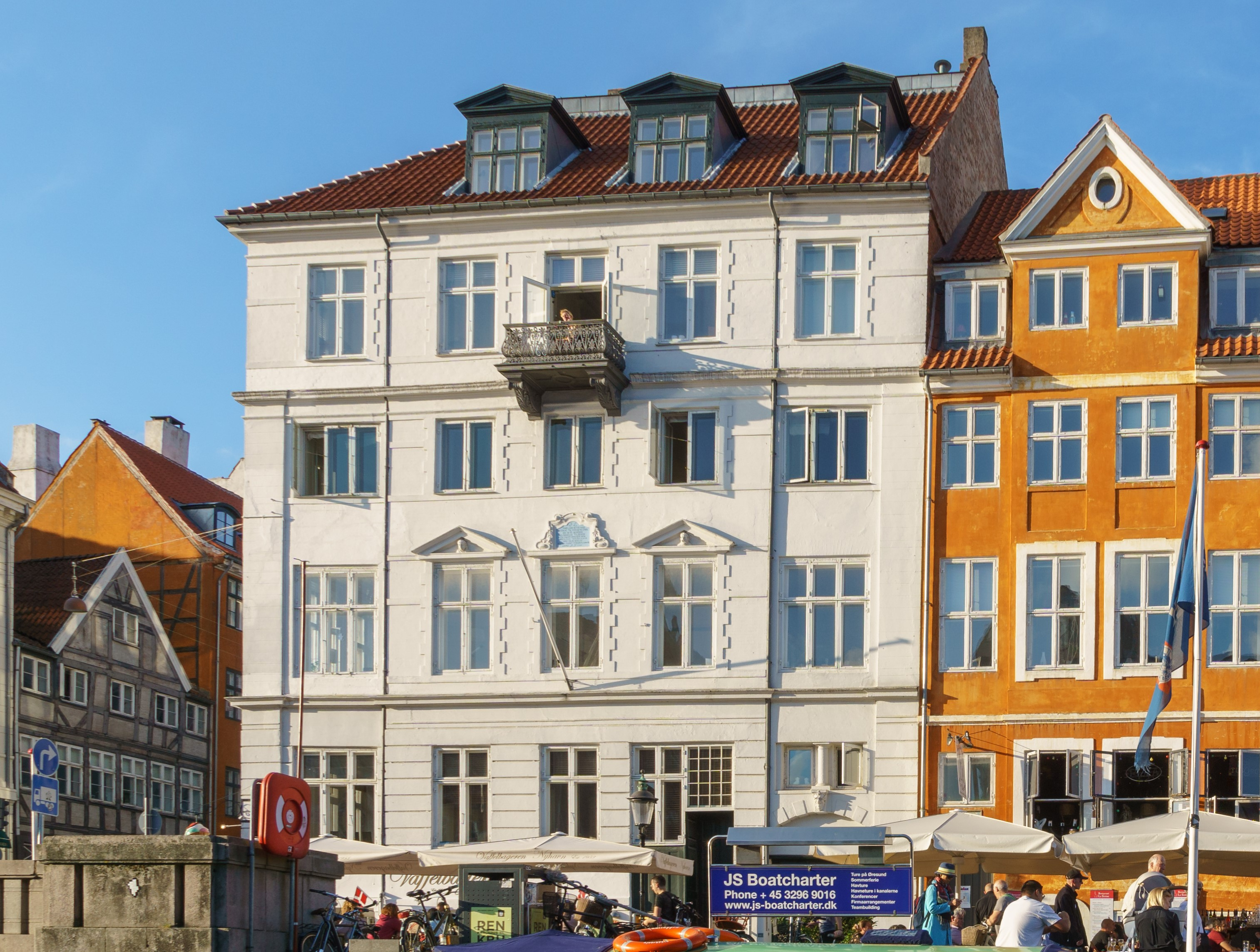
- The house seen from the other side of the canal
- Interactive map of the Nyhavn 49 area

General information
- Location: Copenhagen, Denmark
- Coordinates: 55°40′47.42″N 12°35′30.09″E
- Completed: 1689

Nyhavn 49 is a listed apartment building situated at the corner overlooking the Nyhavn Canal in central Copenhagen, Denmark. It originates in a two-storey townhouse from 1746 which belonged to the businessman and bank manager Rasmus Kirketerp from at least the 1790s and remained in the hands of the family until at least the early 1850s. This building was later heightened twice, first in the 1850s and then in 1887. The present building contains an ice cream parlour with homemade waffles in the basement and two residential apartments on each of the upper floors. It was listed in the Danish registry of protected buildings and places in 1945. Other notable former residents include the painter Otto Bache.

== History ==
=== Early history ===
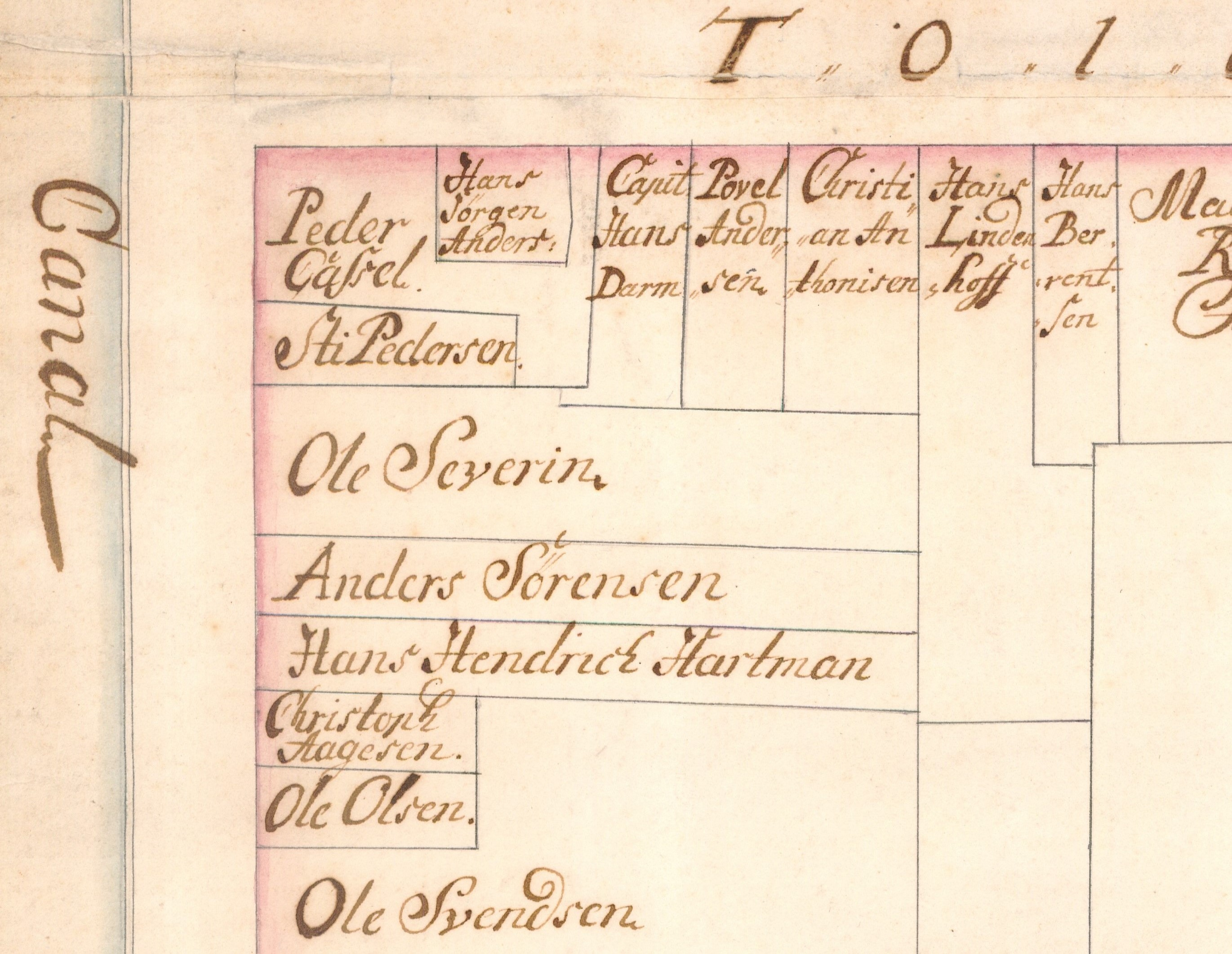
A detail from the 1731 plan with Peder Cassel's name written on the corner property

The site was originally part of two separate properties. One of them was by 1689 as No. 27 in St. Ann's East Quarter (Sankt Annæ Øster Kvarter) owned by Marcus Rotsteen. The other one was by 1689 as No. 28 owned by tanner Villum Lydersen. The present property emerged in 1730 when Toldbodgade (then Ny Toldbodgade) was extended to Nyhavn. A plan from 1731 indicates that it belonged to one Oeder Cassel at that time.

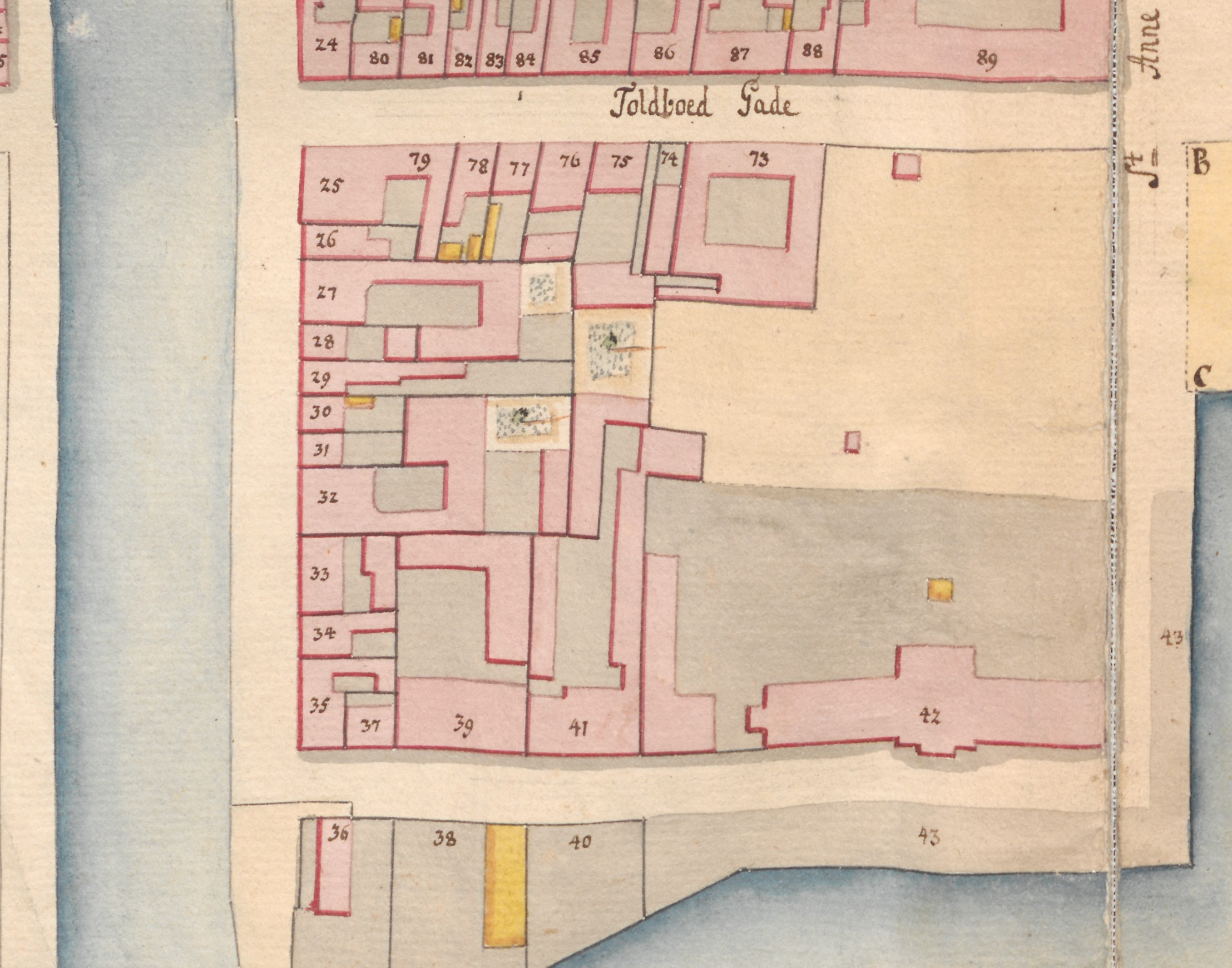
No. 25 and No. 79 seen on a detail from Christian Gedde's map of St. Ann's East Quarter, 1757

The present building on the site was constructed as a warehouse for skipper Jens Larsen in 1744–46. In the new cadastre of 1756, Lassen's property was still listed with two cadastral numbers, No. 25 and 79 in St. Ann's East Quarter, in spite of the fact that it had a single owner and that a single building stood on the site. The facade on Nyhavn featured a four-bay, rounded wall dormer with the date '1744' written above the windows. The facade on Toldbodgade featured a crow-stepped gable.

=== Kirketerp family ===
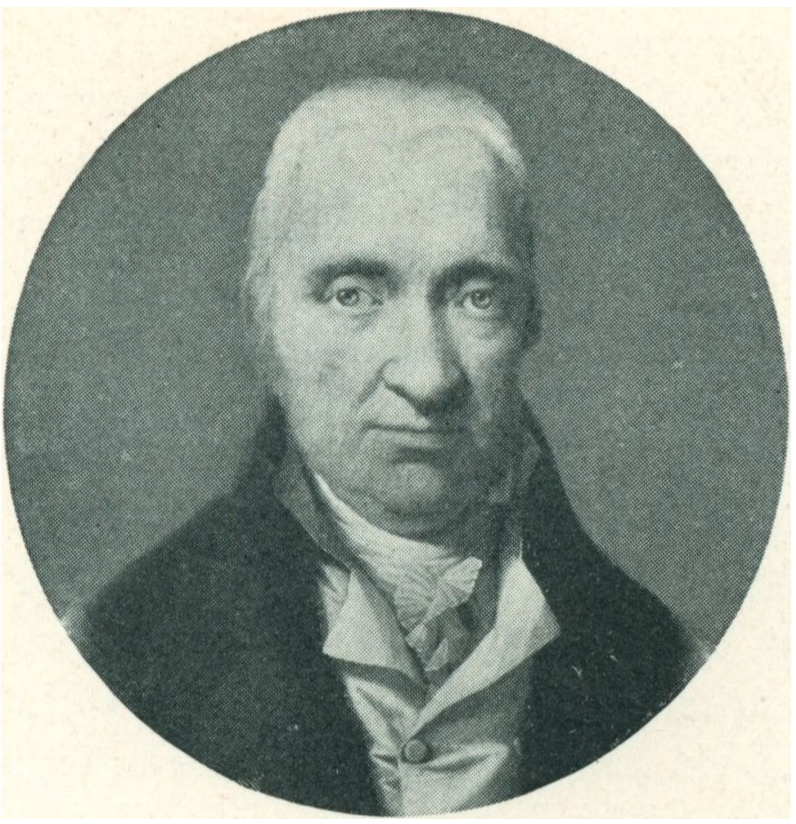
Rasmus Kirketerp

The property was later acquired by merchant (grosserer) and bank manager Rasmus Kirketerp (1747-1830). At the time of the 1801 census, he resided in the building with his wife Elisabeth (née Bechmann) and their five children (aged six to 18), an office clerk, a coachman, a caretaker, a chamber maid (husjomfru) and three maids.

In the new cadastre of 1806, Kirketerp's property was again listed as No. 25 in St. Ann's East Quarter. He died in 1830.

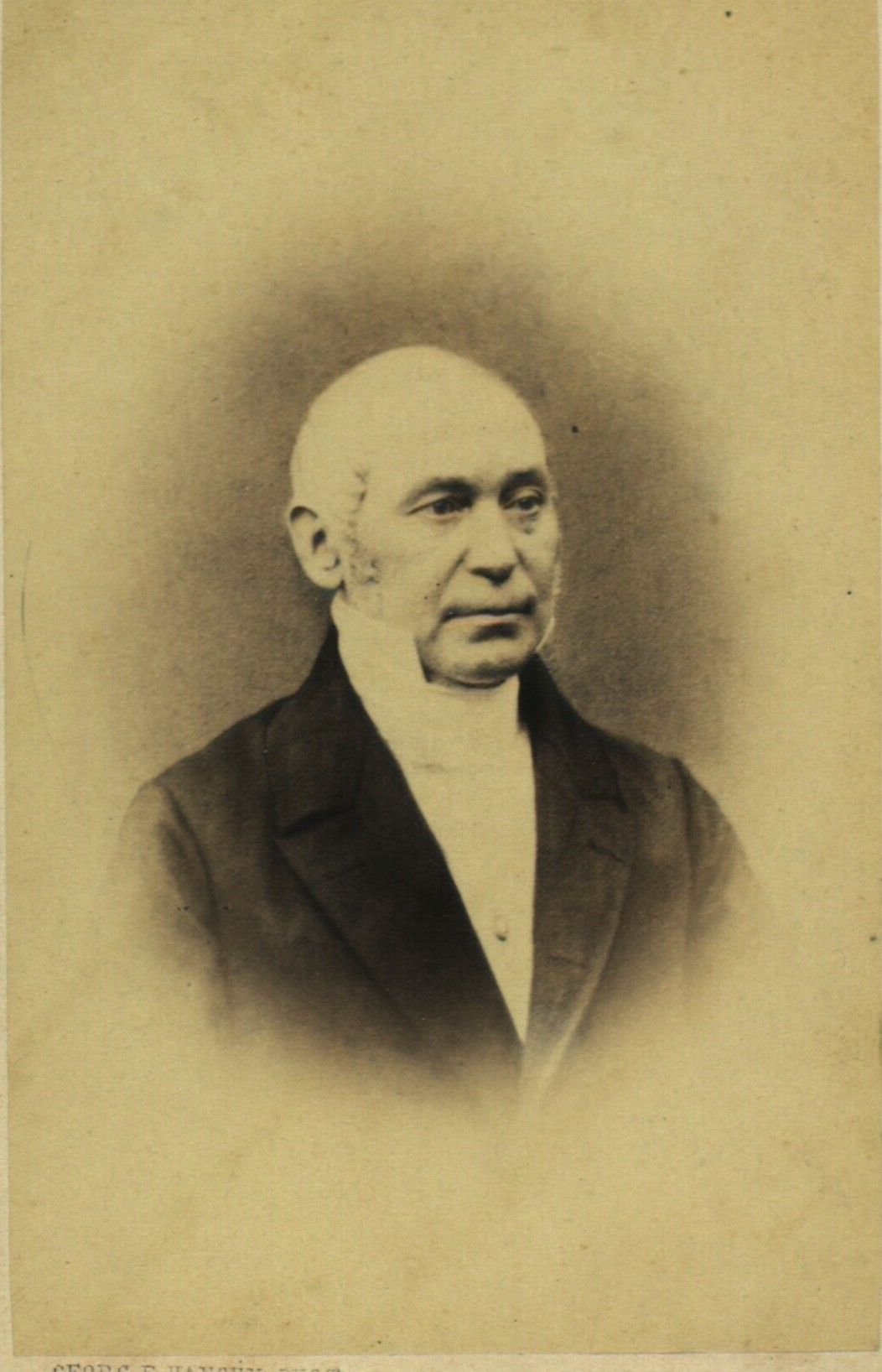
Carl Frederik Uthicke (1799-1863)

At the time of the 1834 census, Elisabeth Kirketerp resided on the ground floor with her 47-year old daughter Sidsel Magretha Kirketerp, a chamber maid (husjomfru), a male servant and two maids. One of her sons, Niels Kirketerp (1785-1855), a merchant (grosserer), resided on the second floor with his wife Erlandsine Frideriche Kirketerp (née Wandel, 1796-1855; daughter of regiment surgeon Andreas Carl Wandel, their five children (aged two to 11), the bookkeeper Søren Hastrup, a male servant and two maids.

The property was home to two households at the 1840 census. Niels and Erlandsine Kirketerp resided on the first floor with their five children (aged three to 16), husjomfru Elise Christ. Lund, a housekeeper, two male servants and two maids. The 53-year-old Sidsel Magrete Kirketerp (needlework) resided on the ground floor with the 25-year-old clerk Rasmus J. Wandel and two maids.

The property was again home to two households at the 1850 census. Niels Kirketerp resided on the first floor with his wife Erlandine Frederca Kirketerp, four of their children (aged 15 to 26), bookkeeper Søren Hastrup and one maid. The businessman (grosserer) Carl Ferdinand Uthicke resided on the ground floor with his wife Marie Uthicke and one maid.

=== 1860–1900 ===
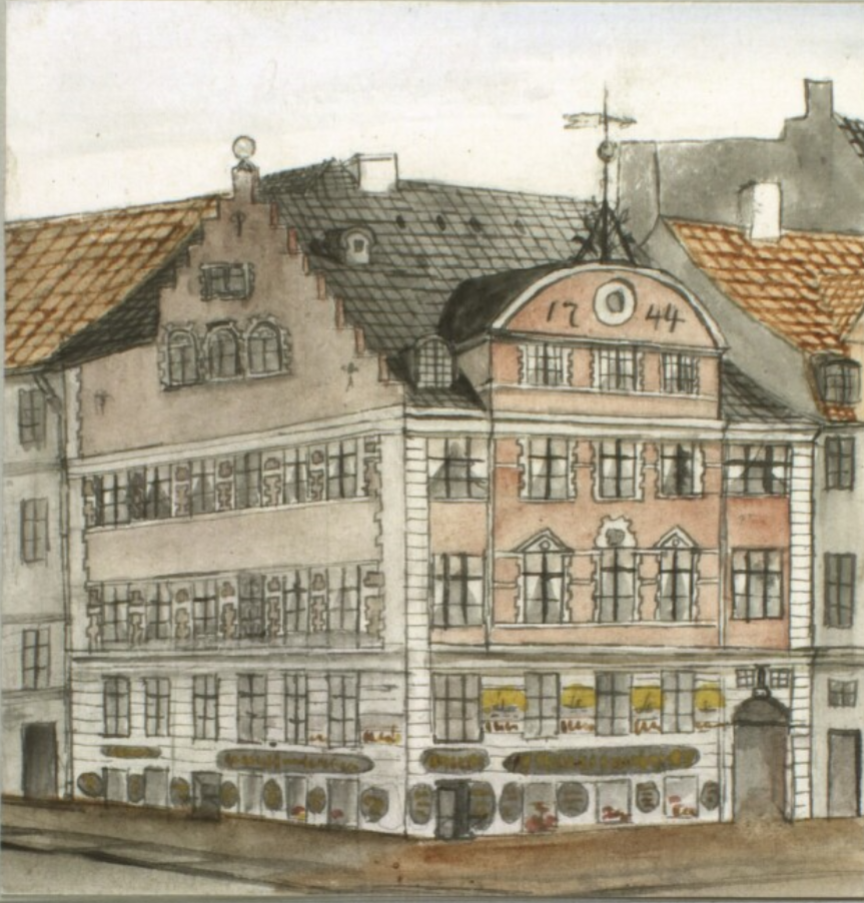
The building in 1884

The property was home to four households at the 1860 census. Christen Jensen Bjørnstrup, a distiller, resided in the building with his wife Laura Bjørnstrup (née Thuren), their three children (aged seven to 14) and one maid. He had previously (1845) operated a distillery in Adelgade (St. Ann's West Quarter, No. 379). The businessman (grosserer) Waldemar Hayden Waagepetersen (1828-1864; son of wine merchant Christian Waagepetersen) resided in the building with his wife Karen Alvilda (née Øckenholt) and one maid. The businessman Johan Christian Gerhardt resided in the building with his wife Marie Gerhardt (née Nielsen), three of their children (aged 23 to 29), a clerk, one male servant and one maid. Michael Christian Black, a merchant, was also a resident of the building (probably in the basement).

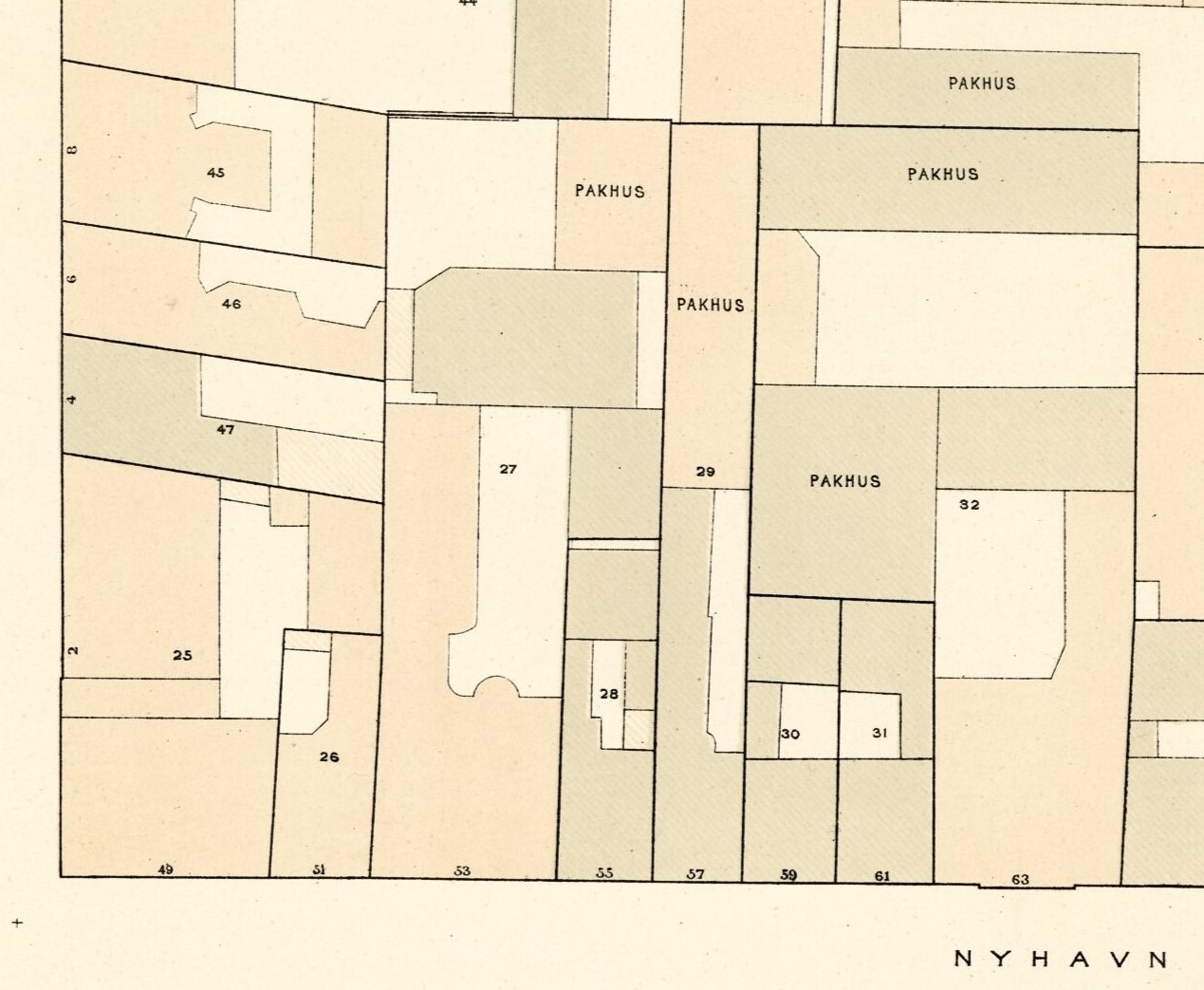
Nyhavn 49 seen in a detail from one of Berggreen's block plans, 1886-88

The building was home to just 10 residents at the 1880 census. Joullisse Margrethe Sørensen, a maid, resided on the first floor. The lack of other residents on the upper floors could indicate that the building was used as a hostel (or missing census records). Peter Julius Frederiksen, a concierge, resided on the ground floor with his wife Anna Sophie Frederiksen and their four children (aged three to 10). Charles Emil Hvilsom, a grocer (urtekræmmer), resided in the basement with his employee Carl Johan Borelli. Gottlieb Axel Rasmussen, another retailer, was also resident in the basement.

Georg Tetzlaff, a bookkeeper and CFO (økonomidirektør), resided on the first floor at the 1885 census. He lived there with his wife Thora Nathalia Jacobine Tetzlaff, two daughters (aged 22 and 27) and one maid.

The building was heightened with an extra floor in 1886. It was listed on the Danish Registry of Protected Buildings and Places in 132.

=== 20th century ===
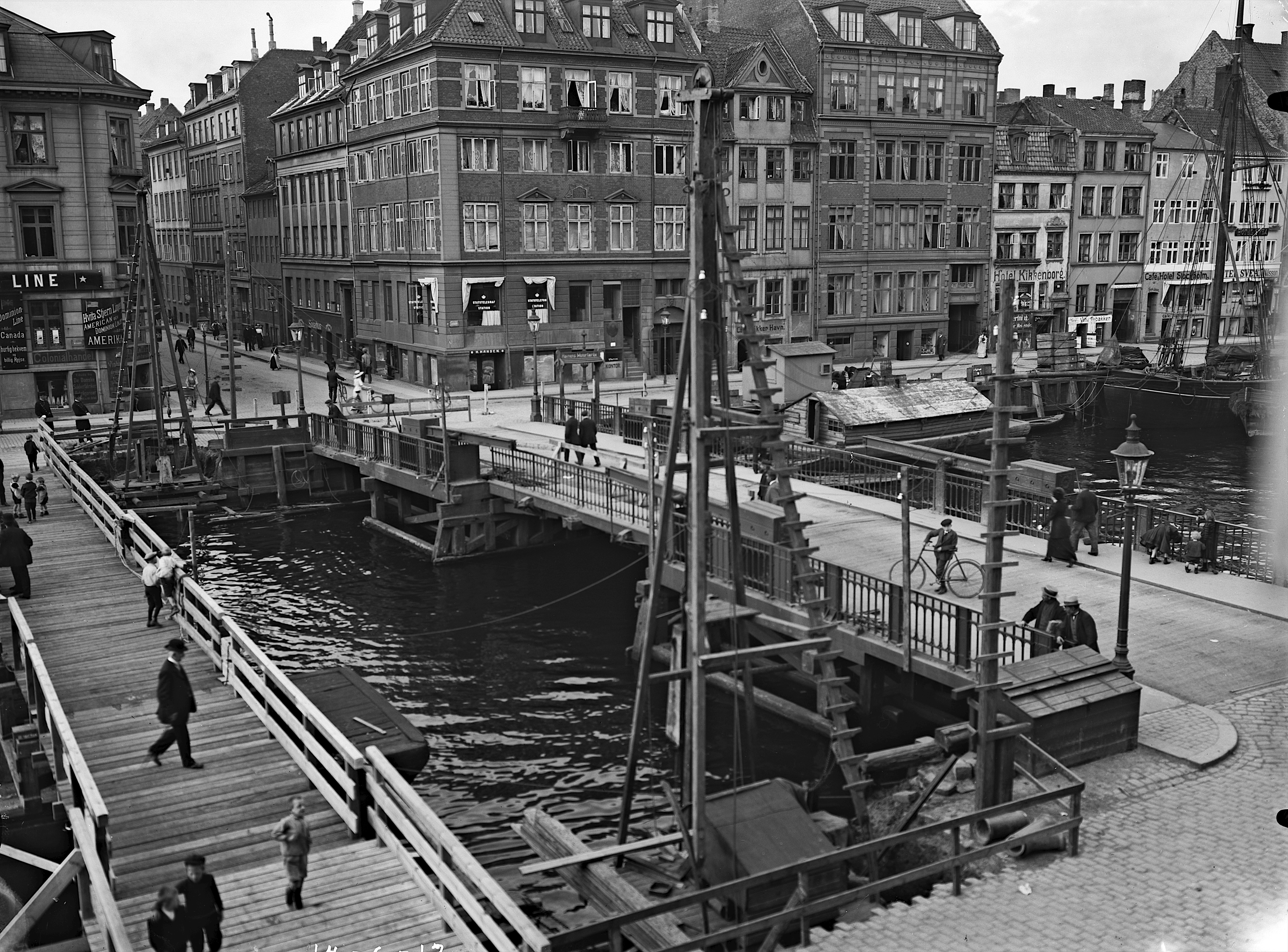
The building in 1884

The painter Otto Bache resided in the first floor apartment towards Toldbodgade (Toldbodgade 2) from 1900 to 1904.

The property was owned by businessman (grosserer since 1879) Hans Christian Holm (1748-) in 1908. He was the managing director of Københavns Grundejeres Renholdningsselskab and chairman of the board of representatives of Københavns Grundejerbank.

== Today ==
Vaffelbageren, an ice cream parlour with homemade waffles, has been located in the high basement since 1953. There are apartments on the upper floors.
