= Ny Vestergade =

Street in Copenhagen, Denmark

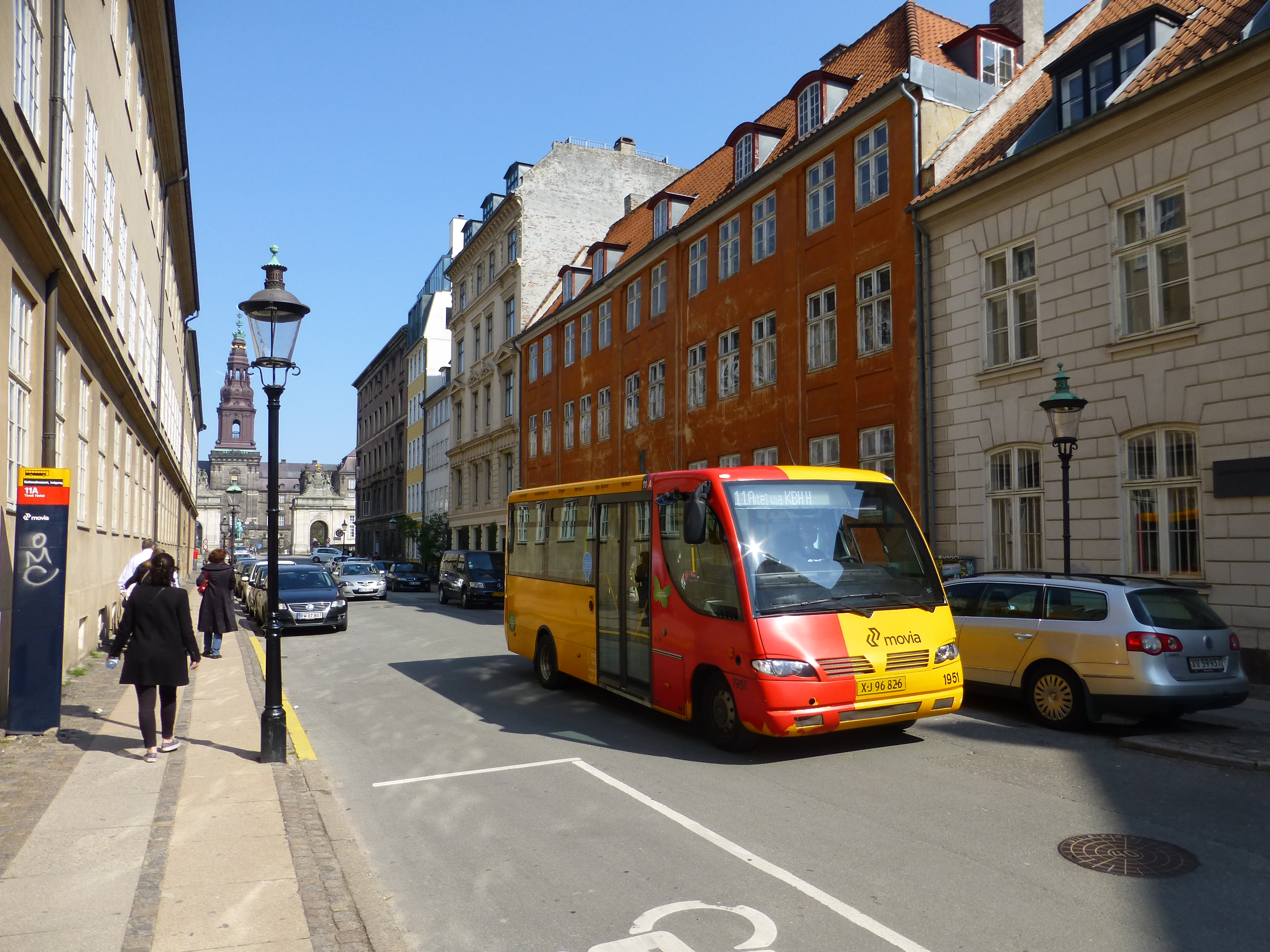
- Ny Vestergade with Christiansborg's tower visible in the background
- Length: 175 m (574 ft)
- Location: Copenhagen, Denmark
- Quarter: Frederiksholm Quarter
- Postal code: 1471
- Nearest metro station: Gammel Strand
- Coordinates: 55°40′27.62″N 12°34′30.83″E
- West end: Frederiksholms Kanal
- Wast end: Vester Voldgade

Ny Vestergade (lit. English: New West Street) is a street in central Copenhagen, Denmark. It runs from Frederiksholms Kanal to Vester Voldgade and together with Christiansborg's riding grounds, Marble Bridge and Dantes Plads forms an axis between Christiansborg's tower in the east and Ny Carlsberg Glyptotek's dome in the west. The National Museum's main entrance is located in the street. Ny Vestwrgade 9, Ny Vestergade 11 and Ny Vestergade 13 are listed on the Danish registru of protected buildings and places.

== History ==
Ny Vestergade is one of the streets that was created when the Frederiksholm neighbourhood was established in the 1660s. It was referred to as Den Nye Vestergade ("The New West Street") in 1665 but was long more commonly called Wigandts Gade after wine trader and ship owner Wigand Michelbecker (1636–1692), who owned a property where National Museum is now located. The name "New" refers to the old Vestergade, which extends westwards from Gammeltorv.

== Notable buildings and residents ==
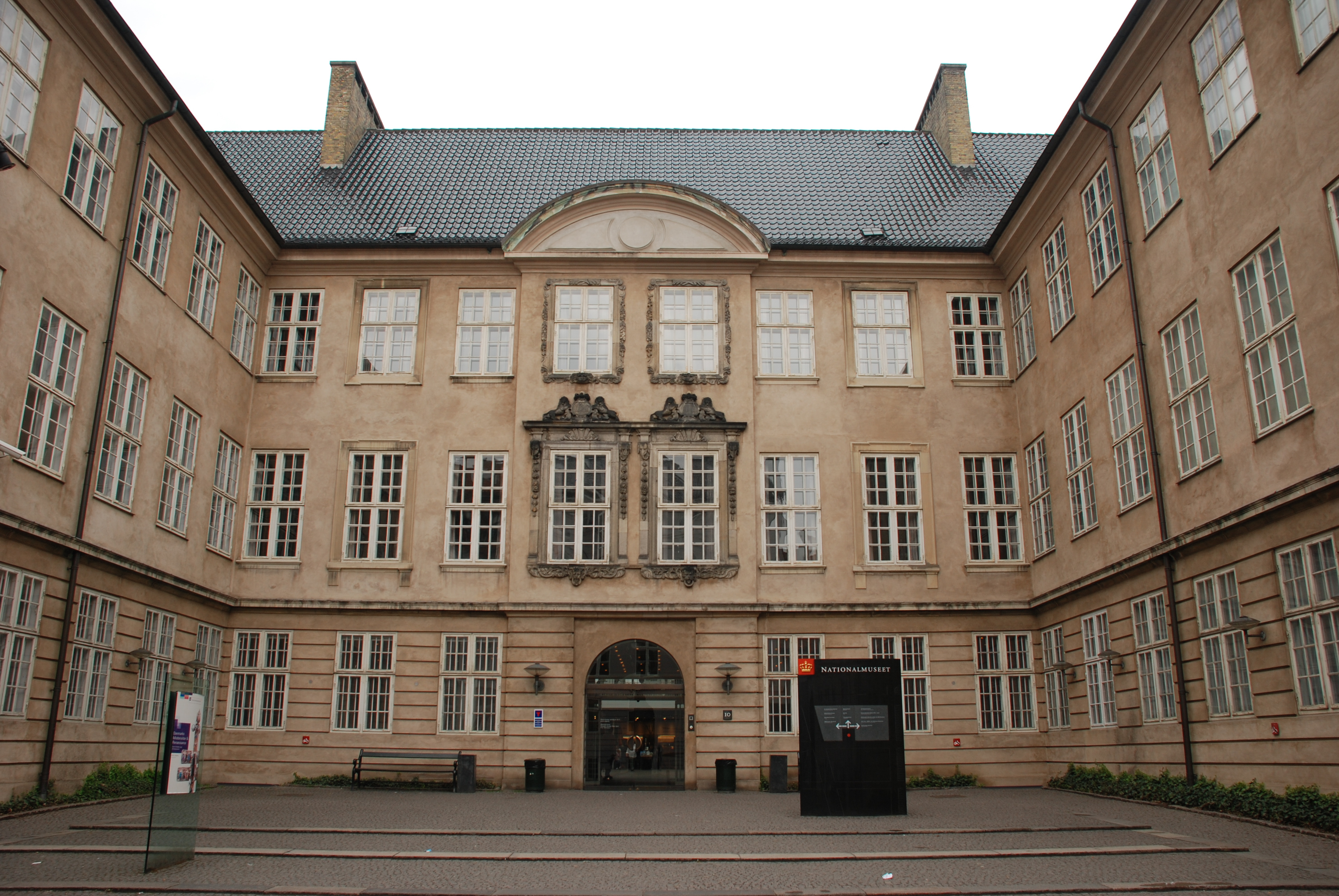
National Museum's main entrance

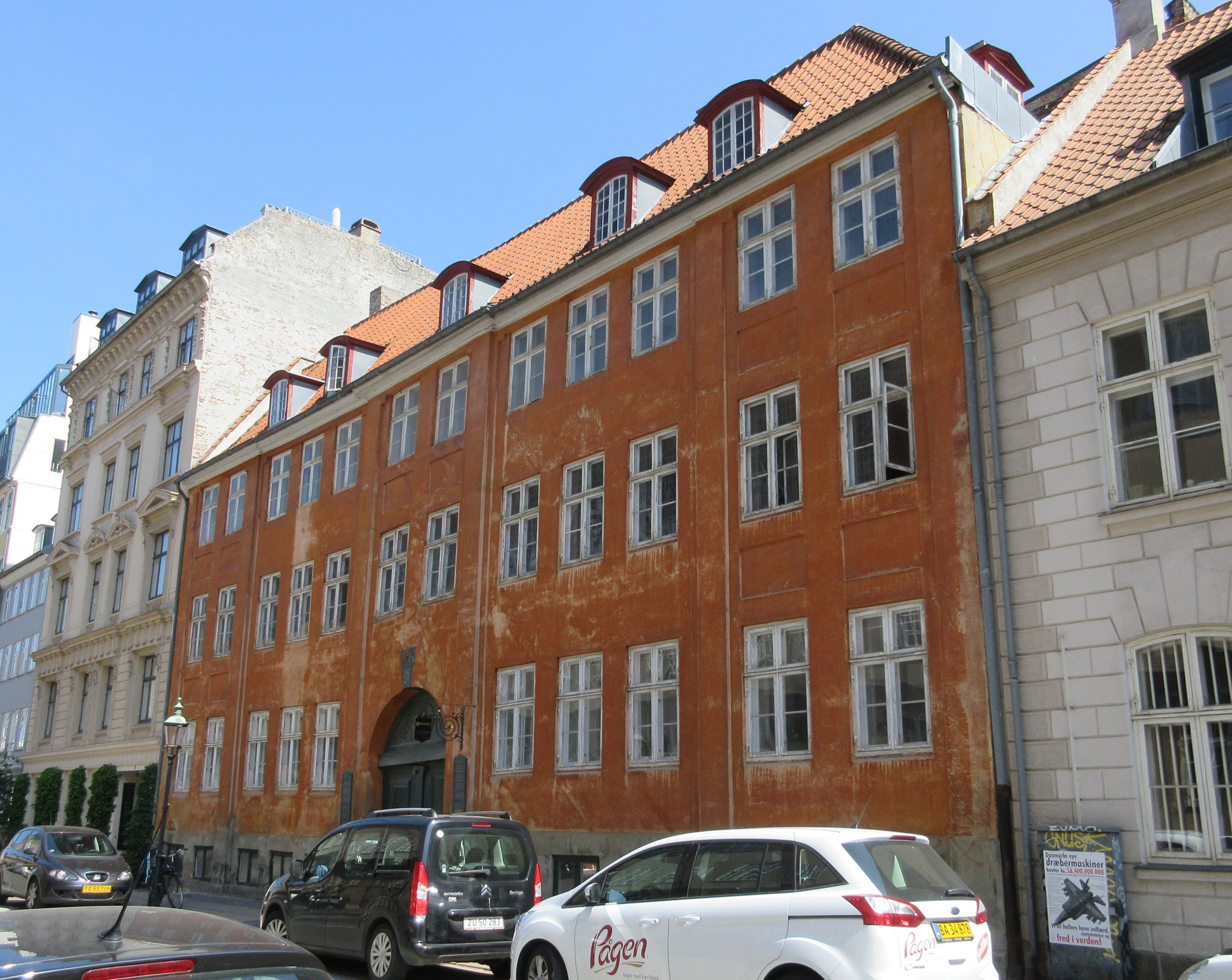
No. 9: Oldest house in the street

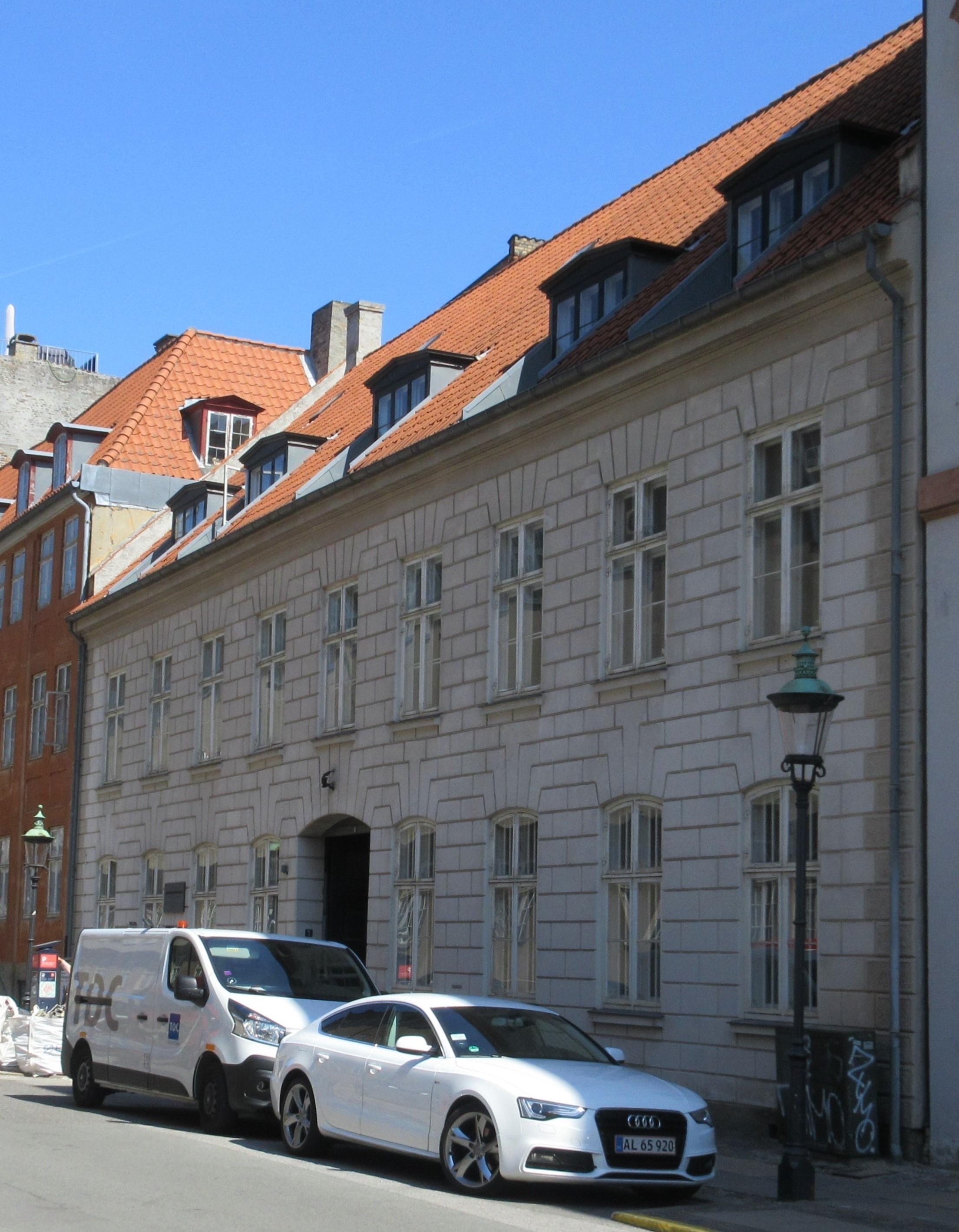
No. 13: Former home and workplace of August Krogh

The National Museum occupies the entire north side of the street. The recessed main entrance was created by Mogens Clemmensen, Arne Nystrøm and Gehrdt Bornebusch in connection with their expansions of the museum between 1929 and 1938.

No. 9, 11 and 13 are listed. Dating from some time before 1770, Ny Vestergade 9 is the oldest house in the street. The two-storey No. 11 was built as a combined storage house and stables for grocer I. Lund in 1831. The University of Copenhagen acquired the building in 1857 and it was subsequently adapted by Johan Henrik Nebelong in the Neoclassical style (1858). Nebelong also added a perpendicular rear wing (1859), which housed the university's chemical laboratory. A memorial plaque commemorates August Krogh, who lived and worked in the building from 1910 until 1827. No. 13 was built in 1793 for inn-keeper Christen Christensen Bording, probably by one of Caspar Frederik Harsdorff's pupils. A later owner, Christian Ludvig Maag, expanded the house with an extra floor in 1855–1857. Maag also commissioned Georg Hilker, P. C. Skovgaard and Constantin Hansen. Countess Danner had an apartment in the building. The building is now part of Dansk Arbejdersgiverforening's headquarters on Vester Voldgade.

== Public art and memorials ==
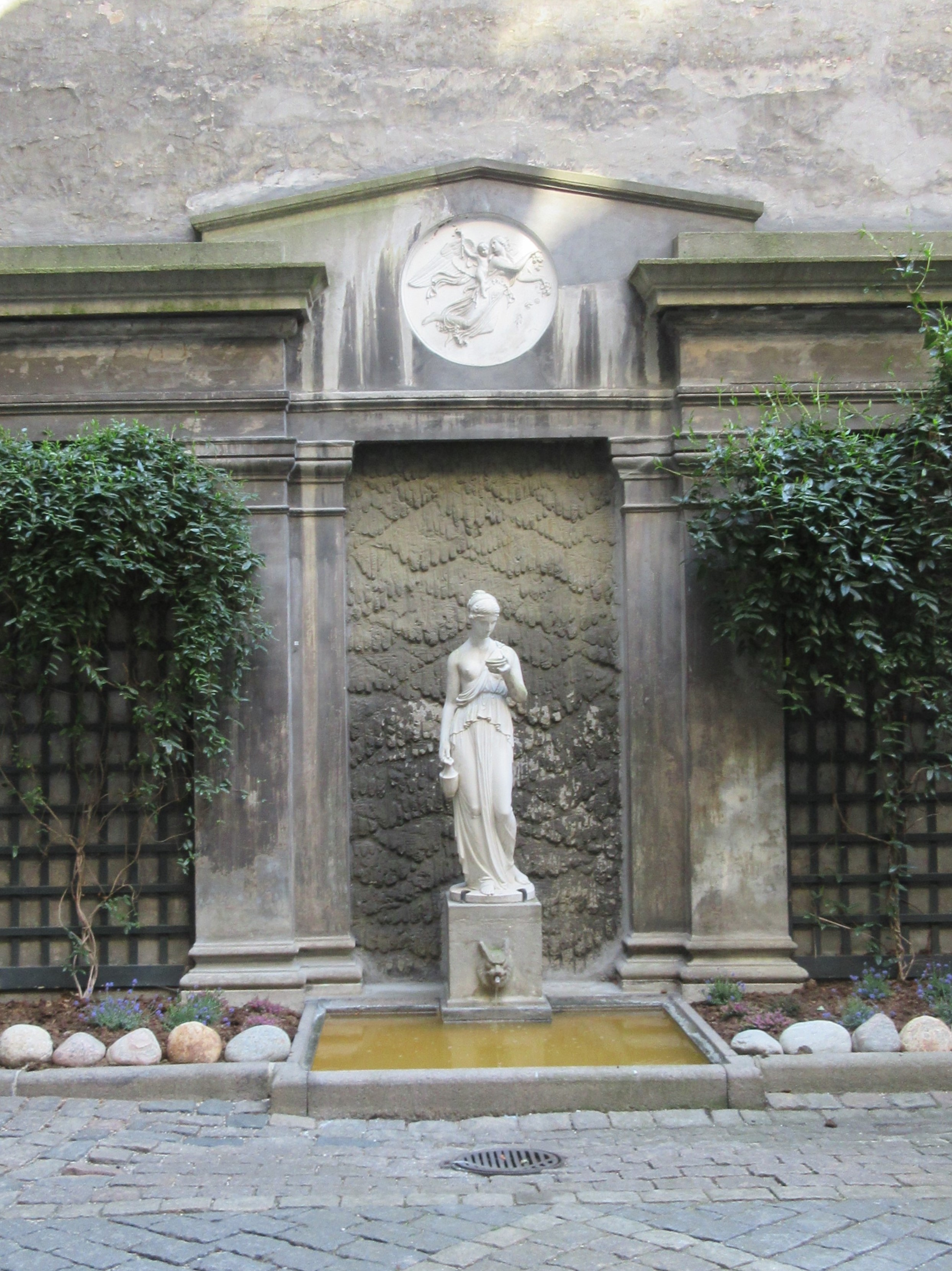
The water feature at No. 1

In the courtyard of Ny Vestergade 1 is a water feature with an antique statue. Above the statue is a round relief. The tableaux is visible through the gateway from the street. The walls of the gateway feature four more reliefs. The building is from 1870.

== See also ==
- Ny Vestergade 11
