= Ny Vestergade 13 =

Townhouse in Copenhagen, Denmark

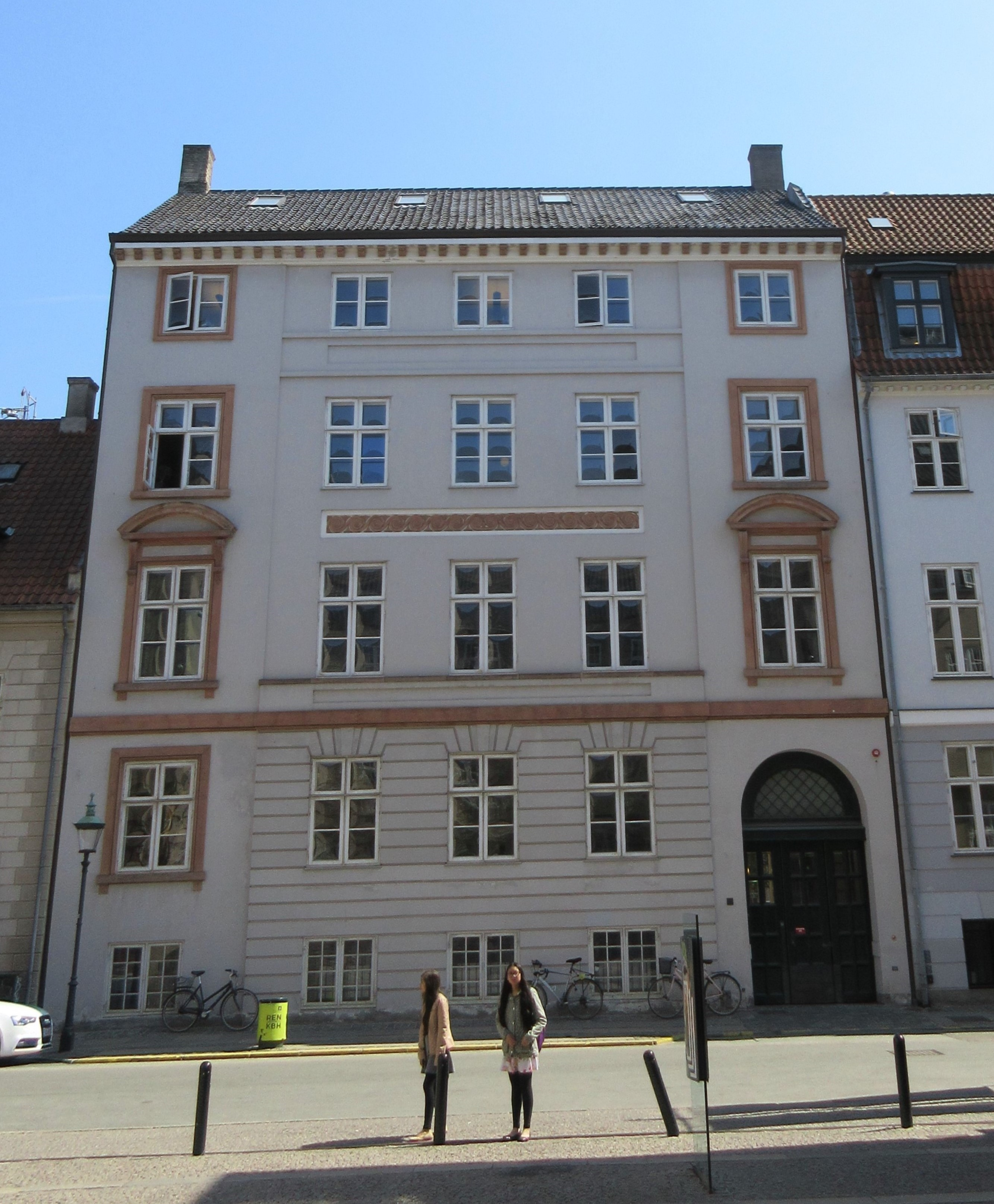

General information
- Location: Copenhagen, Denmark
- Coordinates: 55°40′26.94″N 12°34′30.22″E
- Completed: 1793

Ny Vestergade 13 is a Neoclassical townhouse located opposite the main entrance to the National Museum in central Copenhagen, Denmark. Countess Danner used it as a winter residence after Frederick VII of Denmark in 1863 while spending the summers at Skodsborg.

== History ==
=== 18th century ===
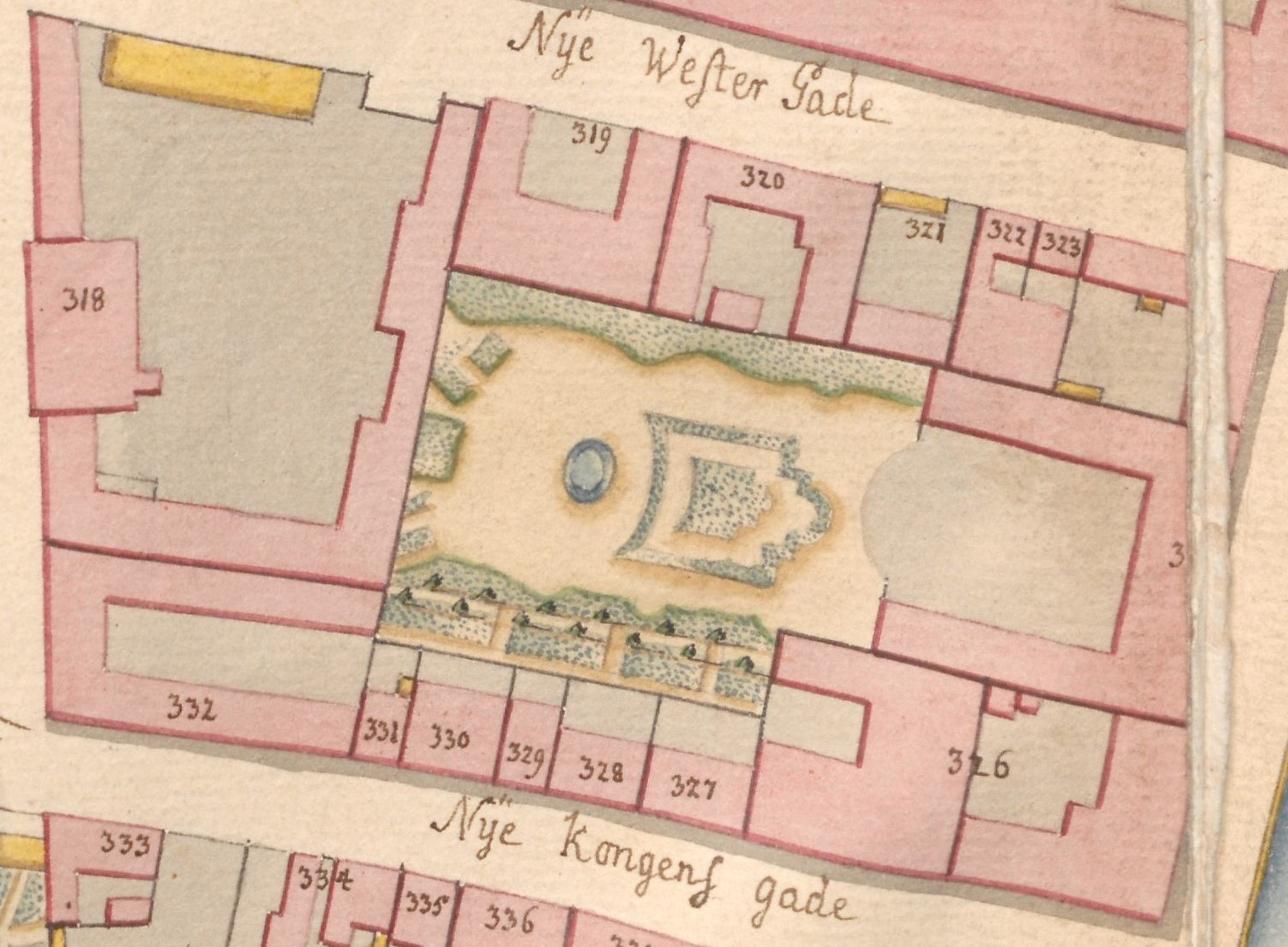
No. 318 seen on a detail from Christian Gedde's map of Copenhagen's West Quarter, 1757.

The site was originally part of a large property which comprised the entire western part of the block. This property was listed in the new cadastre of 1756 as No. 318 and belonged to Ulrik Frederik Edinger at that time. It was later divided into a number of smaller properties. The property was subsequently initially referred to as No. 318 E.

The present building on the site was constructed as a private residence for hotel owner Christen Christensen Bording in 1792–1793. The architect is not known but was probably one of Caspar Friedrich Harsdorff's students. Professor of theology at the University of Copenhagen Friedrich Münter (1761–1830) was a resident in the building in 1797–1798.

=== 1800–1711 ===
The property was listed in the new cadastre of 1806 as No. 215 in the West Quarter. It belonged to one etatsråd Eggers at that time.

=== Maag family ===
The property was acquired by timber merchant Laue Jessen Maag (born 1782) in 1811. In 1809, he had become a partner in his uncle Andreas Collstrop's firm. His cousin Poul Andreas Collstrop, another partner in the firm, owned the property Ny Kongensgade 7.

Maag had married his niece Mette Marie Sandorph (1784-1855) in 1808. She was the daughter of grocer Søren Christian Sundorph and Mette Christine Lauesdatter Maag.

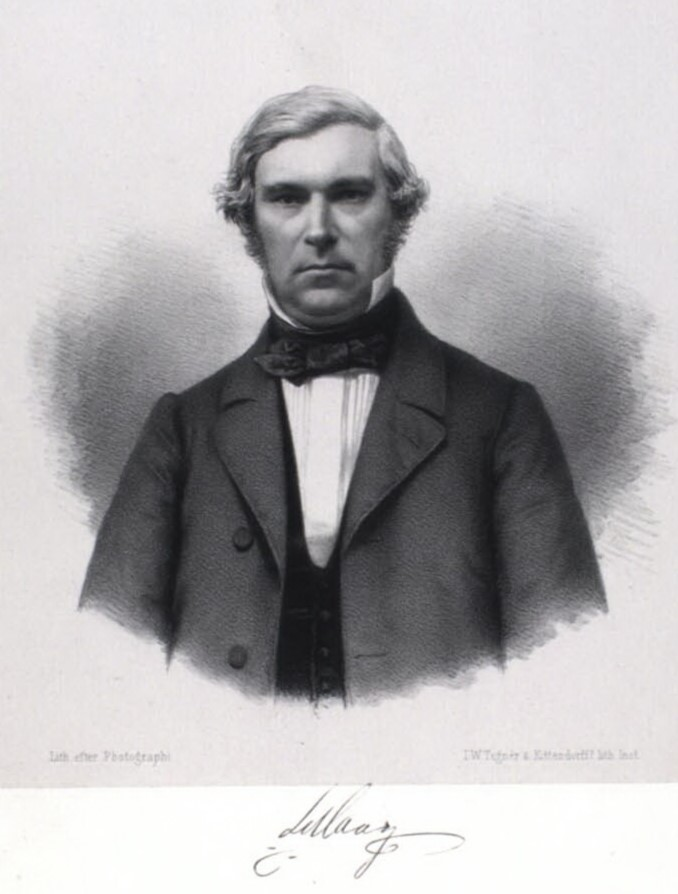
Christian Ludvig Maag

She kept the building until her death. The property was subsequently passed to their son Christian Ludvig Maag (1809-1861). In 1855-1857, he refurbished the building with the assistance of Michael Gottlieb Bindesbøll. The building was also heightened with one storey. The artists Georg Hilker, P. C. Skovgaard and Constantin Hansen were charged with interior decorations of the first-floor apartment. Hilker was a resident in the building for a couple of years after completing his work for Maag.

=== Countess Danner ===
In 1864, Ny Vestergade 13 was sold for 54,000 Danish rigsdaler to Countess Danner. It served as her city home until her death. The rest of the year was spent in her house in Skodsborg or at Jægerspris Castle.

=== 1668 census ===
The property was home to 32 residents in five households at the time of the 1880 census. Menca Koppel (1833–1904), a lawyer, resided on the first floor with his wife Fanny Rosalie Koppel, their seven children (aged three to 19), one male servant and three maids. One son was later editor-in-chief and politician Valdemar Koppel. Another son was the later bookseller Hans Koppel, father of designer Henning Koppel. Jens Frederik Nielsen, an office courier, resided on the first floor with his wife and their one-year-old son. Christian Rostgaard von der Maase, a military officer with the rank of colonel, resided on the second floor with his wife Caroline Amalie von der Maase, their four children (aged one to six), servants, a wet nurse and three maids. Carl Christian Frederik Calundan, a man in his 50s (no profession mentioned), resided on the third floor with his nephew Harald Vilhelm Minus Calundan and a housekeeper. Anders Jensen, a concierge, resided in the basement with his wife Johanne Jensen.

=== 20th century ===
Dansk Arbejdsgiverforening refurbished the building between 1975 and 1978 under the supervision of architect Preben Hansen (1908–1989) and in collaboration with the National Museum. The renovation received an award from the City of Copenhagen in 1980.

== Today ==
The building is part of the headquarters of Dansk Arbejdsgiverforening.
