= Ved Stranden 12 =

Historical building in Copenhagen, Denmark

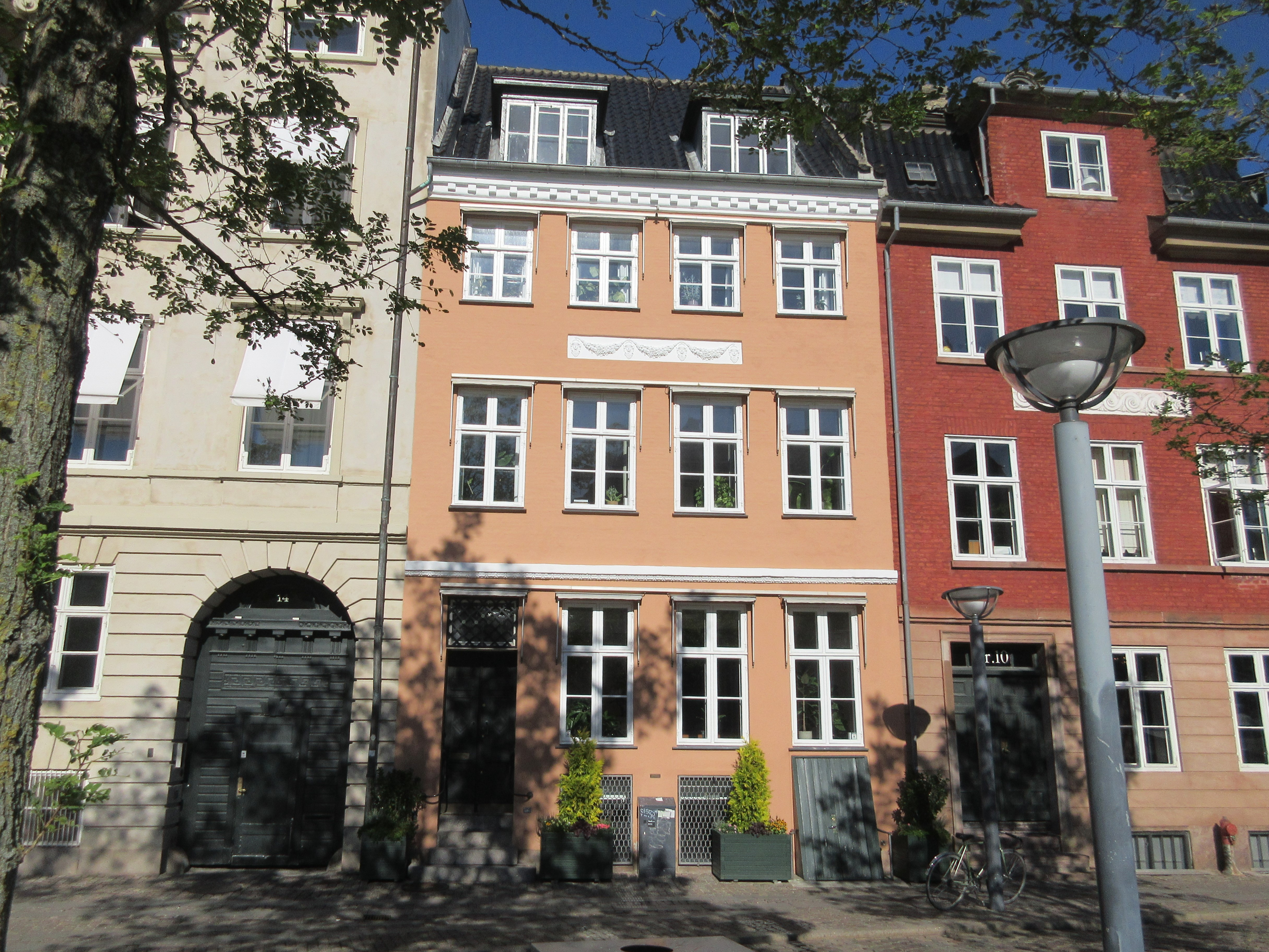
- Interactive map of the Ved Stranden 12 area

General information
- Location: Copenhagen, Denmark
- Coordinates: 55°40′38.57″N 12°34′53.33″E
- Completed: 1796

Ved Stranden 12 is a town house located opposite Christiansborg Palace in central Copenhagen, Denmark. The building was listed on the Danish registry of protected buildings and places in 1932. The building is flanked by the Gustmeyer House to the left (No. 14) and the Sundorph to the right (No. 10).

== History ==
=== Early history ===
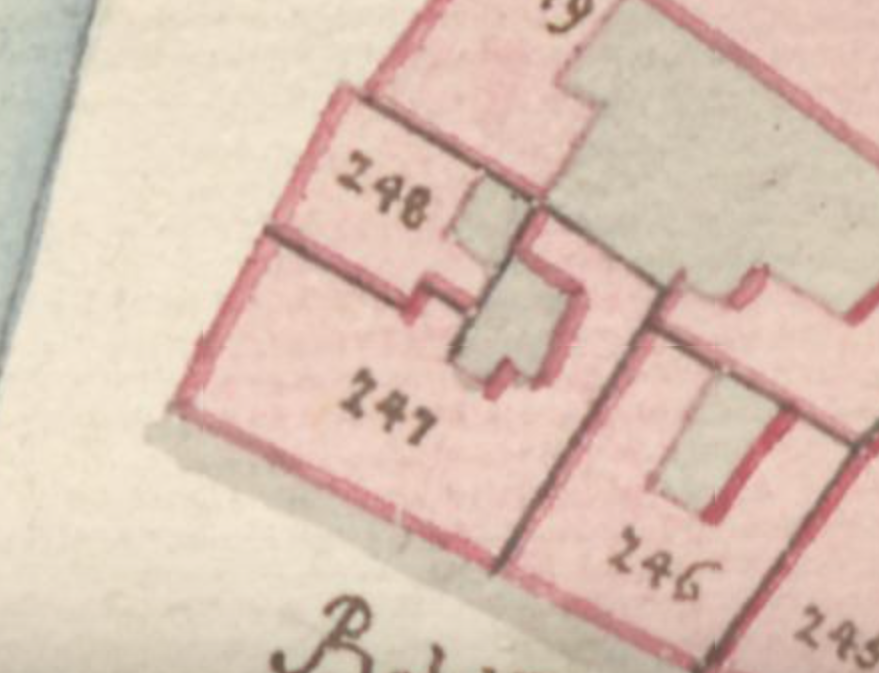
No. 248 seen in a detail from Christian Gedde's map of the East Quarter, 1757

Back in the 17th century, Ved Stranden 12 was part of the same property as Ved Stranden 10. The property was listed in Copenhagen's first cadastre of 1689 as No. 211 in the East Quarter, owned by grocer (urtekræmmer) Thomas Torsmide's widow. In 1756, it was as No. 248 owned by Christian Frederik Vesterholdt. He was also the owner of Kastrupgård and Kastrup Værk on Amager.

=== Dine Beate Solle ===
At the time of the 1787 census, the property was owned by Dorthe (Dine) Beathe Solle, widow of the surgeon Johan Christopher Solle. She operated a barber shop from the premises. She resided there with her four children, five employees and three lodgers. Another household consisted of the barkeeper Ellef Rejersen, his wife Else Magrethe, their daughter Ane Helene and a maid.

In 1779, Solle's son Johan Christopher Solle had succeeded his father as resident surgeon for the Royal Waisen House.

Solle's building was destroyed in the Copenhagen Fire of 1795, together with most of the other buildings in the area. The present building on the site was constructed for her in 1796.

The property was at the time of the 1801 census home to a total of 18 people. Solle was still living there with her four children, three employees and two maids. The property was in the new cadastre of 1806 listed as No. 155 and was by then still owned by Dine Bente Solle.

=== 1840s ===
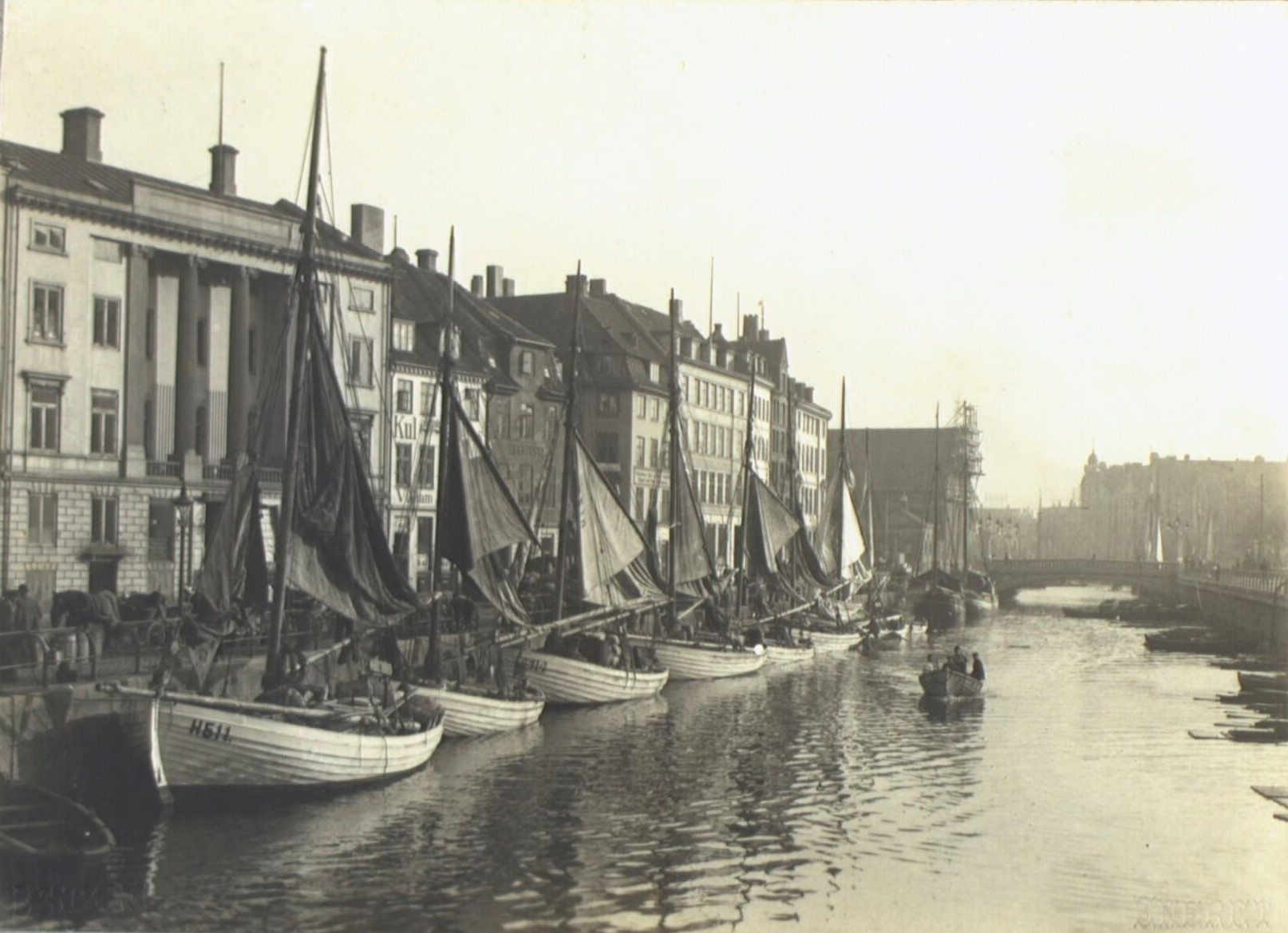
Ved Stranden 12 seen in a photograph by Fritz Theodor Benzen

The property was at the time of the 1840 census home to a total of 13 people. Actor at the Royal Danish Theatre Hans Peter Holm (c. 1794 - ) resided on the first floor with his wife, their three children and one maid. Anders Petersen Houlberg, a barkeeper, resided on the ground floor with one maid. Jens Jensen, a workman, resided in the basement with his wife, two children and one maid.

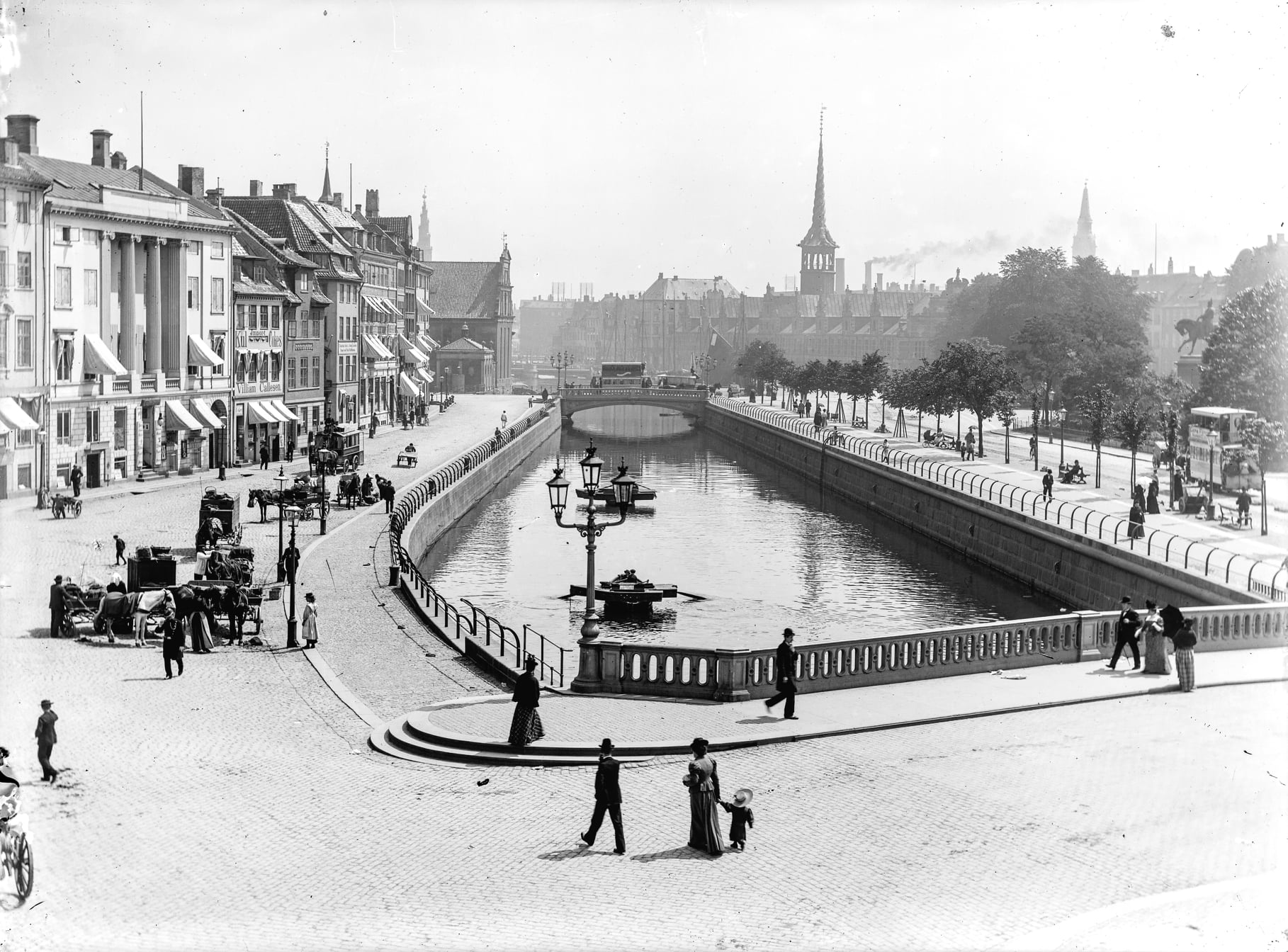
Ved Stranden 12 and the surrounding buildings viewed from Højbro.

The property was home to a total of 9 people at the 1845 census. Jacob Christian Blischou Hjorth, a merchant, resided alone on the second floor. Frederik Bendix Johannes Henriksen, a tobacco-maker, resided alone on the third floor. The barkeeper Anders Petersen Heulberg resided with a maid on the ground floor.

The property was at the time of the 1850 census home to a total of 13 people. Holm was still living on the first floor with his wife, two children and a maid. Carl Frederik Jensen, a master shoemaker, was now residing in the basement with his wife, niece and an employee. Ove Gotthilf Berger Bloch, a civil servant working for Kultusministriet, was residing on the second floor.

=== 20th century ===
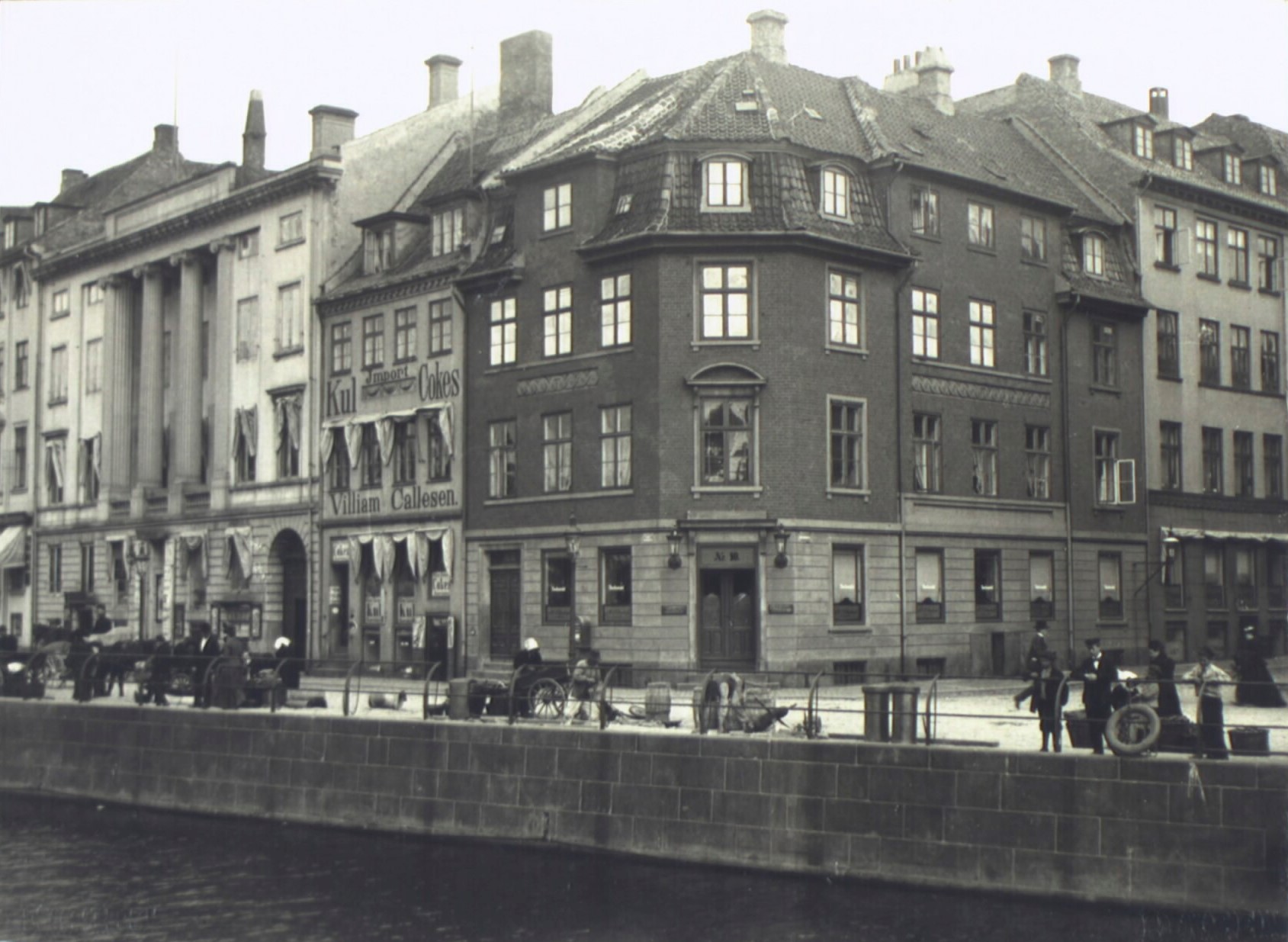
Ved Stranden 12 seen in a photograph by Fritz Theodor Benzen

Alfred Howitz & Co., a stockbroking firm, was for decades based in the building. The firm was founded on 12 February 1904 by Alfred Howitz. His son by the same name joined the company as a partner in 1948. The company was in 1950 still based in the building.

The building contains a single, 283 square metre apartment. It was put up for sale for DKK 45 mio. in 2016 but later taken off the market.

== Architecture ==
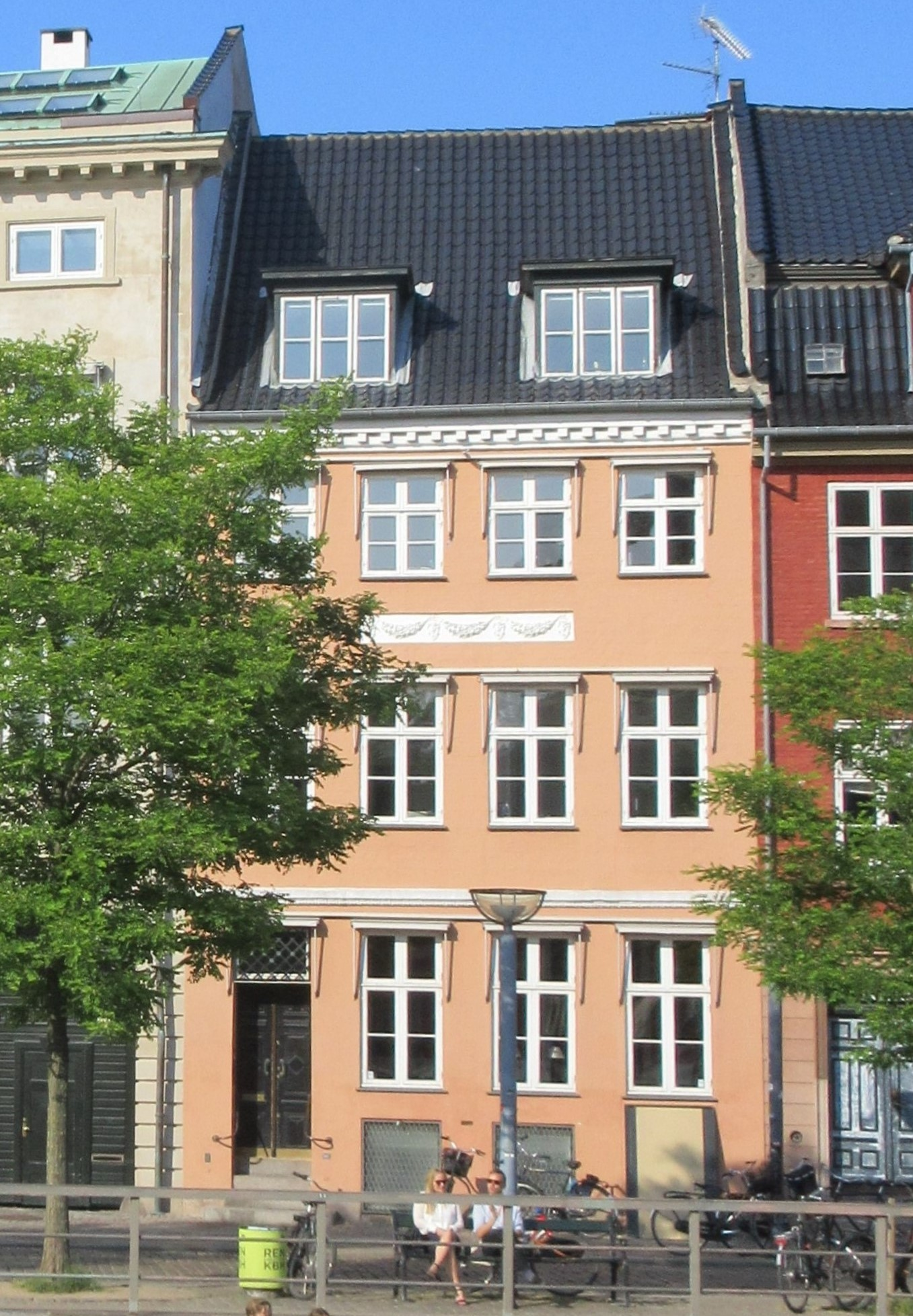
Ved Stranden 12

The building consists of three storeys over a high cellar and is four bays wide. The facade is rendered in a pale orange colour with white painted windows and decorative details. A cornice supported by corbels lines the top of the building and a second cornice is located between the ground floor and first floor. A central, slightly recessed frieze with three festoons is located between the first and second floor. The green painted entrance door is located on the left-hand side of the building while an inclined hatch farthest to the right affords access to the basement. A two-bay side wing projects from the rear side of the building. The roof is clad with black tiles towards the street and red tiles towards the small courtyard.
