= Ny Vestergade 11 =

Building in Copenhagen, Denmark

Nt Vestergade 11
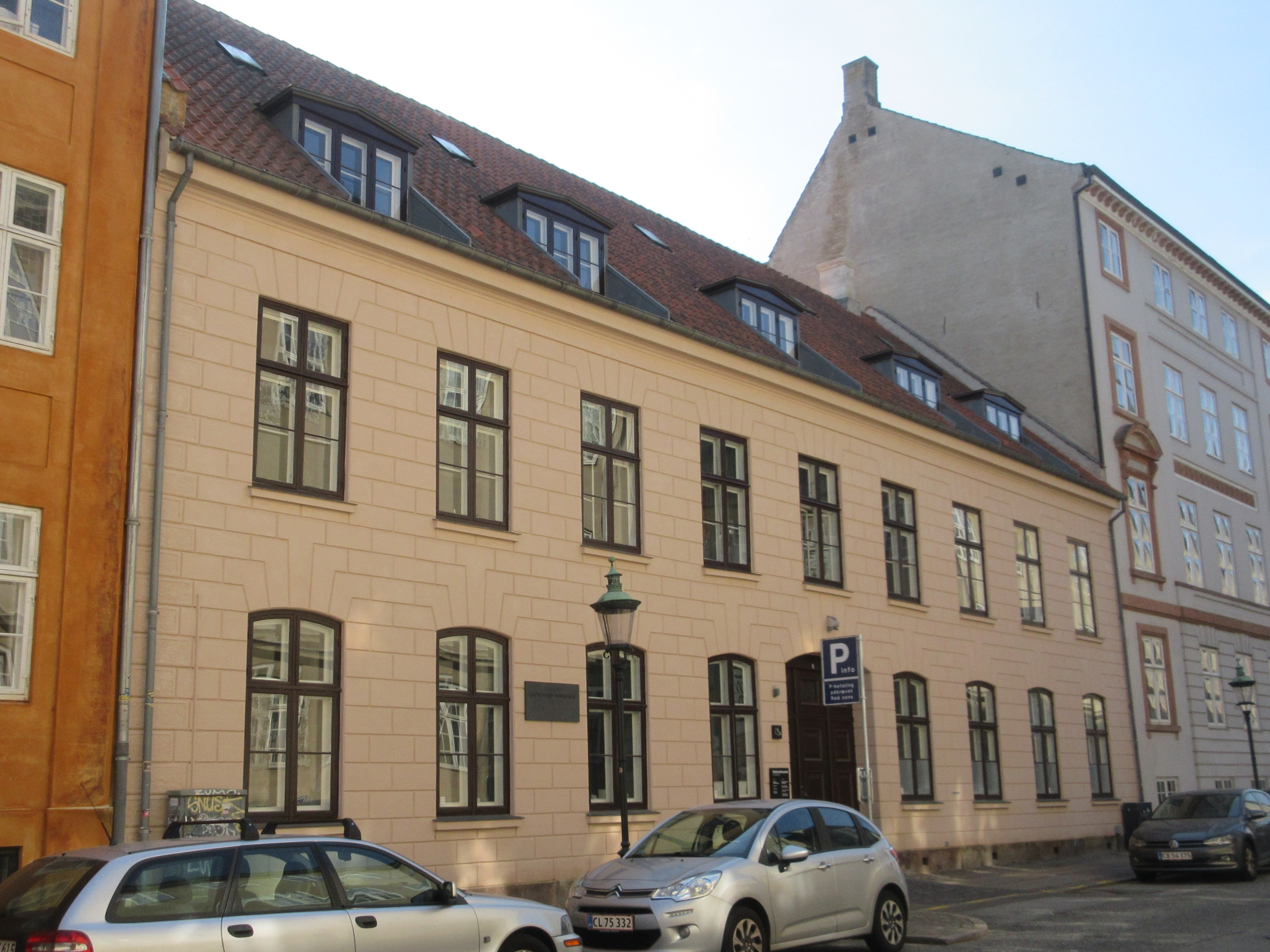
- Interactive map of the Nt Vestergade 11 area

General information
- Architectural style: Neoclassical
- Location: Copenhagen, Denmark
- Coordinates: 55°40′25.14″N 12°34′34.72″E
- Completed: 1821
- Renovated: 1858

Design and construction
- Architect: Johan Henrik Nebelong

Ny Vestergade 11 is an 18th-century building located across the street from the main entrance to the National Museum in central Copenhagen, Denmark. The University of Copenhagen bought the building in 1857 and it was subsequently adapted for use as a new chemical laboratory. It was later home to August Krogh's laboratory of animal physiology between 1910 and 1928. He and his wife, Marie Krogh, who was also a member of his staff, had an apartment in the building. A plaque on the facade commemorates that August Krogh lived in the building when he was awarded the Nobel Prize in 1920. The building was listed in the Danish Registry of Protected Buildings and Places in 1932.

== History ==
=== 18th century ===
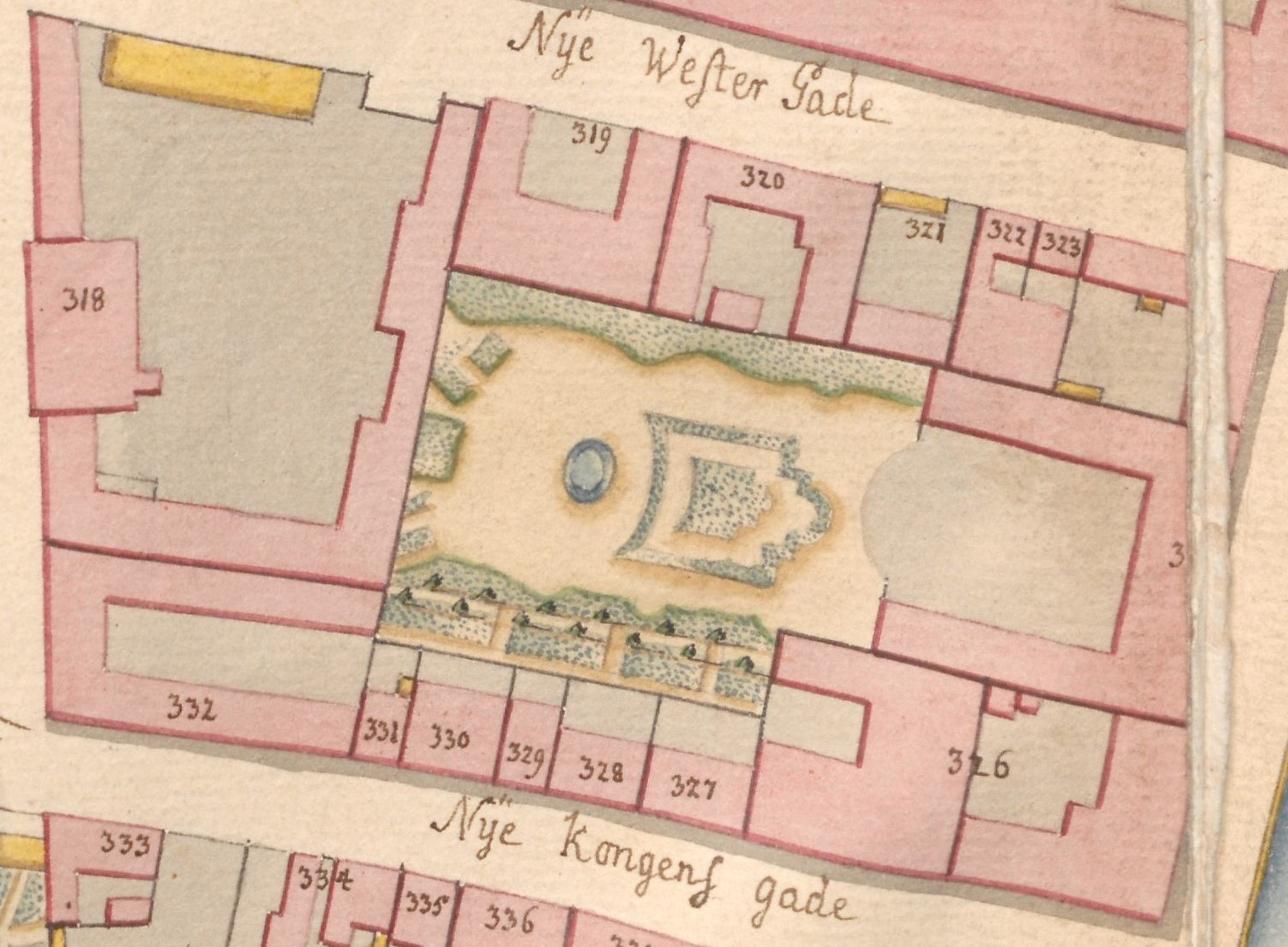
No. 319 seen in a detail from Christian Gedde's map of Copenhagen's West Quarter, 1757

The site was formerly made up of two smaller properties, listed in Copenhagen's first cadastre of 1689 as No. 281 and No. 282 in the city's West Quarter, both owned by Thomas Oxe at that time. They were later merged into a single property, owned by geheimeråd Ludvig von Plessen. His property was listed in the new cadastre of 1756 as No. 319 in the West Quarter.

=== 19th century ===
The property was listed in the new cadastre of 1806 as No. 216 in the West Quarter. It served as a rear wing of Vygel's property on the other side of the block at that time.

The building was constructed as a combined storage house and stables for grocer I. Lund in 1821.

The University of Copenhagen acquired the building in 1857 and commissioned Johan Henrik Nebelong to adapt it for its new use as a chemical laboratory.

Professor Hans Peter Jørgen Julius Thomsen resided in the first-floor apartment at the time of the 1880 census. He lived there with his wife Elmine Thomsen, their four daughters (aged 13 to 20) and two maids. Ole Hansen, another professor, resided on the ground floor with his wife Camilla Augusta Marie Hansen and their four children (aged six to 16).

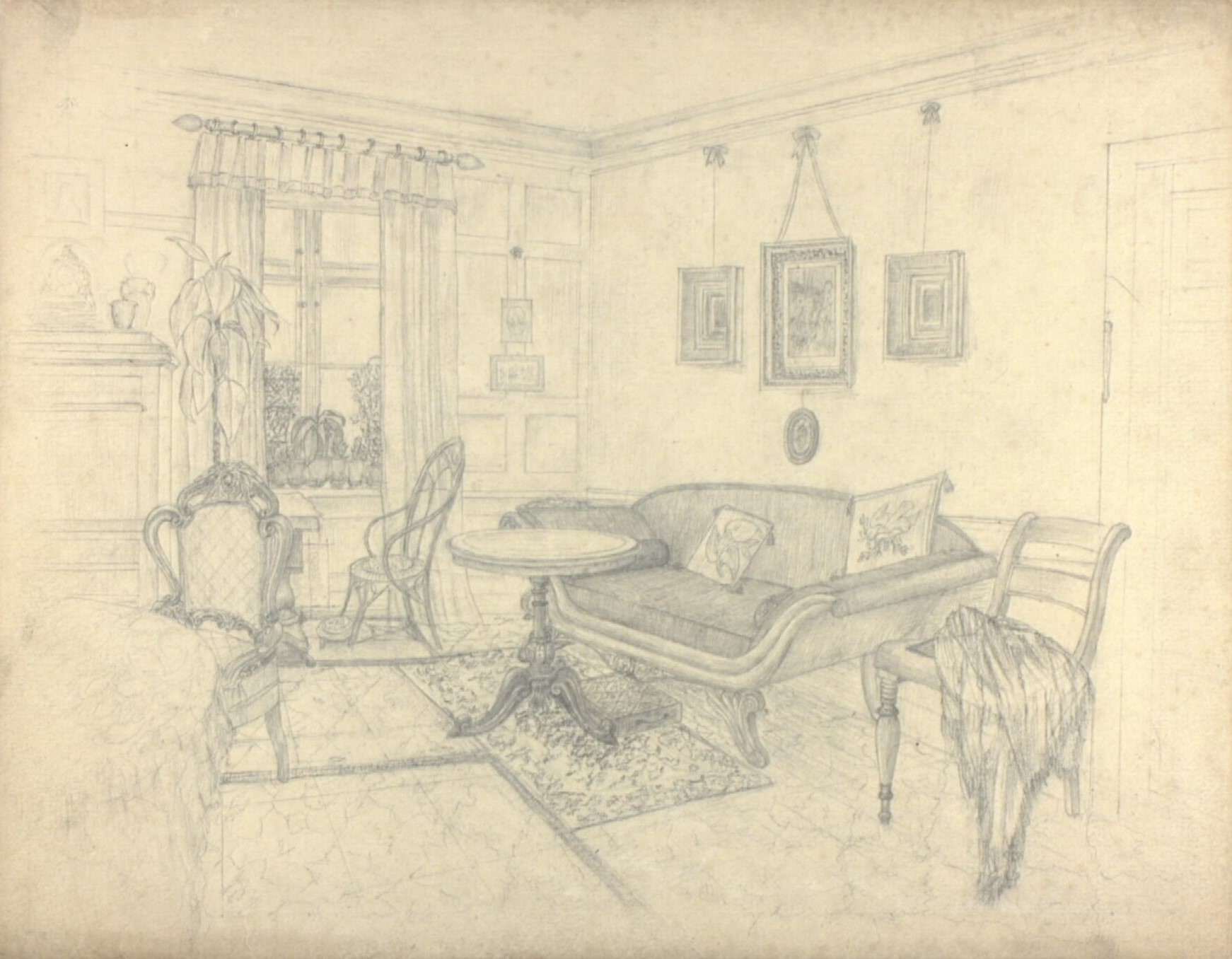
The interior of the professor's residence seen in a drawing by Marie Boje, 1974

The new chemical laboratory was inaugurated in a new side wing in 1859. A residence for professpr Julius Thomsen was also located in the complex. The laboratory remained at the site until 1892.

The building was in 1910 used by the university for a new laboratory of animal physiology created specially for August Krogh. His wife, Marie Krogh, was also a member of his staff. They also took over the residence. The premises were also used for sports physiological research carried out in collaboration with Johannes Lindhard. A delegation from the Rockefeller Foundation visited Krogh's laboratory in 1924 and ended up making a US§ 300,000 donation for a new building for Krogh and four other laboratories at the university. The Carlsberg Foundation donated an addition DKK for the project. Krogh's laboratory left Ny Vestergade 11 when the Rockefeller Complex was inaugurated in 1928.

== Architecture ==
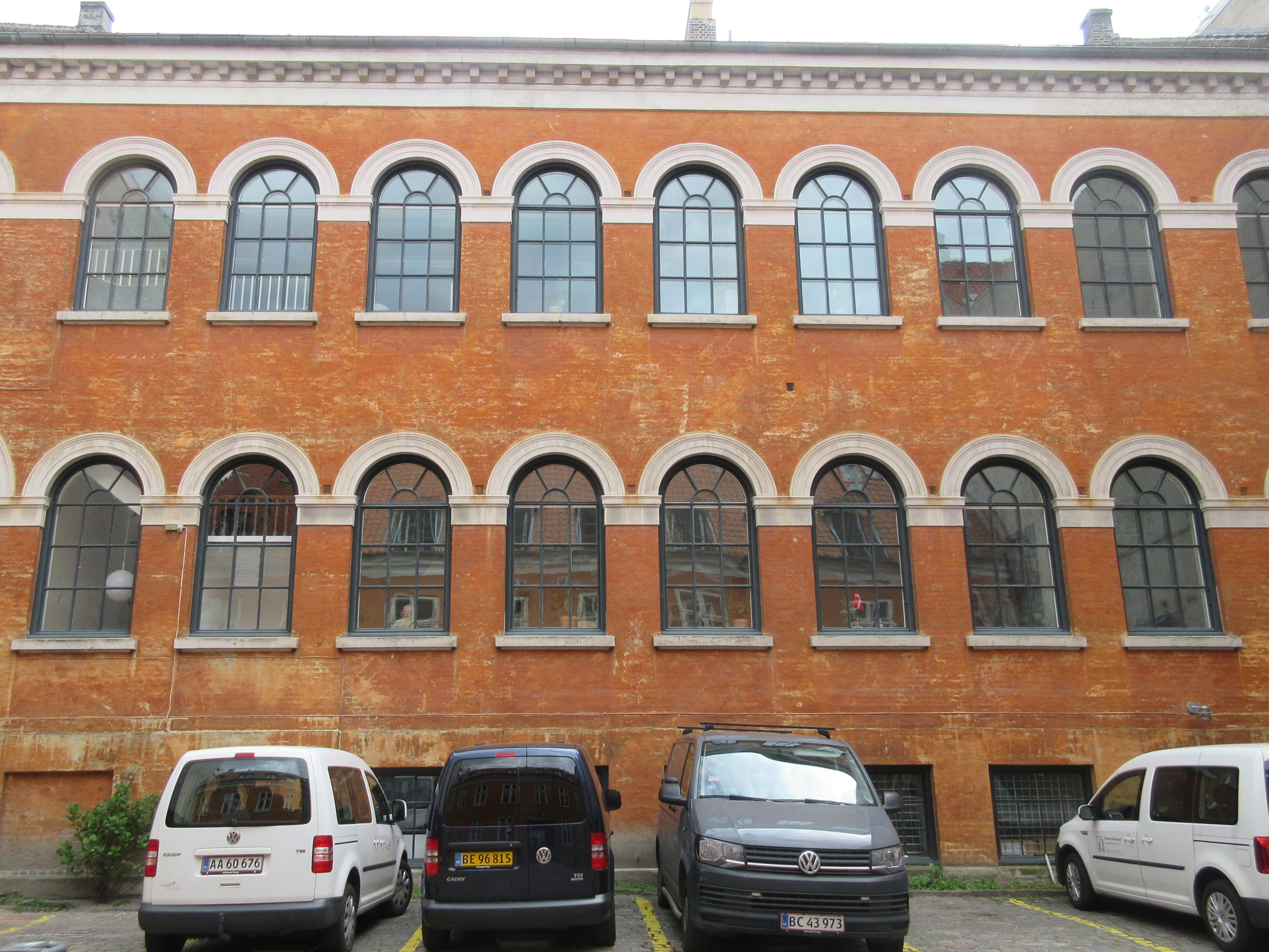
The rear wing from 1859

The building consists of two storeys and is nine bays long. A memorial plaque commemorates that August Krogh lived and worked in the building from 1910 until 1927.

== Today ==
The building is now used by the National Museum.
