= Sundorph House =

Building in Copenhagen, Denmark

- Sundorphs Gård
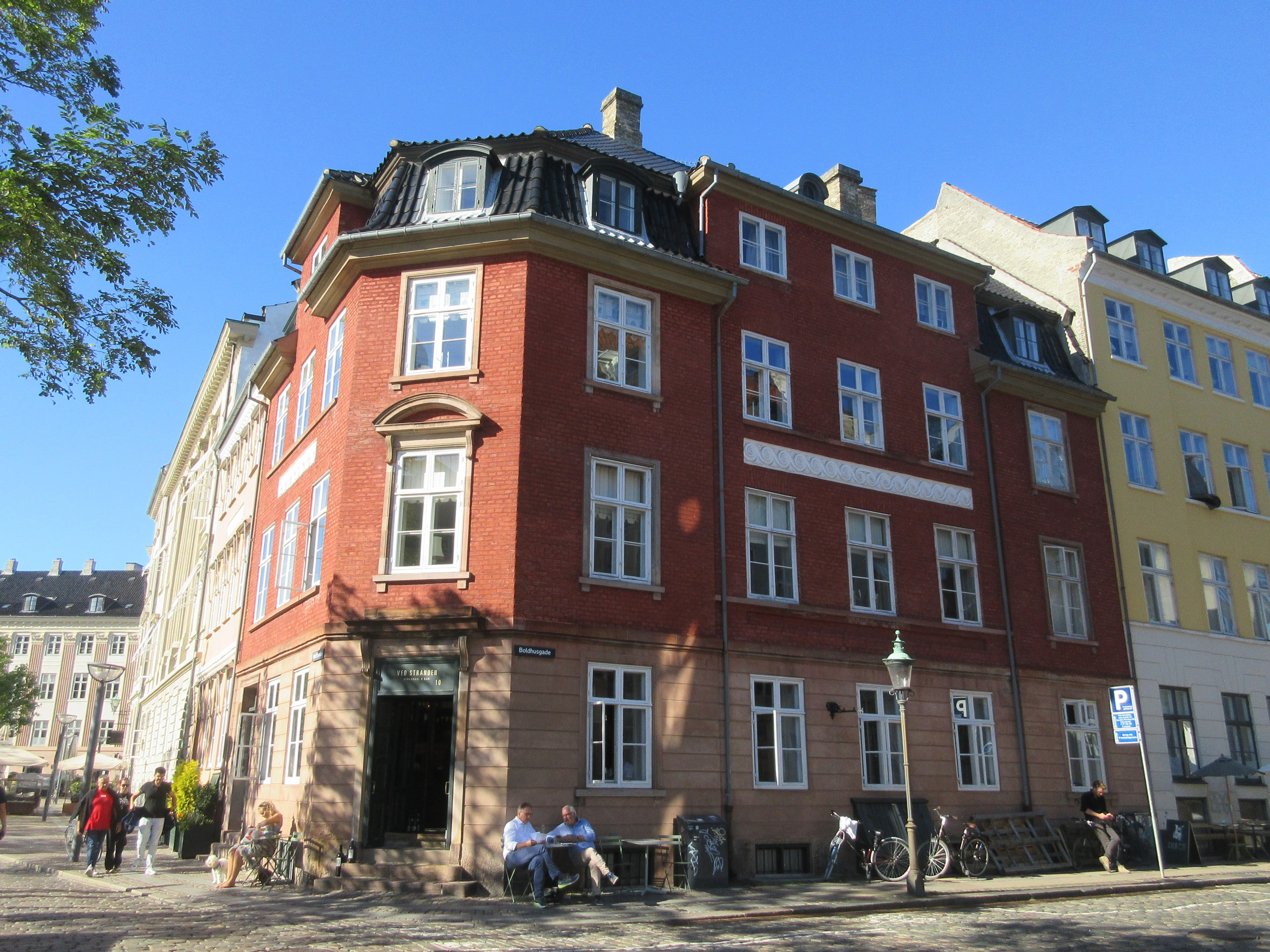
- The building seen from Boldhusgade
- Interactive map of the Sundorph House area

General information
- Architectural style: Neoclassical
- Location: Copenhagen, Denmark
- Coordinates: 55°40′38.37″N 12°34′53.63″E
- Construction started: 1796
- Completed: 1797

The Sundorph House is a Neoclassical property at Ved Stranden 10 in the Old Town of Copenhagen, Denmark. The property has since the late 17th century been owned by members of the Sundorph family. The current building was constructed for tea merchant Mette Christine Sundorph after the previous building at the site was destroyed in the Copenhagen Fire of 1795. It was listed in the Danish registry of protected buildings and places in 1918.

== History ==
=== 17th century ===
Back in the 17th century, Ved Stranden 10 (Sundorph House) and Ved Stranden 12 were part of the same property. There were already two separate buildings on the site back then The corner building was for a while operated as a guesthouse under the name "Den Sorte Ørn" ("The Black Eagle"). The adjacent building ontoowards the canal (now Ved Stranden 12) was known as Malm'es Herberg.

On 11 November 1678, it was acquired by Reinholt Hansen Horn. It is not clear weather he continued the guesthouse, operated a grocery business (urtelræmmer) on the site or combined the two occupations. He was married to Giertrud Hansdatter, daughter of the naval captain Hans Lauritzen (died 1683). She kept the property after her husband's death. She was later married to grocer r Thomas Thorsmeden but he died after a few years. Her property was listed in Copenhagen's first cadastre of 1689 as No. 211 in Eastern Quarter (Øster Kvarter). On 22 February 1710, Giertrud Hansdatter and her son Thomas »Thorskmede were granted a royal license to establish a production of French wine vinegar in the building. The facilities were located in the basement of the rar wing. On 10 April 1714, Malm'es Herberg (as No. 211 B) was sold to skipper Niels Pedersen Toft.

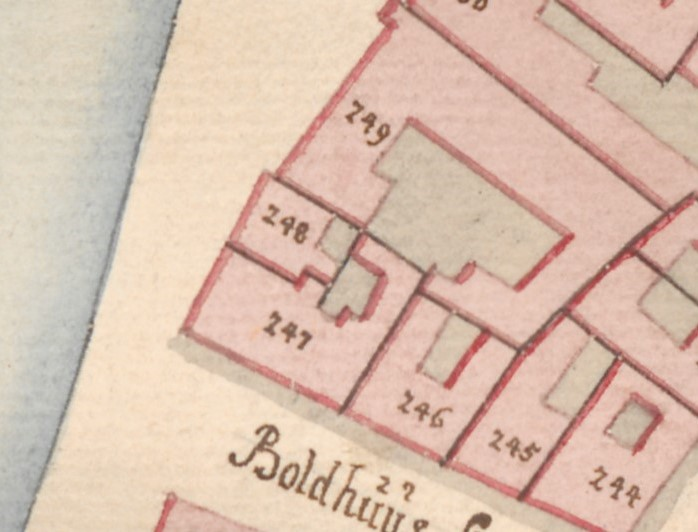
No. 247 seen in a detail from Christian Gedde's map of the East Quarter, 1757

Thomas Thorsmeden Jr. married on 29 July 1710 to Susanna Christina Winecke. He died just two and a half years later, leaving a wife and two daughters. His funeral took place on 24 January 1713. On 22 May 1713, Giertrud Hansdatter ceded the property to her widowed daughter-in-law. Susanna was later married to the customs official Jacob Olsen, He was later promoted to toldskricer (customs scribe) and awarded the title of kommerceråd. He died in 1736. Susanna Olsen continued the production of French wine vinegar. Her property was listed in the new cadastre of 1756 as No. 247 in Eastern Quarter.

Susanna Olsen endowed the property to organist at Trinitatis Church Johan Foltmar, who was married to her sister's granddaughter.

=== Hans and Mette Christiane Pay ===
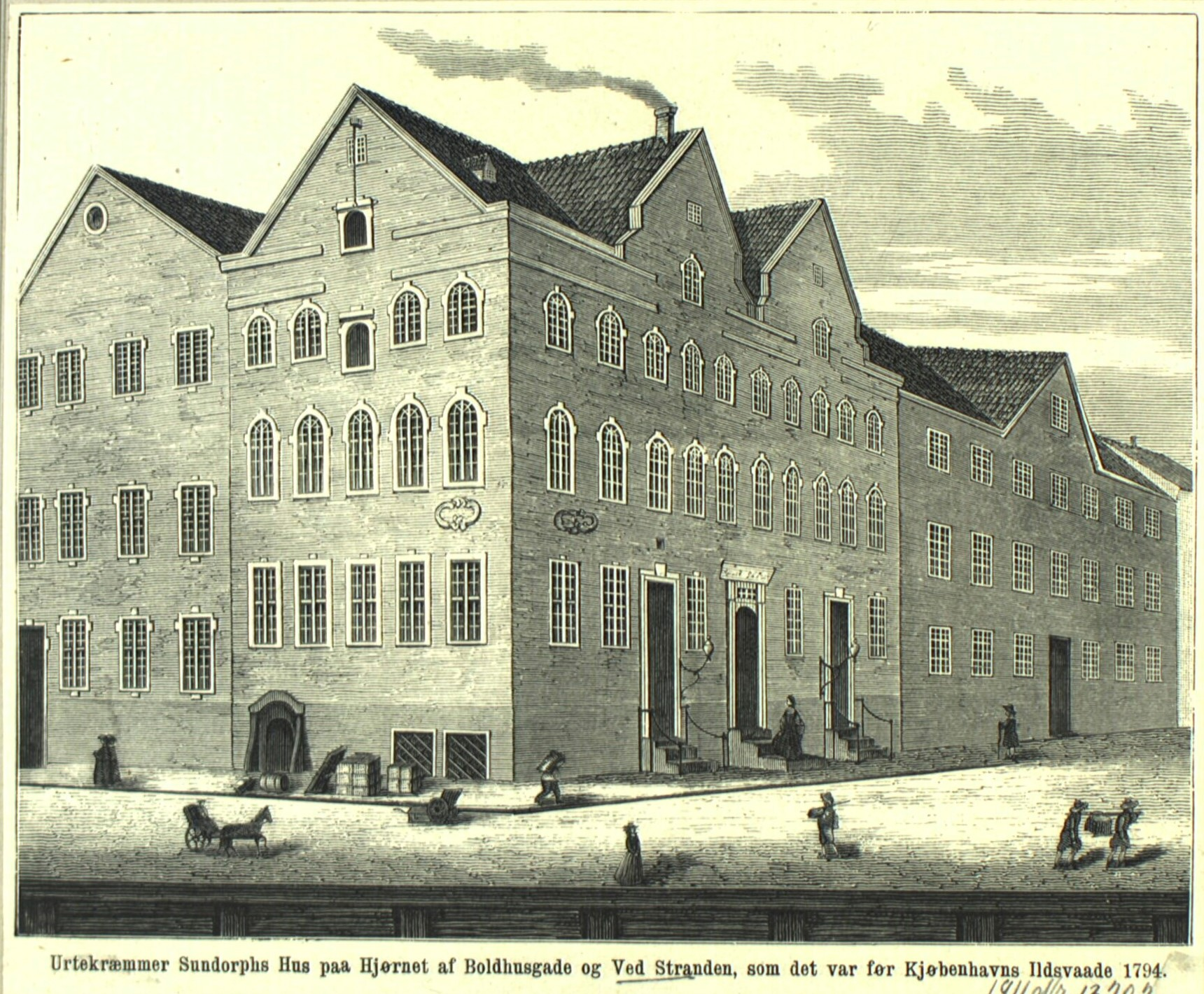
Sundorph's House as it appeared before the Great Fire of 1795

In 1772, Foltmar sold the property for 7.000 rigsdaler to Hans Pay. Pay was born in Drammen in 1738. He had later worked as bookkeeper for John & David Brown in Copenhagen before establishing his own business in 1768. On 24 June 1776, he was admitted to the Grocer's Guild (Urtekræmmerlauget). He married on 20 August 1773 to a Mette Christine Lauesdatter Collstrip. She was the sister of Andreas Collstrp. who had taken over the Gustmeyer timber business a few houses away.

Hans Pay died pm 30 December 1777. Mette Christine Pay (née Collstrup, 1752–1834) continued the firm after her husband's death.

=== Sundorph family ===
Mette Christiane Pay (née Collstrop) married on 21 December 1778 to Søren Sundorph (1743–1794). His birth name was Søren Christensen but he had assumed the name Sundorph after his home town Nørre Sundby in the north of Jutland. He had initially worked for grocer Peder Møller in nearby Fortunstræde. In 1773, he had partnered with tea and porcelain merchant Nicolai Nicolai Hendrich Wismer. Wismer. The latter was the owner of Boldhusgade No. 245, just two houses from Pay's property. In 1789, Sundorph was elected as one of Copenhagen's 32 Men.

Søren Christian and Mette Christine Sundorph resided in the building with their six children (aged one to 12), grocer (employee) Henrich Bohr, two apprentices and two maids at the time of the 1787 census.

On Sundorph's death in 1794, Mette Christine Sundorph once again took over the operations of the company whose name was changed to Mette Christine sal. Sundorphs Enke & Co. ('Metta Christine late Sundorph's Widow & Co.').

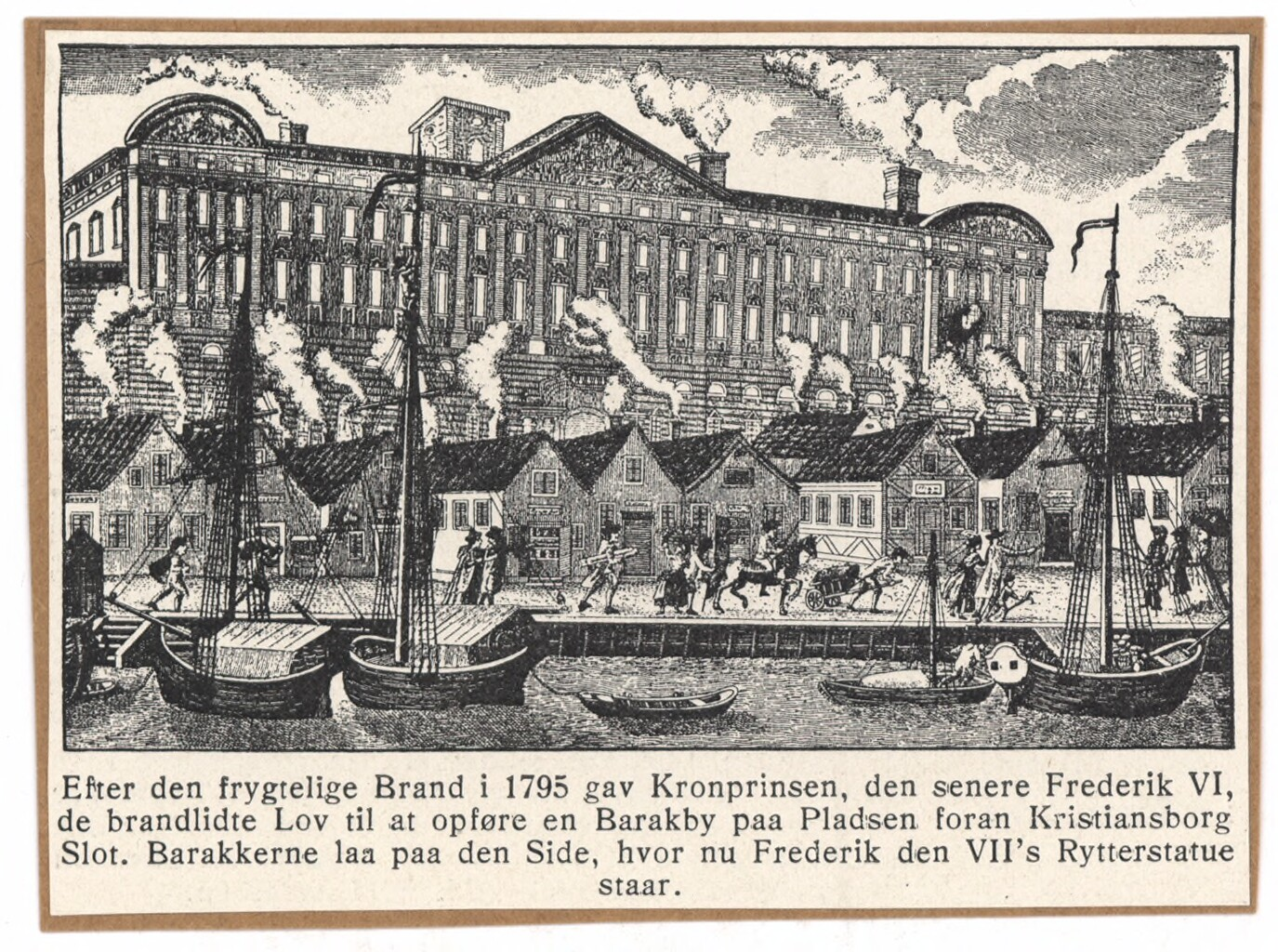
The wooden sheds in front of the destroyed Christiansborg Palace

The Sundorph House, together with most of the other buildings in the area, was destroyed in the Copenhagen Fire of 1795. The company was then run from a wooden shed on Slotsholmen until the house at Ved Stranden was rebuilt to a new design in 1797.

The name of the company was changed to Sundorphs Enke & søn ('Sundorph's Widown & Son') when the elder of her two sons, Christian Severin Sundorph (1780–1826), joined it in 1812. The younger son, Hans Pay Sundorph (1790–1860), joined the company in 1816 and became its sole owner upon his brother's death in 1826. The company then took the name H. P. Sundorph. It was later passed on to his son, Georg Christian Sundorph (1826—1875), who joined it in 1856. His widow, Anna Margrethe Sundorph (née v. Stöcken), ran it after his death. Her son, Hans Pay Sundorph, became a partner in the company in 1884 and its sole owner in 1894. It had by then become a tea wholesaler.

=== 19th century ===
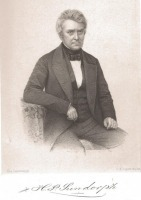
Hans Pay Sundorph

The property was home to a total of 18 residents in two households at the 1801 census. Sundorph lived in the house with her six children, the associate Peder Jensen and seven more employees. Maria Sophie Fenger, a 28-year-old widow, resided in the building with her three-year-old daughter and one maid. The property was in the new cadastre of 1806 listed as No. 156.

M. C. Sundorph's property was listed in the new cadastre of 1806 as No. 156 in Eastern Quarter.

At the time of the 1745 census, the property was home to a total of 16 people. Hans Pay Sundorph and his wife Else Christine Marie Klinting resided with their two sons, two employees and three servants on the two lower floors. Ferdin. Cons. Schumacher resided with his wife, three children and two maids on the second floor.

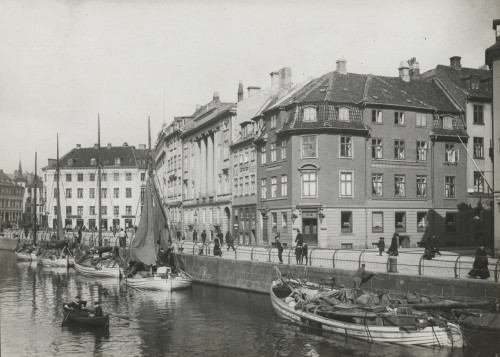
The house in the 1900s

The Danish Chamber of Commerce (Grosserer-Societetet) was based in the building prior to their acquisition of the Exchange Building (Børsen) on the other side of the canal in 1857. The building was listed in 1918.

== Architecture ==
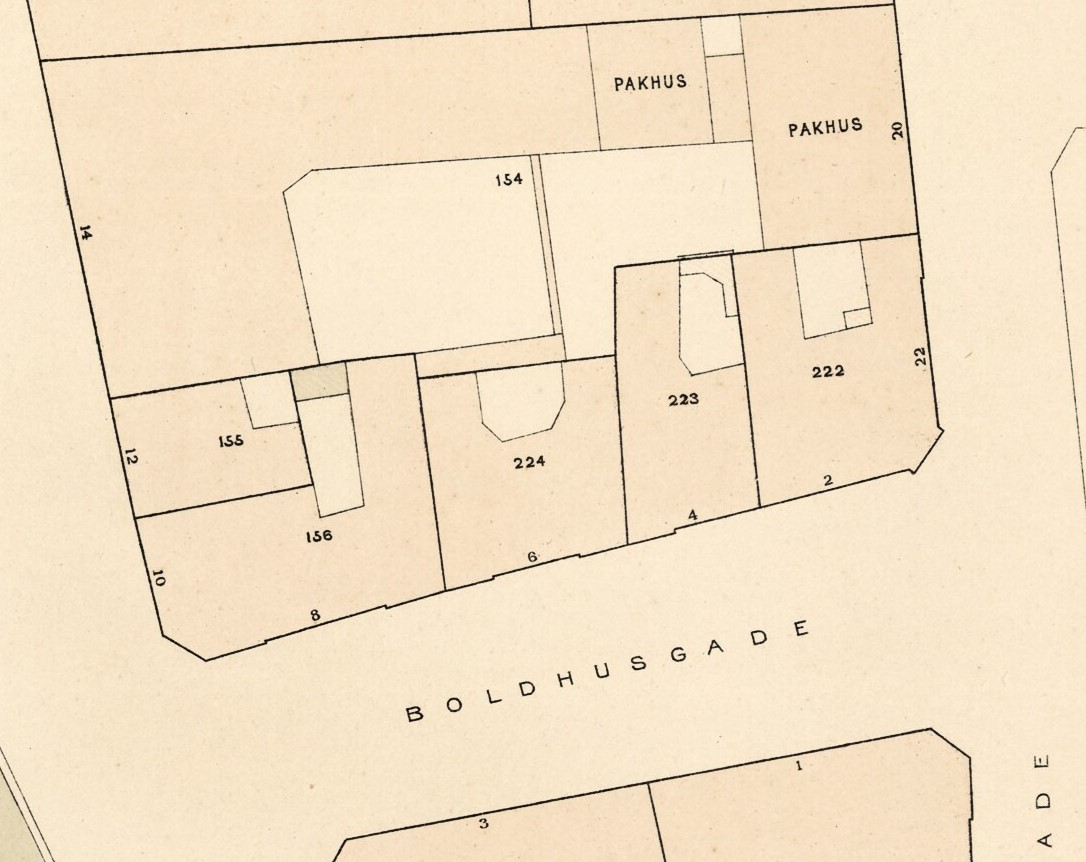
The property (left) seen in a detail from one of Berggreen's block plans of East Quarter, 1886-88

The house is built in the Baroque style and consists of three floors, mansard roof and a cellar. The facade on Boldhusgade is nine bays long while the facade fronting the canal is just three bays long. The roof is clad with black-glazed tiles. A three-bay wall dormer faces Boldhusgade and a single-bay wall dormer faces Ved Stranden. The four-storey side wing is five bays long.

== Gallery ==
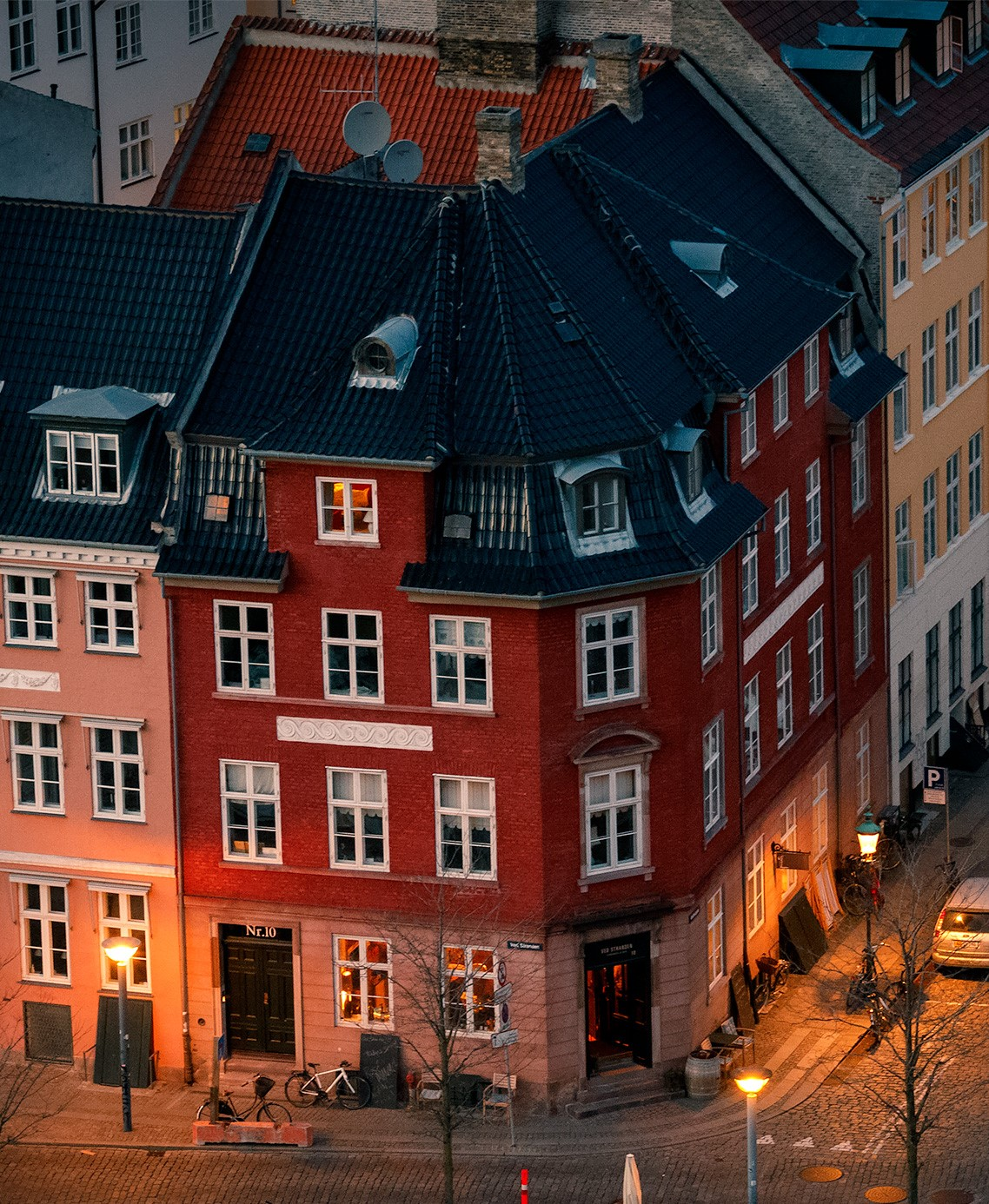

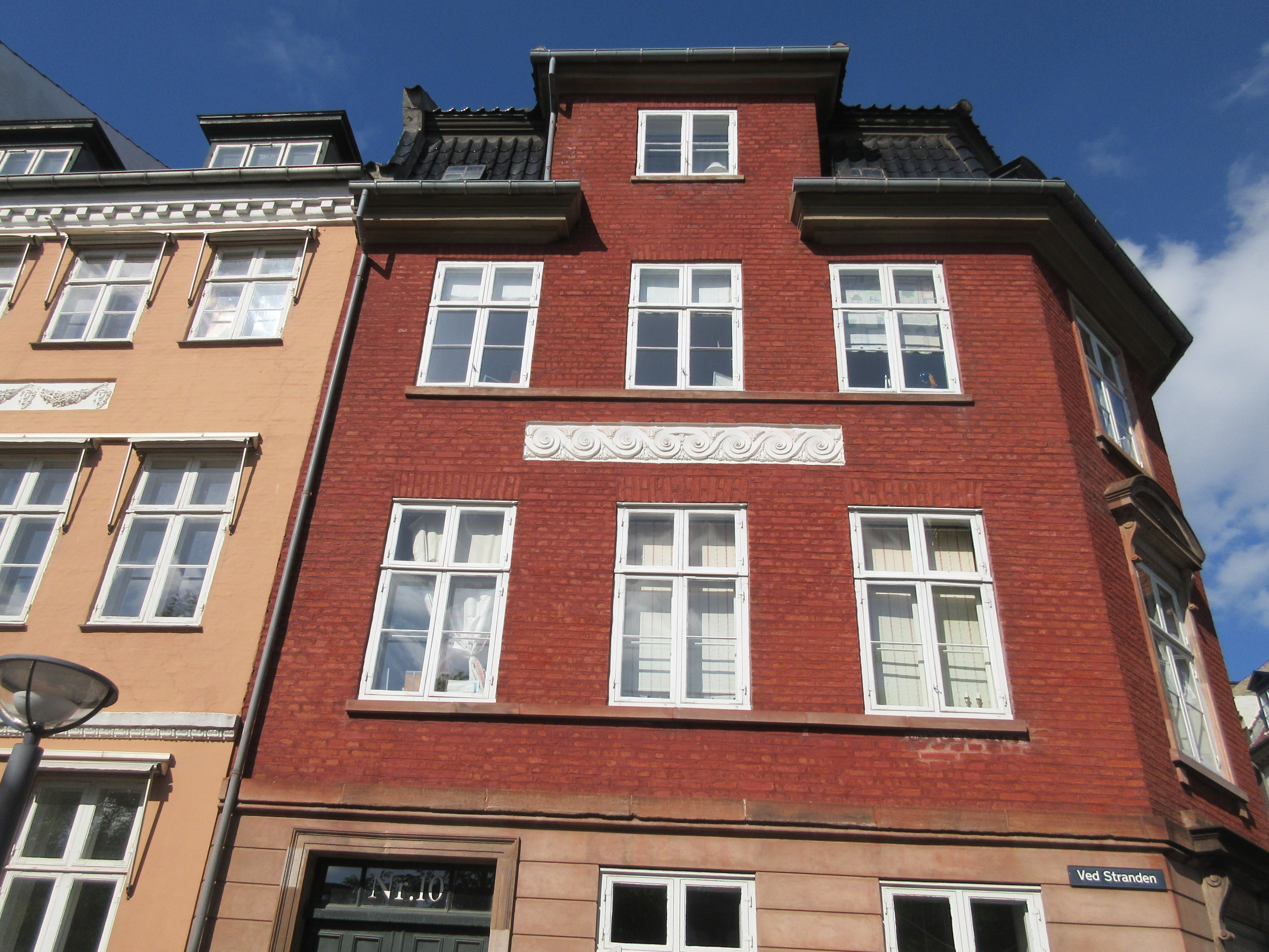

== Today ==
The building is now owned by Caroline Sundorph Pontoppidan. The ground floor is home to a combined wine shop, wine bar and lunch restaurant in the ground floor.
