= Boldhusgade 4 =

Building in Copenhagen, Denmark

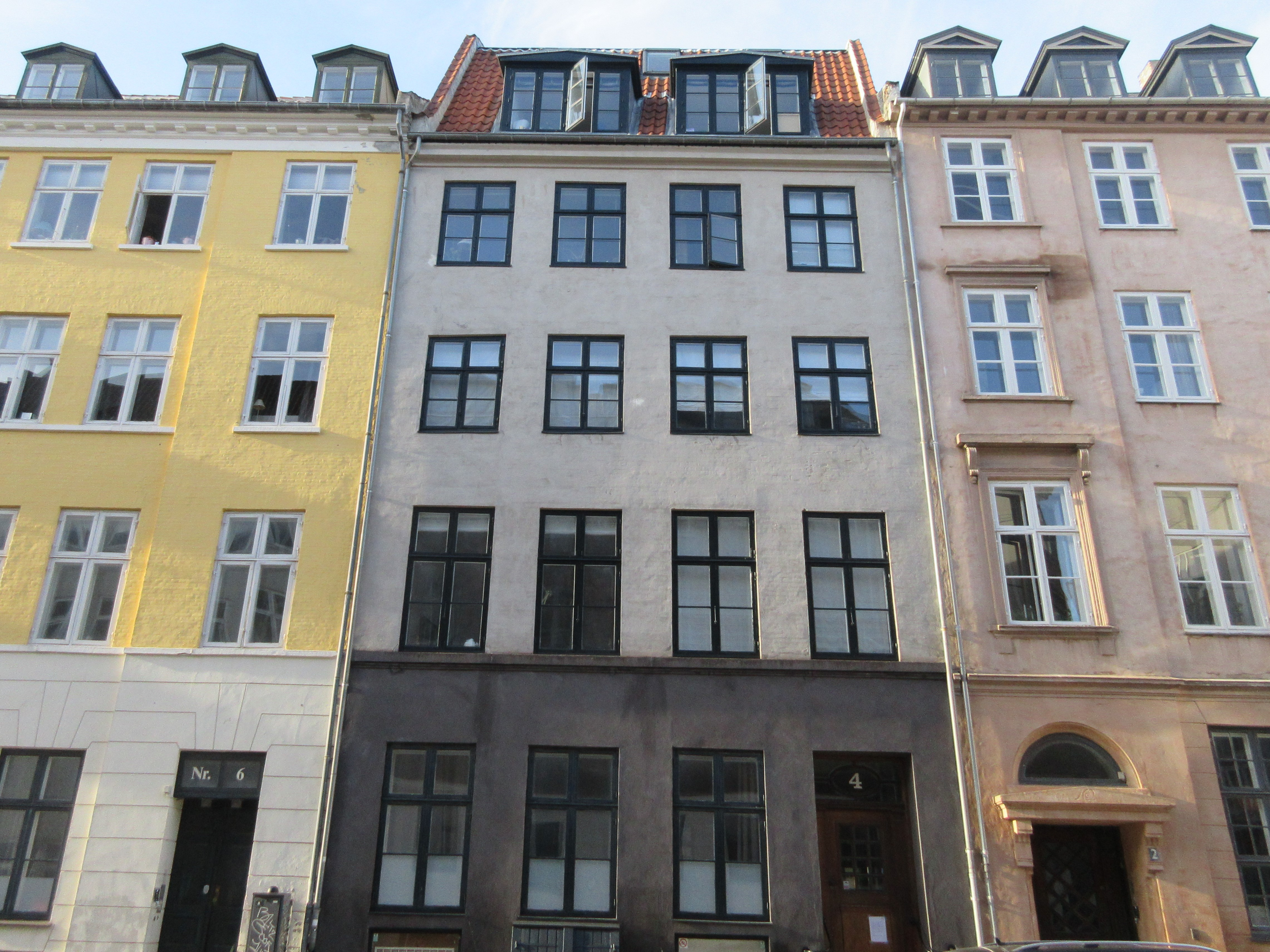
- Interactive map of the Boldhusgade 4 area

General information
- Architectural style: Neoclassical
- Location: Copenhagen, Denmark
- Coordinates: 55°40′38.96″N 12°34′55.06″E
- Construction started: 1796

Boldhusgade 4 is a Neoclassical property off the Ved Stranden canalfront in central Copenhagen, Denmark. The building was like most of the other buildings in the area constructed in the years after the Copenhagen Fire of 1795. It was listed in the Danish registry of protected buildings and places in 1959.

== History ==
=== Early history ===
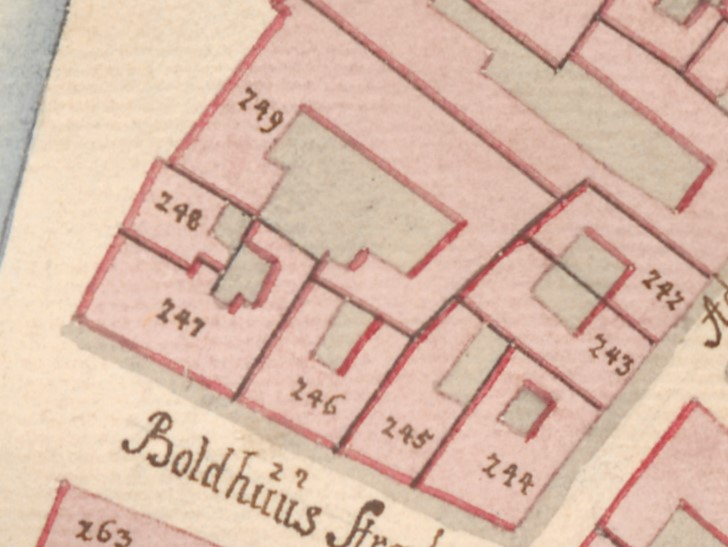
No. 245 seen on a detail from Christian Gedde's map of Eastern Quarter, 1757.

The property traces its history back to at least the 17th century. It was listed in Copenhagen's first cadastre of 1689 as No. 209 in Eastern Quarter, owned by one Lars Pedersen.

The property was listed in the new cadastre of 1756 as No. 245, owned by former director of Kvæsthuset Gregorius Nielsn'e widow Gertrud Catharina.

=== Wismer family ===
The property belonged to merchant Nicolai Hendrich Wismer at the time of the 1787 census. He lived there with his wife Anne Marie, their six children (aged one to 20), three maids and the lodgers Joachim Peigen (student) and Peter Molbek (supercargo).

The building was destroyed in the Copenhagen Fire of 1795. The current building was completed in 1796 for merchant Nikolaj H. Wismer.

Anne Maria Wismer keptthe property after her husband's death. She continued the family's tea and porcelain business., At the time of the 1801 census, she resided in the building with her three sons (aged 13 to 21), two female employees, two maids and a caretaker.

Anne Maria Wismer's property was listed in the new cadastre of 1806 as No. 223 in Eastern Quarter. She was registered as a tobacco merchant at that time

=== 1880 census ===
The building was at the time of the 1880 census home to a total of 20 people. Adolph Johannes Gjelstrup , a master tailor, resided with his wife, two children, a maid and a lodger on the two lower floors. Lauritz Peter Christian Hansen, a merchant, resided with his wife and a maid on the second floor. Hans Magnus Staal, ticket cashier at the Royal Danish Theatre, resided with his wife, son and a maid on the third floor. Henriette Augusta Westphalm a retailer and widow, resided with her two children (aged 22 and 23) in the basement. Juline Christine Falck, another widow, resided with her three children (aged 15 to 19) on the fourth floor.

== Architecture ==
Boldhusgade 4 is in four storeys over a raised cellar. The building is just four bays wide. The fourth storey was added in 1858. A flight of granite stairs lead up to the main entrance in the easternmost bay. The door is topped by a transom window.

A three-bay perpendicular side wing extends from the rear side of the building.

== Today ==
Boldhusgade 4 is today owned by Ejerlejfore Boldhusgade 4.
