= Louise Rasmussen =

Danish ballet dancer and actress, morganatic wife of King Frederick VII of Denmark

Louise Rasmussen Countess Danner
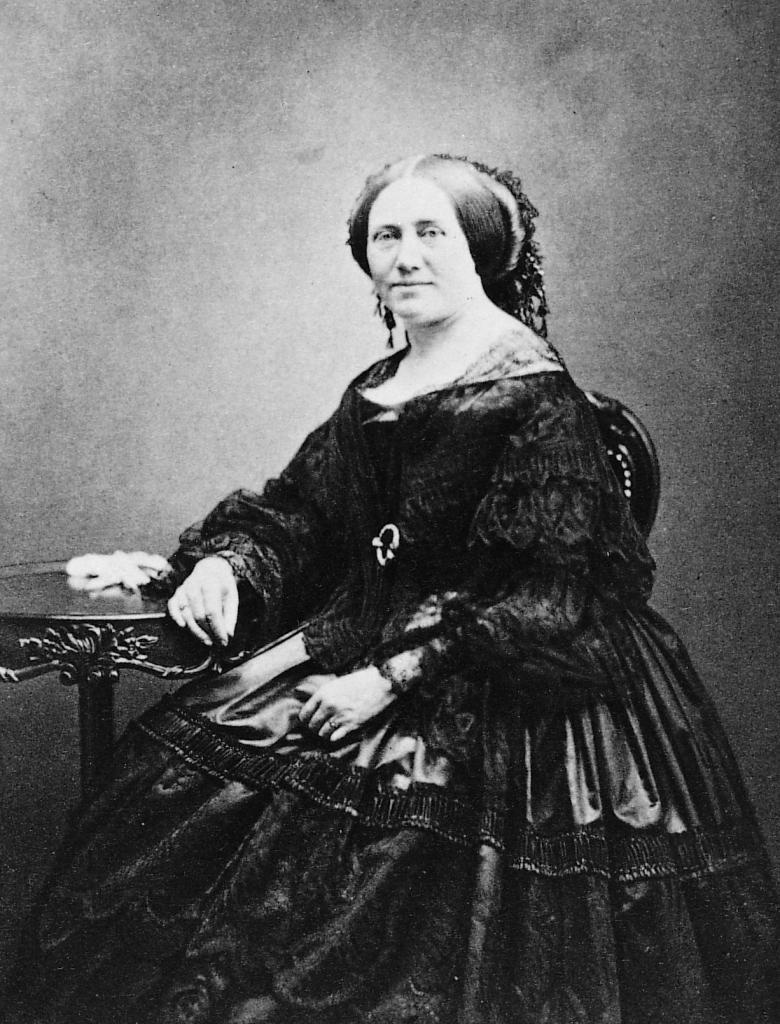
- Photograph of Louise Rasmussen, c. 1861
- Born: 21 April 1815; Copenhagen, Denmark
- Died: 6 March 1874 (aged 58); Genoa, Italy
- Title: Countess Danner
- Spouse: Frederick VII of Denmark (m. 1850; died 1863)
- Children: Carl Christian Berling
- Parent(s): Juliane Caroline Rasmussen; Gotthilf Ludevig Køppen

Louise Christine Rasmussen, also known as Countess Danner (21 April 1815 – 6 March 1874), was a Danish ballet dancer and stage actress. She was the mistress and later the morganatic wife of King Frederick VII of Denmark. She was not a queen consort, but officially styled Countess Danner.

== Biography ==
=== Early life ===
Louise Rasmussen was the daughter of the unmarried maid Juliane Caroline Rasmussen and the merchant Gotthilf Ludevig Køppen. She was a student of the ballet school of the Opera in Copenhagen in 1826, was contracted in 1830 and a figurante ballerina in 1835. In 1841, she had a child with the print maker Carl Berling, who was the heir of the paper Berlingske Tidende, one of the most important Danish newspapers. She retired from the ballet in 1842 and opened a fashion shop.

Louise Rasmussen's illegitimate son, Frederik Carl Christian Louis Berling, born in 1841, later known as Christian Charles Jacobsen, was a farmer and became landowner of Weybread Hall in Suffolk.

She got to know Crown Prince Frederick through Berling in the 1830s and had a relationship with him during the 1840s. Frederick became king in 1848. He wanted to marry Louise, but the government forbade it, as Frederick was childless and no children born from a marriage with Louise would have been entitled to the throne. The reformed law of 1849, however, made the king so popular that he was able to have his wish granted.

=== Marriage to Frederick VIII ===
On 8 August 1850, Louise Rasmussen was given the title "Countess of Danner" and was married to Frederick in Frederiksborg Slotskirke by Bishop J. P. Mynster. She was the morganatic spouse of King Frederick, and was thereby not queen, nor did any possible children from the union have any right to the throne. The marriage was met with great dislike and opposition, especially from the upper-class and the nobility, who considered it a misalliance. Louise was met with humiliation and disdain in social circles. On one occasion, for example, Frederick and Louise participated at a grand formal dinner with many members of the highest nobility; at the occasion in question, it was the custom of the nobility to propose a toast to the spouse of the monarch. This time, however, no one proposed a toast, even though Frederick and Louise waited for it to happen. Eventually, Frederick lost his patience, stood up and said openly: "As no one here will propose a toast to my wife, I will do so myself!", after which the nobility finally raised their glasses.

Louise was not regarded to be a member of high society nor to have any right to participate in it: she had never been a debutante or formally introduced at the royal court and high society in the way a noblewoman would normally be, and her presence was thereby basically considered to be incognito. Frederick did attempt to have Louise formally introduced to high society. He introduced her to his stepmother, queen dowager Caroline Amalie, by arranging a formal visit between them, and then demanded that the queen dowager's ladies-in-waiting return the visit to Louise, which was the normal process. However, Caroline Amalie stated that she had accepted to receive Louise exclusively to be kind to the king and with the understanding that the visit should be unofficial, and that Louise could thereby not be regarded as formally introduced to society and remained a private person which her ladies-in-waiting had no obligation to visit: she reminded him that no officials had been present at his wedding because he himself had wished it to be an unofficial wedding, and should her ladies visit Louise, the whole matter would become official. The letter from the queen dowager was seen as an insult and a rebuff to Louise and enraged Frederick, who refused to give a reply and let the matter drop.

In 1854, the couple bought the manor, Jægerspris Slot, as a place to spend their private life.

=== After Frederick VIII's death ===
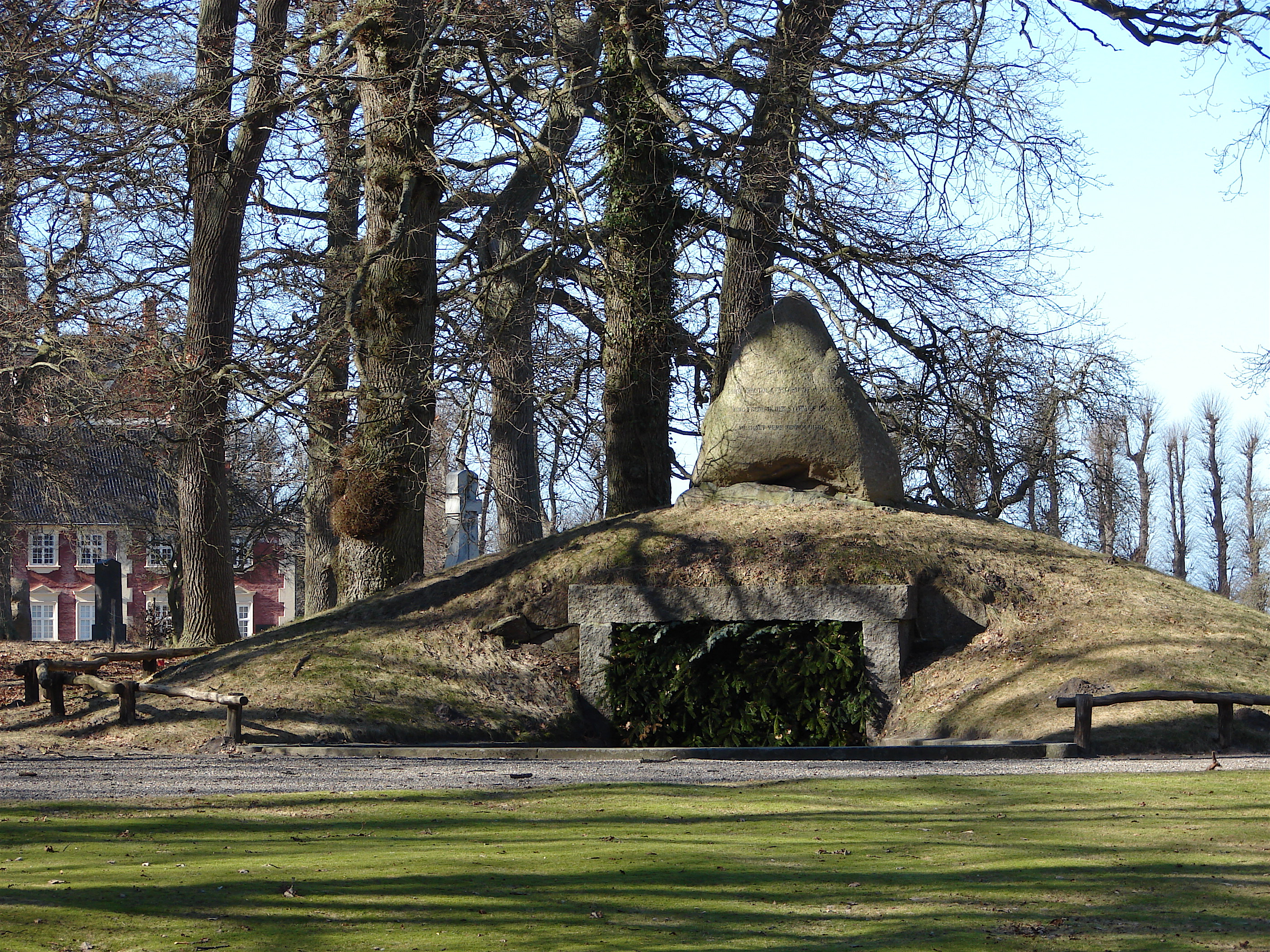
The tomb of Countess Danner at Jægerspris Castle

After Frederick's death in 1863, Louise lived a discreet life. In 1864, she bought the property Ny Vestergade 13 which served as her city home for the rest of her life. The rest of the year was spent either at Jægerspris Castle or Skodsborg. When she died, she left Jægerspris Slot "to the benefit of poor and destitute servant girls" in her last will and testament. Her tomb is at Jægerspris Castle.

In 1873, she founded "Frederick the VII's Foundation for Poor Women from the Working Class" in Copenhagen.

== Commemoration ==
"Frederick the VII's Foundation for Poor Women from the Working Class" (Nansensgade 1) was renamed the Danner House, in honour of Countess Danner. The organization is now known simply as "Danner".

A monument to Countess Danner designed by Kirsten Justesen was unveiled in Copenhagen in 2024. It stands at the corner of Vester Søgade and Gyldenløvesgade.

The public space Danners Plads in Hillerød is also named after Countess Danner.

The Museum of National Museum at Frederiksborg Castle hosted an exhibition about Countess Danner in 2025.

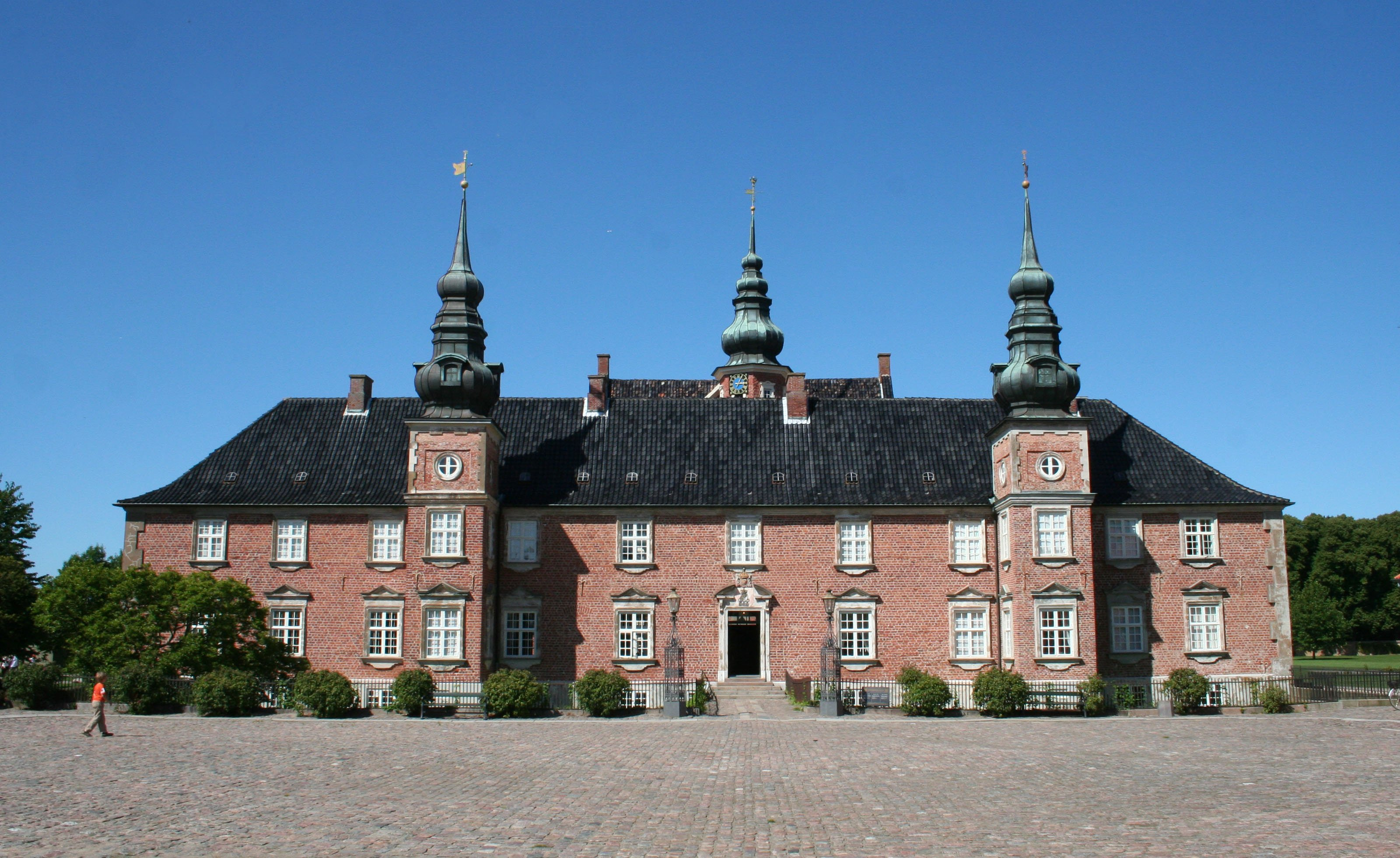
Jægerspris Castle

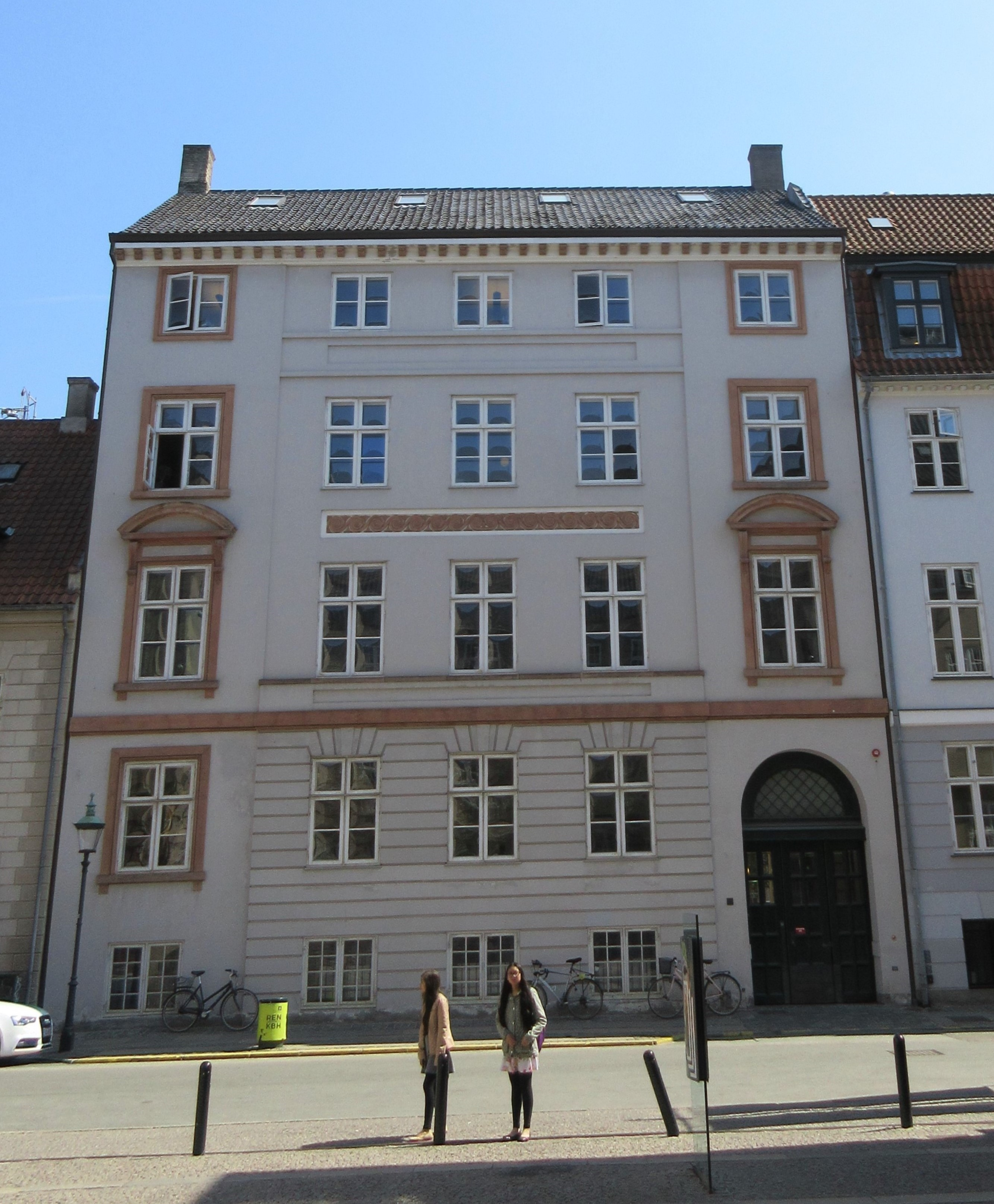
Ny Vestergade 13, Copenhagen

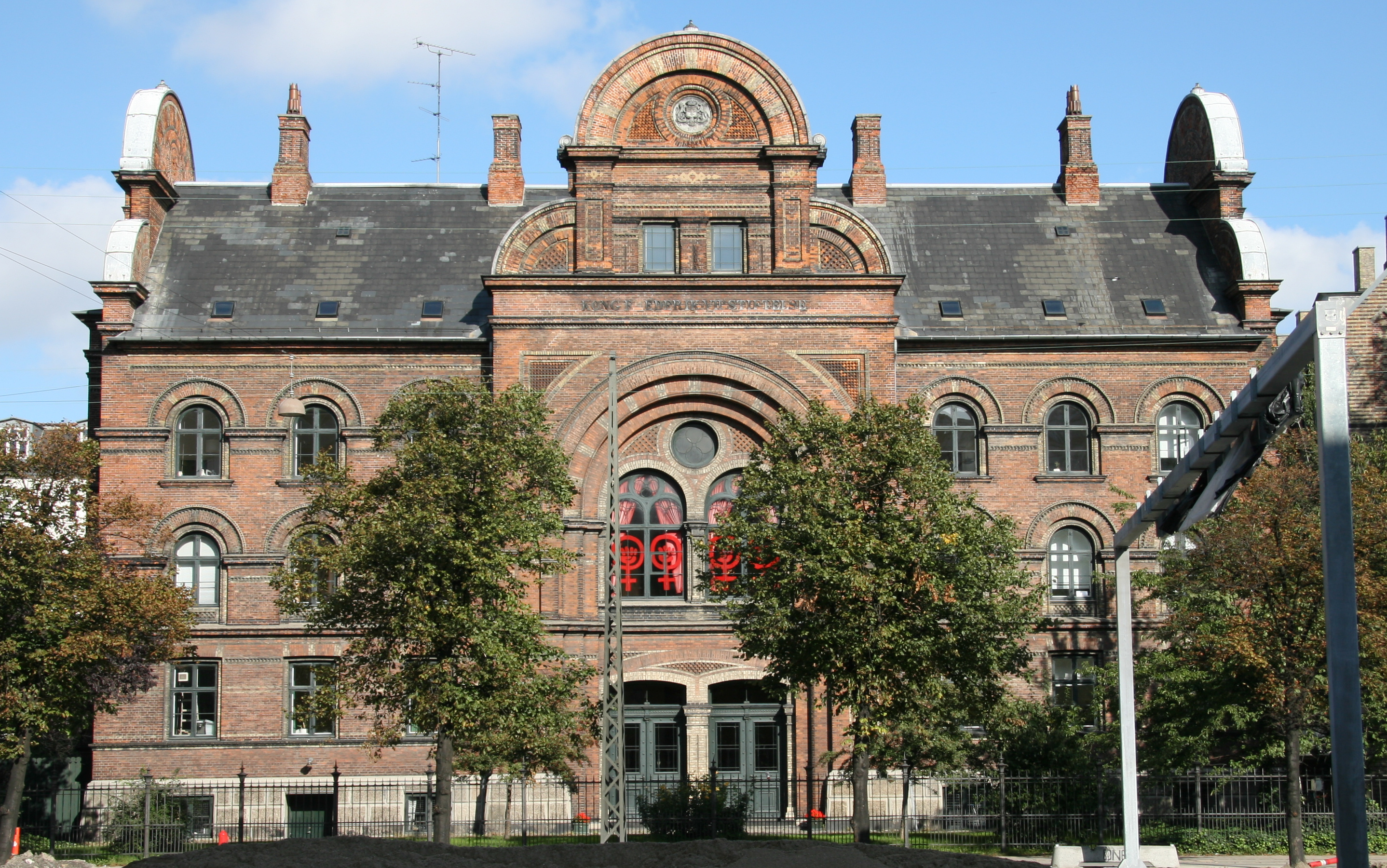
The Danner House, Copenhagen

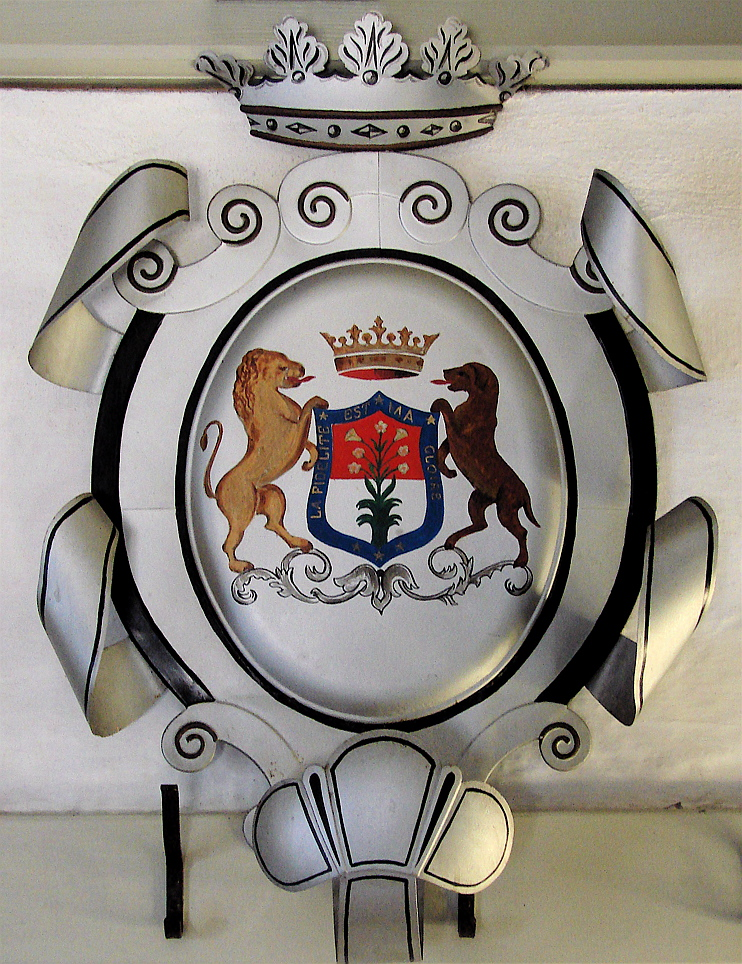
Countess Danner's coat of arms in Dråby Church

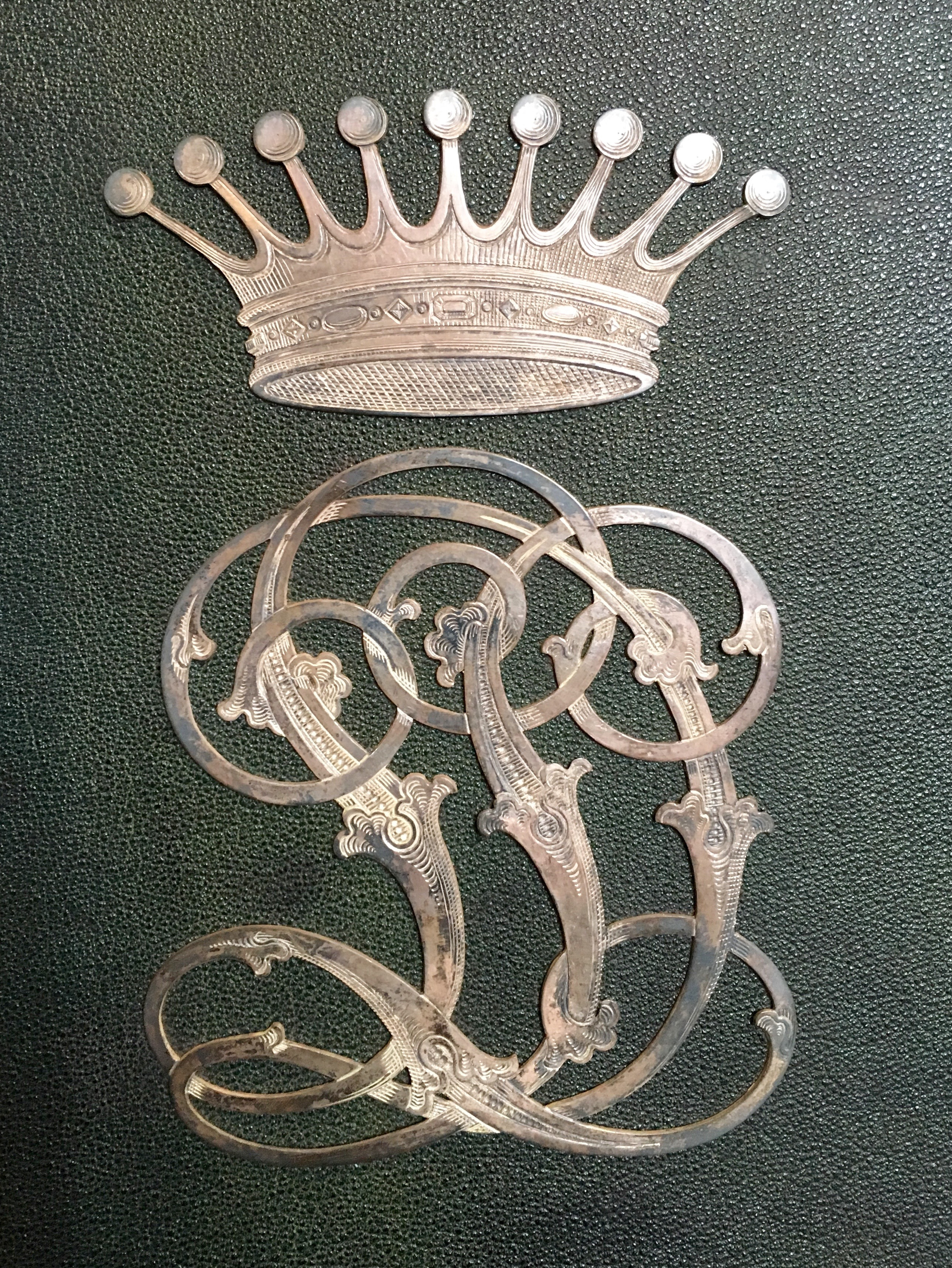
Countess Danner's crowned monogram on a letter book at Jægerspris Castle

== See also ==
- Kirsten Munk
