= Peschier =

Peschier is a surname. Notable people with the surname include:

- Benoît Peschier (born 1980), French-Greek slalom canoeist
- Claude Peschier (fl. 1967–1973), French slalom canoeist
- Nicolas Peschier (born 1984), French slalom canoeist
- N.L. Peschier (died after 1661), Dutch Golden Age painter
- Pierre Peschier (1739–1812), Danish merchant

== See also ==
- Peschier House, a listed property in Copenhagen
