= Heinrich Gustav Ferdinand Holm =

Danish artist and engraver

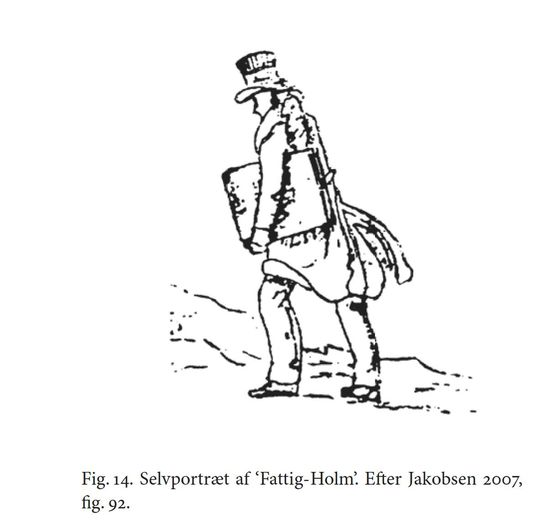
- Self-portrait
- Born: 23 April 1803; Berlin, Germany
- Died: 1 May 1861 (aged 58); Copenhagen, Denmark
- Known for: Painting

Heinrich Gustav Ferdinand Holm, often referred to as H.G.F. Holm (23 April 1803 – 1 May 1861), was a Danish artist and engraver who is remembered for his finely detailed topographical paintings and drawings of Copenhagen and surroundings.

== Biography ==
Holm was born on 23 April 1803 in Berlin, the son of copperplate engraver Jens Holm, (1776–1859) and Ane Louise Kohler (1780–1863). He initially followed in the footsteps of his father as an engraver and illustrator. He was most likely a pupil of C. J. Thomsen who insisted on accuracy and detail, qualities which are reflected in Holm's own work. As a result, Holm quickly became a master of his genre, not only as an illustrator but in the difficult technique of watercolour painting. He began to specialize in illustrating prospectuses, often sketching areas and buildings of interest before making multiple copies at home, often with minor variations. He sometimes produced skeleton drawings which he later coloured with watercolour. His subjects were taken mainly from the streets and squares of Copenhagen, comprising castles and churches, the stock exchange, the university, as well as views of the city from vantage points such as Rundetårn. In addition, he produced a series of works covering the surrounding countryside, for example the collection Sjællands yndigste Egne (1826–28). Many of his plates appeared in magazines such as Magazin for Ungdommen (1839–40), its successor Cosmorama (1840–43), and Nyt Magazin for Natur og Menneskekundskab (1848). He also illustrated prospectuses for the Royal Porcelain Factory, especially in regard to designs for tea and coffee cups.

On 23 July 1828 in Gentofte, he married Karen Marie Nielsen (c. 1801 – 1853). They had four children. Despite Holm's high rate of productivity, he constantly suffered from lack of money, which drove him to drink frequently. The resulting vicious cycle encouraged him to sell his works at low prices which explains how he was given the nickname: Fattigholm or "Poor Holm". More recent research indicate that he suffered from mental illness. He died at Almindeligt Hospital in Copenhagen.

== Works ==
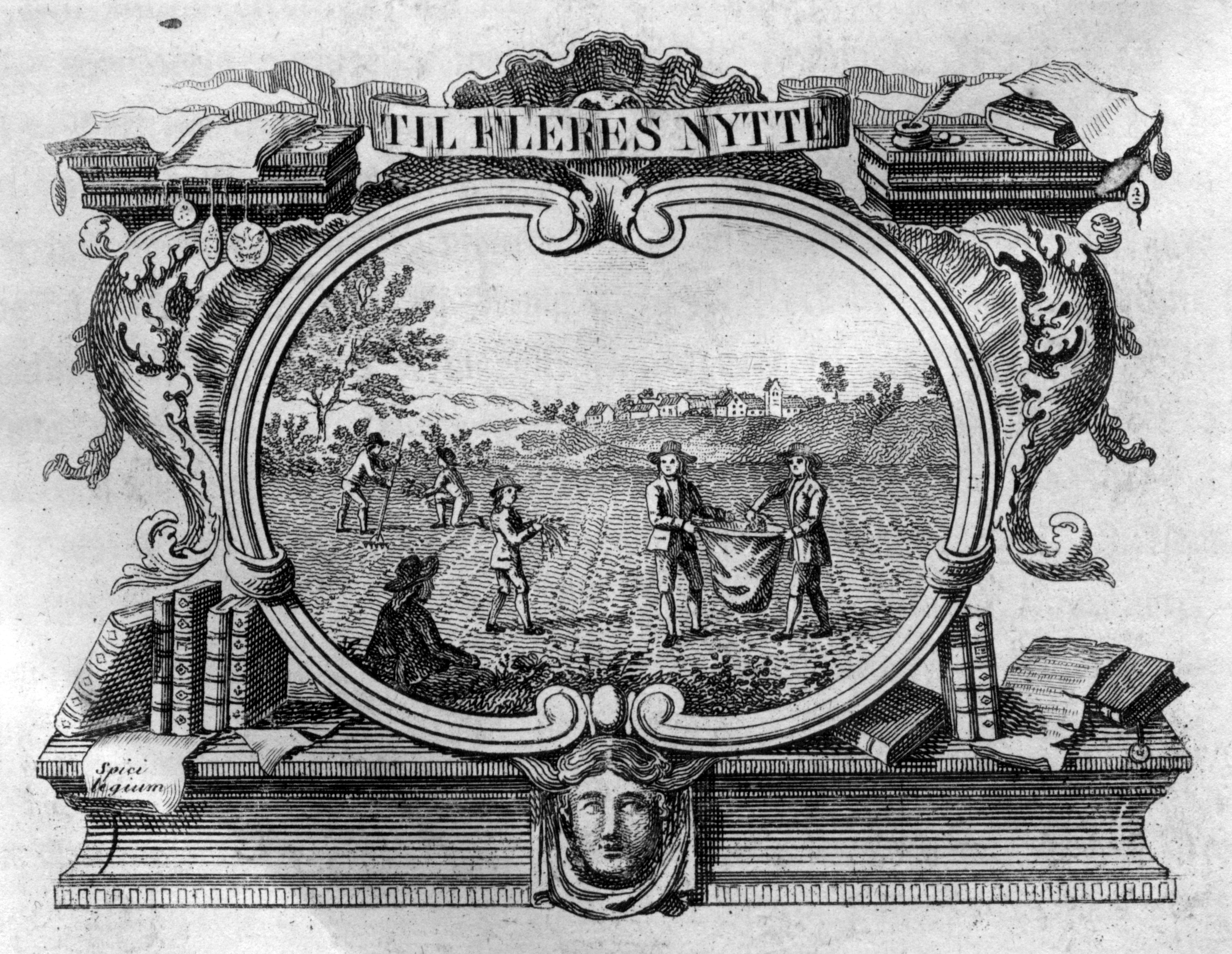
Holm's copperplate vignette for the Danish periodical Danske Magazin

Holm's many small works are still considered valuable. They are regarded with topographical and cultural interest as they provide representations of Golden Age Copenhagen, both in terms of the city as a whole and its individual buildings, including life in the streets. In addition, Holm's works are considered of high artistic quality due to their high technical quality and colour.

== Gallery ==
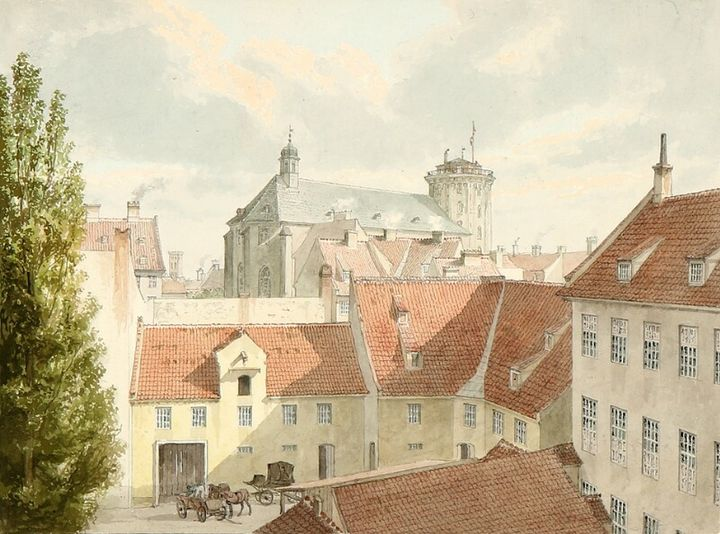
Trinitatis Church and Rundetårn: watercolour

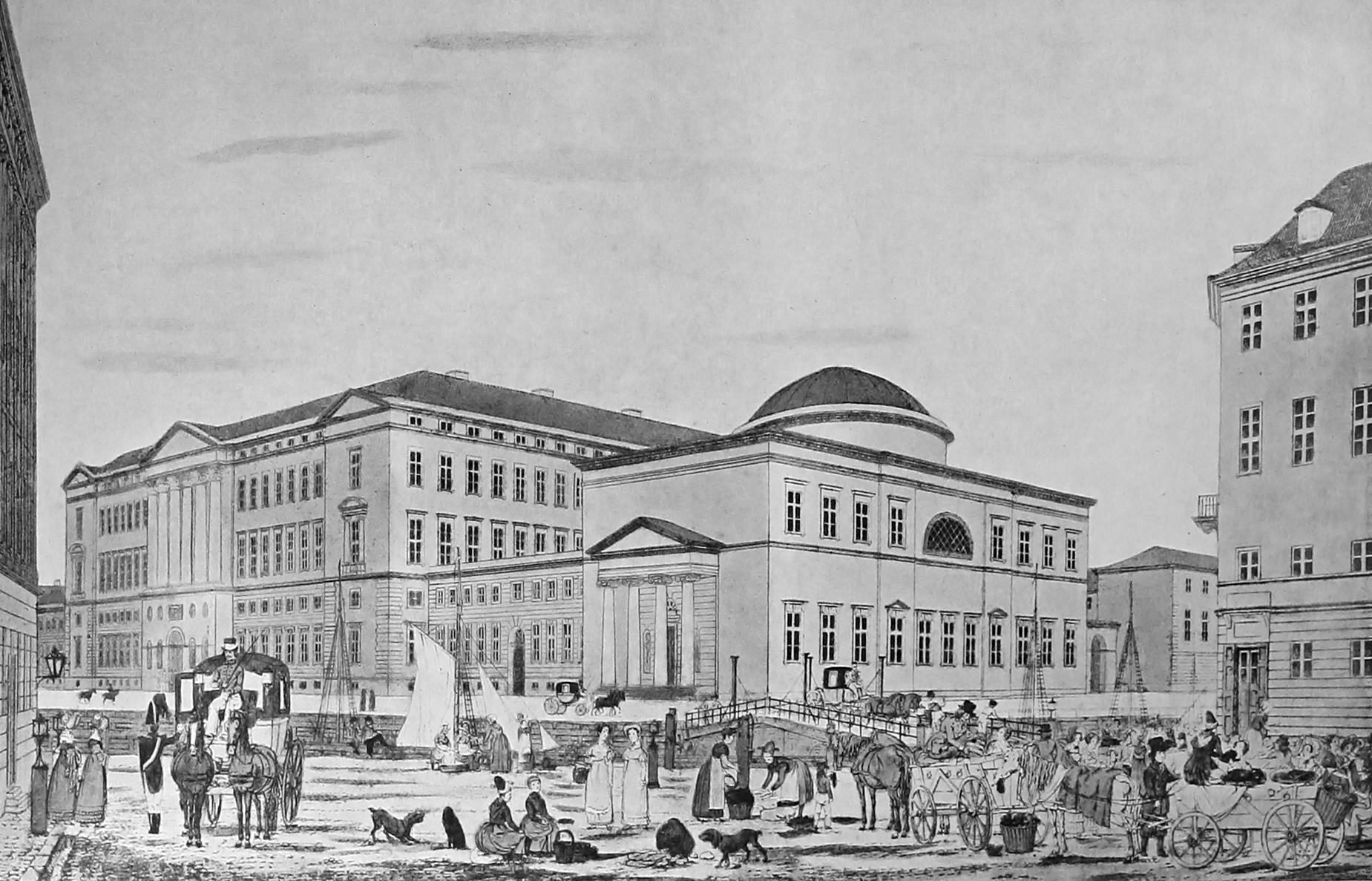
Christiansborg Palace

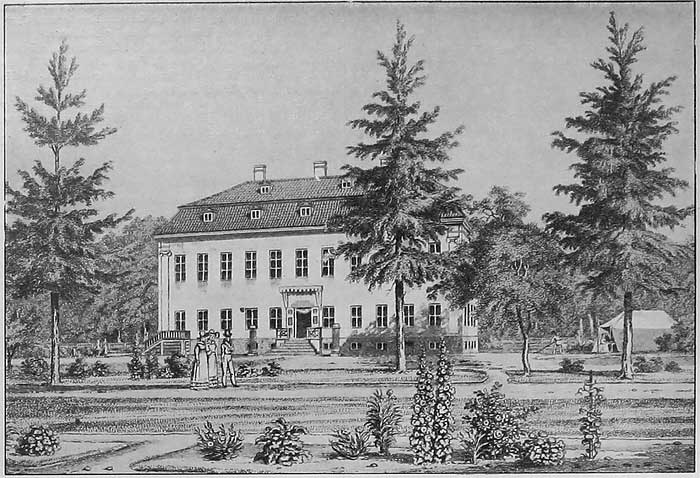
Charlottenlund

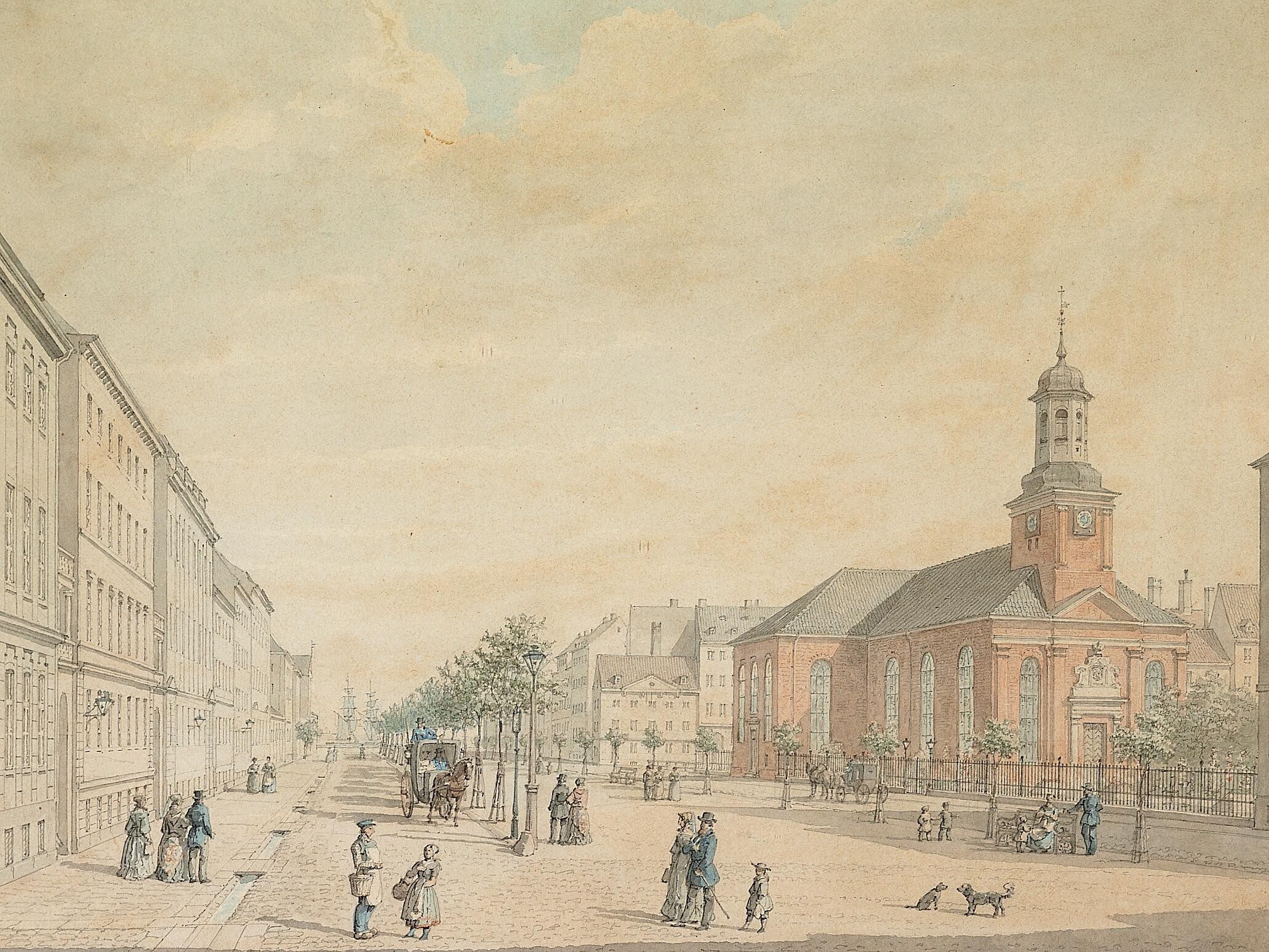
Sankt Annæ Plads, watercolour

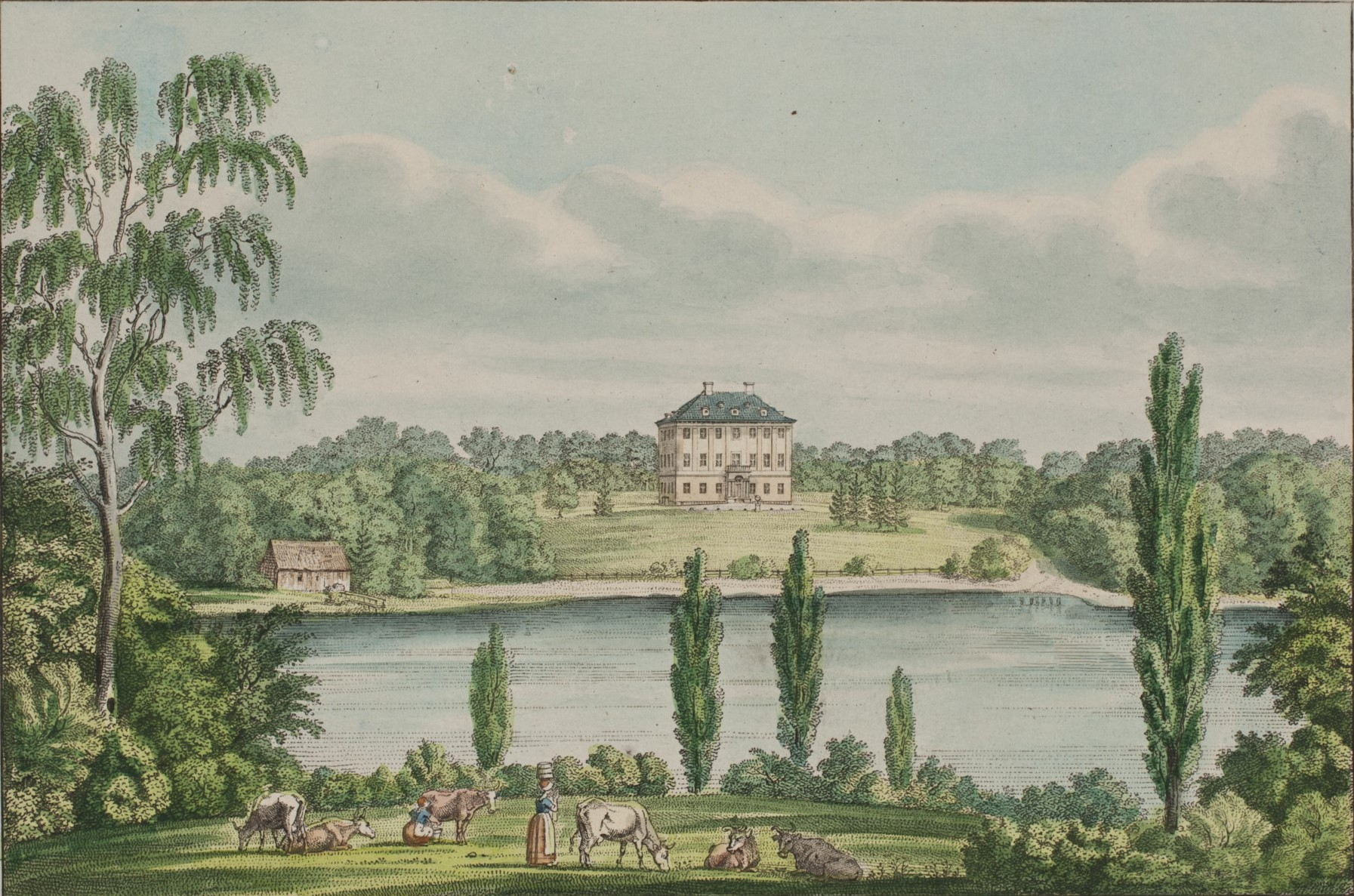
Dronninggård (1826)

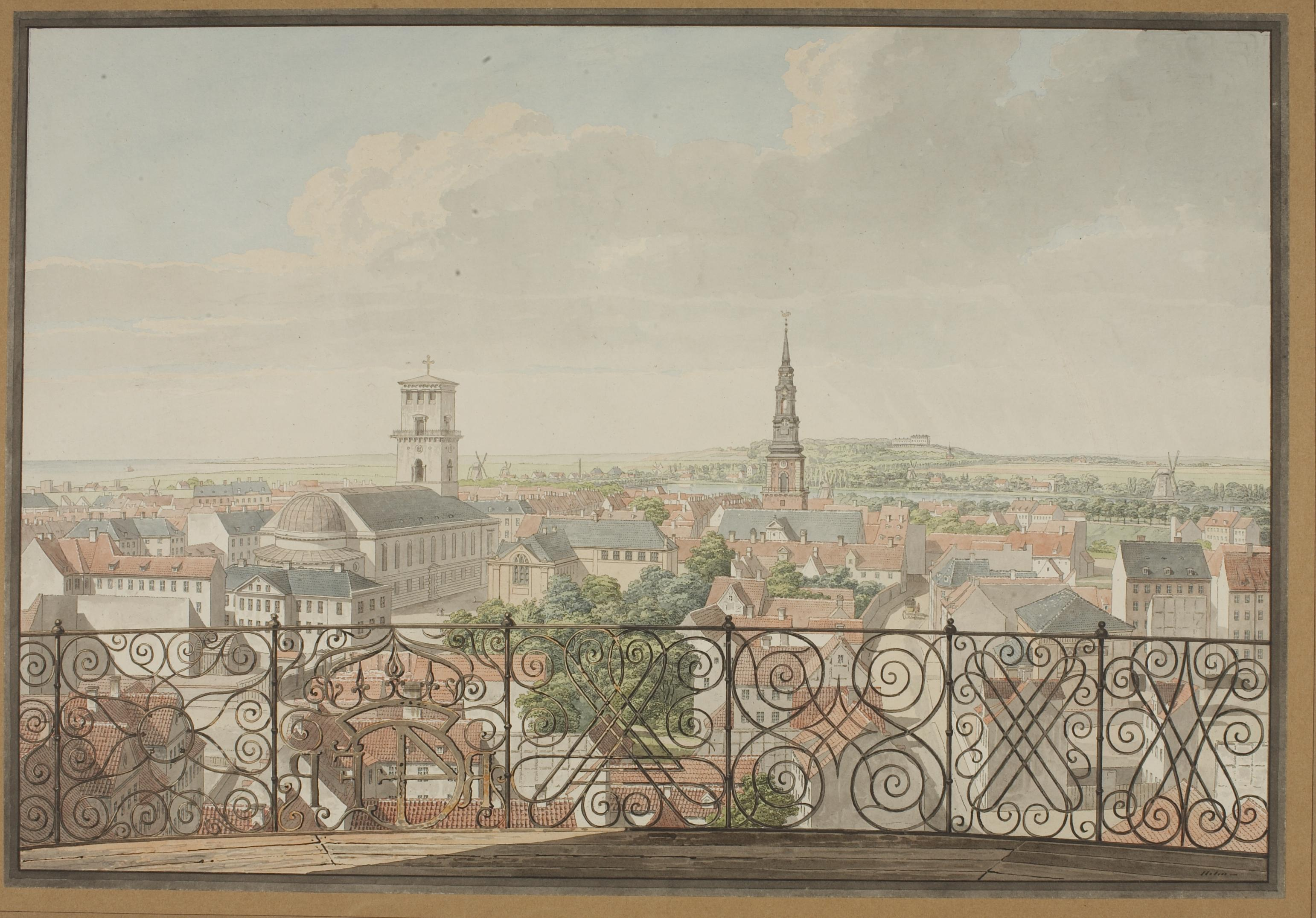
(1804–1861) Udsigt fra Rundetårn

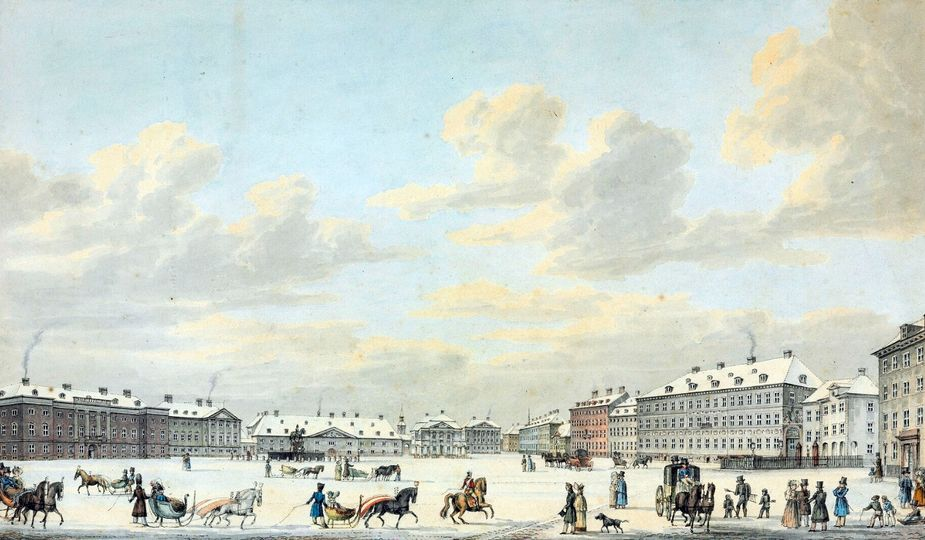
Kgs. Nytorv, (1830)

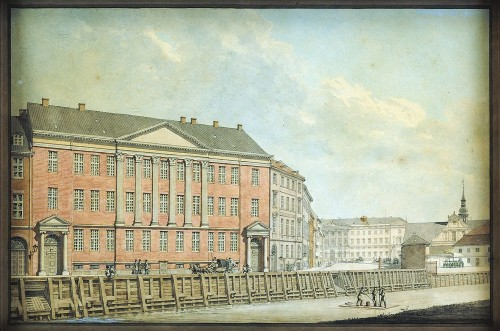
Peschiers Gård (1803)

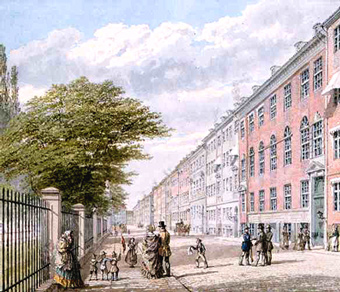
Kronprinsessegade (1845)

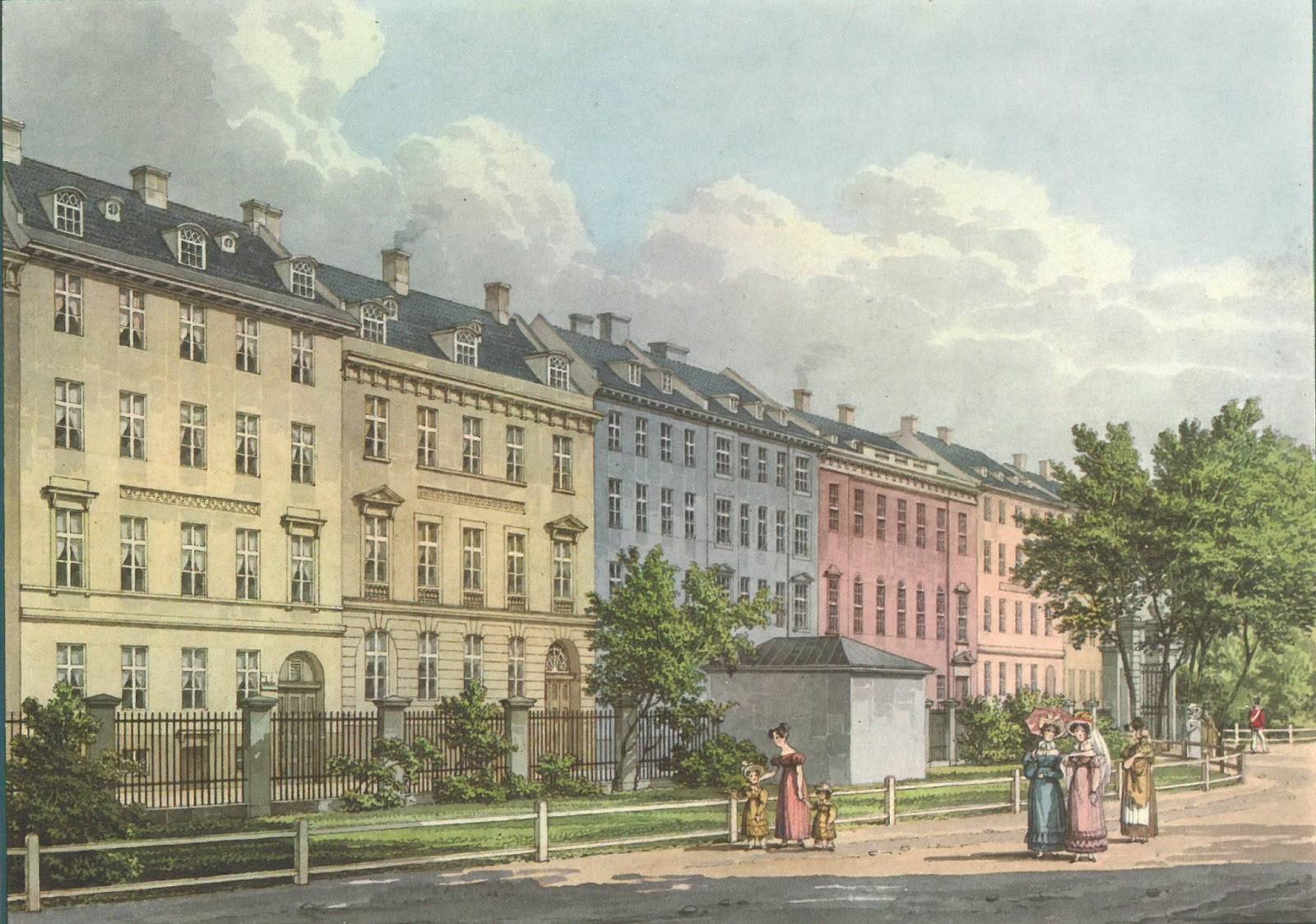
Kronprinsessegade (1830)

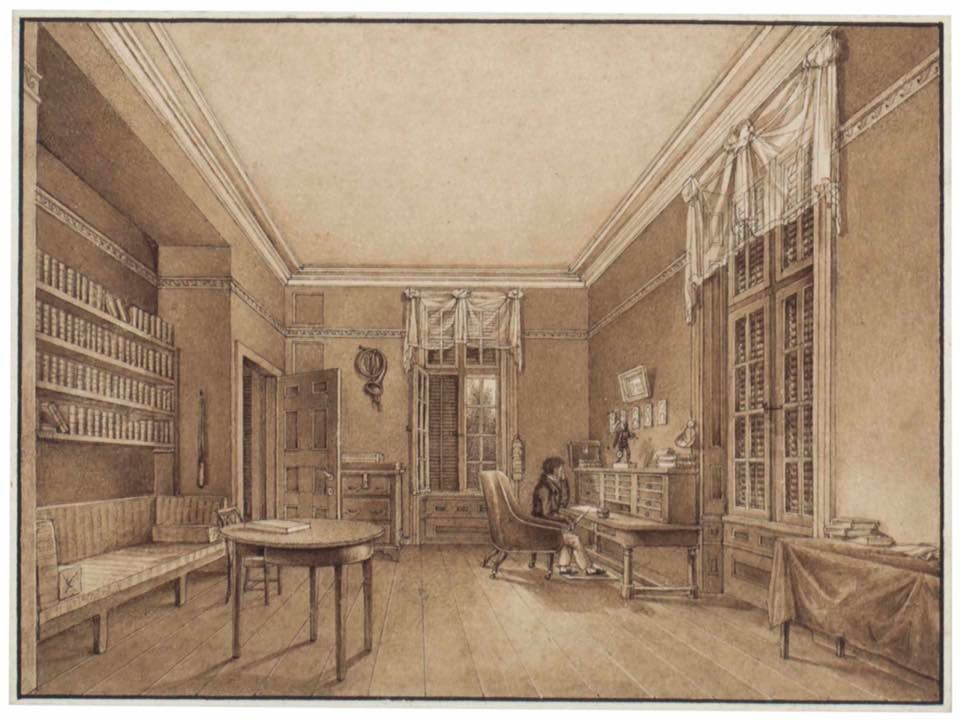
View of an Interior (1826)

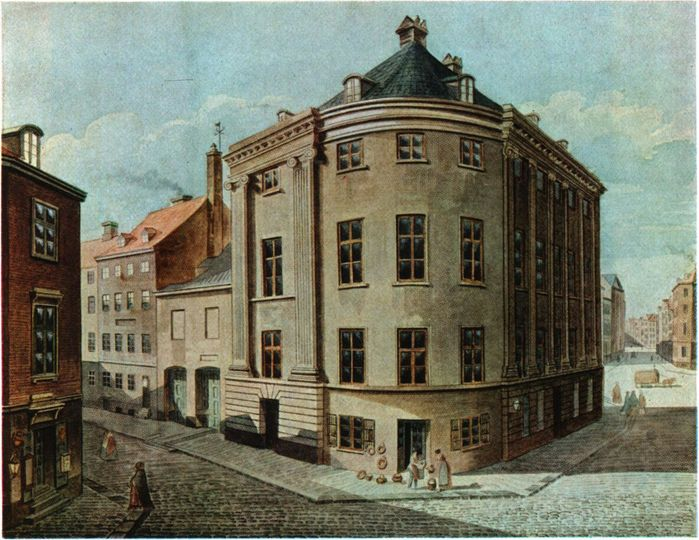
Tutein House

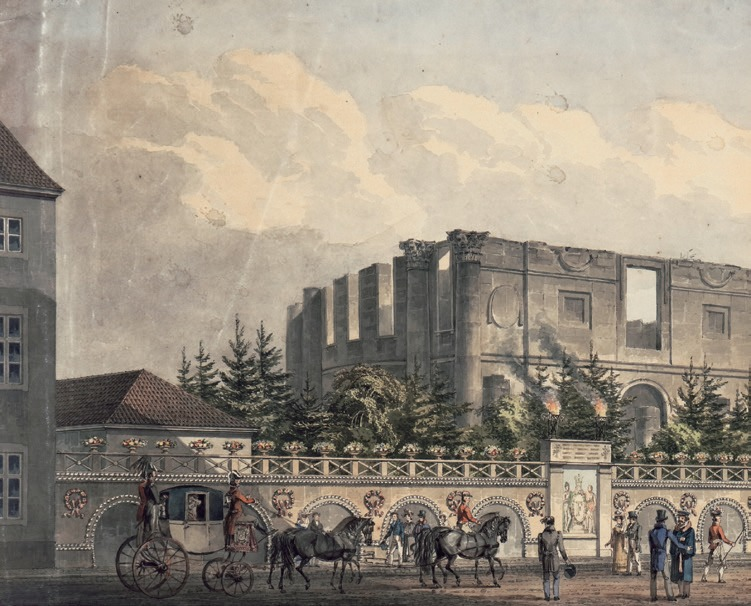
(1829)

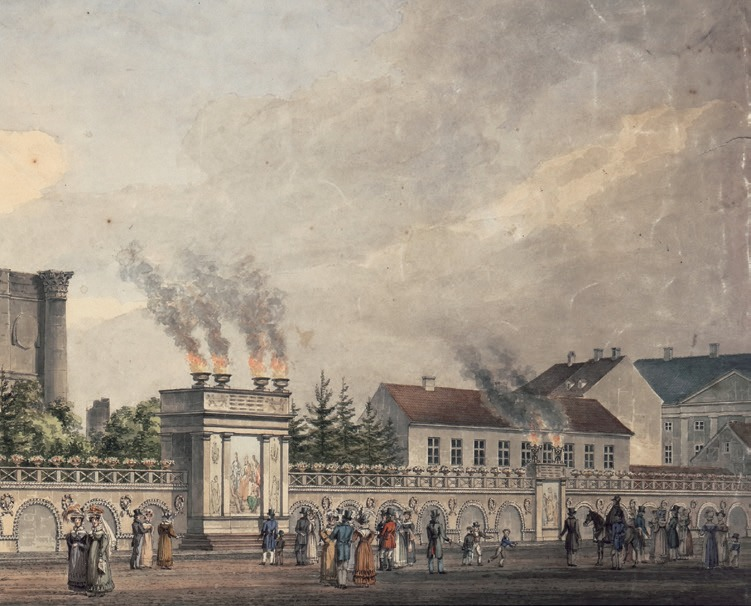
(1829)

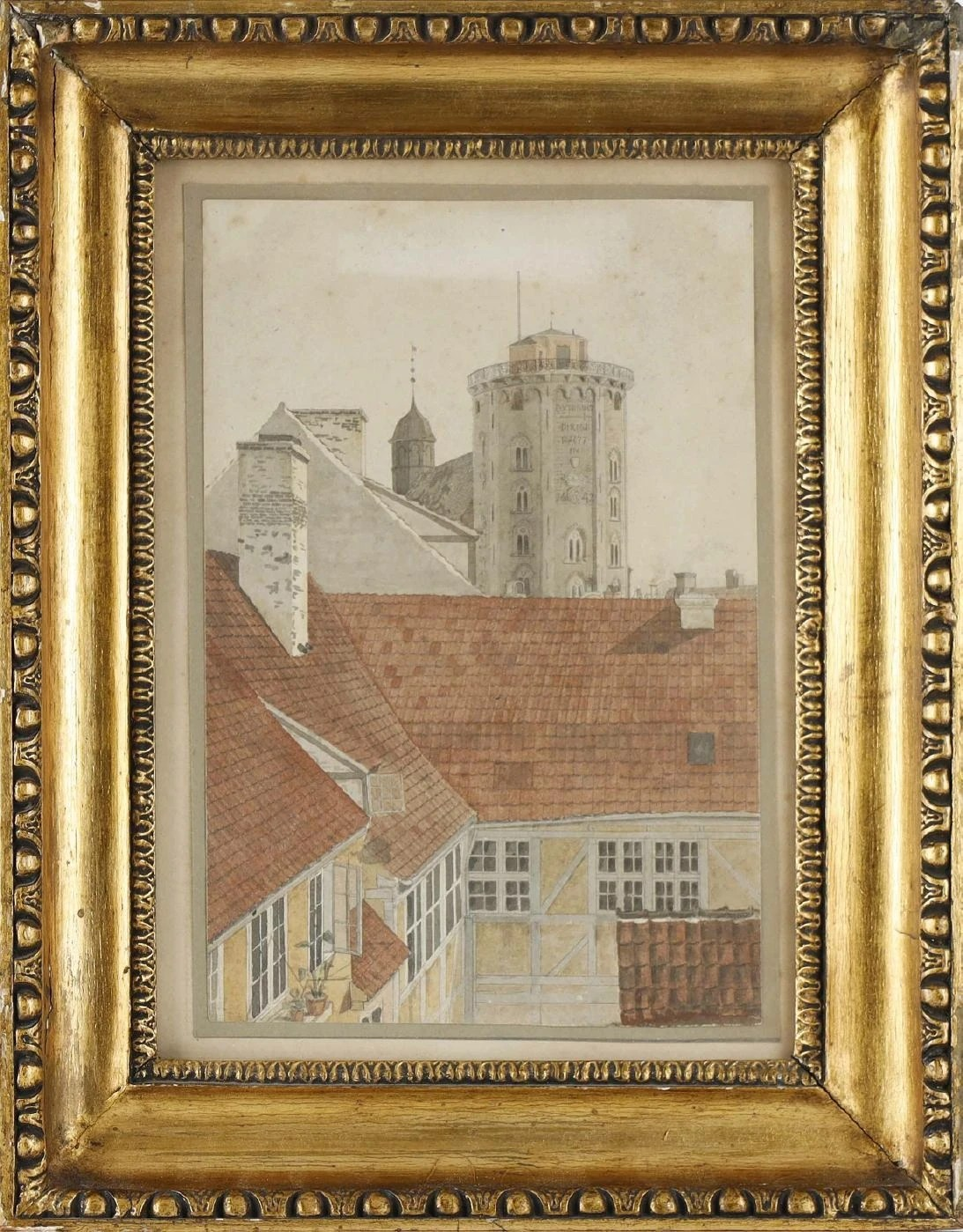
View from backyard towards Rundetårn

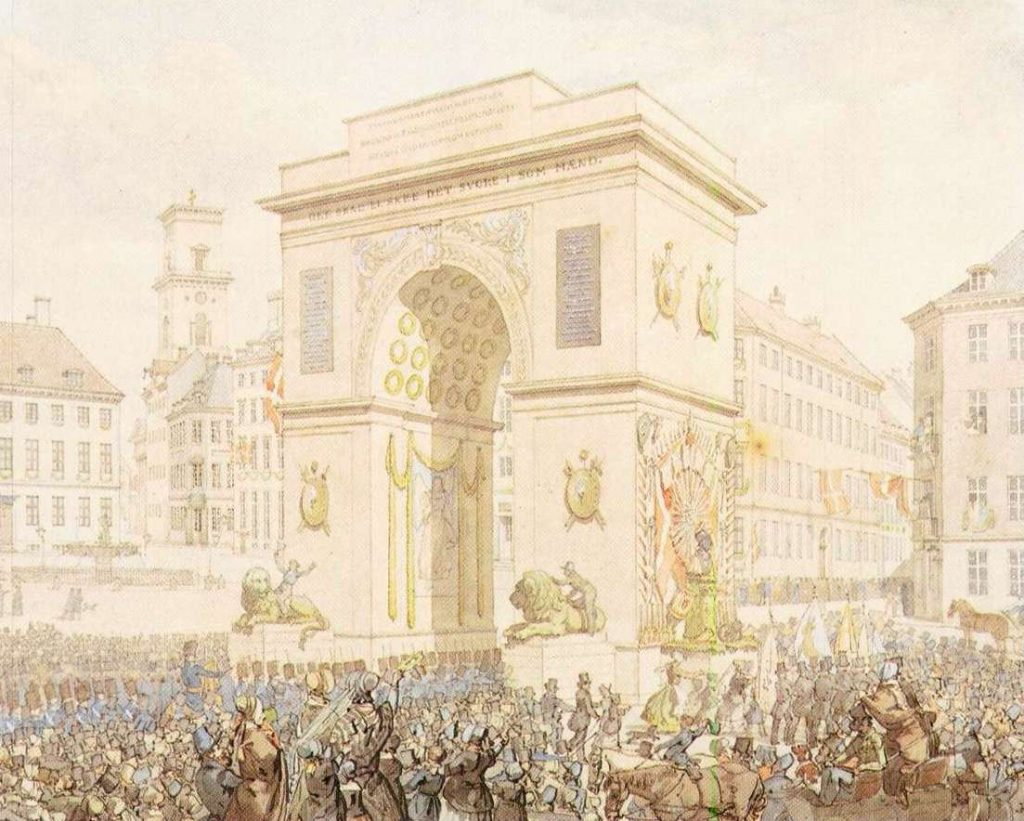
(1851)

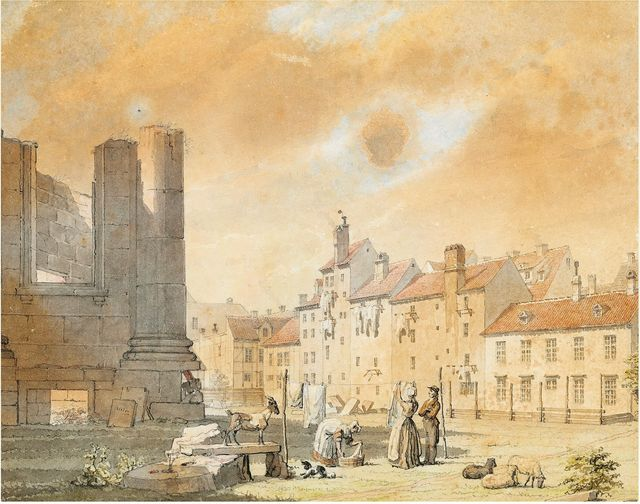

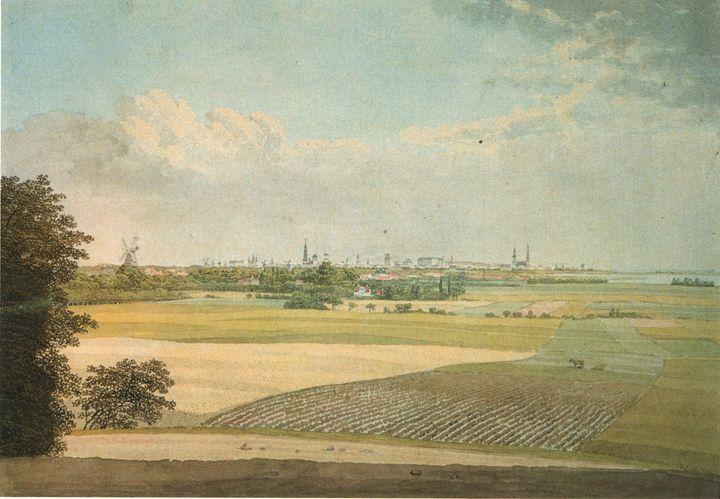
(1852)

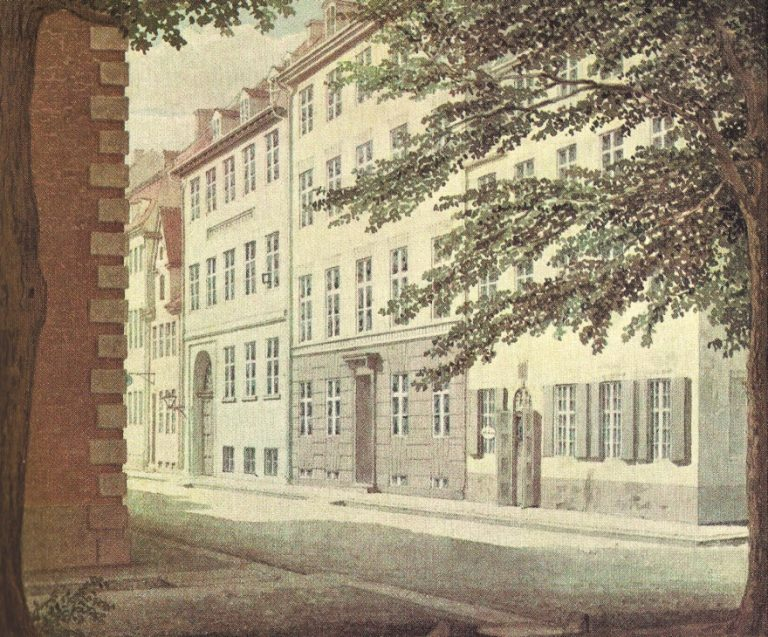
Løngangsstræde

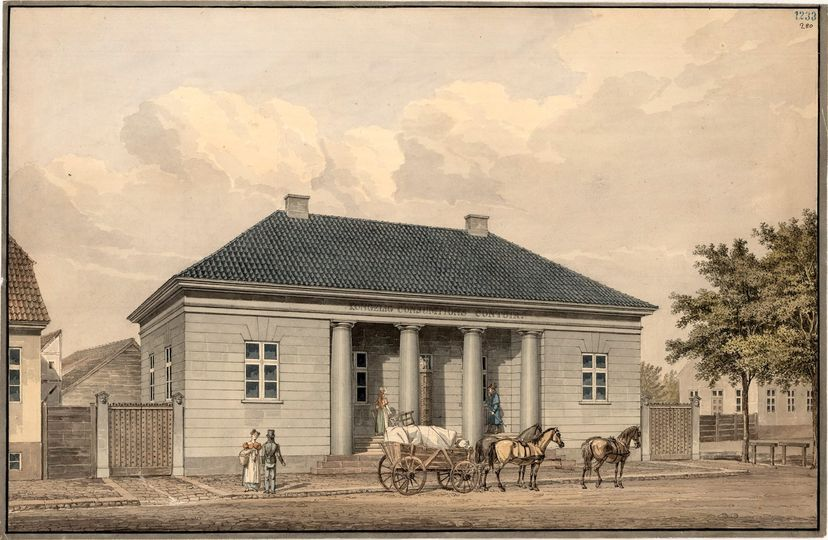
(1830)

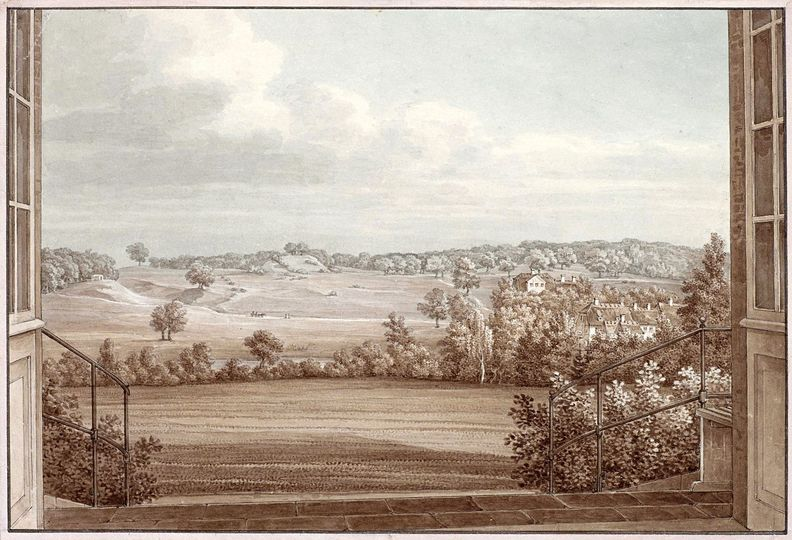
View Outside from the Garden Hall at Frederiksdal Manor House

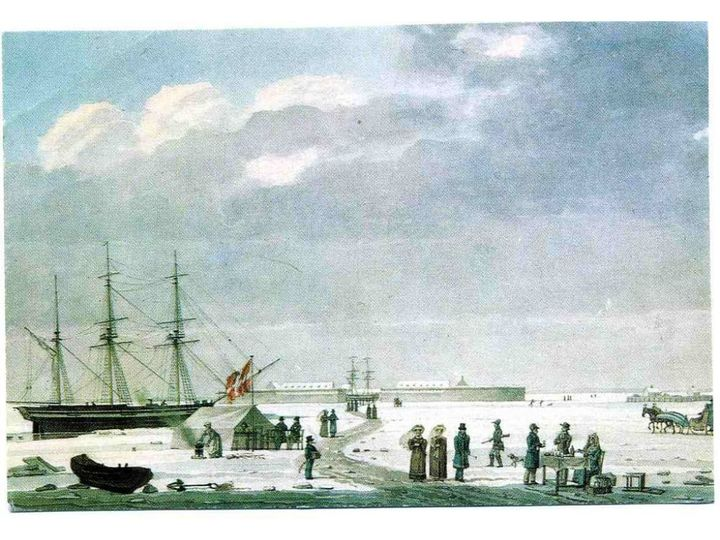

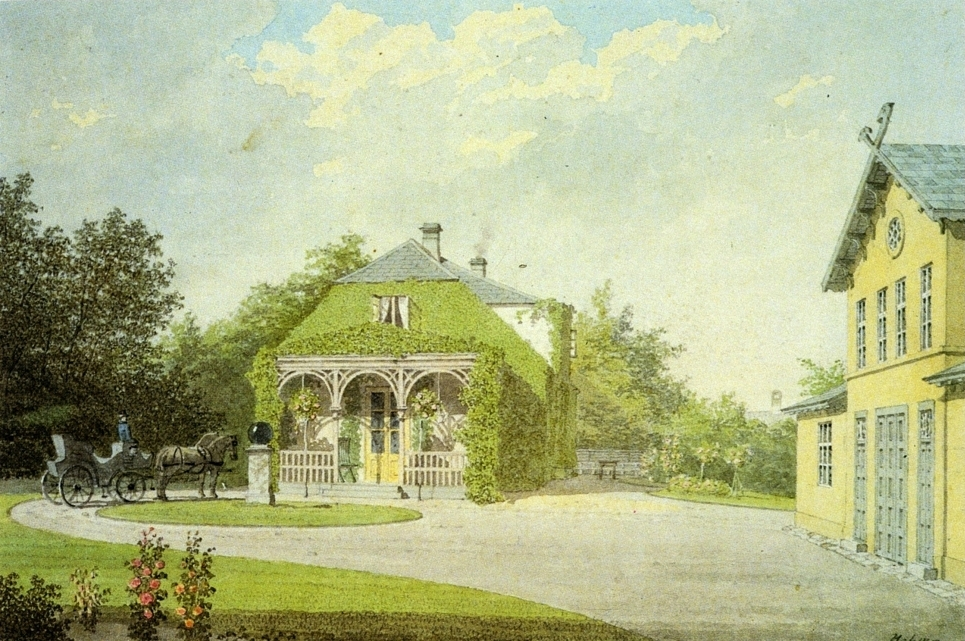
Bakkehuset i Vedbæk (1858)

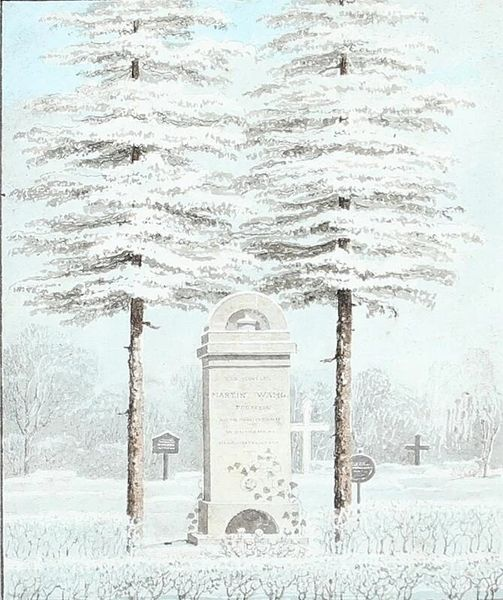
Botanist and zoologist Martin Vahl Henrichsen's tombstone at Assistens Kirkegård

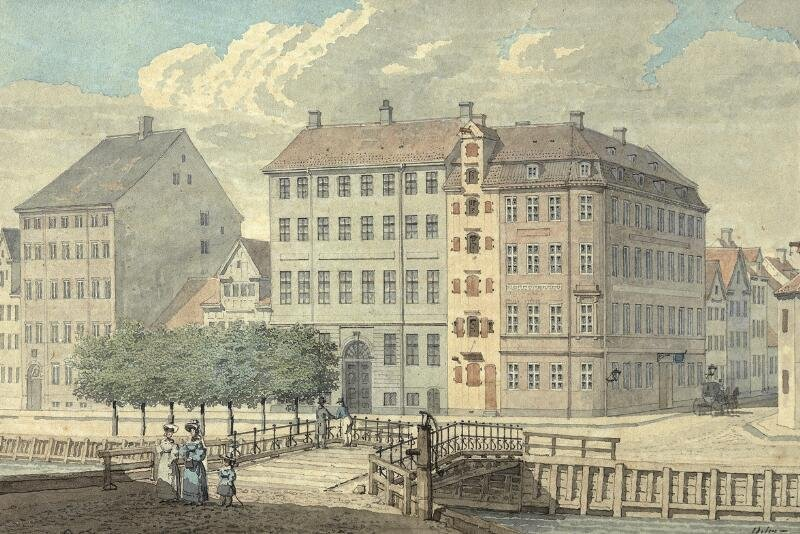

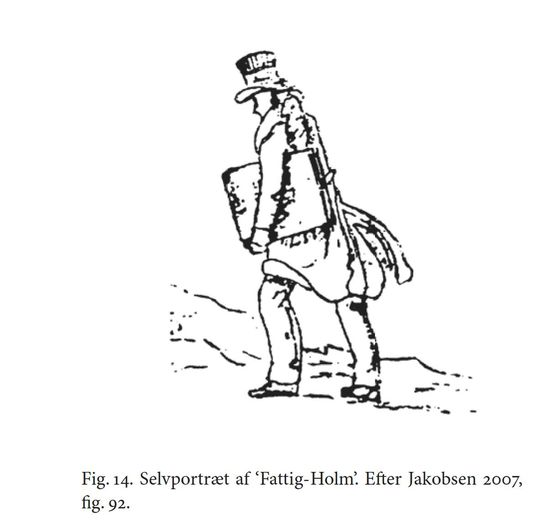
Self Portrait

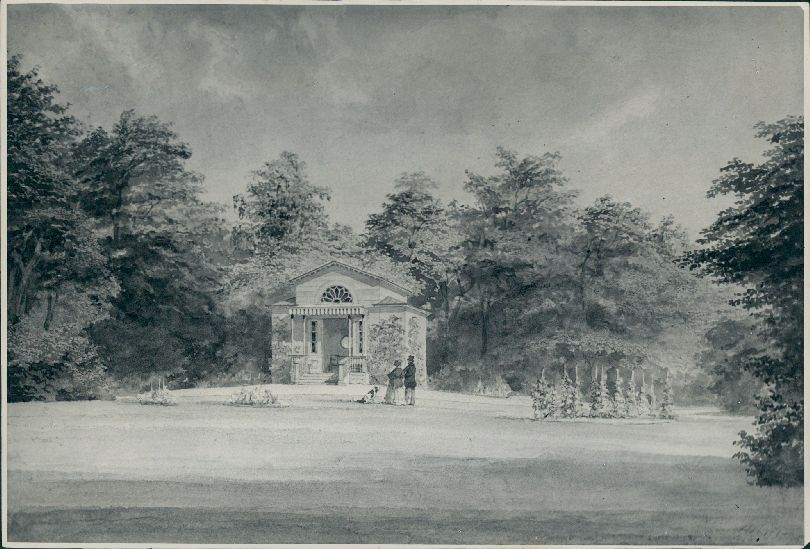
Garden interior with pavilion from old Frederiksberg property

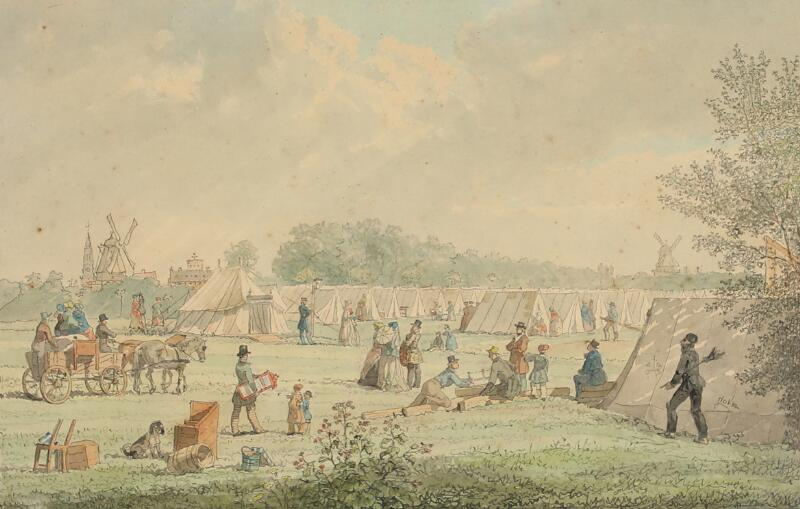
(1853)

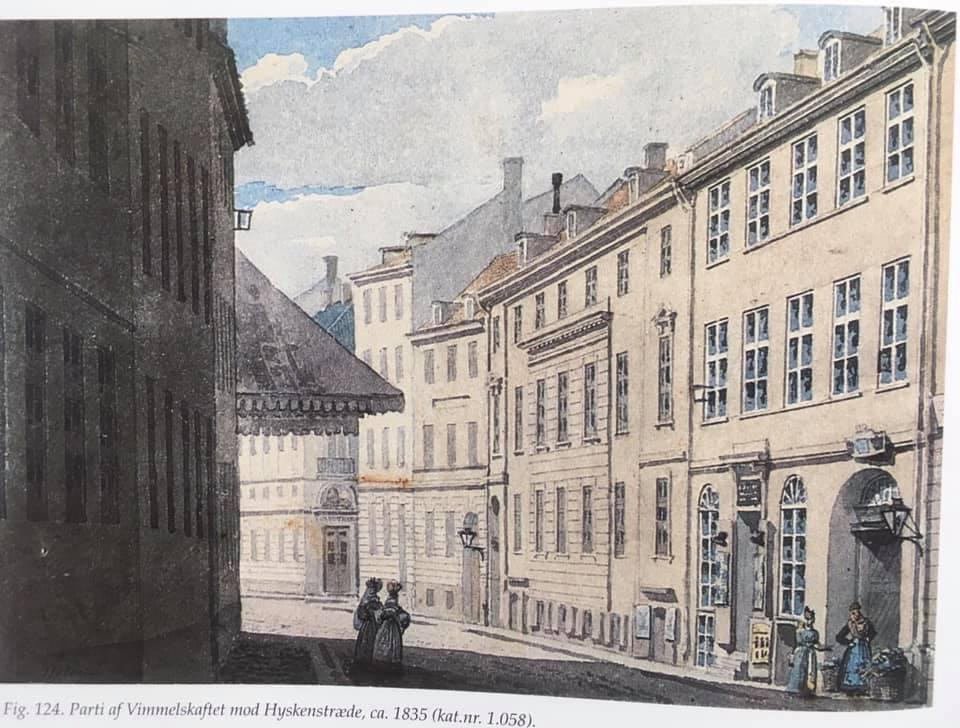
(1835)

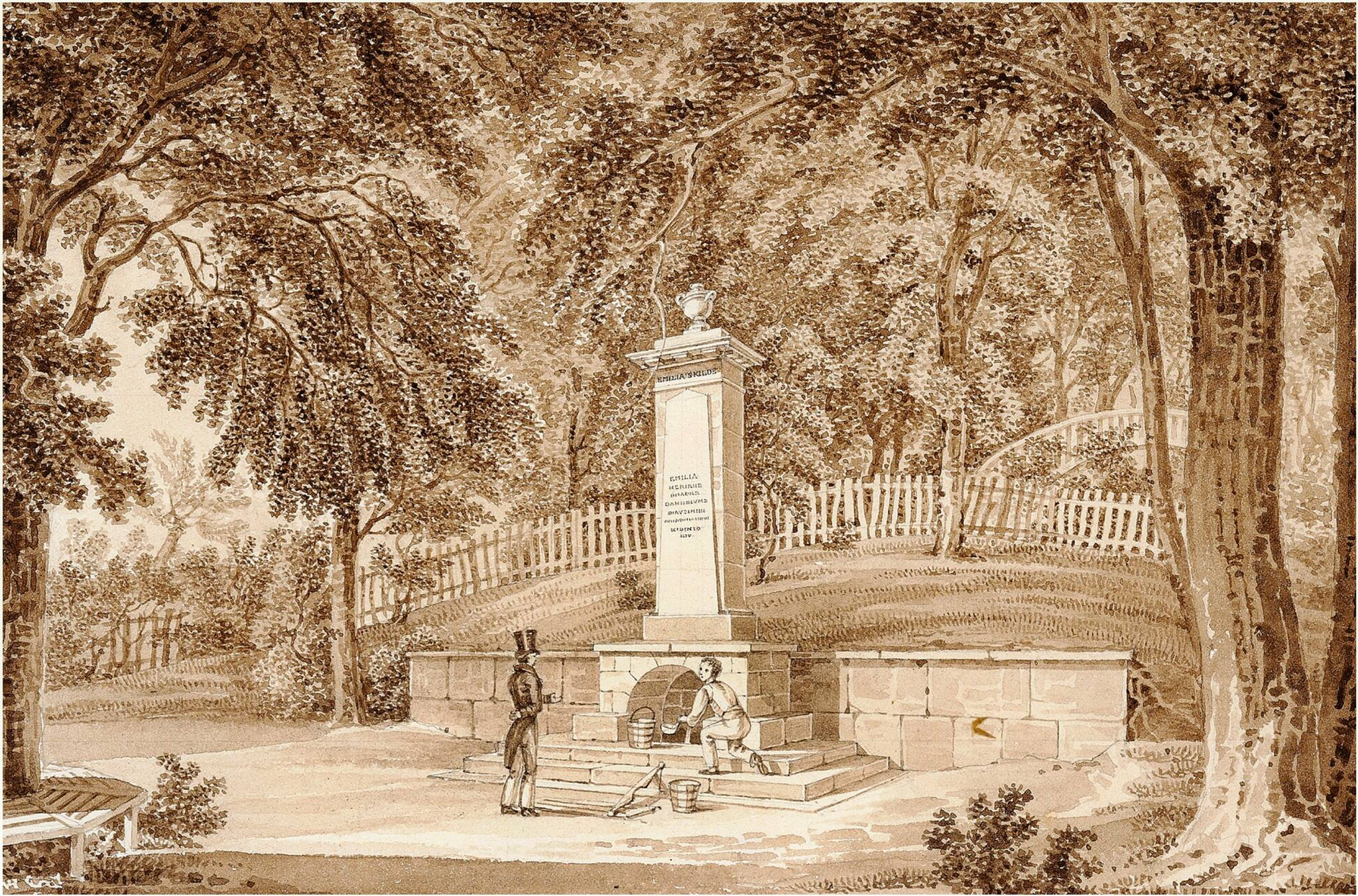

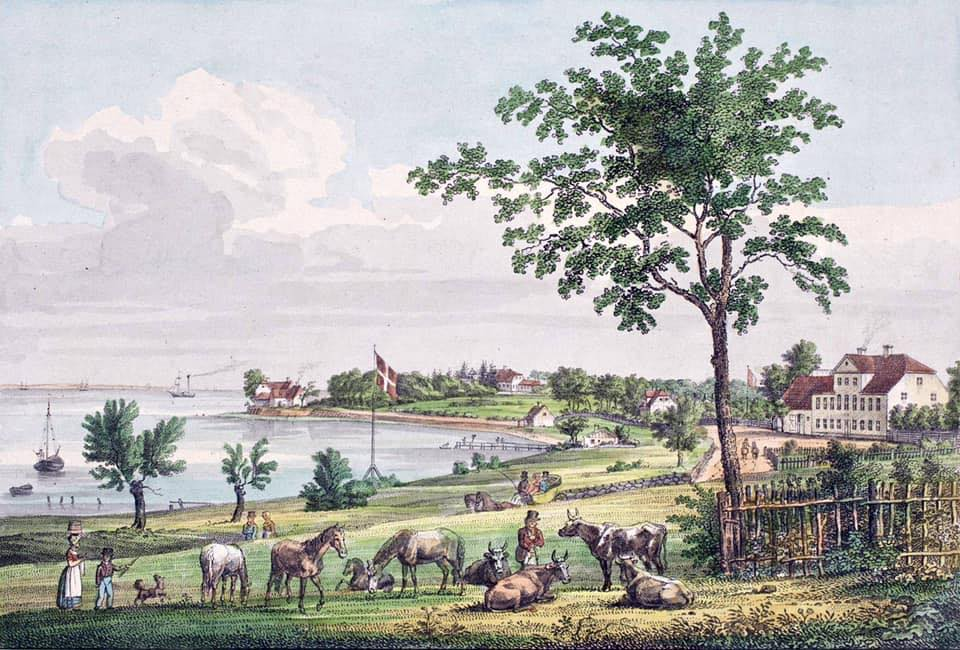

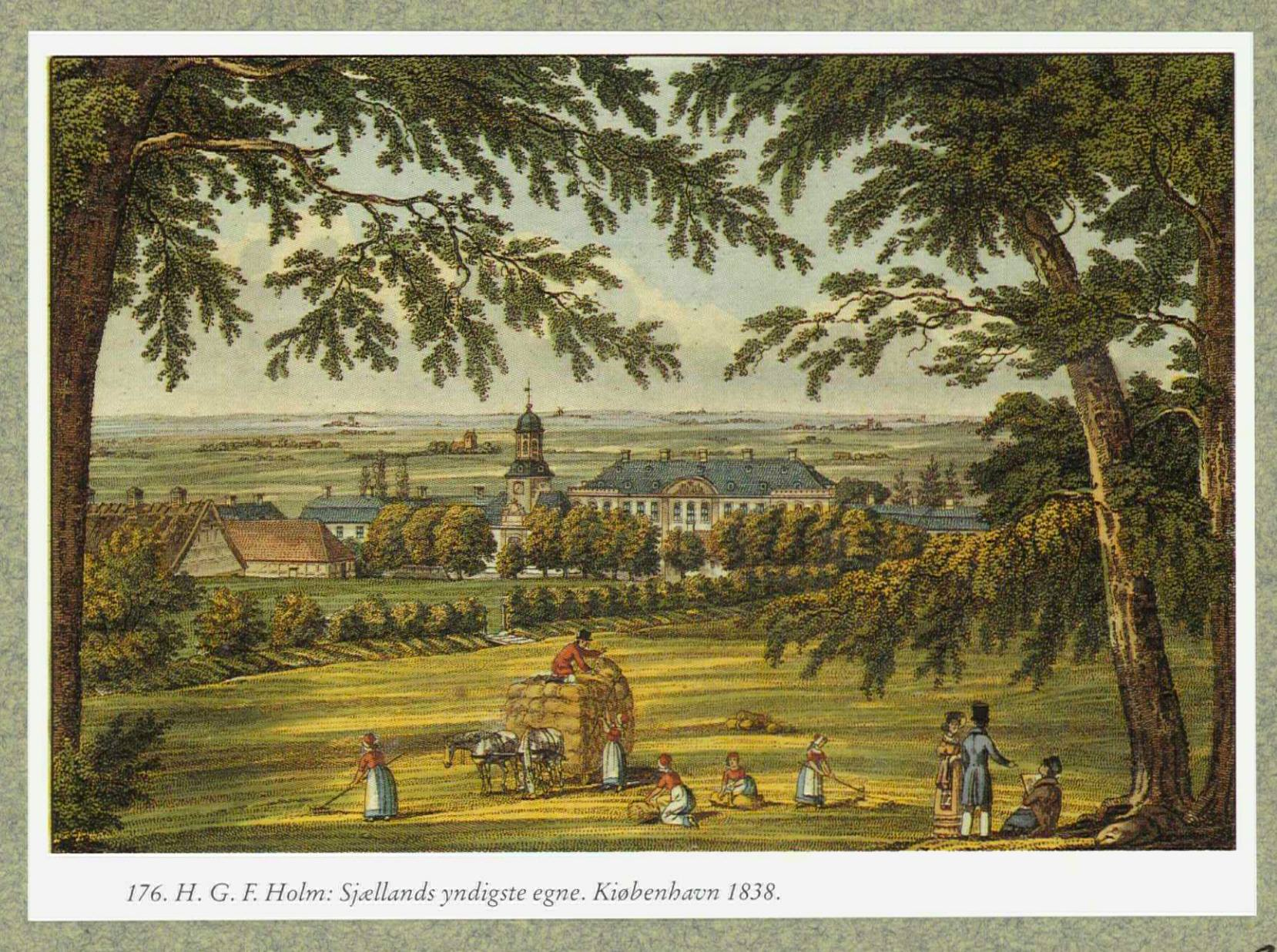
(1838)

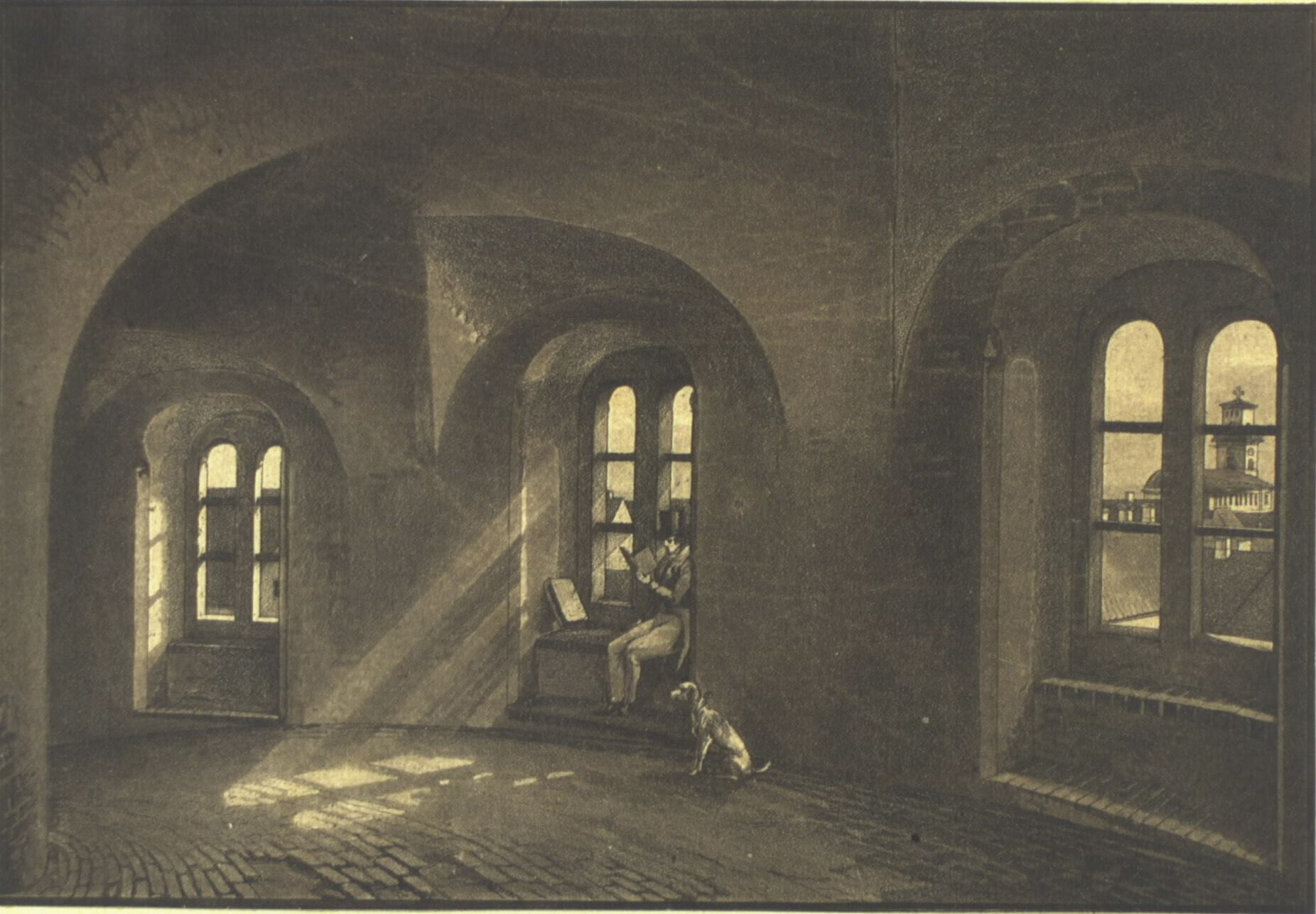

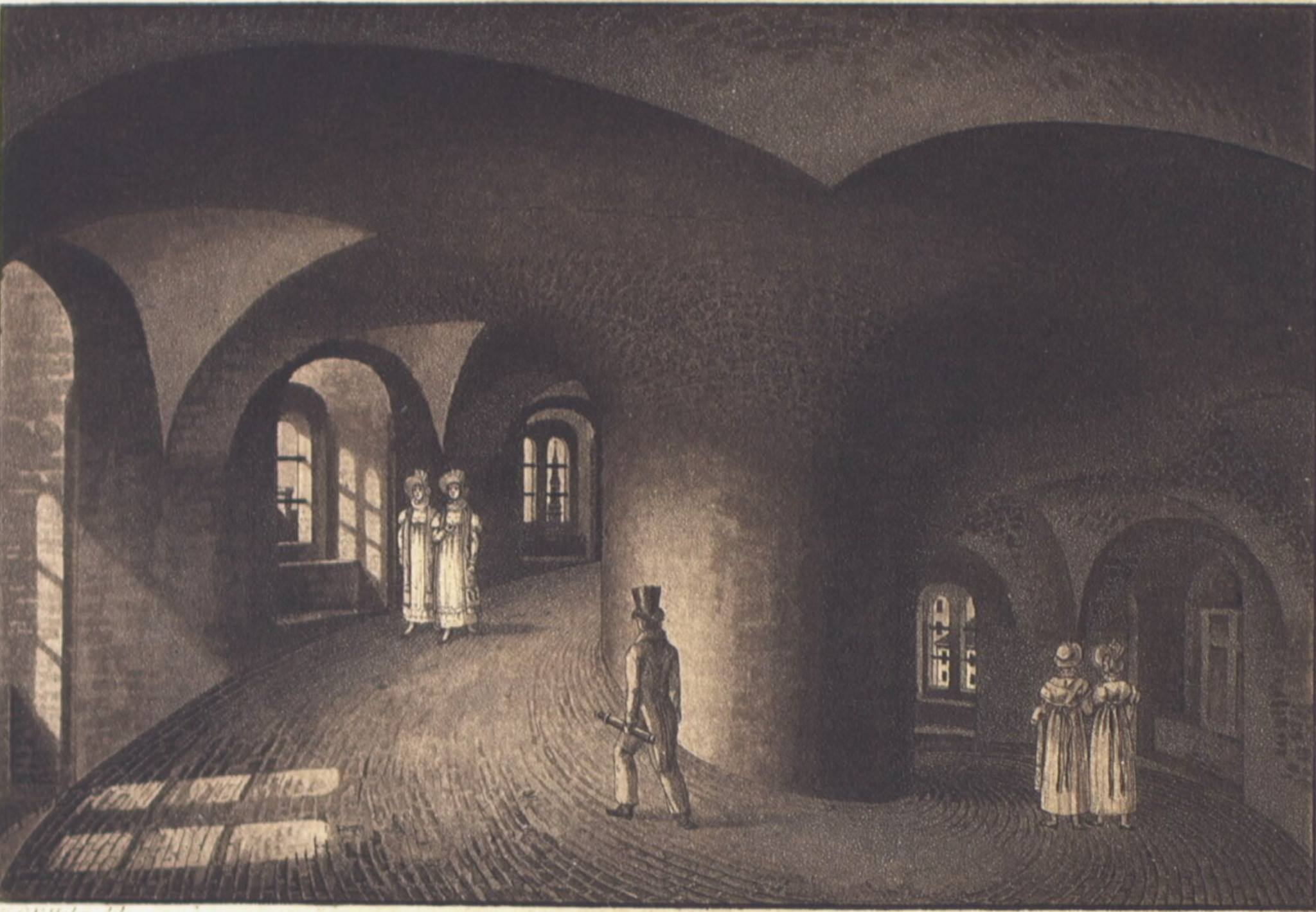

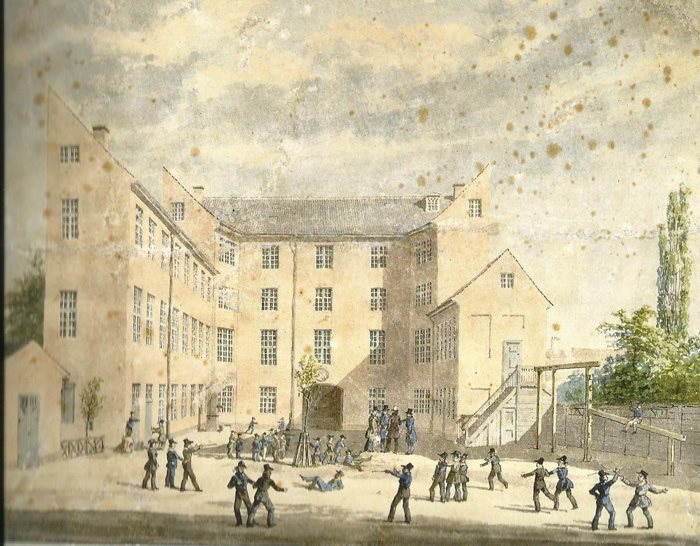

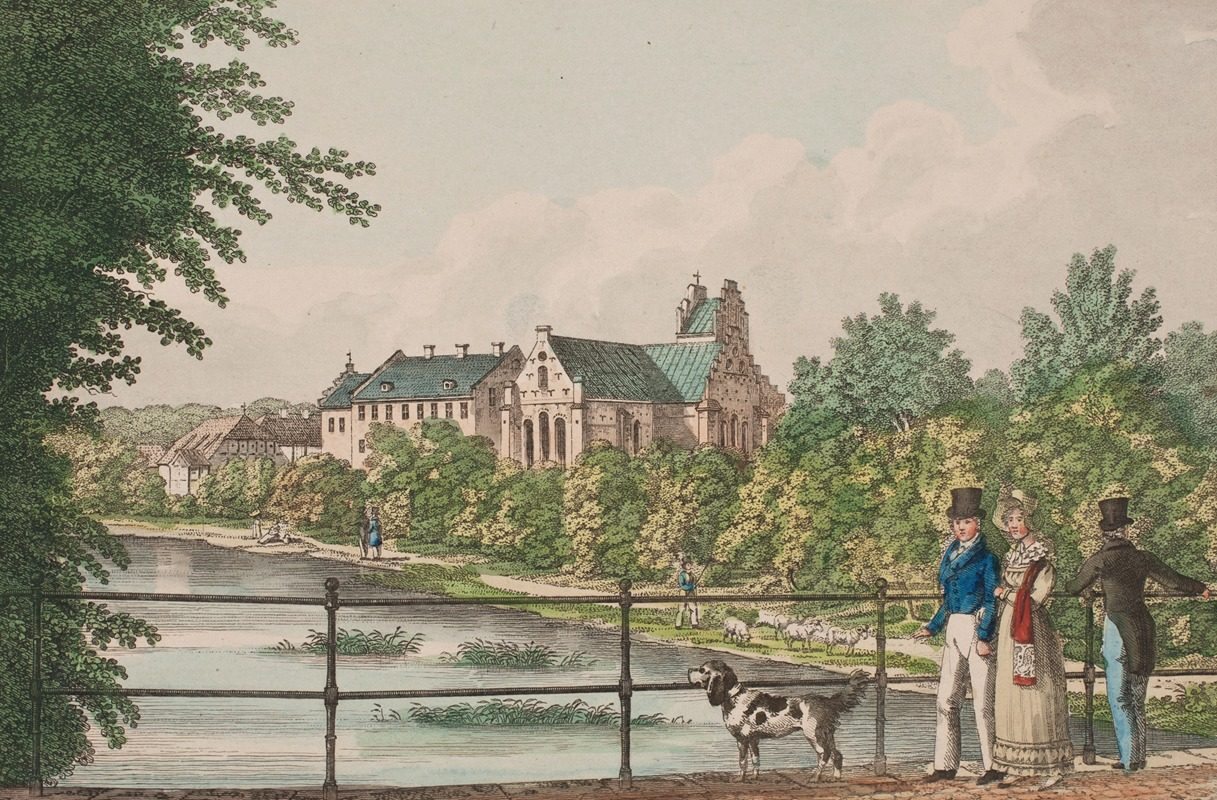
Herlufsholm

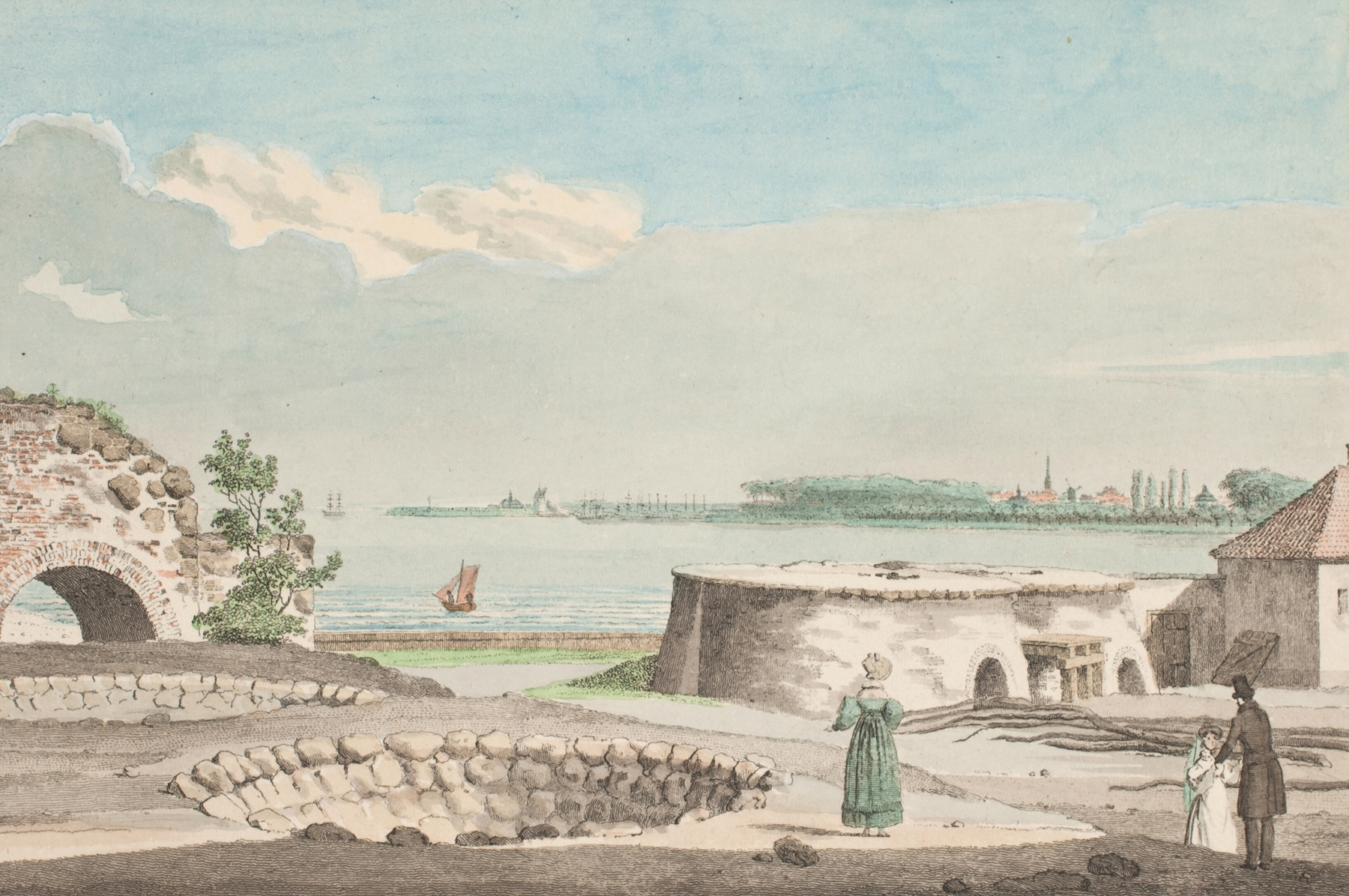
København set fra Gl. Kalkbrænderi

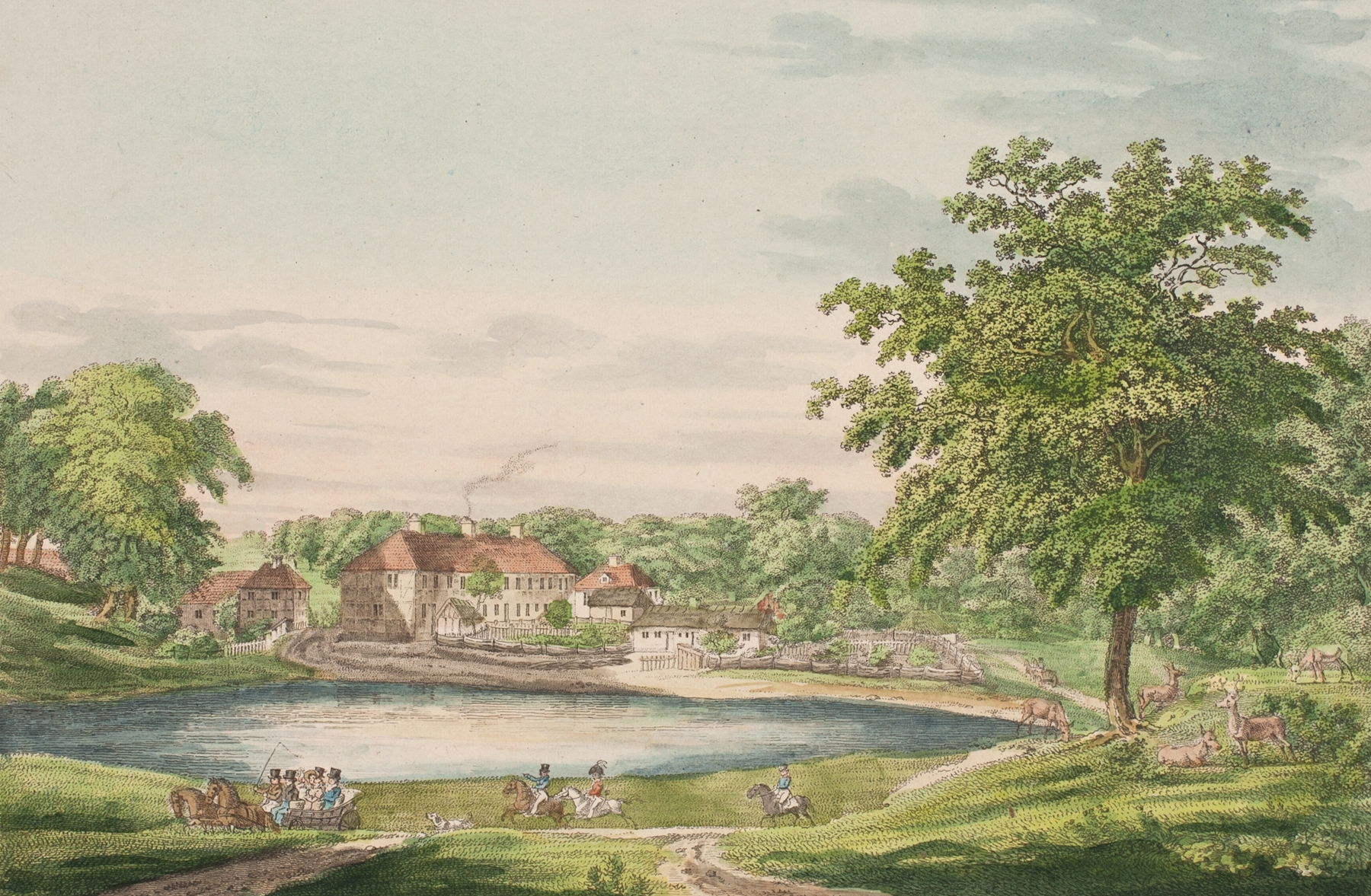
Rådvaddam i Dyrehaven

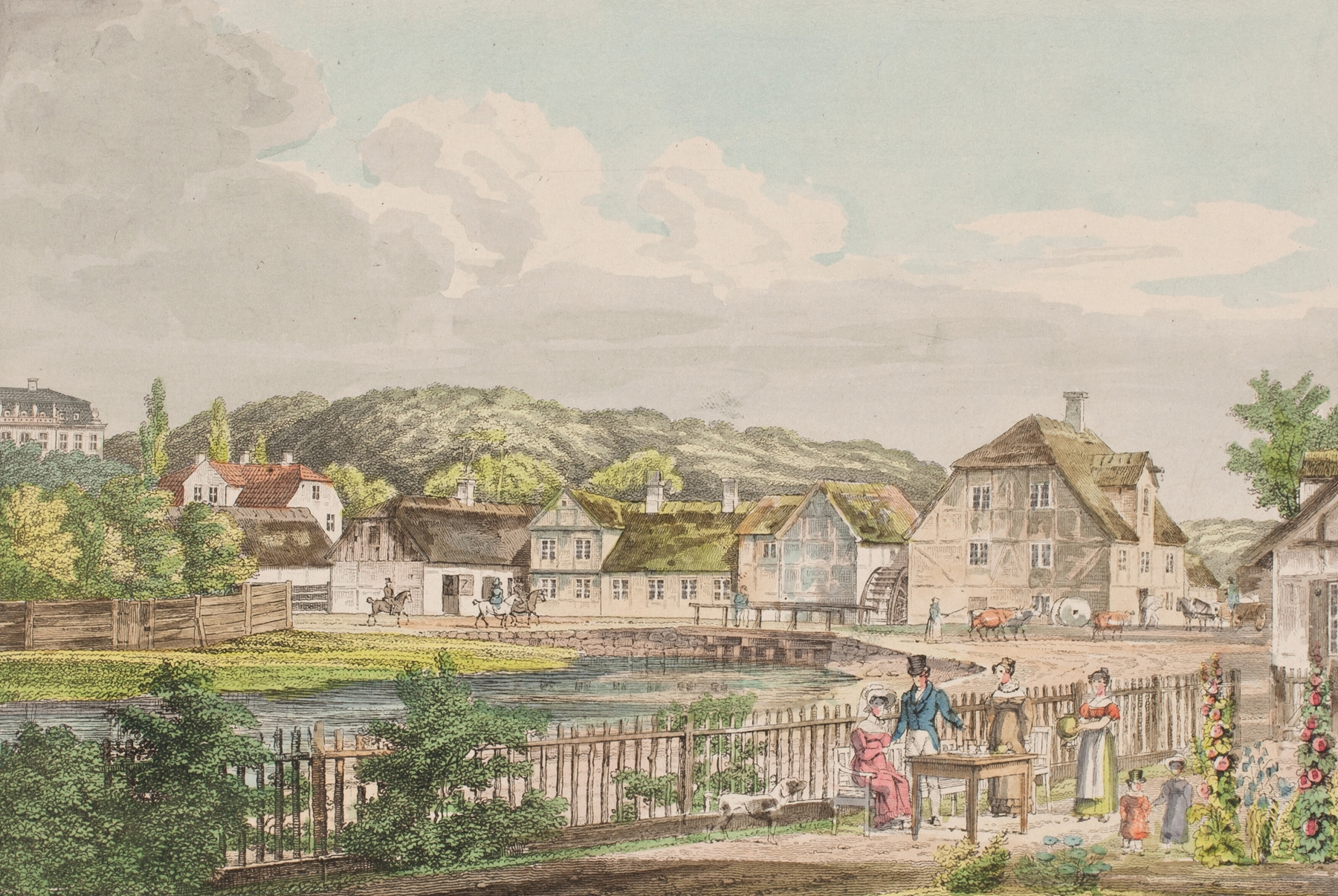
Parti af Frederiksdal

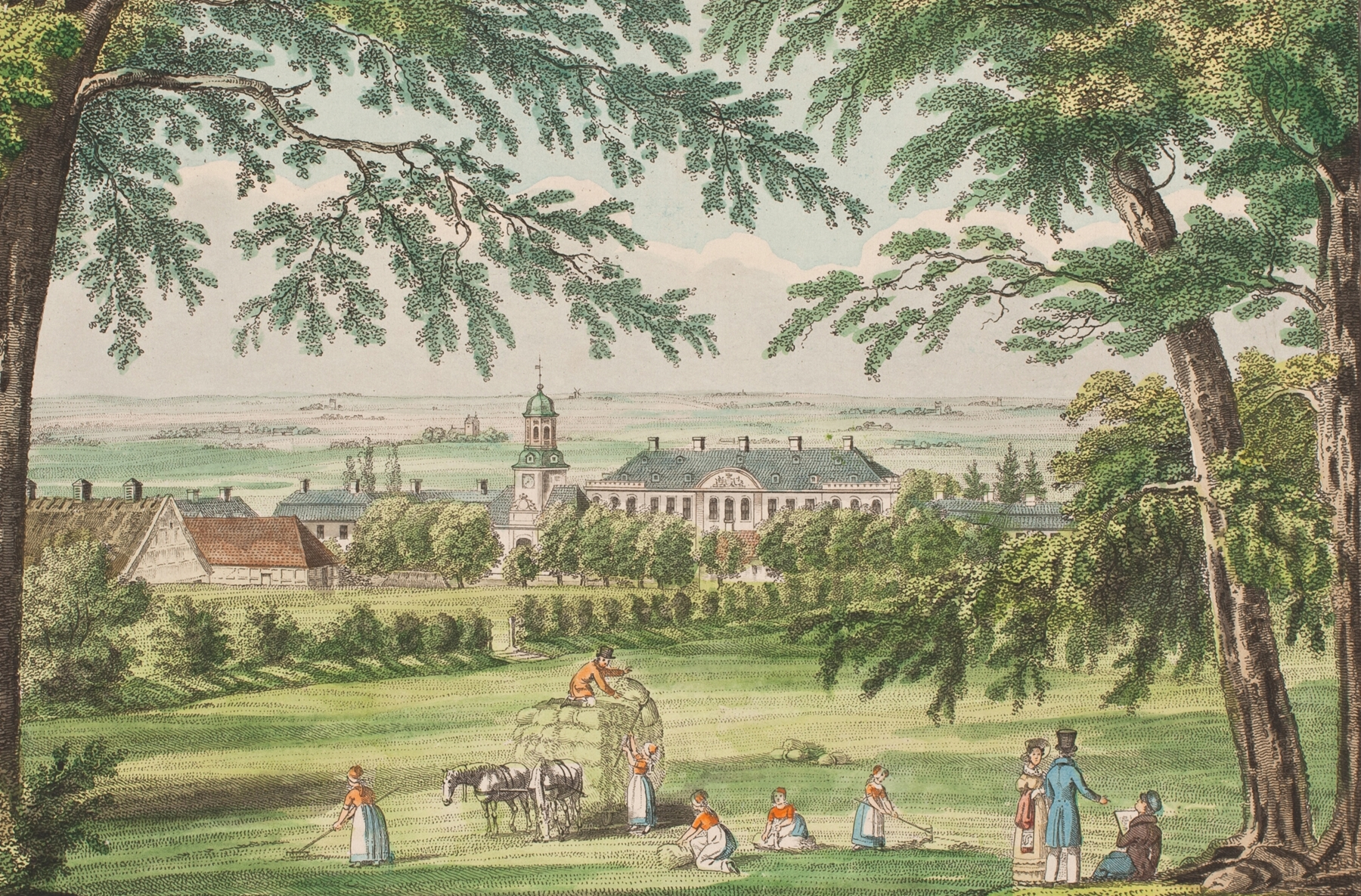
Lethraborg

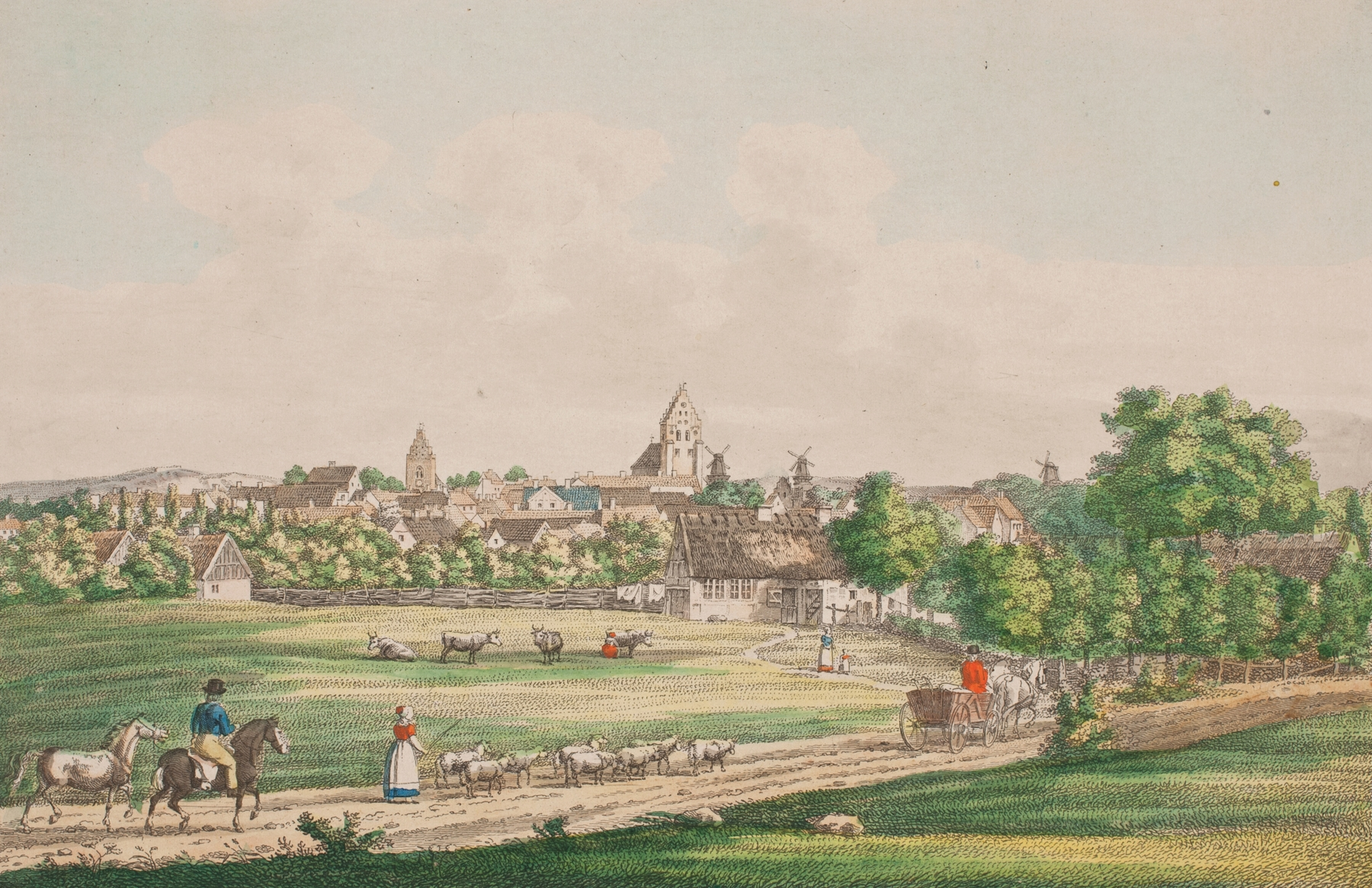
Næstved

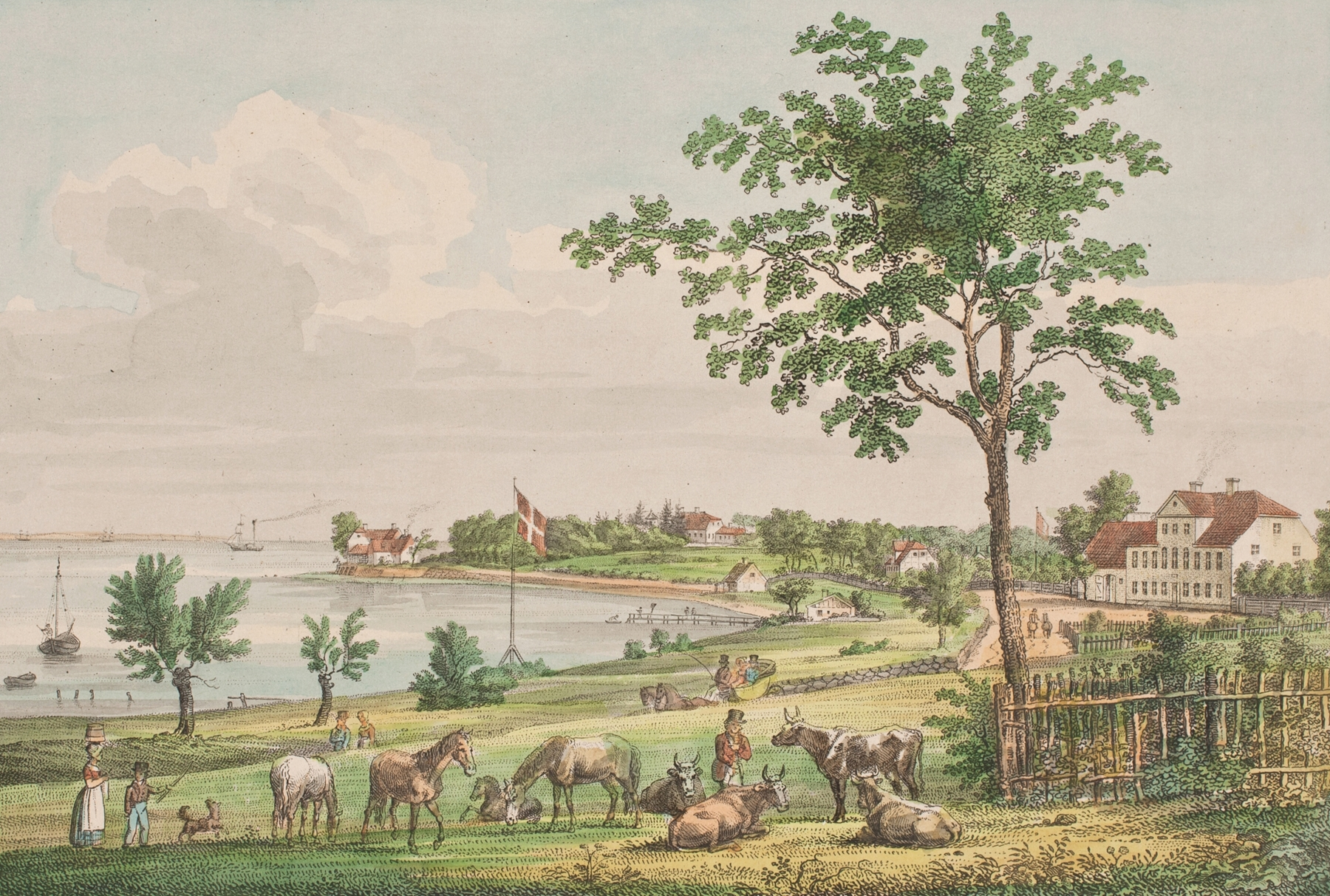
Udsigt ved Bellevue

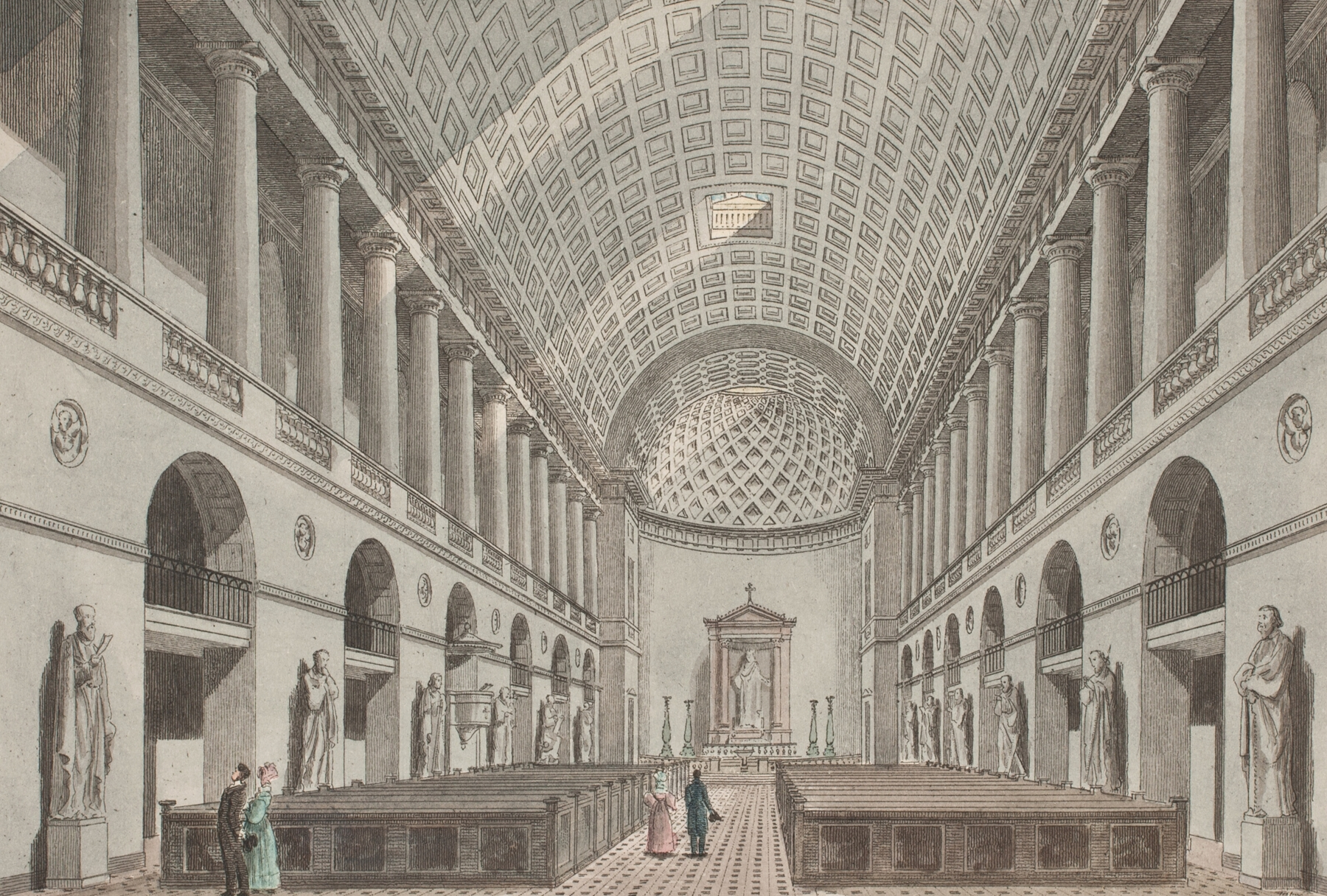
Frue Kirkes Indre
