= N.L. Peschier =

Dutch painter

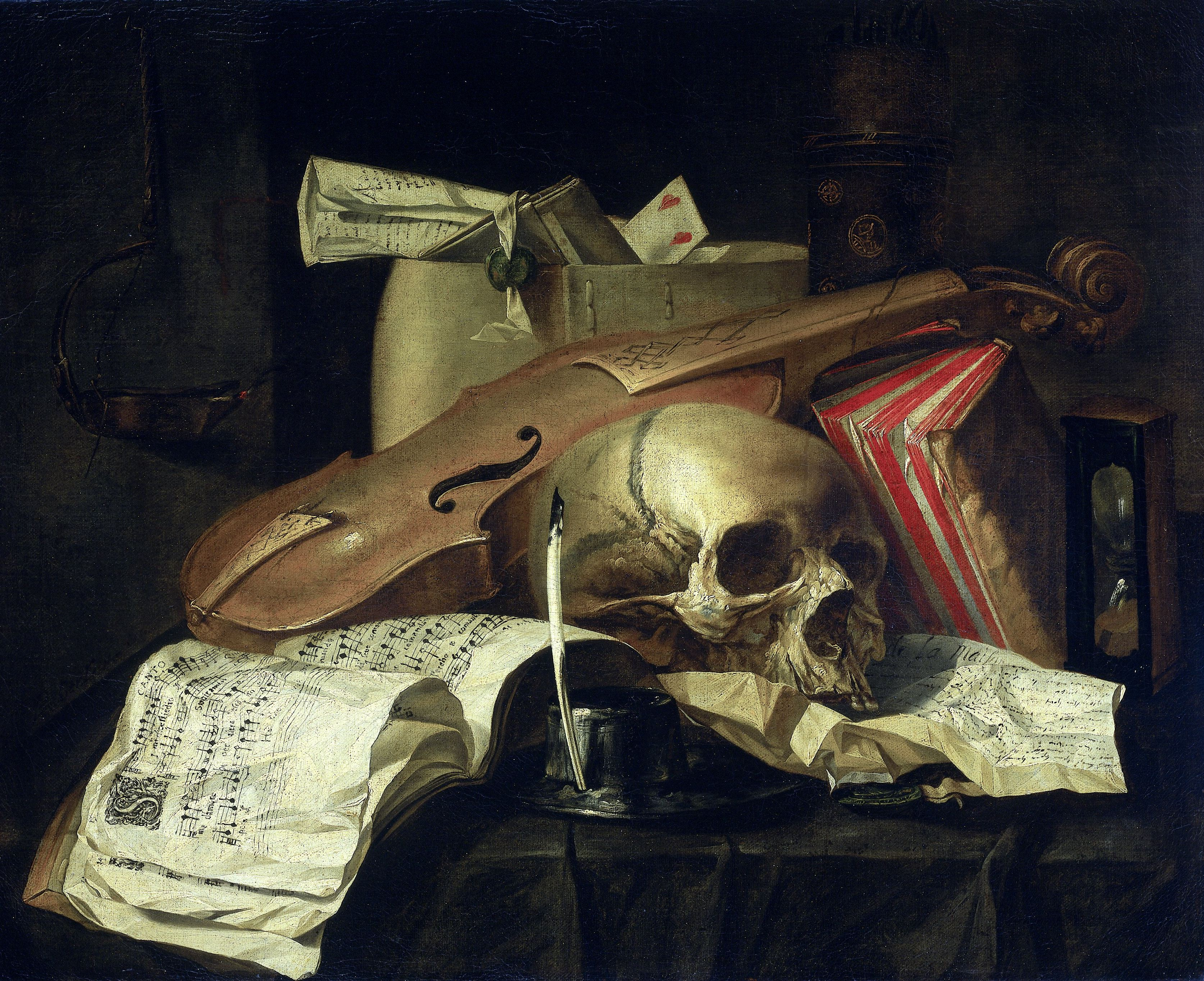
- Vanitas with violin, book, skull, and pen
- Occupation: painter

N.L. Peschier (died after 1661), was a Dutch Golden Age painter.

According to the RKD nothing more is known of him besides his signatures on dated paintings. He influenced David Bailly and is known for vanitas paintings in the manner of Vincent van der Vinne and Edwaert Collier.
