= Peschier House =

Building in Copenhagen, Denmark

- Peschiers Gård
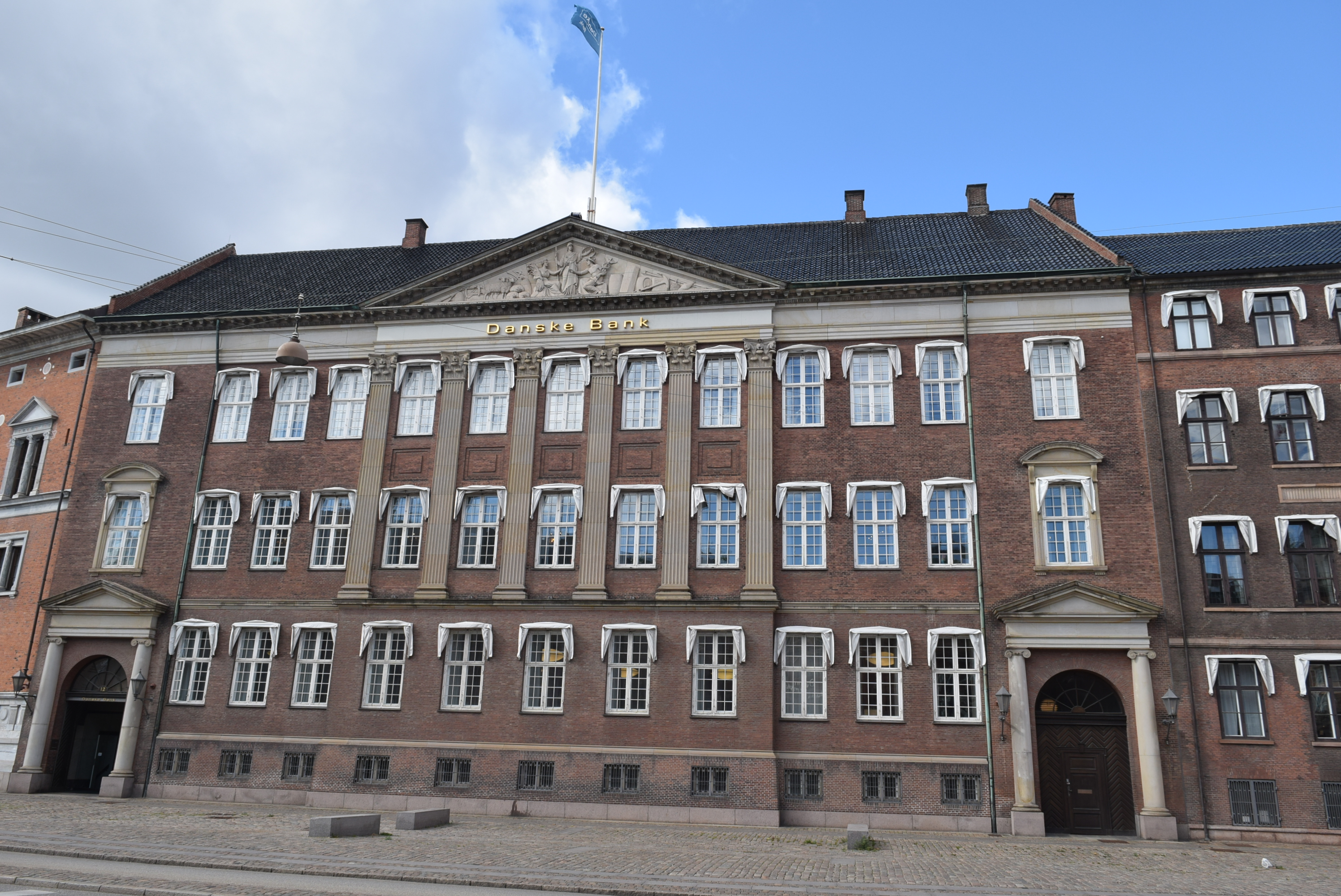
- Interactive map of the Peschier House area

General information
- Location: Copenhagen, Denmark
- Coordinates: 55°40′40.75″N 12°35′7.93″E
- Construction started: 1795
- Completed: 1798
- Client: Pierre Peschier

Design and construction
- Architect: Caspar Frederik Harsdorff

The Peschier House (Danish: Peschiers Gård) is a listed property at Holmens Kanal in the Old Town of Copenhagen, Denmark. The building is currently part of Danske Bank's headquarters but it has been sold to Standard Life and the bank has announced its plans to move to new premises close to Copenhagen Central Station.

== History ==
=== The first building ===
The land along Holmens Canal was sold off in lots by Christian IV in 1647. The property now known as Holmens Kanal 12 was listed in Copenhagen's first cadastre of 1689 as No. 348 in Eastern Quarter, owned by Niels Justsen. The property was listed in the new cadastre of 1756 as No. 400 in Eastern Quarter, owned by captain Paul Koch. Koch served as captain of some of the Danish Asiatic Company's Chinamen.

=== Pierre Peschier's house ===
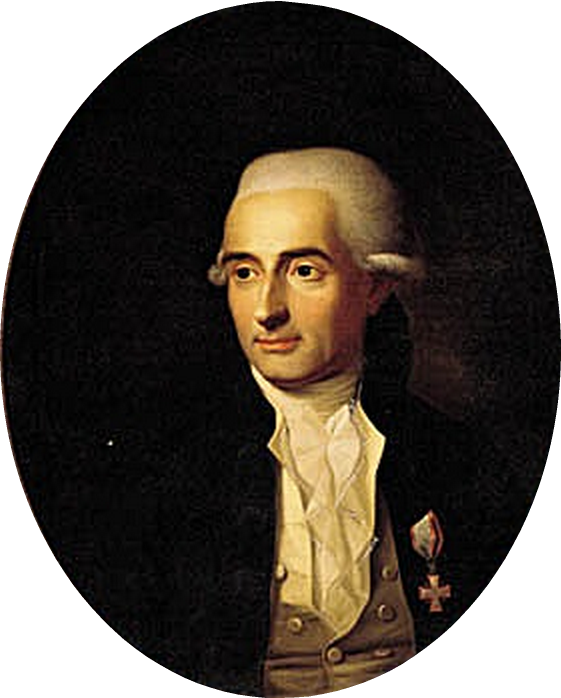
Pierre Peschier

In 1784, it changed hands again when it was acquired by the wealthy merchant Pierre Peschier. He was from Geneva but had come to Denmark in 1768 where he had initially worked for Frédéric de Coninck before starting his own trading house. In the Great Fire of 1795, which began at Gammelholm, Peschier's house was one of the first buildings to be destroyed. Peschier commissioned royal architect Caspar Frederik Harsdorff to design a new house which was completed in 1798. Peschier celebrated the inauguration of his new house with great festivities, attended by members of the royal family. The crisis years of the 1800s, with the British bombardments of Copenhagen in 1801 and 1807, were, however, hard for his business and in 1811 he had to sell his mansion.

=== 1831 to 1872: Changing residents ===
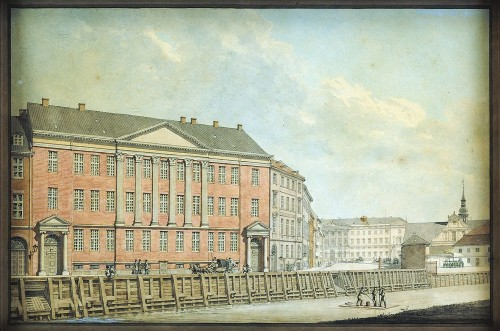
The Peschier House painted by Heinrich Gustav Ferdinand Holm, c. 1851

In 1831, wine trader J. A. Reuter purchased the building. He rented out part of the property to Studenterforeningen (The Student Society). Their premises were inaugurated on Christmas Eve )24 December) 1835 with a prologue by Henrik Hertz. A stage was installed in the great hall. Hans Christian Andersen made an appearance as the tragic actor in his own Souffleurens Benefice at the stage in 1836.

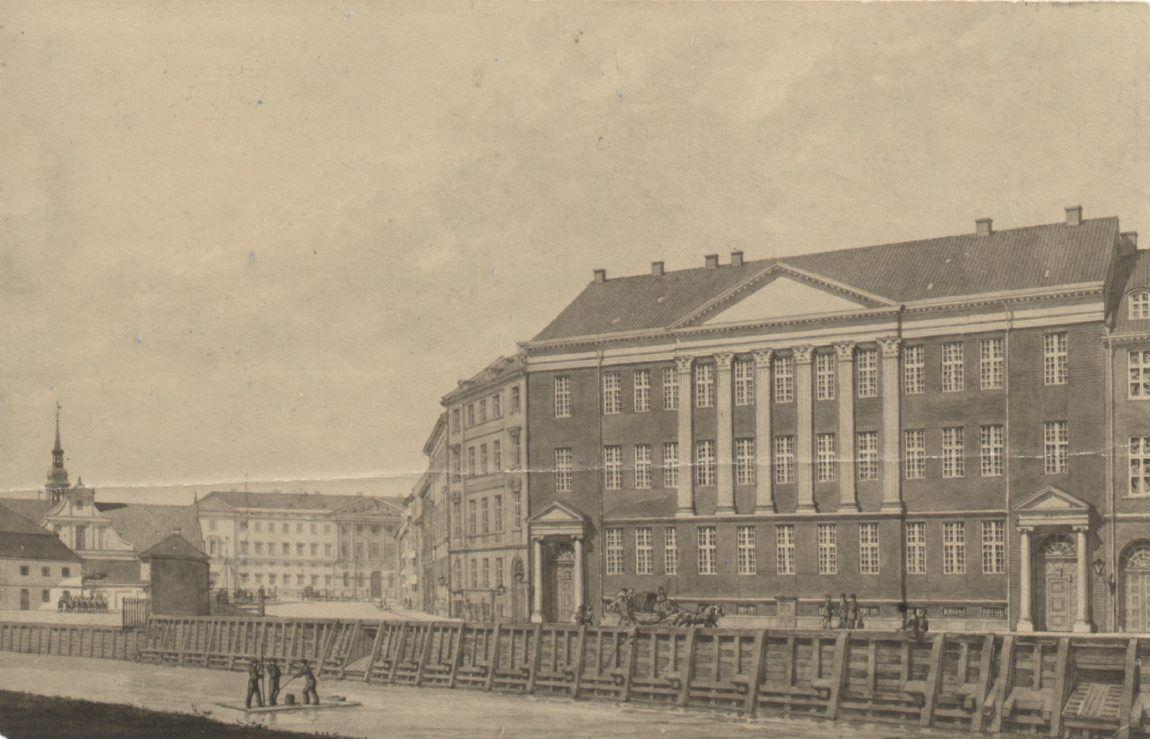
The Peschier House in 18601

A new era began when Christian Hornung took over the Student Society's lease in 1841 when he moved his piano factory to Copenhagen. He was so succesfyl that he could soon take over the ground floor, then the first floor and in 1846 the entire building. In 1850, Hornung commissioned G.F. Hetsch to expand the property with an extra floor in 1850.

In 1853, Association of Industrial Enterprises in Copenhagen (Infustriforeningen I København) took over the building. The second floor was rented out to a dancing school while the basement was taken over by the wine trader Haubro.

=== 1872 to present: Bank building ===
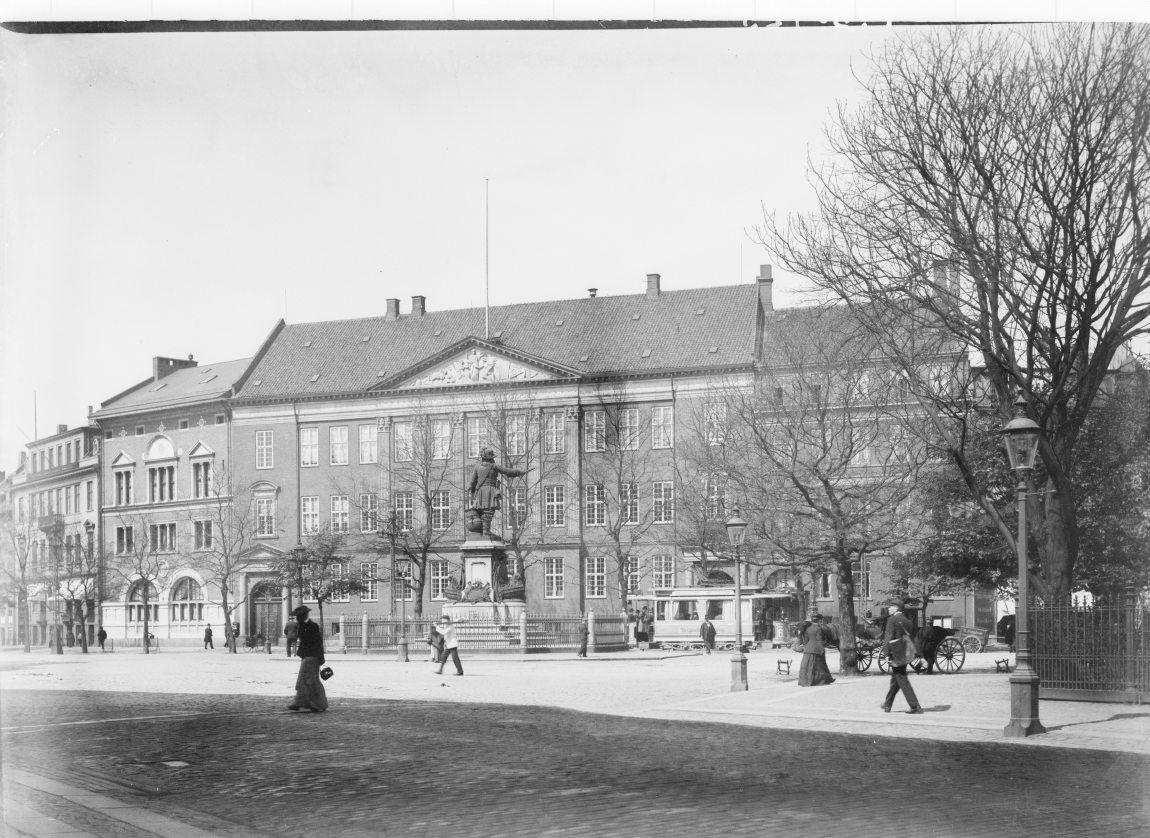
Landmandsbanken, May 1904

The bank Landmandsbanken purchased the building in 1872. An apartment for managing director Isak Glückstadt and his family was created on the second floor. Landmandsbanken later turned into Danske Bank. In March 2015, it was announced that Danske Bank had sold its headquarters to Standard Life for DKK 1.4 billions. Later in 2016, it was announced that Danske Bank has plans to move their headquarters to new premises at the former mail terminal next to Copenhagen Central Station.

== Architecture ==
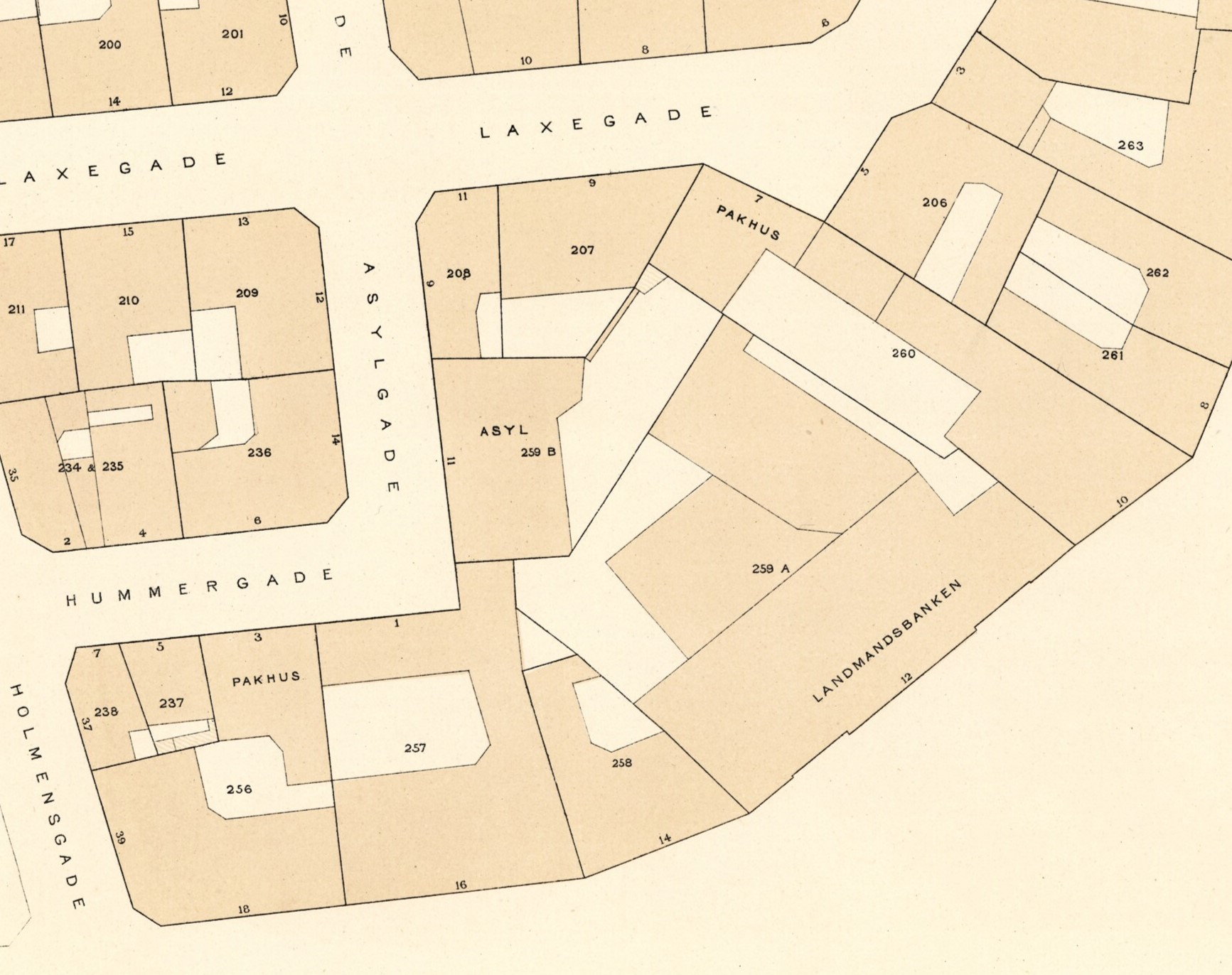
Holmens Kanal 12 seen in a detail from one of Berggreen's block plans of Øster Kvarter in Copenhagen, Denmark.

The original house was in two storeys and 13 bays long. Its central part was decorated with six pilasters and tipped by a triangular pediment. When Hetsch added an extra floor in 1850, he chose to move the pilasters one storey up instead of extending them, and they therefore start at the first floor today. The sculptor Vilhelm Bissen created the relief in the pediment after Landmandbaken's acquisition of the property. It represents the symbols of shipping and farming.

== See also ==
- Erichsen Mansion
