= Pierre Peschier =

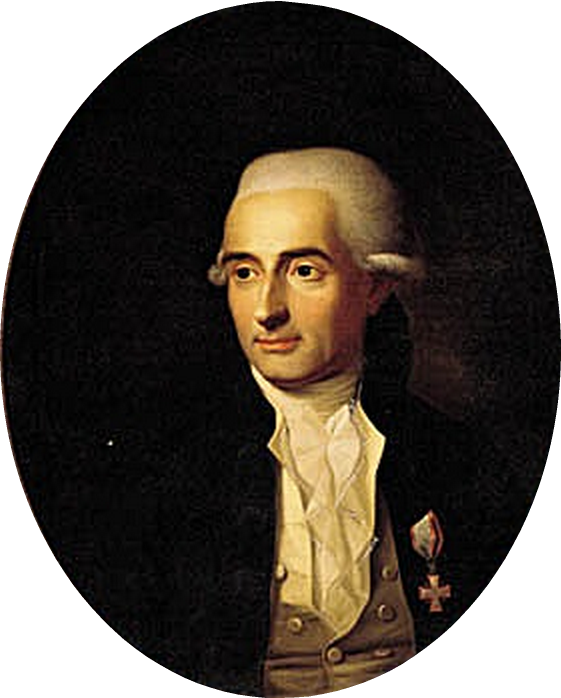
- Pierre Peschier painted by Jens Juel
- Born: 1 November 1739; Geneva, Republic of Geneva
- Died: 16 January 1812 (aged 72); Copenhagen, Denmark
- Occupation: Merchant
- Awards: Order of the Dannebrog

Pierre Peschier (1 November 1739 – 16 January 1812) was a Danish merchant. He founded a successful trading house in Copenhagen in 1768 which later fell victim to the economic crisis of the 1800s and closed in 1815. Peschier's former home at Holmens Kanal in Copenhagen, now known as the Peschier House, is part of Danske Bank's headquarters.

== Early life ==
Peschier was born in Geneva in 1739 to Pierre Peschier and Marguerite Blisson. His father was a pharmacist. He apprenticed as a merchant and working in Portugal, the Netherlands and England in 1765-68 where he achieved a great knowledge of international trade, especially with respect to East Indian colonial goods.

== Successful years in Denmark ==
In 1768, he was called to Denmark by Frédéric de Coninck for whom he worked for some years before establishing his own trading house. He was naturalized in 1776. Peschier mainly traded in grain but was also very active in trade with colonial goods from East India on the Russian market. He was considered Asiatic Company's best customer. He generated average sales of DKK 2 million during his best years but twice had to apply for court receivership due to the baldness with which he managed his affairs. His quick come back were no doubt partly due to support from the state. He had close ties to finance minister Ernst von Schimmelmann who provided him with advance payments in return for his advice to the government.

== Crisis years and death ==
From 1799, Denmark experienced a period of economic crisis which hit Peschier's trading house hard but he was helped adverse times by credits from Bankkontoret. In 1804, the ties between the state and Peschier's trading house became even closer and both his nephew Agier Wexelsen from Bankkontoret were made partners in the company. Peschier's influence in the company dwindled and it was from then on de facto operated by the state. For a few years the company managed to generate reasonable profits but from 1807 times worsened. The company responded by moving into large-scale trade with timber from Norway but only the state profited from it. The grocer Lauritz Nicolai Hvidt was unsuccessful in his efforts to help the company in 1810.

Peschier died a poor man in 1812. His companies were liquidized by a commission established in 1815.

Hvidt practically considered the enterprise a scam but the involvement of the state moderated his reactions. Many forest owners had come in deep debt by trading with it.

== Personal life ==
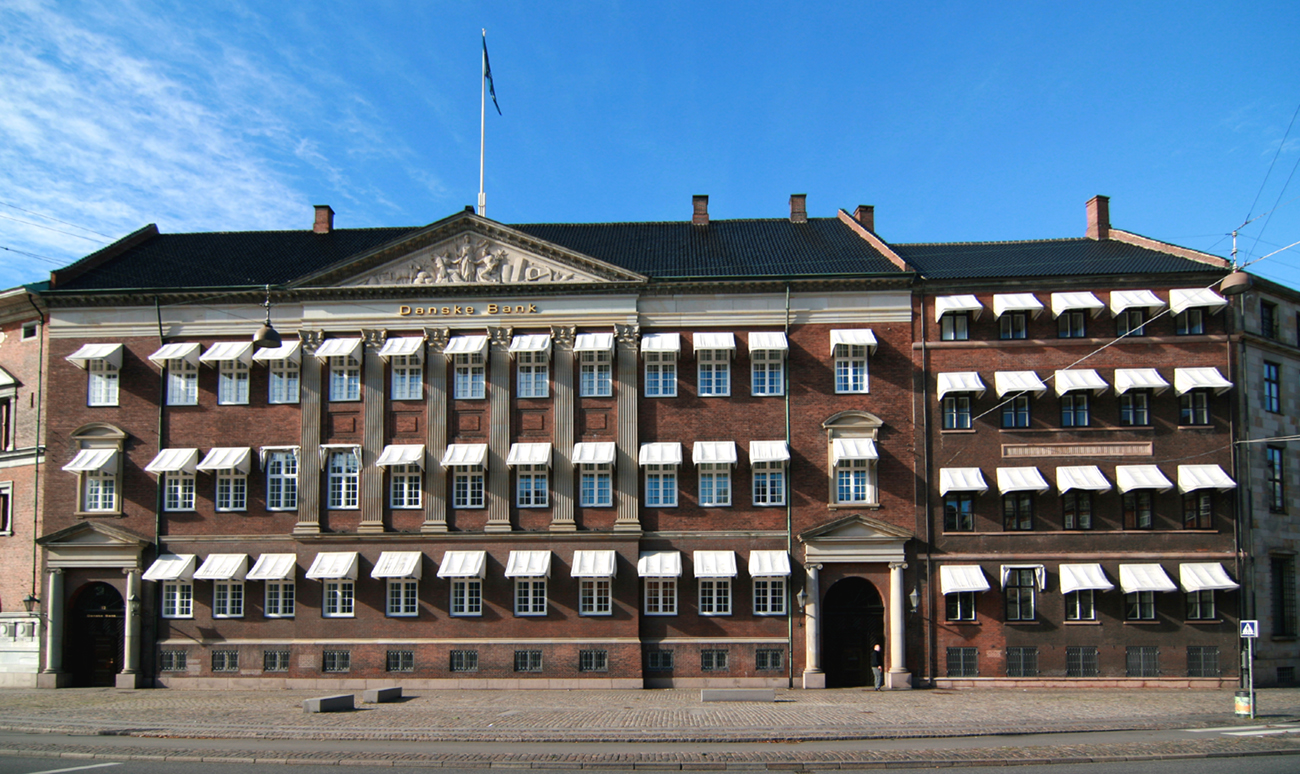
The Peschier House today

On 15 October 1784, Peschier married Marie Susanne Grodtschilling (baptized 14 September 1762 in Copenhagen - died 18 October 1816), daughter of captain-lieutenant and later counter admiral Frederik G. (1731–92) and Suzanna Marie Prescher (1744–68). Peschier became a Knight of the Order of the Dannebrog in 1809.
