= Peter Rabe Holm =

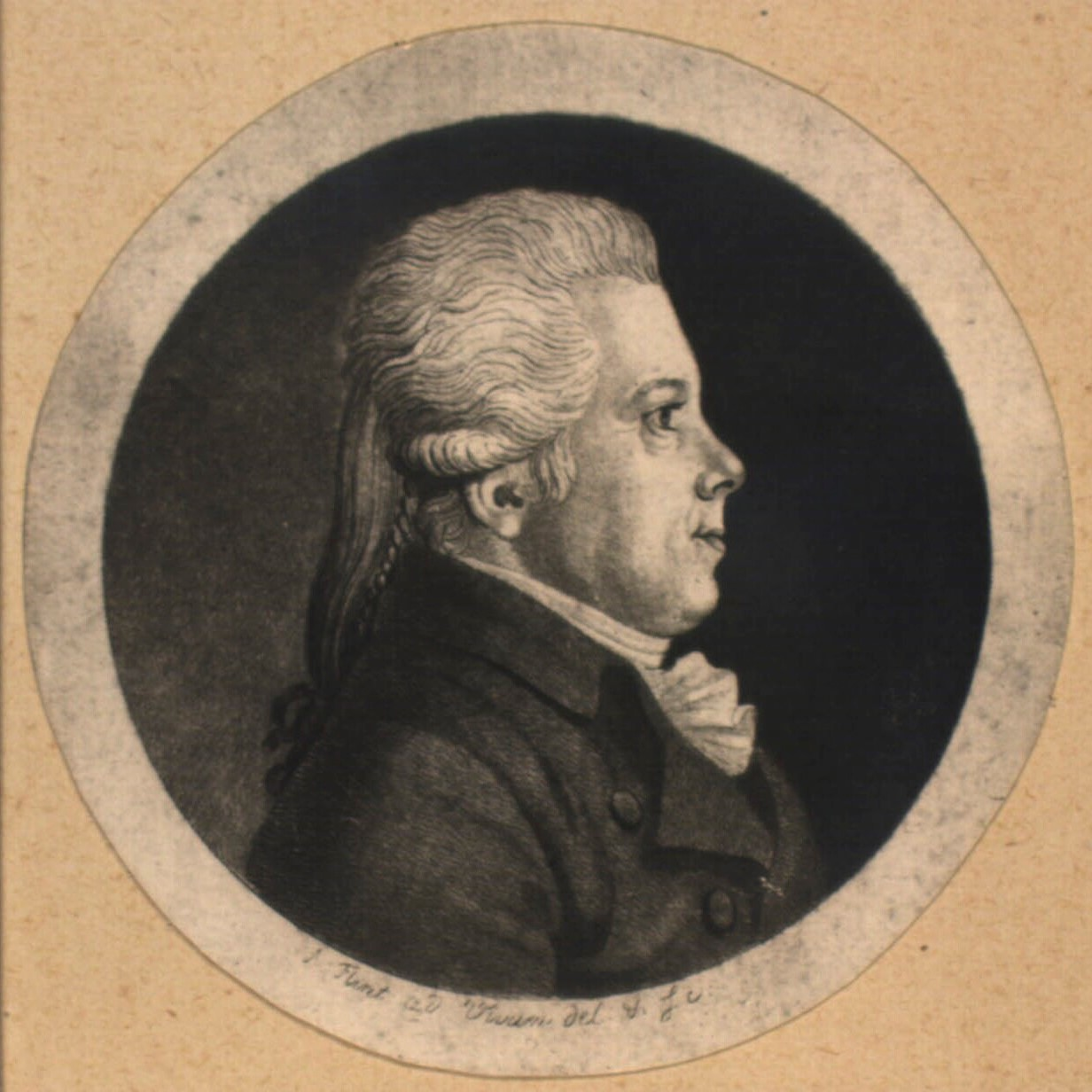
Peter Rabeholm

Peter Rabe Holm (Rabe-Holm, Rabeholm; 1751–1824) was a Danish wine merchant, brewer and director of the Danish Asiatic Company.

== Early life ==
Rabeholm was born in Copenhagen, the son of Jens Pedersen Holm and Anne Kirstine Mogensdatter Rabe. The family lived in the Christianshavn district of Copenhagen] His brother Christian was a ship captain in the service of the Danish Asiatic Company.

== Career ==
Rabeholm acquired citizenship as a wine merchant in Copenhagen. In 1779, Holm acquired the Cort Adeler House on Strandgade from Søren Lycke. He also owned a windmill in Enhjørningens Bastion as well as a small beer brewery on an adjacent site. The brewery would still be known as Rabeshave Brewery (Rabe's Garden) long after his death. He was a shareholder in the Danish Asiatic Company and for a while served as one of the directors of the company. Ge also served as director of Kjøbenhavns Brandforsikring. He was awarded the title of Councillor of Commerce (Kommerceråd). In 1800, he was a board member of Speciesbanken.

== Personal life ==
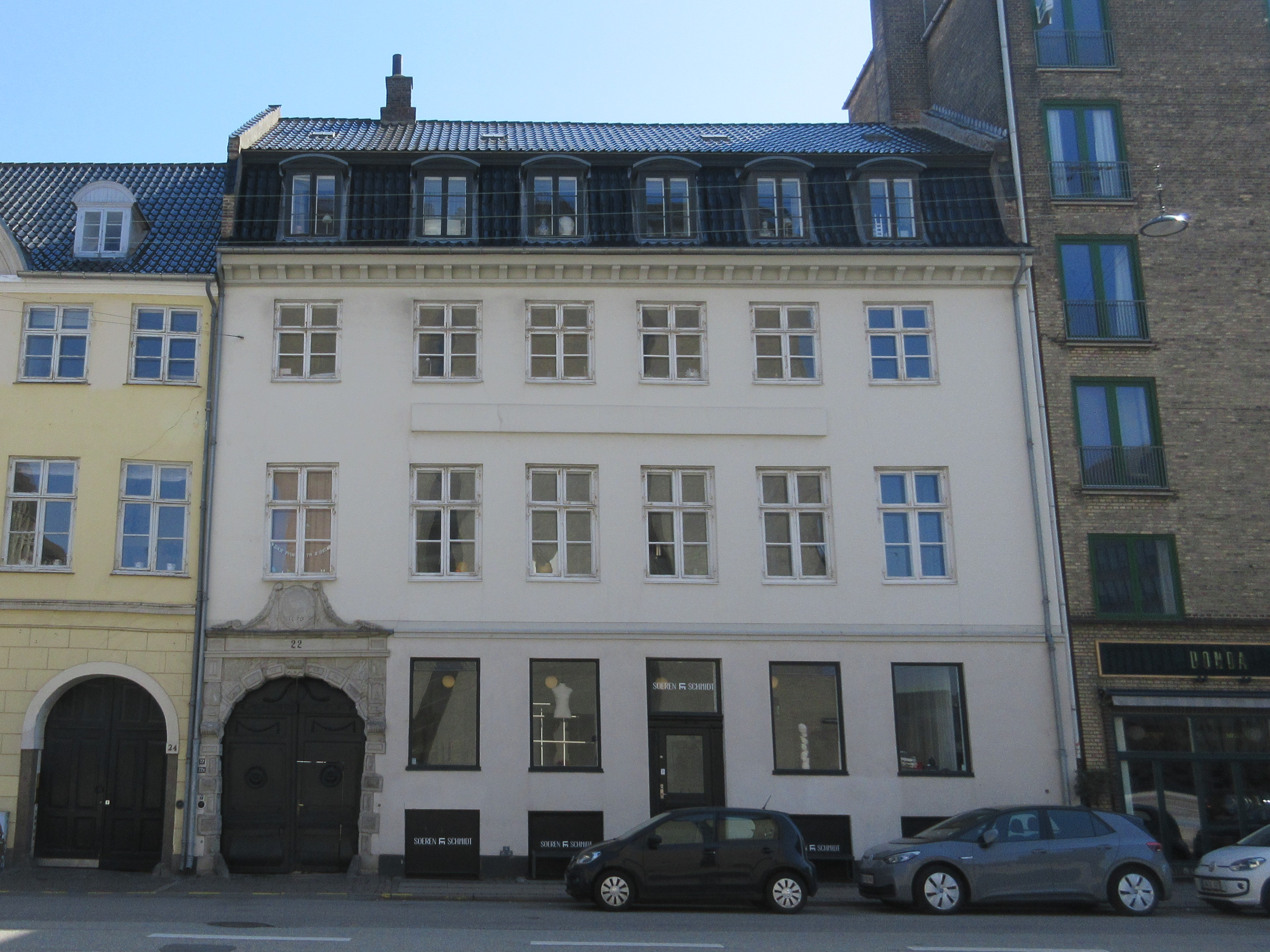
Rabe-Holm's former building at Strandgade 22 in Cgristianshavn.

Rabeholm was married two times, first to Anna Maria Hännel and then to Karen Langemach.

Rabe-Golm's property in Strandgade was home to 24 residents in two households at the 1787 census. Rabe Holm resided in the building with his wife Anna Maria Hännel, their seven children (aged one to nine), his bookkeeper Jens Adrian Leth, two clerks, a caretaker, two maids and a wet nurse. Peder Ramshart, a naval officer with rank of commander captain, resided in the other apartment with his wife Frideriche Schmidt, their three children (aged two to seven) and three maids. In 1798, Thomas Potter took over one of the apartments. His iron foundry was at this point located in Sofiegade. He lived in the apartment until 1807. He had previously lived in the Potter House overlooking Christianshavn Canal.
