= Overgaden Oven Vandet 8 =

Listed building in Copenhagen

Overgaden Oven Vamdet 8
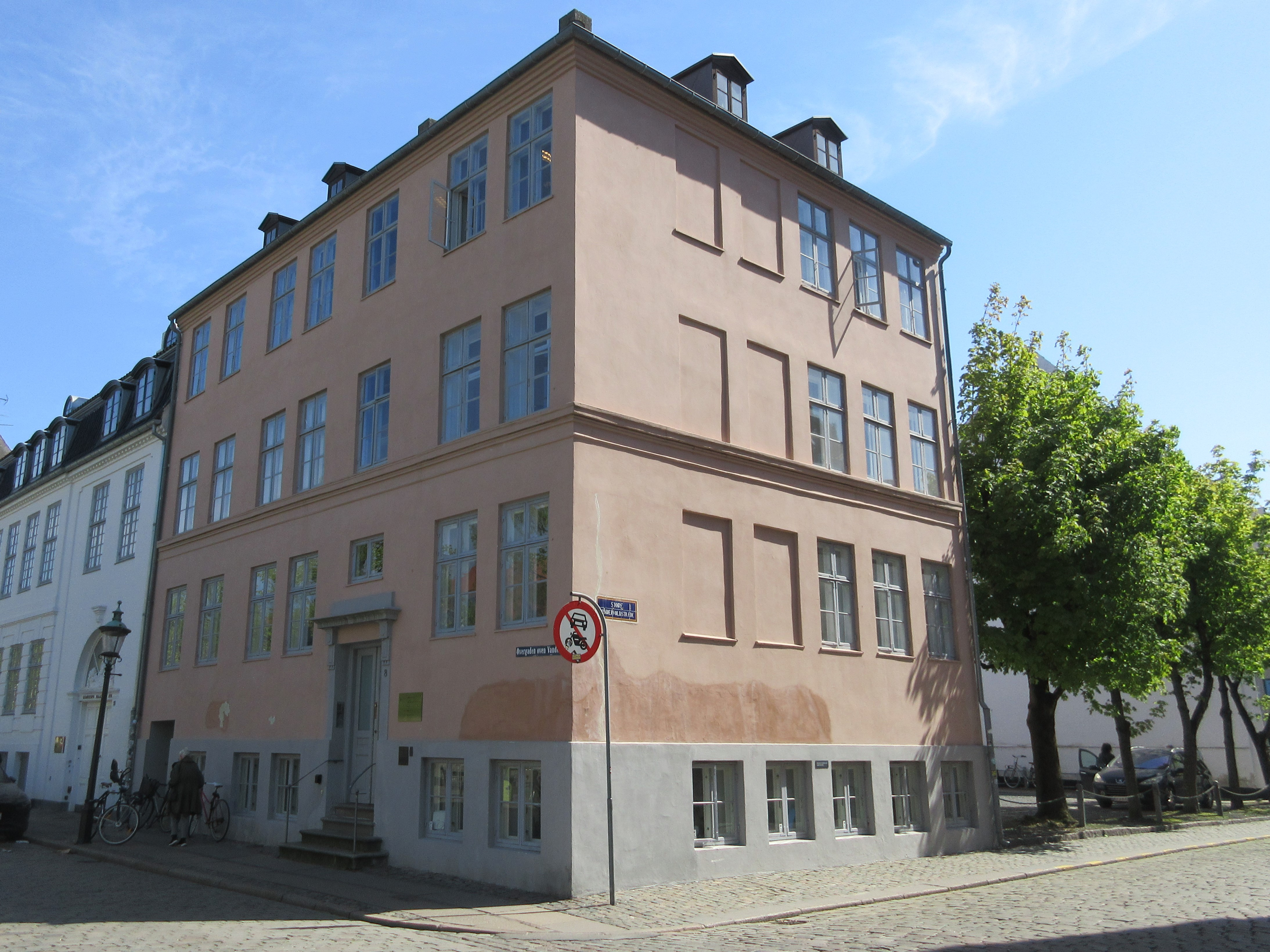

General information
- Architectural style: J. D. Backhausen
- Location: Copenhagen
- Country: Denmark
- Coordinates: 55°40′14.59″N 12°35′18.56″E
- Completed: c. 1650
- Inaugurated: 1786 (heightened), 1800 (facade)

Overgaden Oven Vamdet 8 is an 18th-century building overlooking Christianshavn Canal in the Christianshavn neighbourhood of central Copenhagen, Denmark. It originates in a two-storey, Neoclassical building constructed in 1786 by Andreas Kirkerup for candle maker Christian From. This building was heightened with one storey in 1831. It was listed in the Danish registry of protected buildings and places in 1945. Notable former residents include organist and composer Niels Peter Hillebrandt.

== History ==
=== Site history, 1756–1785 ===
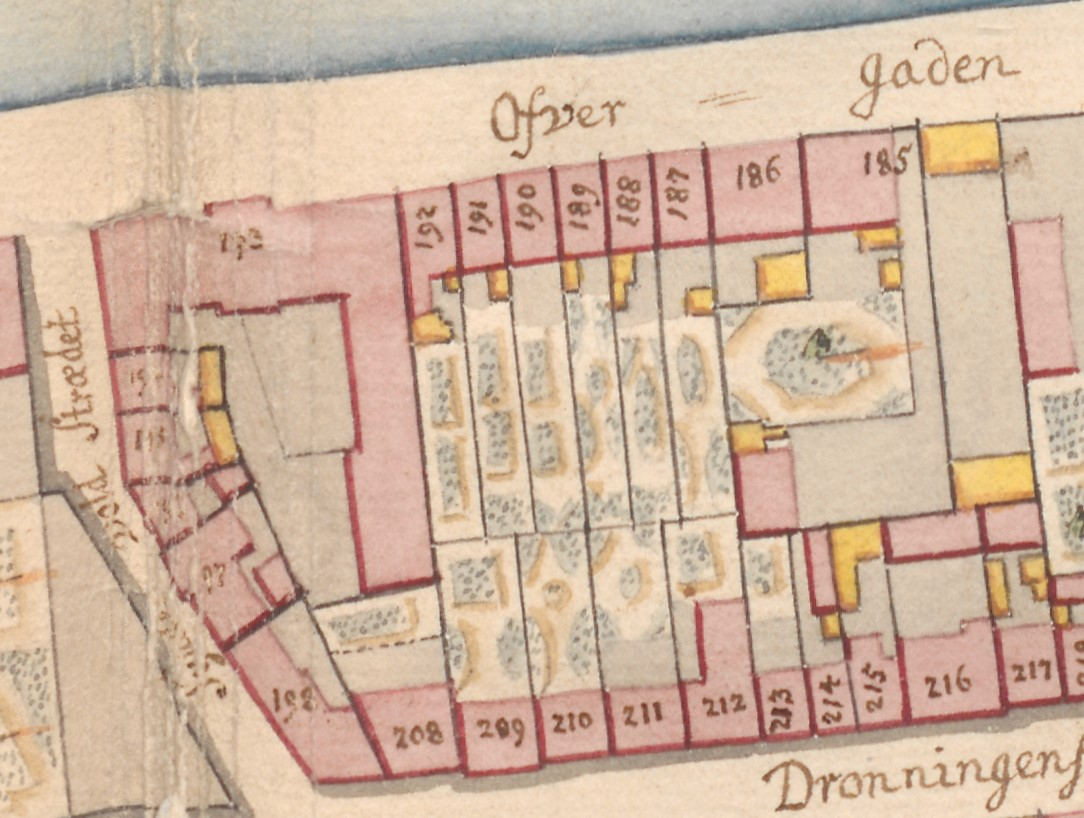
No. 193 seen on a detail from Christian Gedde's map of Christianshavn Quarter, 1757.

The site was formerly part of the same property as the adjacent Potter House. This large corner property was listed in the new cadastre of 1756 as No. 193 in Christianshavn Quarter. It was at that time the site of a clay pipe factory managed by overkrigskommissær Alexander Walker Roos and Jonas Collin. A residential building faced the canal. The pipe factory was located in a secondary wing which extended from the rear side of the building along the northeastern side of the central courtyard. The corner with Søndervoldgade was the site of a half-timbered oats mill.

The property was acquired by Thomas Potter in 1779.

=== Christian From and the new building ===
In June 1786, Potter sold the corner site as No. 193B to candle maker Christian Wilhelm Johansen From (1745–1805). He was already the owner of the house at Store Grønnegade No. 232 (owner 1785–87). In 1898, From charged Abdreas Kirkerup with the construction of a two-storey house on the site. The building had a quadratic footprint, with six bays towards both streets. The facade towards the canal was tipped by a triangular pediment.

No. 193B was home to two households at the 1787 census. Christian Friderich Lund, superintendent of the Royal Naval Dockyard's dry dock in Strandgade, resided in the building with his four children (aged 10 to 19) and one maid. Johan Jacob Lund, a commanding sargeant, resided in the building with his wife Johanne Cathrine Friderice (née Møller), their three-year-old foster daughter, Johanne Marie Fridr. Gladix, one maid and two lodgers.

In 1789, From sold the property. He later worked as a ship's cook for the Danish Asiatic Company. He died in Serampore in 1805.

=== Abo Jensen and Nielsen ===
In 1789, From sold this property to captain lieutenant Tøger Abo. By deed of 17 January 1797, Abo sold the property to grocer (urtekræmmer) Jens Nielsen. Nielsen died shortly thereafter. His widow Mette Cathrine Jensdatter was subsequently married to grocer (høker) Søren Jensen.

Their property was home to four households at the 1801 census. Jensen and his wife lived in the building with his 88-year-old mother and two maids. Holger Scheel Gyldenfeldt (1817-1864), a captain in the Royal Danish Navy, was also a resident in the building. Hans Hansen Schmidt, a barkeeper, resided in the basement with his wife and their nine children. Peter Rasmussen, a workman, resided in the basement with his wife and three lodgers (a workman and two soldiers).

In 1802, Søren Jensen also bought No. 194 from Kirkerup. The old No. 193 B was listed in the new cadastre of 1806 as No. 109. It was at that time still owned by Søren Jensen.

=== 1830–1900 ===
The building was heightened with one storey in 1831. The building was listed as Overgaden Oven Vandet 8 when house numbering was introduced as a supplement to the old cadastral numbers by quarter in 1859.

The property was home to 24 residents at the 1860 census. Hanne Bergitte Lund, widow of a kancelliråd, resided on the ground floor with two unmarried daughters (age 48 and 49 and one lodger. Jacob Beierholm Wenzel (1808–1869), a master carpenter and lieutenant in Copenhagen Fire Corps, resided on the first floor with his wife Ellen Katrine (née Rasmussen), two daughters (aged 19 and 21) and his niece Emma Lydia Caroline Jessen. Niels Peter Hillebrandt, cantor and bell-ringer at Christian's Church, resided on the second floor with his wife Sophie Charlotte Hillebrandt (née Møller), their four children (aged 10 to 22) and one maid. Anders Jensen, a grocer (høker), resided in the basement with his wife Johanne Henriette Jensen (née Christensen), their three children (aged two to nine), one maid and two lodgers.

The property was home to 23 residents at the 1880 census. Nielsine Cecilie Dohn, a widow, resided on the ground floor with three children (aged 15 to 27), one maid and 14-year-old Peter Alfred Lindenberg (pupil in Borgerdyd School).Otto Emil Hansen, a manager (forvalter), resided on the first floor with his wife Rasmine Hansine Hansen, their four children (aged one to seven) and one maid. Niels Mogensen, a mechanic, resided on the second floor with his wife Marie Vilhelmine Emilie Mogensen, their one-year-old son and one maid. Maren Christiansen and Kirstine Carlsen, two factory workers, resided in the garret. Anna Sophie Schrøder, a widow grocer, resided in the basement with her two children (aged nine and 14) and 26-year-old Thora Amalie Frisch.

=== 20th century ===
The architect Alf Thomsen was responsible for undertaking a comprehensive renovation of the building in 1909–10. The building was listed in the Danish registry of protected buildings and places in 1945. In the early 1980s, Dournais Regnestue was responsible for undertaking another refurbishment of the building. The building was again refurbished in 1999.

In the 1950s the building was owned by Ulf Brøste who also owned the Potter House next door. One of his shops occupied the basement. It was later moved to the corner of Overganden Neden Vandet and Torvegade.

== Architecture ==
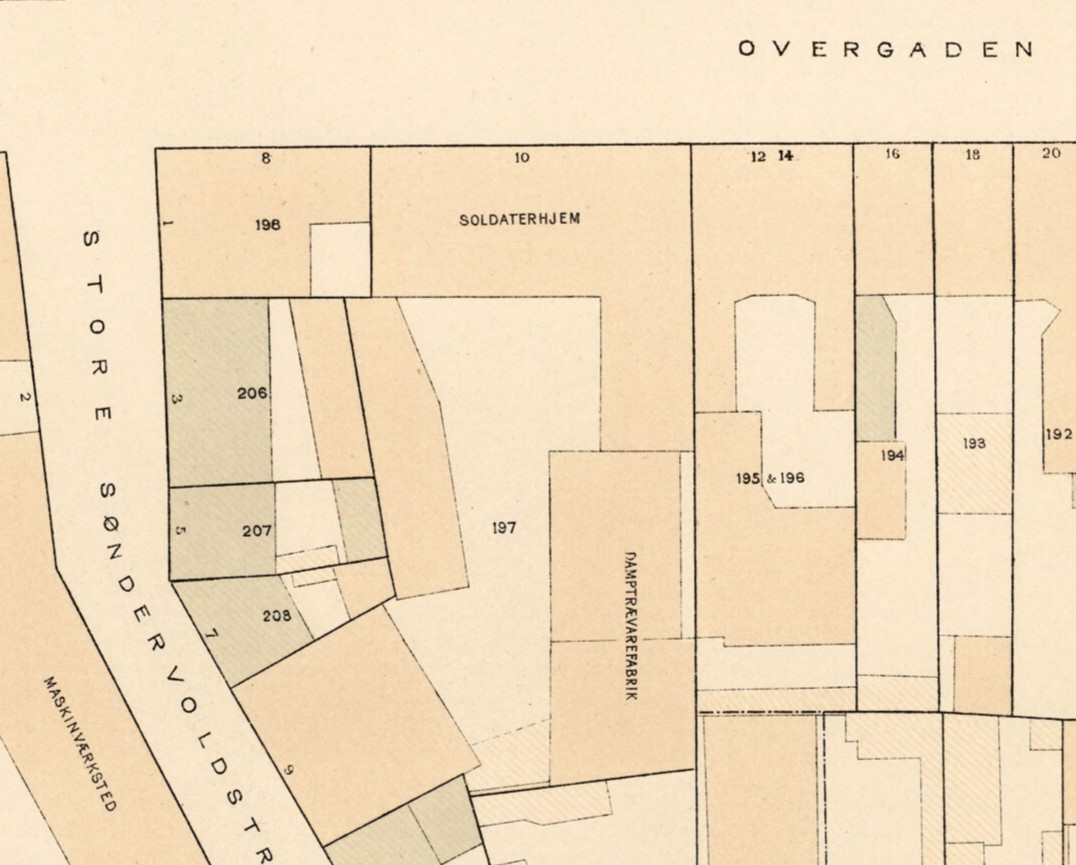
Overgaden Oven Vandet 8 seen on a detail from one of Berggreen's block plans of Christianshavn, 1886-88. "Soldaterhjemmet" is the Potter House.

Kirkerup's building from 1786 was constructed with two storeys over a walk-out basement. The building had a quadratic footprint with a six bays long principal facade crowned by a triangular pediment towards the canal and a six bays long secondary facade towards Søndervoldstræde. A gateway wing, two bays wide and half as deep as the corner building, connected the building to the Potter House. The triangular pediment disappeared when the building was heightened with one storey in 1831. The gateway was removed by Alf Thomsen in 1909-1910. The building's principal staircase was also moved at this point. The number of windows towards the canal was reduced from six to five. One of the six bays towards Søndervoldstræde is without window and the two adjacent windows have been bricked up, leaving the building with three windows towards that street. The roof is clad with red tiles.

== Today ==
As of 2008, Overgaden Oven Vandet 8 belonged to C. W. Obel Ejendomme. On 1 July 2012, Jeudan acquired Overgaden Oven Vandet 8–12 as part of a portfolio of seven historic properties. The price for the seven properties was DKK 349 million.
