= Cort Adeler House =

Historic property in Copenhagen, Denmark

- Cort Adelers Gård
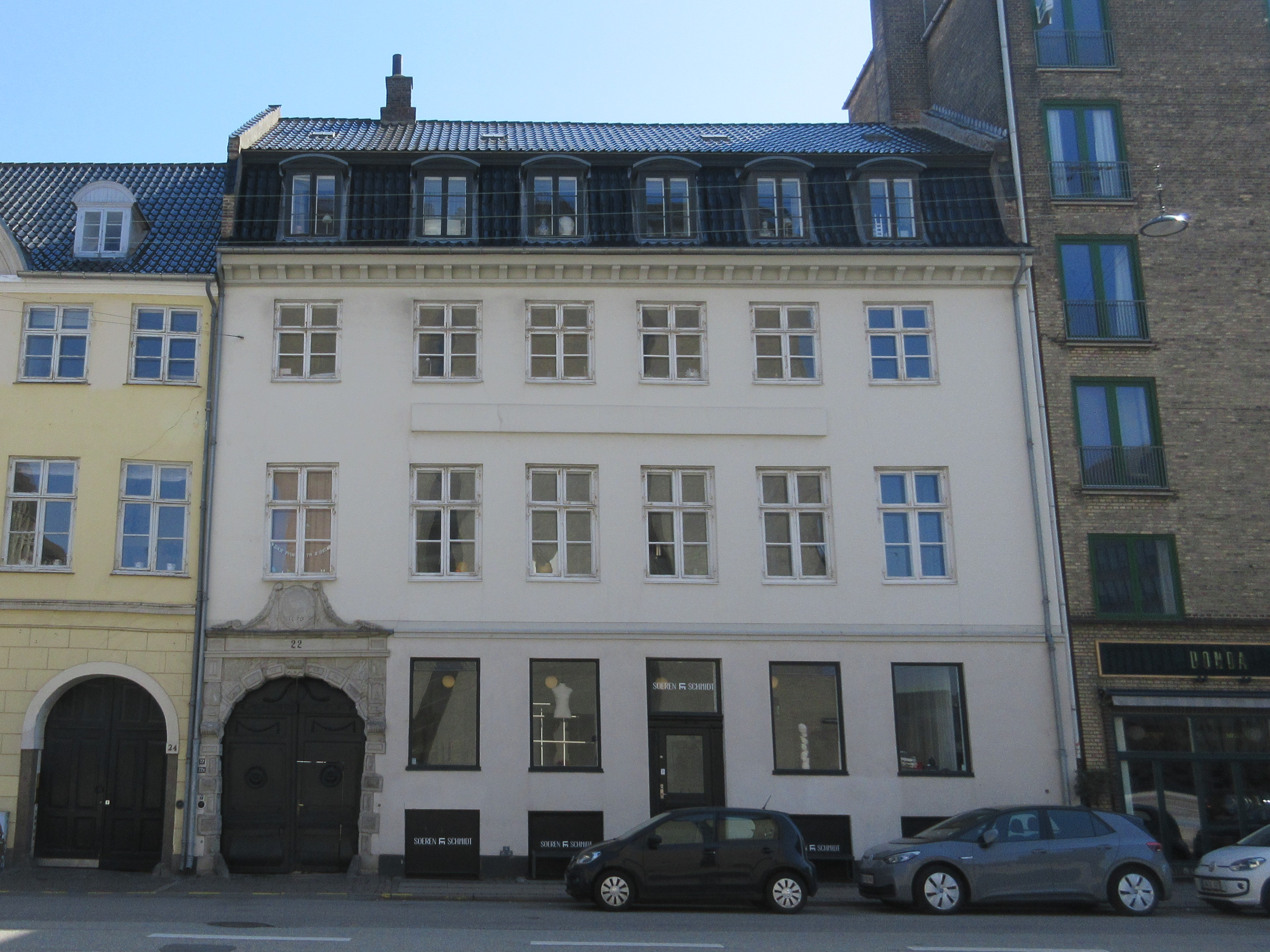
- The Cort Adeler House viewed from across the street
- Interactive map of the Cort Adeler House area

General information
- Location: Copenhagen, Denmark
- Coordinates: 55°40′25.64″N 12°35′22.88″E
- Completed: c. 1630
- Client: Jens Sparre

The Cort Adeler House is a historic property located at Strandgade 22 in the Christianshavn neighbourhood of Copenhagen, Denmark. It takes its name from Admiral Cort Adeler, who lived there for the last seven years of his life in the 17th century.

== History ==
=== 17th century ===
The house was constructed in around 1630 for Count Jens Sparre. It was later acquired by Admiral Cort Adeler. He undertook a comprehensive renovation of the building.

The property was listed as No. 18 in Christianshavn Quarter in Copenhagen's first cadastre of 1689. It was at that time still owned by Adler's heirs.

=== Changing owners, 1700–1890 ===
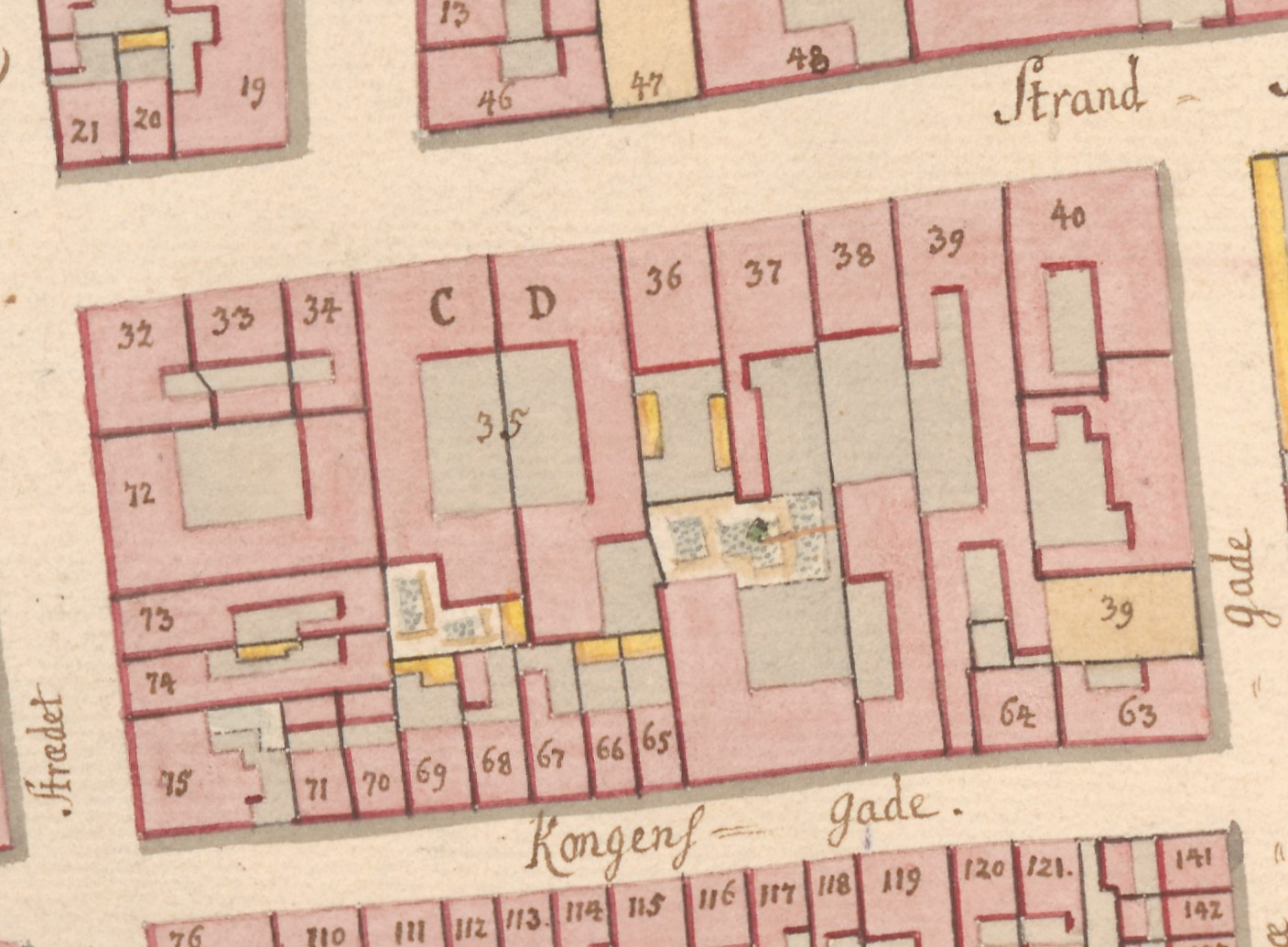
No. 35 seen in a detail from Christian Gedde's map of Christianshavn Quarter, 1757

The property was listed as No. 35 in the new cadastre of 1756. It was at that time owned by Johan Frederik Becker.

The property was briefly, in 1764–65, owned by tobacco manufacturer Robert Ogilvi. In 1770–1780, it belonged to the wholesaler Søren Lycke (Severin Lücke). He served as one of the directors of the Danish Asiatic Company.

=== Rabe Holm family ===
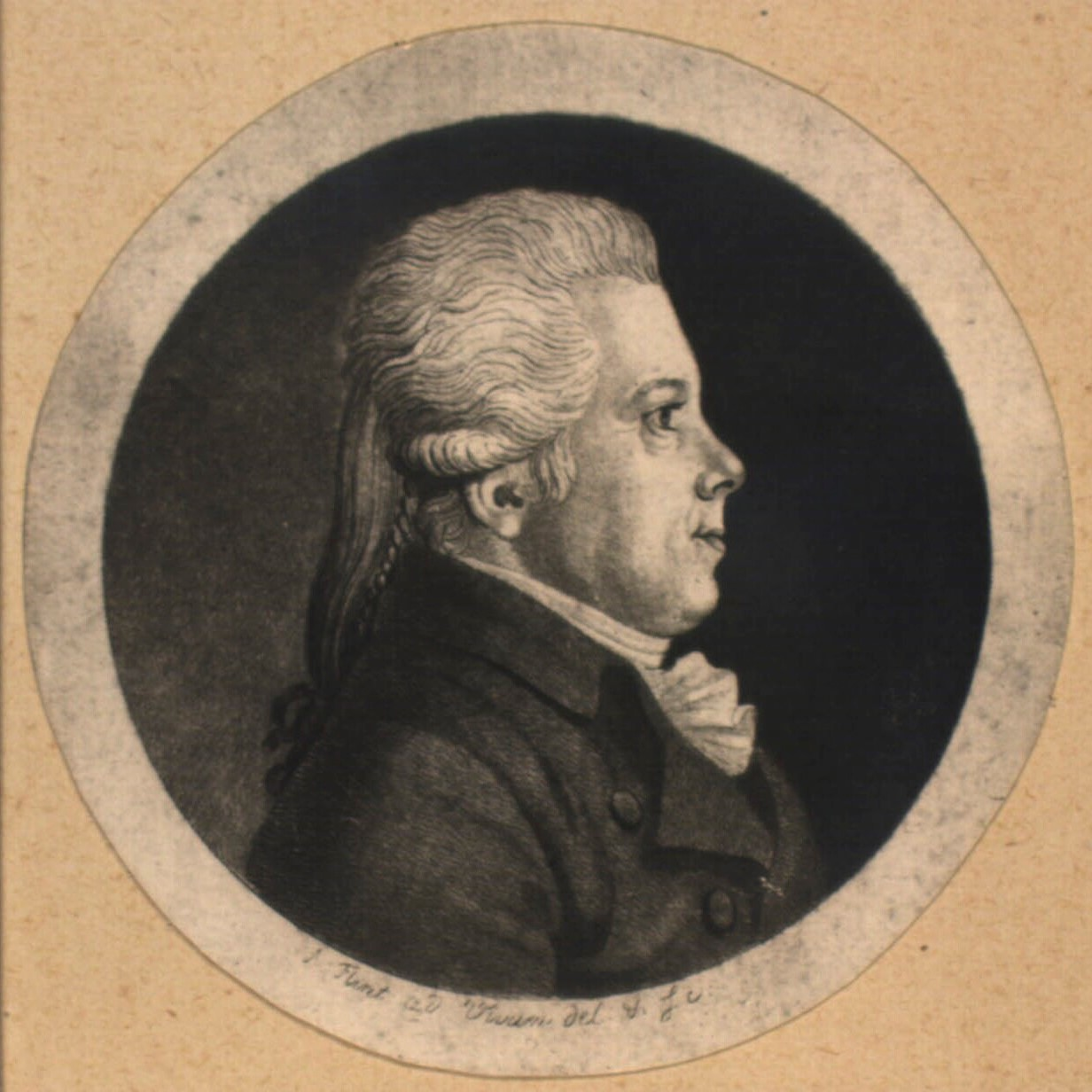
Peter Rabeholm

In 1779, Lycke sold the property to merchant (grosserer) Peter Rabe Holm (1751–1838). His property was home to 24 residents in two households at the 1787 census. Rabe Holm resided in the building with his wife Anna Maria Hännel, their seven children (aged one to nine), his bookkeeper Jens Adrian Leth, two clerks, a caretaker, two maids and a wet nurse. Peder Ramshart, a naval officer with rank of commander captain, resided in the other apartment with his wife Frideriche Schmidt, their three children (aged two to seven) and three maids.

In 1798, Thomas Potter took over one of the apartments. His iron foundry was at this point located in Sofiegade. He lived in the apartment until 1807. He had previously lived in the Potter House overlooking Christianshavn Canal.

The property was home to 20 residents in three households at the 1801 census. Peter Rabeholm resided in the building with his second wife Kasse Konsberg, five of their children from his first marriage, a clerk, a caretaker, two maids and the lieutenant Friderich E. Koefod Dorscheus. Thomas Potter resided in the building with his wife, their two children (aged one and two), a wet nurse and two maids. Richart Juel, a grocer (spækhøker), resided in the building with his wife Cathrine Dreyer and one maid.

Rabe Holm's property was listed as No. 47 in the new cadastre of 1806.

=== Later history ===
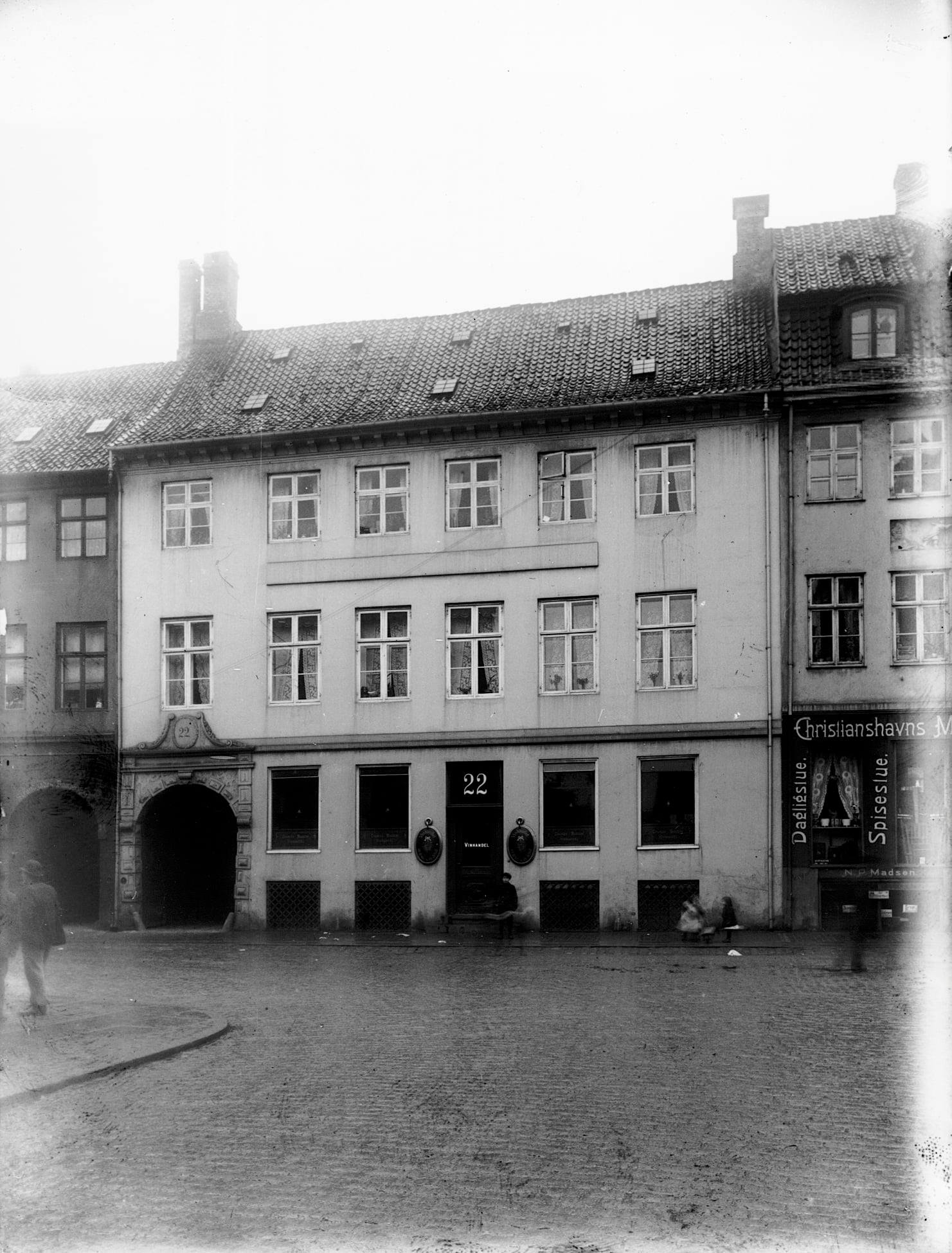
The Cort Adeler House

The priest and philanthropist Carl Johan Visby (1801–1871) was a resident in the building from 1831 until 1844. The military officer N. C. Lunding (1795–1871) had his home in the building from 1835 until 1842. He would later command the Danish troops in Fredericia in the war against Germany in 1848. The zoologist H. N. Krøyer (1799–1870) lived in the building from 1840 to 1842.

The property was home to 36 residents in seven households at the 1850 census. Jens Petersen, a merchant (grosserer), resided on the ground floor with his employee Stine Hansen. Johan Jacobsen, another merchant, resided on the first floor with his wife Dorthea Windigg, their two children (aged five and seven), an 18-year-old lodger and three maids. Ertman Peter Bonnesen, a master shipbuilder, resided on the second floor with his wife Claudine Bonnesen, their four children (aged four to 13), two sisters-in-law and one maid. Gotlieb Fackmann, a shoemaker, resided on the ground floor of the rear wing with his wife Bolette Fackmann, their one-year-old daughter and two maids. C. F. Kattenlit, a metalworker, resided on the ground floor of the side wing with his wife Inge Marie Kattenlit, two unmarried daughters (aged 23 and 32) and one lodger. Eduard Meillerup, a master painter, resided on the second floor of the side wing with his wife Julie Hansine Meillerup, their one-year-old daughter and one maid. Bolette Jacobsen, a widow, resided on the second floor of the rear wing with her two daughters (aged 20 and 23).

== Architecture ==
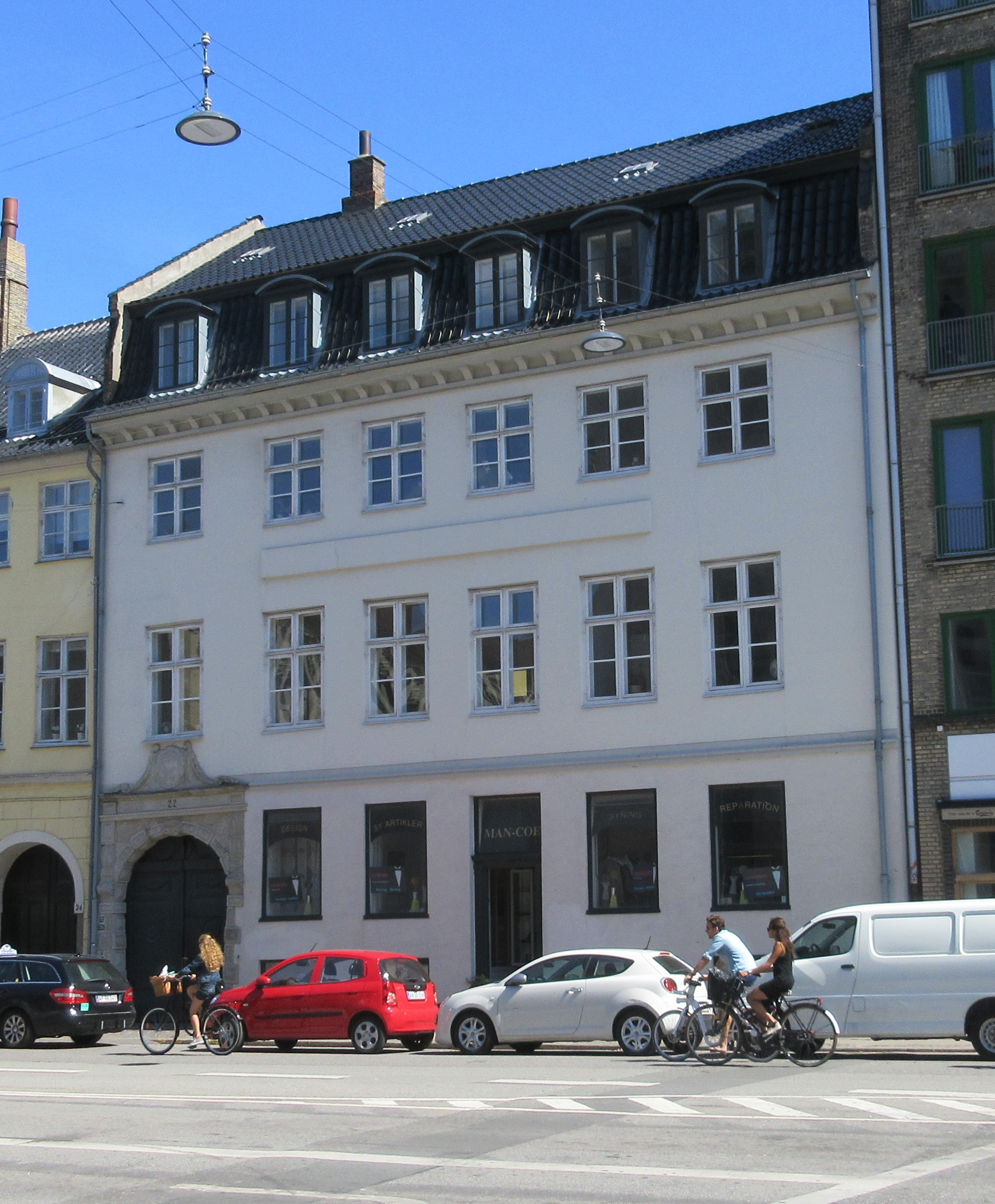
The building, viewed from across the street

The house was originally a two-storey building. It was extended with an extra floor in 1770 by the merchant Søren Lyche, who then owned it. The mansard roof dates from an adaption in 1927.

The building at No. 24 was part of the property until 1743. The houses were then both two stories high and six bays long.

The side wing dates from the 17th century and was probably built at the same time as the building facing the street. It was originally two stories high, but was adapted in 1943. A rear wing attached to the side wing is from 1933. It is five bays wide and four floors tall, and has a mansard roof.

On the wall in the courtyard is a white marble plaque with an inscription in gilded lettering stating that Cort Adeler lived in the building from 1768 to 1775.

== Today ==
The designer Søren Le Schmidt occupies the ground floor of the building.
