= Alexander Walker Ross =

Danish Military Prosecutor General and General War Commissioner

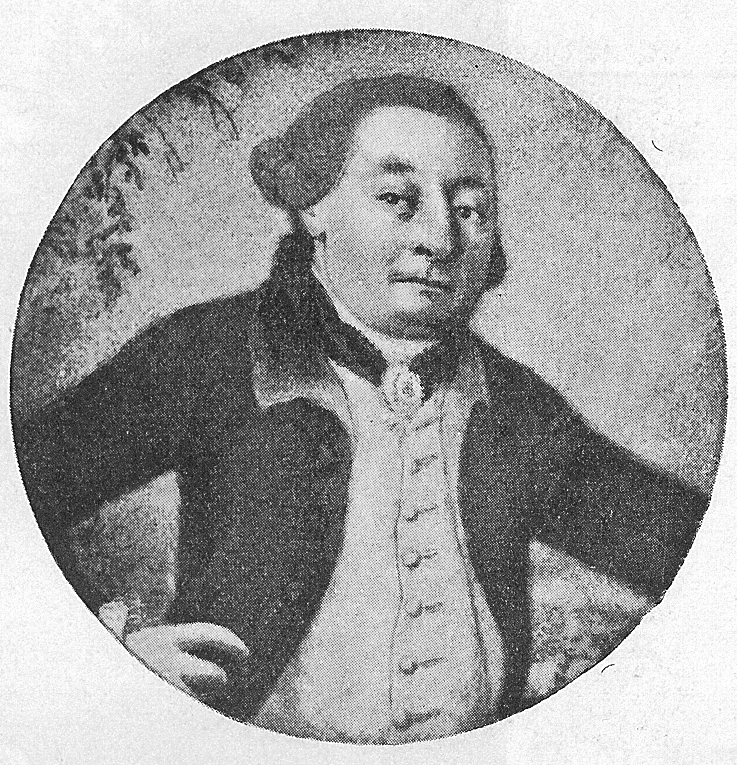
Alexamder Walker Ross.

Alexander (Walker) Ross (17 December 1710 – 22 April 1792) was a Danish Military Prosecutor General and General War Commissioner. On 12 June 1782, he was ennobled under the name Ross.

== Early life ==
Alexander Walker was born on 17 December 1710 in Copenhagen, the son of wholesale merchant (grosserer) Daniel Walker (1680–1759) and Marie Ross (1680–1715). His mother was the daughter of wholesale merchant (grosserer) Alexander Ross (1659–1722) and Catharina Elisabeth Abbestée (1675 - 1735). Her father was a member of the Scottish family Ross of Balnagown. The wife's sister Elisabeth Maria Abbestée (1677–1752) was married to court wine merchant Herman Fabritius (1667–1729). Her father and Fabritius bought Tomb No. 2 in the burial chapel of Holmen Church in 1716 (deed issued 16 June 1716).

== Career ==
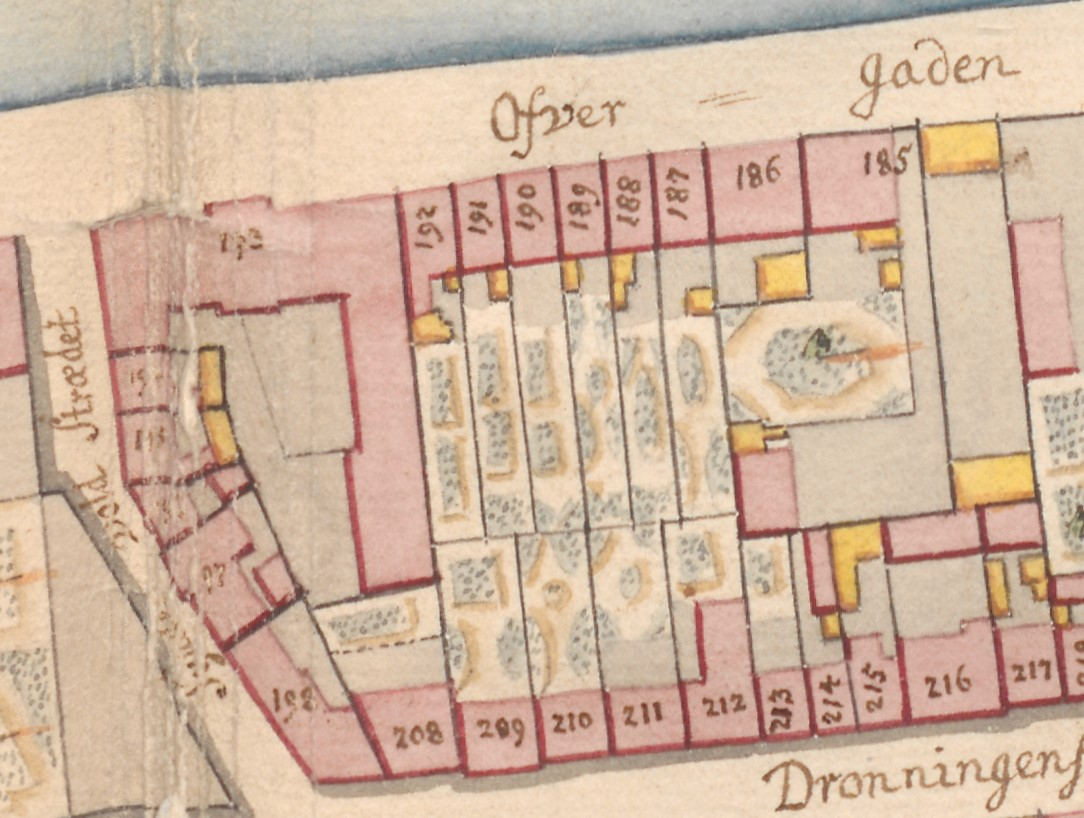
No. 193 seen on a detail from Christian Gedde's map of Christianshavn Quarter, 1757.

On 5 June 1749, he was appointed as regiment quarter master in Prince Frederick's Regiment. On 28 October 1749, he was appointed as overkrigskommissær. On 26 October 1642, he was appointed as Military Prosecutor General. In 1873, he was appointed as General War Commissioner.

On 12 June 1782, he was ennobled under the name Ross.

Ross and Jonas Collin owned a clay pipe factory at Overgaden Oven Vandet No. 193 from at least the 1750s. In 1779, it was sold to Thomas Potter.

== Personal life ==
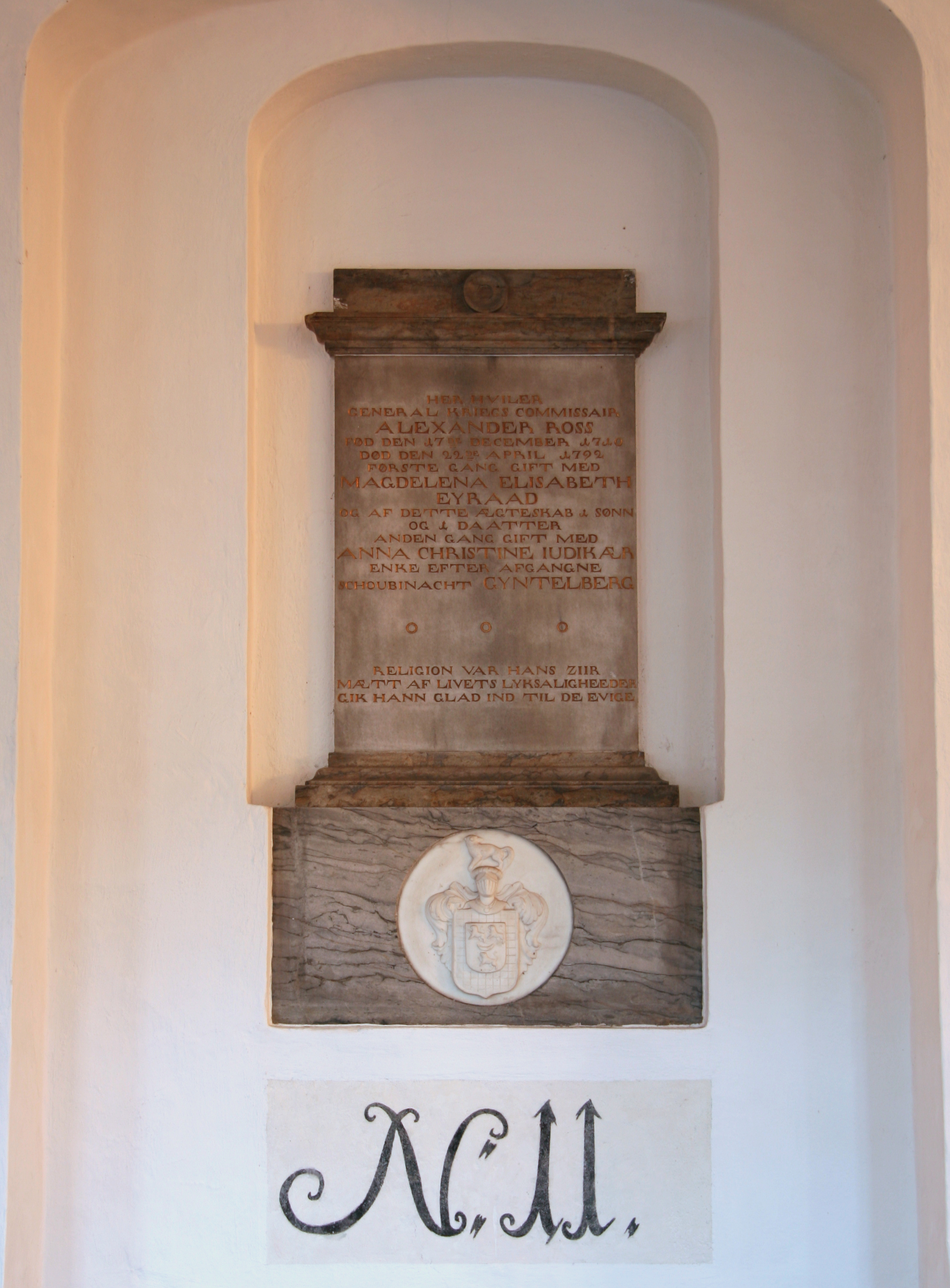
Epitaph to Alexander Ross in Holmen Church.

Ross married on 28 May 1744 in the FFrench Reformed Church to Magdalene Elisabeth Herault (1719-). She was the daughter of Pastor Paul Herault and Marie Persode. He was after her death on 23 March 1768 married to Anne Christine Judichær (1699–1776).

Ross resided at Aabenraa No. 258. In the 1770s, he also owned a country house in Taarbæk. Ross died on 22 April 1792. He was buried in the chapel of Holmen Church./
