= Steinfass House =

Listed house in Copenhagen, Denmark

Coordinates: 55.6717°N 12.5900°E

- Steinfass' Gård
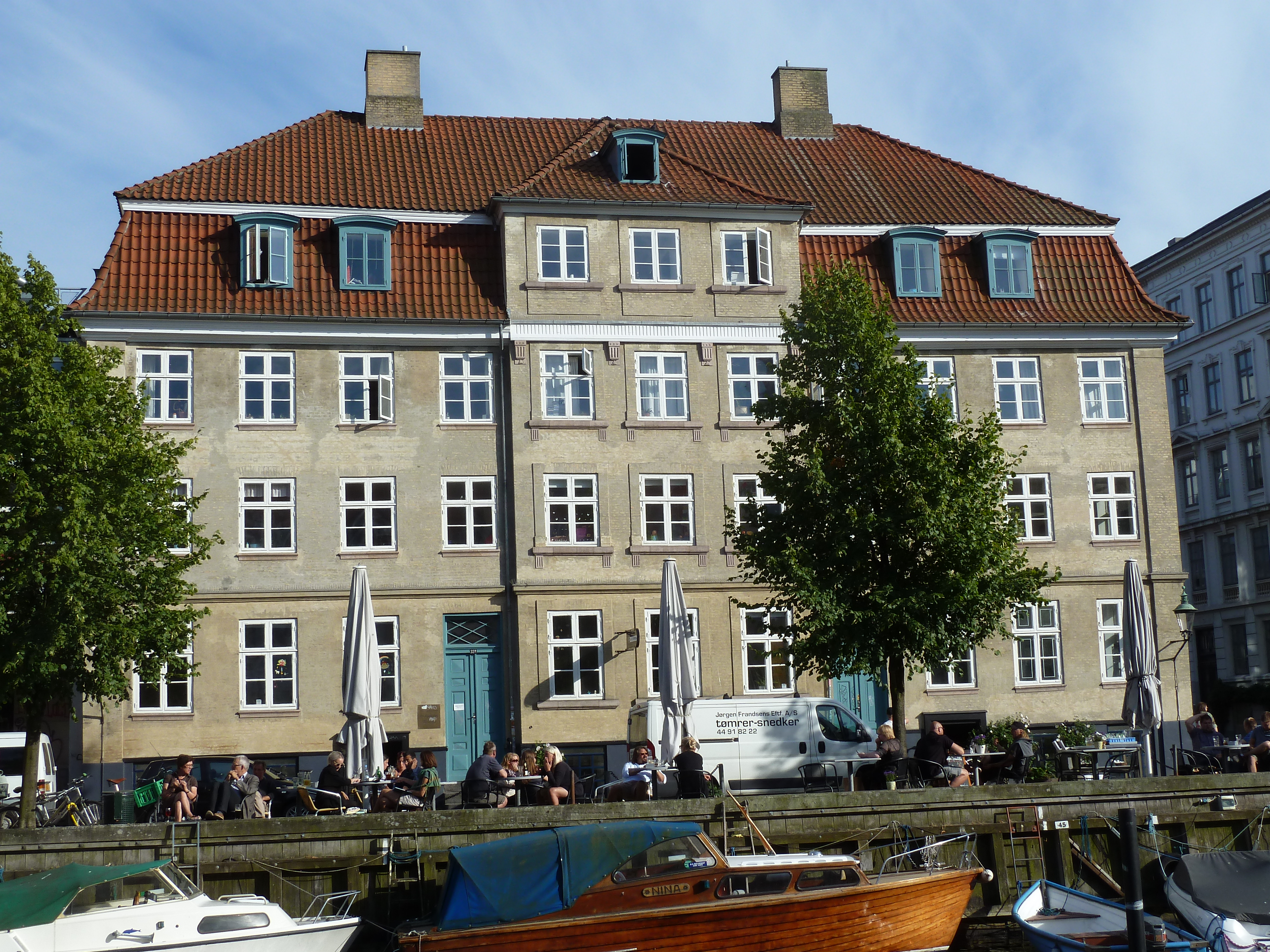
- The building seen from across the canal
- Interactive map of the Steinfass House area

General information
- Architectural style: Neoclassical
- Location: Copenhagen, Denmark, Denmark
- Completed: 1771
- Client: Jacob Steinfass
- Owner: Sofiegården

Steinfass House (Danish: Steinfass Gård) is a listed house overlooking Christianshavn Canal in the Christianshavn neighbourhood of Copenhagen, Denmark. It is now part of the Sofiegården hall of residence.

== History ==
=== 17th and 18th centuries ===
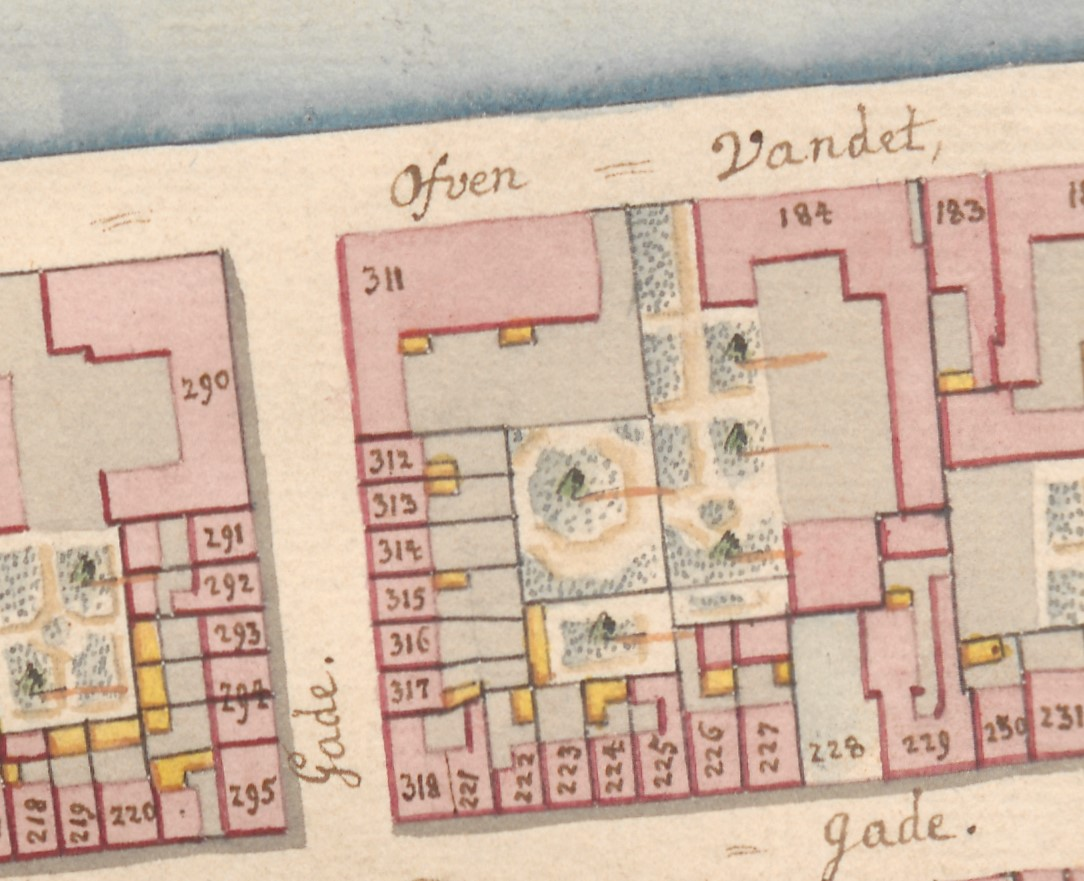
No. 311 seen in a detail from Christian Gedde's map of Christianshavn Quarter, 1757

A larger property at the site was listed as No. 102 in Christianshavn Quarter in Copenhagen's first cadastre of 1789. It was at that time owned by judge Iver Caspersen. It was later divided into a number of smaller properties. The property now known as Overgaden Oven Vandet 32 was listed as No. 311 in the new cadastre of 1756. It was at that time owned by Lars Pedersen Tøyberg.

The current house was built for Jacob Steinfass in 1770–71 to a design by an unknown architect.

=== 19th century ===
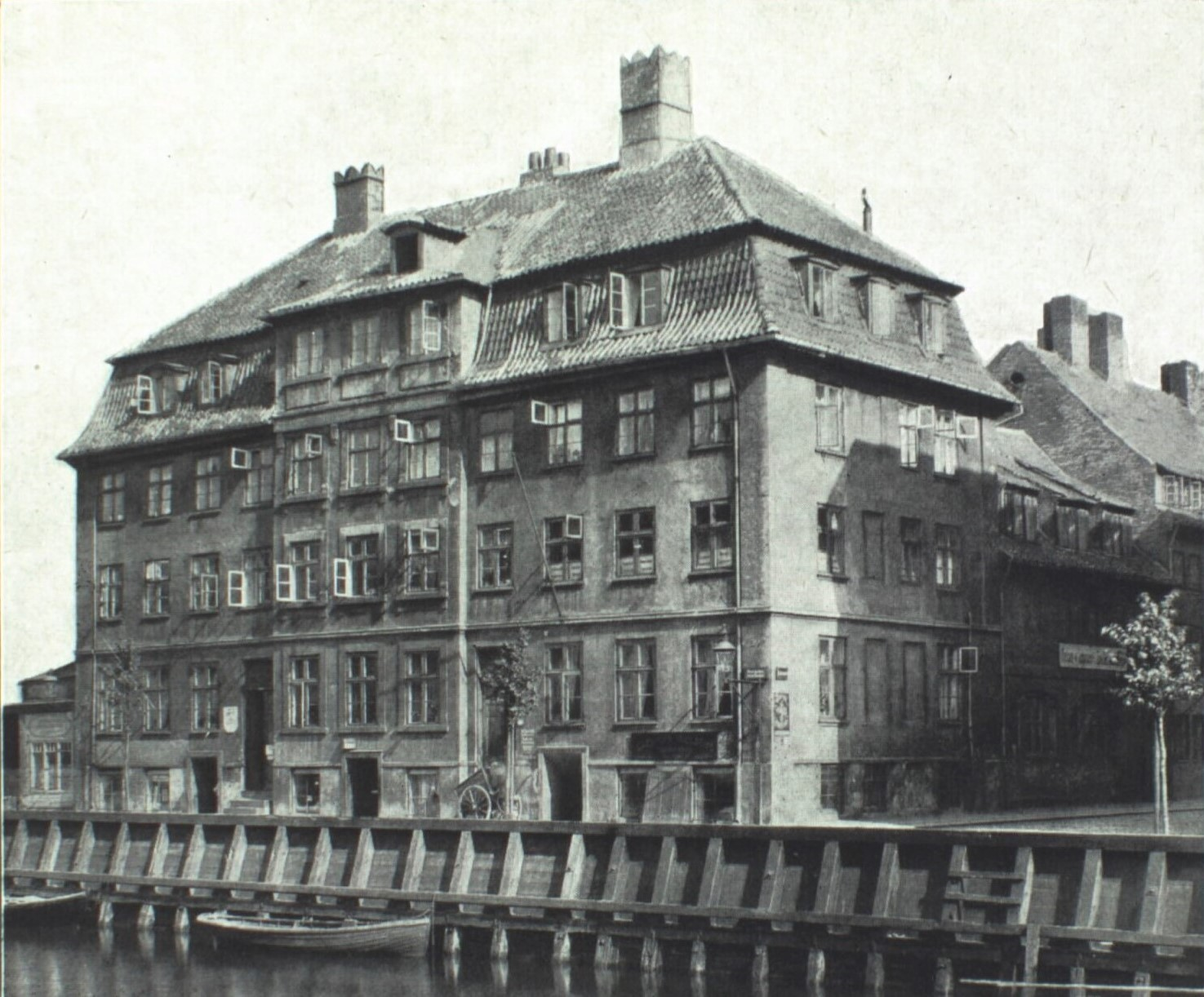
The Steinfass House, photographed by Kristian Hude

The property was listed as No. 186 in the new cadastre of 1806. It was at that time owned by haulier Jens Olsen.

The painter P. C. Skovgaard lived in the building from 1842 to 1843. The building was listed in 1945.

== Architecture ==
Steinfass House is built in the Neoclassical style. It was built as an adaption and extension of an existing building and incorporates elements from its predecessor.

== Today ==
In the early 1970s, the house was converted into a dorm, Sofiegården, and expanded with modern wings along Sofiegade and Dronningensgade. The original contains five rooms and two three-room flats in two upper floors, and various shared facilities on the ground floor, including a day-care centre. The basement houses the bar Sofiekælderen which is popular for live music.
