= Cort Adeler =

Norwegian seaman (1622–1675)

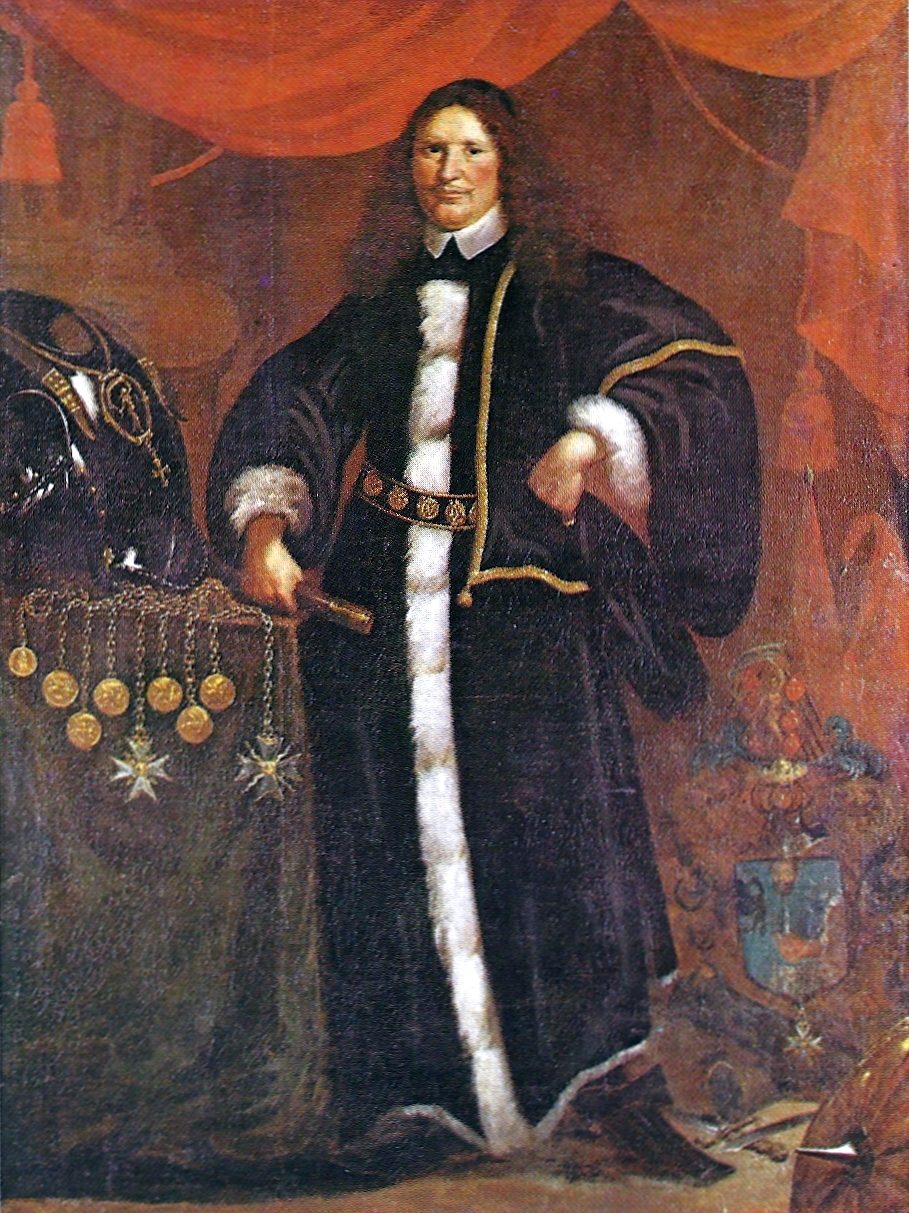
- Born: 16 December 1622; Brevik, Norway
- Died: 5 November 1675 (aged 52)
- Military career
- Allegiance: Denmark-Norway, Republic of Venice, Dutch Republic

Cort Sivertsen Adeler (16 December 1622 – 5 November 1675), known in Denmark as Coort Sifvertsen Adelaer, in the Netherlands as Koert Sievertsen Adelaer and in Italy as Curzio Suffrido Adelborst, was the name of honour given to Kurt Sivertsen, a Norwegian seaman, who rendered distinguished service to the Dano-Norwegian and Dutch navies, and also to the Republic of Venice against the Turks.

== Early naval career ==
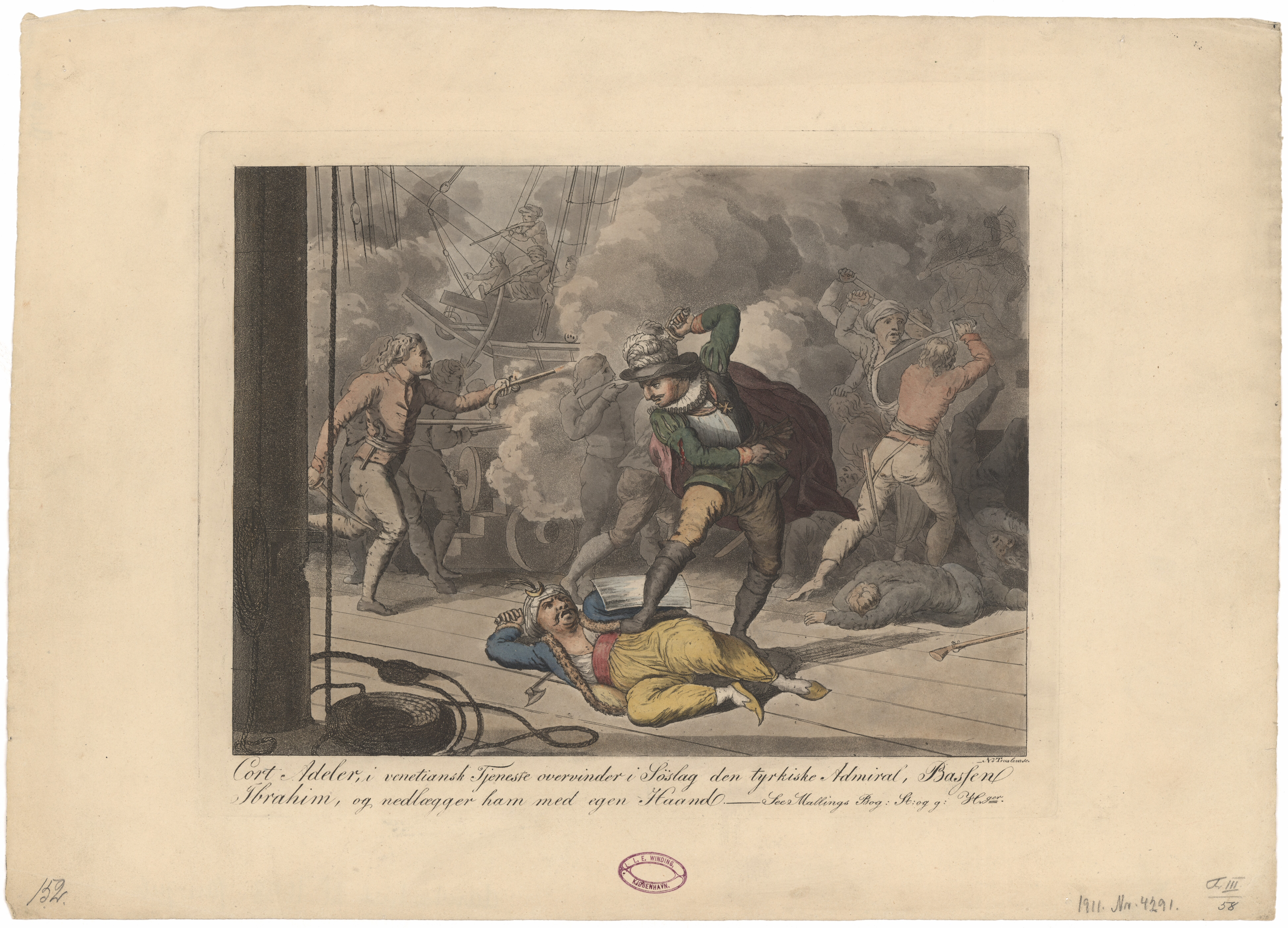
Cort Adeler in Venetian service, defeating the Turks.

Cort Sivertsen was born in Brevik, Norway, the son of a shipper. At the age of 15, he went into service with the Dutch navy; in 1639 he fought under Lieutenant-Admiral Maarten Tromp at the Battle of the Downs. In 1642, he was first mate on the Grote St. Joris, a Dutch ship hired by the fleet of Venice as the San Giorgio Grande. Sivertsen called himself Adelborst in this period, a Dutch name meaning "cadet". In 1645, he became captain of the San Giorgio and entered full Venetian service. In 1650, the San Giorgio became a flagship and Sivertsen became flag captain. In an action against the Turkish fleet on 13 May 1654, near the Dardanelles, his ship broke a line of Turkish galleys and sank 15 of them; the following day the Turkish garrison of Tenedos surrendered to him. In recognition of this victory, he was knighted in the Order of Saint Mark; the Venetian senate rewarded him with an annuity of 1400 golden ducats. In 1660, he became Vice-Admiral.

== Merchant ==
During this period, Sivertsen had maintained close connections with the Dutch Republic, raising his son, Sivert Adeler, there. During this period, he changed his name to Adelaer (adelaar), Dutch for "Eagle". His son, Sivert Adeler, served as a cadet on the ship of the famous Dutch Vice-Admiral Michiel de Ruyter. Retiring from Venetian service, he worked from 1661 till 1663 for an Amsterdam merchant house under a supply contract with the Admiralty of Amsterdam, one of the five Dutch admiralties. In 1665, when the Second Anglo-Dutch War threatened, he was offered a position in the Dutch navy as a Vice-Admiral, but he refused. He started a salt company together with William Davidson of Curriehill and Jonas Trellond in Denmark. After the death of the Dutch supreme commander, Lieutenant-Admiral Jacob van Wassenaer Obdam in the Battle of Lowestoft, Adelaer was considered for the position, but again indicated that he had no interest in it.

== Danish and Dutch naval operations ==
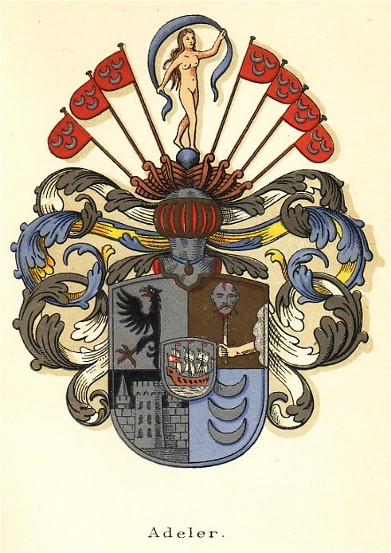
Coat of arms.

In 1663, Adelaer had begun working as an agent for the Danish-Norwegian navy, that in this period had close ties with the Dutch navy. The leading Dutch military advisors in Denmark-Norway, including Frederick Stachouwer and Volckert Schram, were recalled to the Dutch Republic because of their expertise in amphibious landings, to be employed in a planned landing on the English coast which in 1667 materialised as the Raid on the Medway. Subsequently, Adelaer was asked to join the Danish-Norwegian navy as operational supreme commander, to supervise the modernisation of their fleet. In 1666 King Frederick III personally convinced Adelaer by offering him a considerable commission. While in the Dutch Navy any commoner could be appointed in the highest positions, in Denmark-Norway it was still mandatory to be of nobility to command, so Adelaer became a Danish-Norwegian Knight Coort Sifvertsen Adelaer in order to become Admiral-General.

During Adelaer's command the navy was expanded with 30 new ships-of-the-line. In the years 1669 and 1670 he headed a diplomatic mission to South-India to establish trade relations with Coromandel. Adeler acquired a substantial private capital and owned among others estates Gjemsø Kloster and Bratsberg near the city of Skien in Norway.

== Later life ==
Adelaer was a personal friend of the new Dutch supreme commander Lieutenant-Admiral Michiel de Ruyter who also had been knighted in Denmark, for his victory over Sweden in 1659. A large part of their correspondence in Dutch has survived. In 1675 Denmark joined the Dutch in the Franco-Dutch War; Sweden then declared war. Adelaer commanded a single minor action against the Swedish fleet—the only time he would actually fight in Danish service—but during an epidemic that swept Scandinavia that Fall, Adelaer was afflicted and died after many weeks of suffering on 5 November 1675 at Copenhagen. He was replaced as supreme commander on 8 May 1676 by a Dutch Admiral, Cornelis Tromp.

== Personal life ==
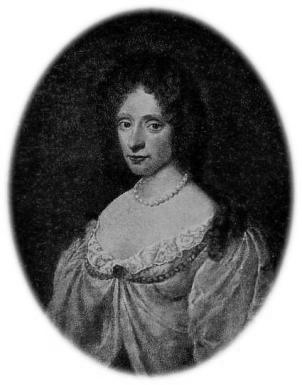
Anna Andersdatter Pelt (1640 - 1692).

Adelaer was first married in 1656 in Hoorn (Netherlands) to Angelica Sophronia (died before 1661) and secondly in 1662 in Amsterdam with Anna Pelt (1640–1692). Descendants of Cort Adeler became members of a Danish noble family when Admiral Cort Adeler was converted into position of nobility on 7 February 1666. Cort Adeler's older son, Sivert Cortsen Adeler was a Danish naval officer. His younger son, Frederik Christian Adeler, was a Danish Councilor and Prefect in Zealand Diocese and his grandson, Frederik Adeler (1700–1766) was a government official and landowner, who served as a County Governor of several counties in Norway and Denmark. His daughter Susanne Elisabeth Adeler was married to Frederik Eiler Giedde, til Nordskov og Hindemae (1641–1717), a son of Ove Ghedde. Another daughter, Sophie Amalie Adeler (1661–1734), was married to count Adam Friederich von Trampe, til Løgismose (1650–1704). Members of the family have been associated with a number of Danish estates including Ulstrup Slot. The Cort Adeler House, Cort Adeler's former home in Copenhagen, located at Strandgade 22 in Christianshavn, is a listed building.

== Legacy ==
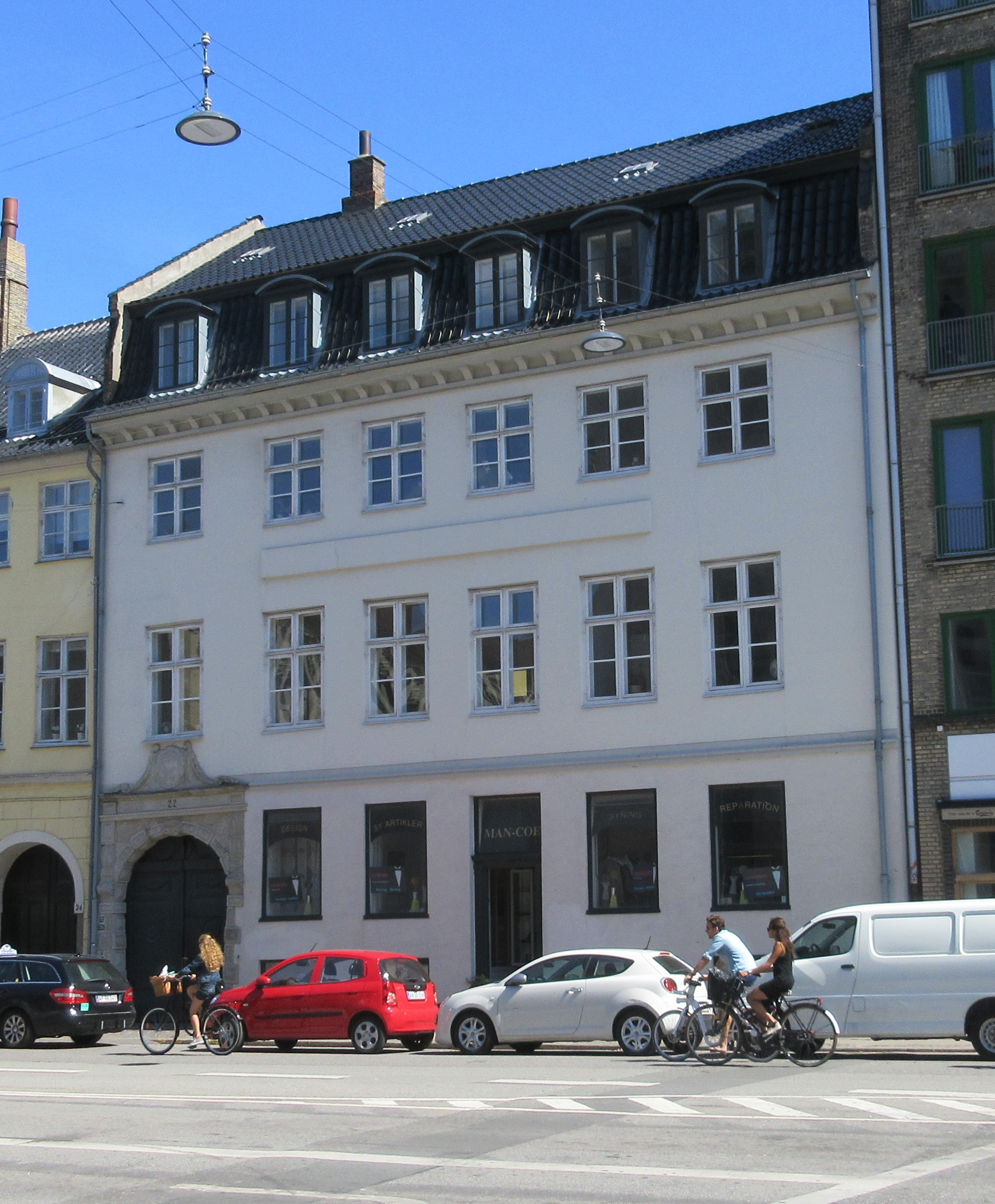
Cort Adeler House in Christianshavn, Copenhagen

During the period of romantic nationalism in the 19th century, Adelaer gained the status of Norwegian naval hero, largely due his appearance in a novel by the romantic Danish writer Bernhard Severin Ingemann. Several Norwegian towns, including the city of Oslo, have a street called Cort Adelers Gade.

The street Cort Adelers Gade in Copenhagen's Gammelholm neighbourhood was named after Cort Adeler in the 1860s. Cort Adelers Gade in Aarhus was named after him in 1901.

== Other sources ==
- Holck, Preben Cort Adeler (Copenhagen: 1934)
- Bruun, Christian Curt Sivertsen Adelaer (Copenhagen: 1871)
- Aas, L. Cort Adeler. Den norske sjøhelt (Oslo, 1943)
