= Era Ora =

Italian restaurant in Denmark

Era Ora was a one Michelin-star Italian restaurant located in the Christianshavn neighbourhood of Copenhagen, Denmark.

== History ==
Era Ora was opened in 1983 by Italian born chef Elvio Milleri and his Brazilian-born wife Edelvita Santos. The restaurant was then located at Torvegade 62 and the owners lived on the first floor. The restaurant received its first star in the Michelin Guide in 1997.

The restaurant relocated to premises at Christianshavn Canal in 2001. In 2020, the restaurant lost its Michelin-star, and closed soon after.
