= Laksegade 26 =

Historical building in Copenhagen, Denmark

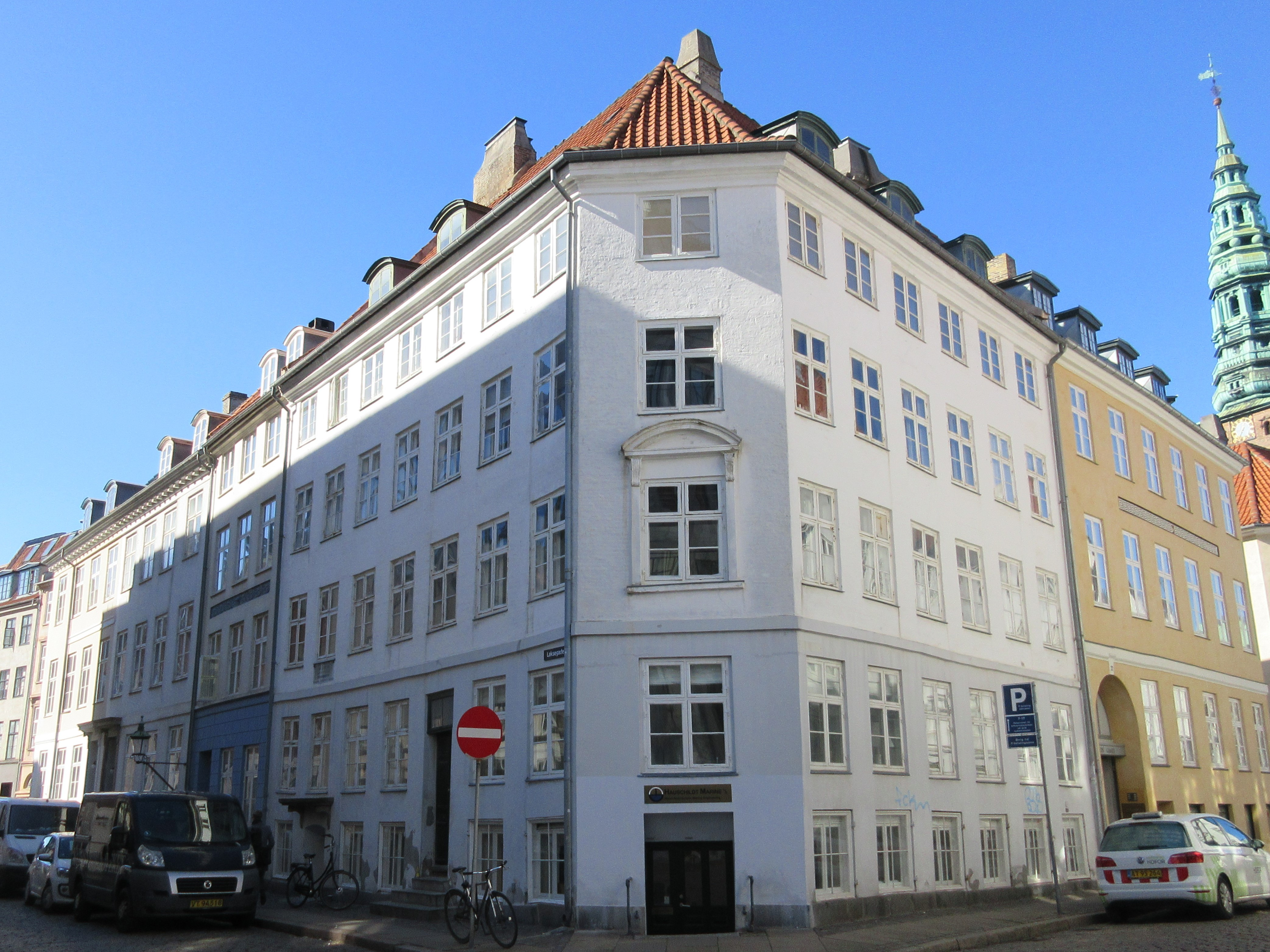
- Interactive map of the Laksegade 26 area

General information
- Architectural style: Neoclassical
- Location: Copenhagen, Denmark
- Coordinates: 55°40′39.72″N 12°34′58.08″E
- Completed: 1798

Laksegade 26 is a Neoclassical property situated at the corner of Laksegade and Nikolajgade in central Copenhagen, Denmark. It was listed in the Danish registry of protected buildings and places in 1939. A plaque on the facade towards Laksegade commemorates the architect Theophilus Hansen, who was born in the building.

== History ==
=== Site history, 1689–1795 ===
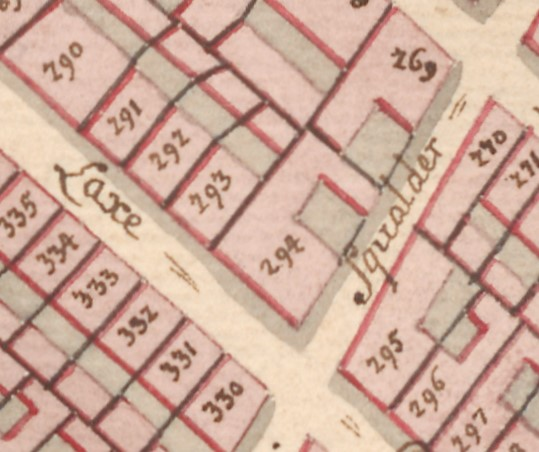
No. 293 and No. 294 seen on a detail from Christian Gedde's map of the East Quarter, 1757.

In 1689, the site was made up of two properties. One of them was listed in Copenhagen's first cadastre from 1689 as No. 250 in Eastern Quarter, owned by captain Johan Siverts. The other one was listed as No. 251).

The old No. 250 was listed in the new cadastre of 1756 as No. 293, owned by Rentekammer courier Hans Jespersen. The old No. 251 was listed as No. 294, owned by Johan Bram Sommerfeldt.

=== Tofte and the new building ===
Together with the rest of the neighborhood, the buildings were destroyed in the Copenhagen Fire of 1795. The two lots were subsequently merged into a single property by ship captain Johan Hansen Tofte (1743–1803). The present building on the site was constructed for him in 1797–1798. His widow Anna Chatrine Matthiasdatter (20 May 1759 – 7 November 1821) kept the property after her husband's death. It was listed as No. 194 in the new cadastre of 1806 and was still owned by her.

=== Kater history ===
Architect Theophilus Hansen (1813–1891) was born in the building. His elder brother, Christian Hansen, who also became an architect, was then ten years old. Their parents were Rasmus Hansen (Braathen) from Norway (1774–1824) and Sophie Elisabeth Jensen, couriers for Kjøbenhavns Brandforsikring (Copenhagen Fire Insurance).

With the introduction of house numbering by street in Copenhagen in 1859 as a supplement to the cadastral numbers by quarter, No. 194 became Laksegade 26 and Nikolajgade 24.

== Architecture ==
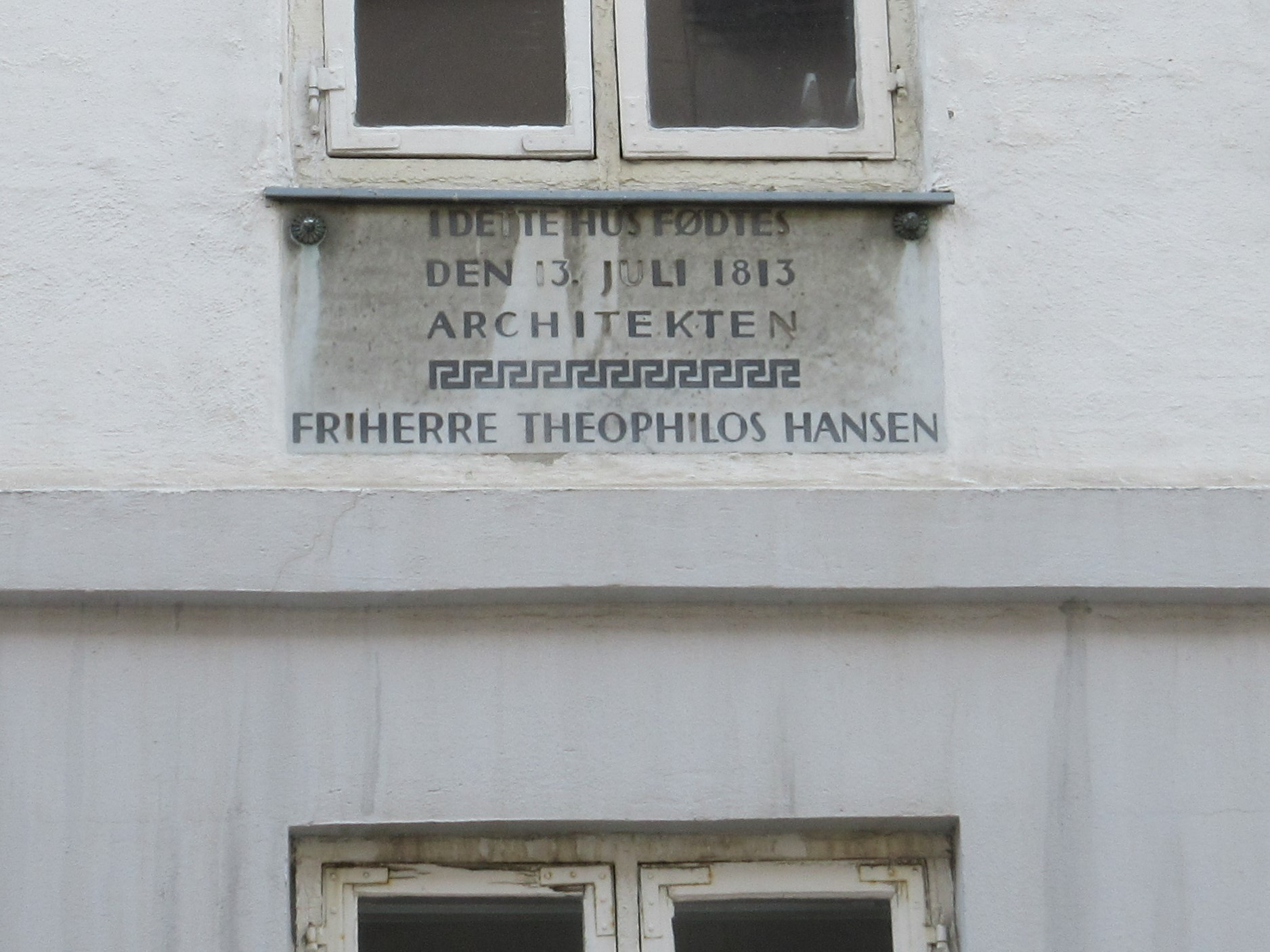
Commemorative plaque

The building is constructed in brick on a granite foundation with four storeys over a walk-out-basement. It is plastered and painted white. The facade towards Laksegade is seven bays long and the one towards Nikolajgade is six bays long. The chamfered corner bay was dictated for all corner buildings by Jørgen Henrich Rawert's and Peter Meyn's guidelines for the rebuilding of the city after the fire so that the fire department's long ladder companies could navigate the streets more easily. The facade is finished by a cornice band above the ground floor and a cornice under the roof. The corner window on the first floor is topped by a curved pediment supported by corbels. The slightly inset main entrance, in Laksegade, third bay from the right, is raised four steps from street level and is topped by a transom window. A basement entrance in the second bay from the left towards Laksegade is topped by a hood mould consisting of a sandstone plate supported by corbels. A second basement entrance is located in the chamfered corner bay. The pitched roof is clad in red tiles. It features two dormer windows towards Laksegade and three towards Nikolajgade.

A plaque above the basement entrance in Laksegade commemorates Theophil Hansen, an architect that was born in the building. It was installed in 1963 at the initiative of Danske Arkitekters Landsforbund.

== Today ==
The building is owned by E/F Laksegade 26.
