= Sofiegade =

Street in Copenhagen, Denmark

Sofiegade is a street in the Christianshavn neighbourhood of central Copenhagen, Denmark. It runs from Christianshavns Kanal in the northwest to Christianshavns Voldgade and Christianshavns Vold in the southeast, passing Dronningensgade and Prinsessegade on the way.

== History ==
Sofiegade is one of the streets that date from the foundation of Christianshavn in the beginning of the 17th century. It was originally called Sankt Sofie Gade, complementing Sankt Annæ Gade on the opposite of Torvegade. Sankt Sofiegade, like Sankt Annæ Gade today, was originally located on both sides of Christianshavns Kanal but with no bridge to connect them. The two street sections became known as Store Sofiegade (Large Sofiegade) and Lille Sofiegade (Small Sofiegade) respectively.

The site at the corner of Store Sofiegade and Prinsessegade, closest to Christians Vold, was in 1732 acquired by a brewer and turned into a brewery and beer garden. After a few years, it was turned into a textile factory. The property was acquired in 1786 by Thomas Potter and turned into an iron foundry. Some of his employees also lived in the street. His own home was located at the site from 1806/7 until his death in 1811. The iron foundry existed until 1927 and the buildings were demolished in the 1970s.

Lille Sofiegade, which was located on the west side of the canal, disappeared in 1865 as a result of expanding industrial activity in the area. Store Sofiegade was from then on simply known as Sofiegade.

== Notable buildings and residents ==
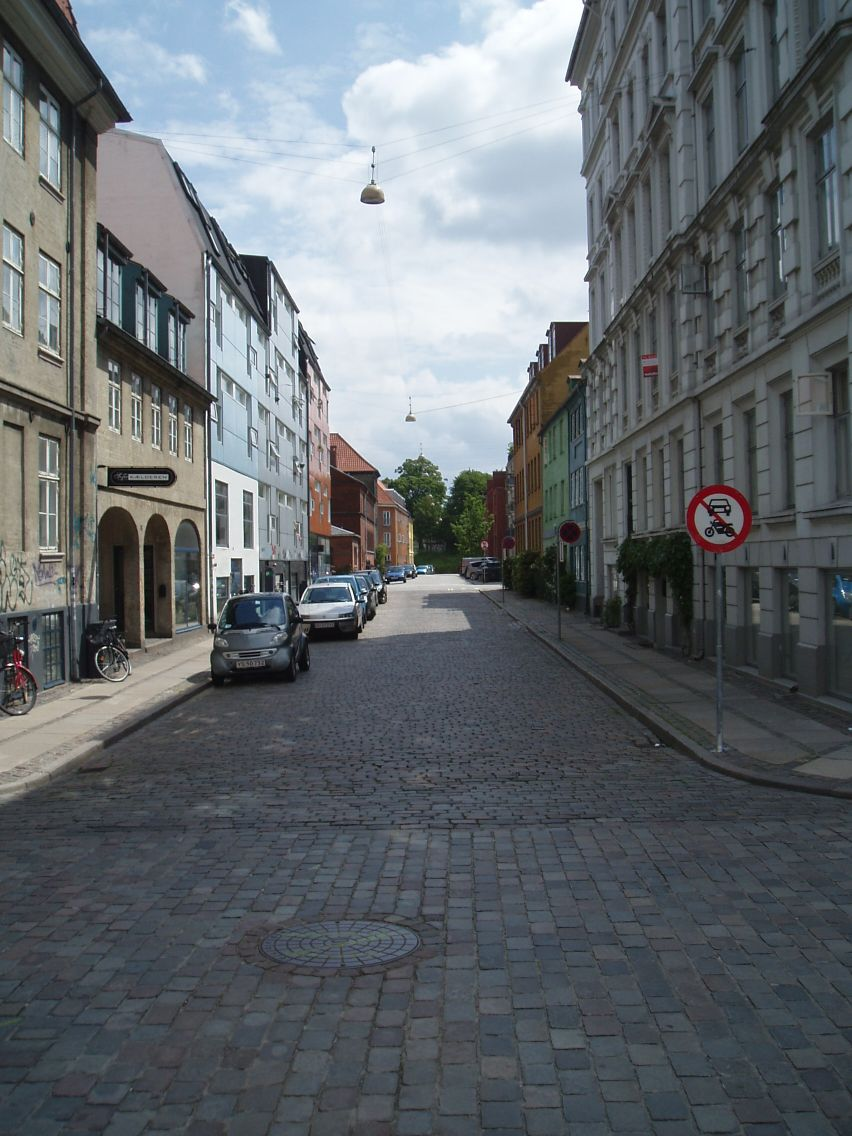
Sofiegade

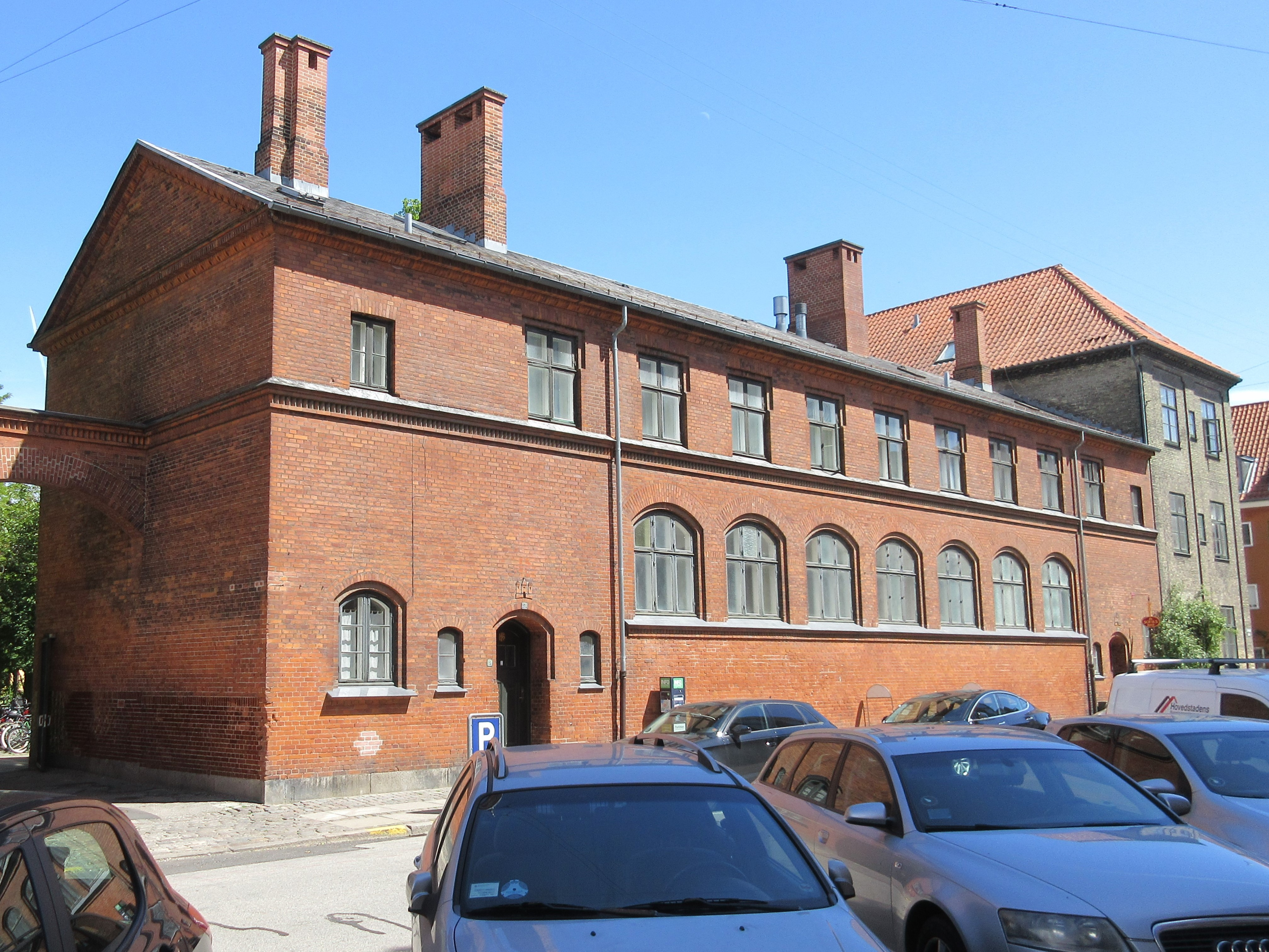
No. 15A: SofieBadet

SofieBadet (No. 15A) is a public bath house from 1909. It was designed by Hans Wright and remained in use until 1927. The building was listed in 2000 and has since reopened as a public wellness centre. The modern building at No. 3-7 is part of the dorm Sofiegården which takes its name after the street. The listed Steinfass House, which fronts Christianhacns Kanal, is also part of the dorm.

== Public art and memorials ==
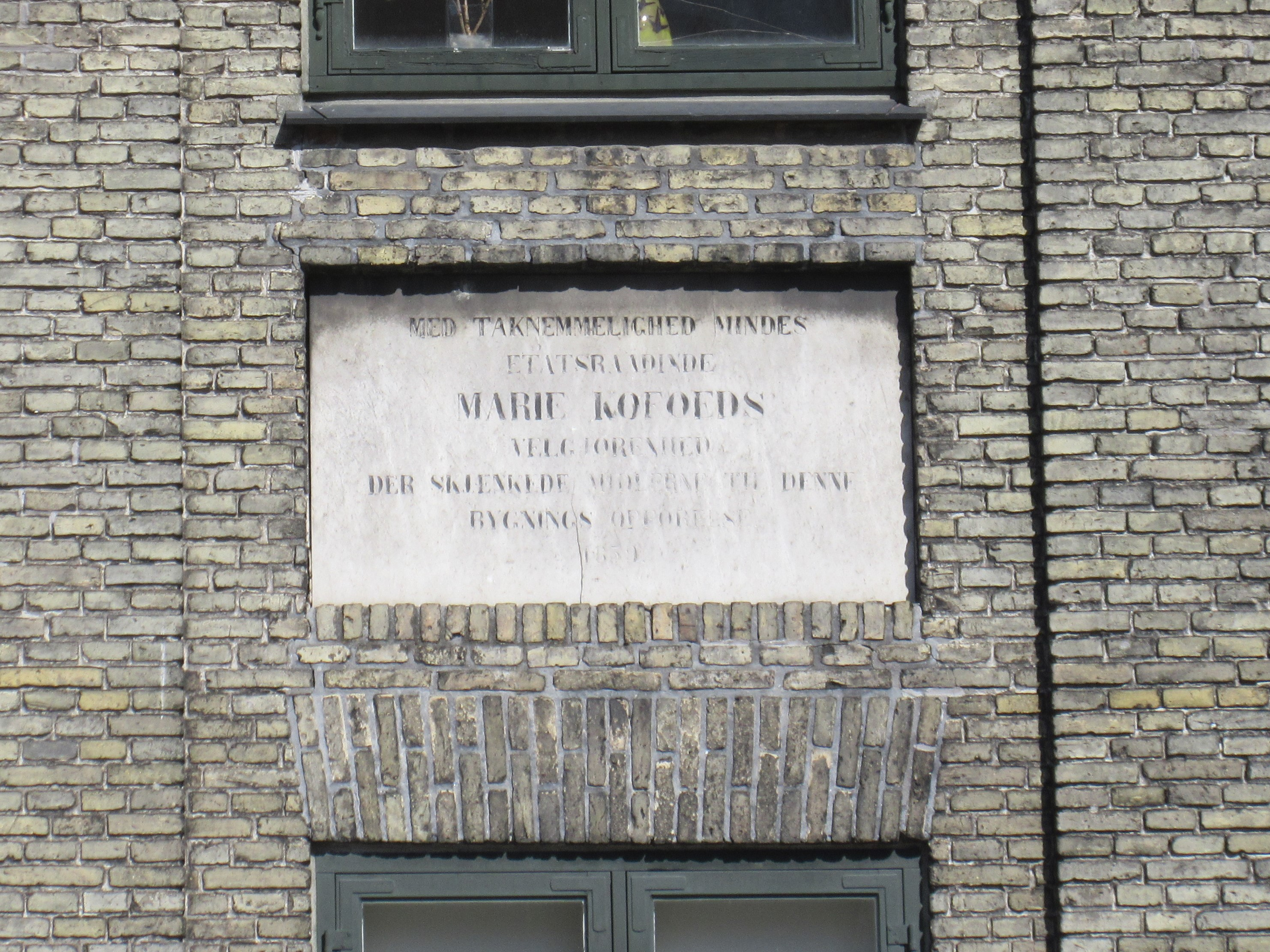
Commemorative plaque at the corner of Sofiegade in Copenhagen

On the building at the corner of Sofiegade and Dronningensgade is a commemorative plaque dedicated to Marie Kofoed. She owned the nearby Heering House.

== See also ==
- Sjællandsgade Public Baths
