= Niels Peter Hillebrandt =

Danish musician

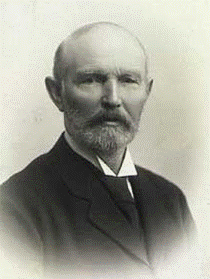
Niels Peter Hillebrandt

Niels Peter Hillebrandt (September 14, 1815 - February 11, 1885) was a Danish organist and composer.

== See also ==
- List of Danish composers
