= Brøste House =

Historic property in Copenhagen, Denmark

Coordinates: 55.6708°N 12.5887°E

- Brøstes Gård
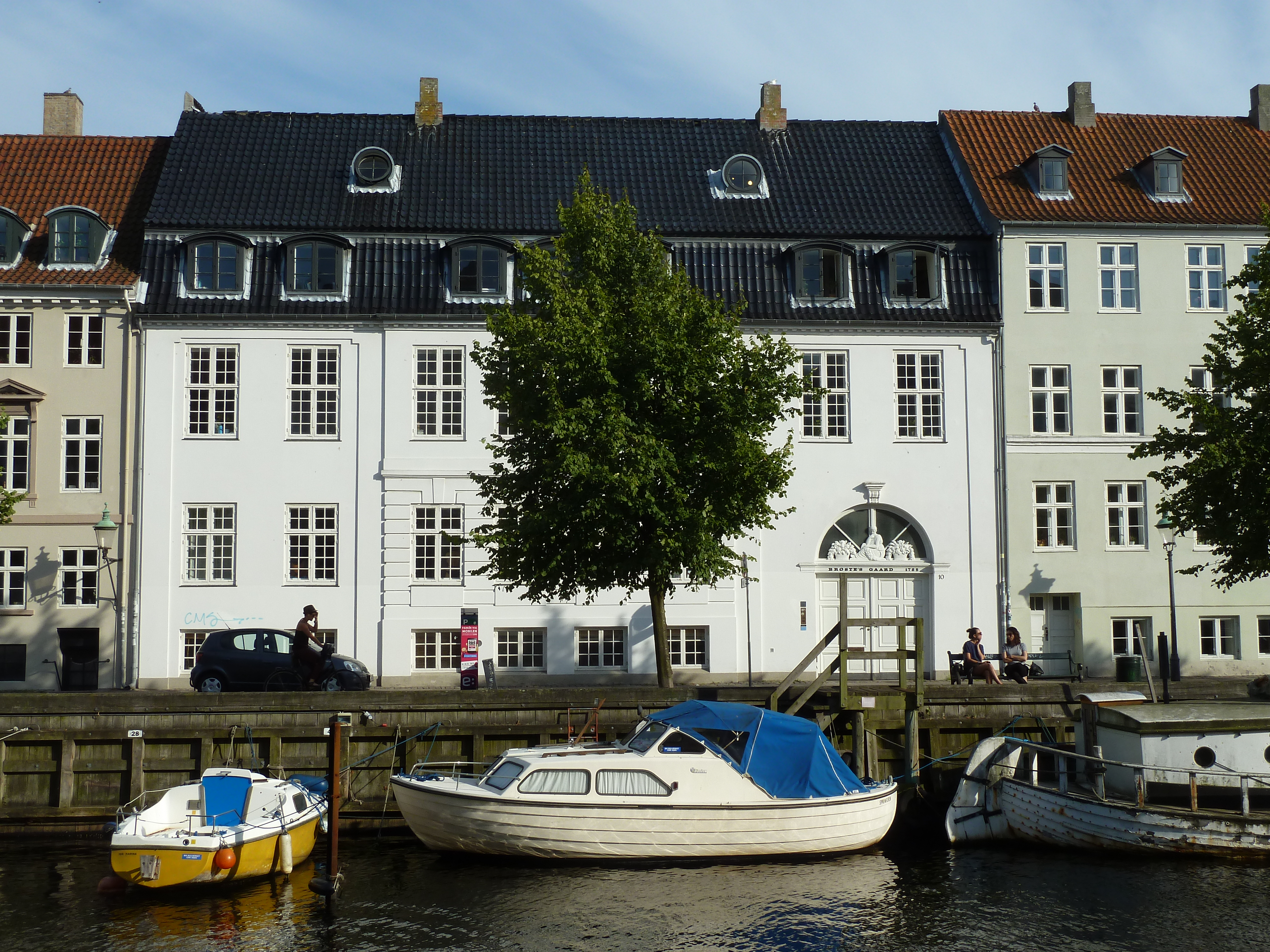
- The building seen from across the canal
- Interactive map of the Brøste House area

General information
- Architectural style: Neoclassical
- Location: Copenhagen, Denmark, Denmark
- Completed: 1785
- Client: Thomas Potter
- Owner: Barfoed Group

Brøste House (Danish: Brøstes Gård), also known as Potter House (Danish: Potters Gård) after its founder, Thomas Potter, a Scottish born industrialist, is a late 18th-century historic property at Overgaden Oven Vandet 10, overlooking Christianshavn Canal, in the Christianshavn neighbourhood of Copenhagen, Denmark. The building was listed in the Danish registry of protected buildings and places in 1918. It is now owned by Barfoed Group.

== History ==
=== Early history ===
In the late 17th century the site was part of four separate properties, listed in Copenhagen's first cadastre from 1689 as No. 112, No. 113, No. 115 and No. 119 in Christianshavn Quarter. These properties were later merged into two. One of them was listed in the new cadastre of 1756 as No. 193 in Christianshavn Quarter and was at that time owned by overkrigskommisær Alexander Walker Ross and Jonas Collin. The other one was listed as No. 197 and belonged to Paul Olsen.

=== The clay pie factory ===
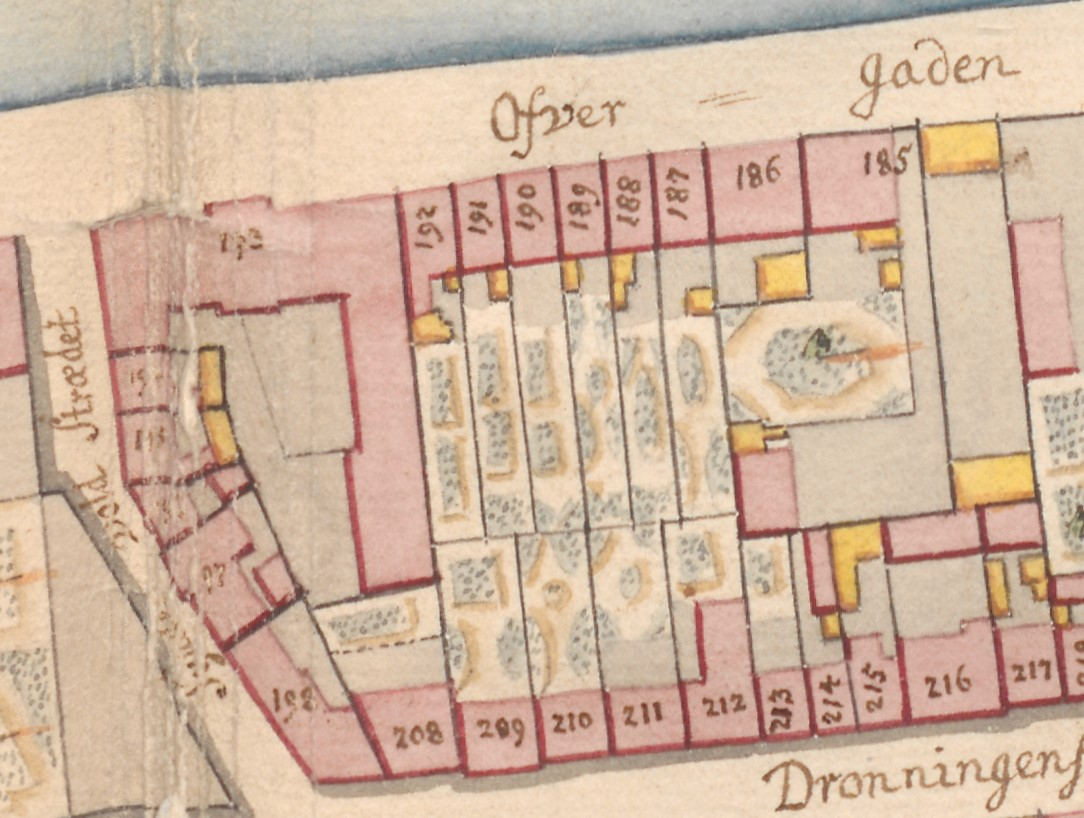
No. 193 seen in a detail from Christian Gedde's map of Christianshavn Quarter, 1757

No 193 had previously been the site of both a cloth and an arrow factory. It was later acquired by Alexander Walker Ross and Jonas Collin and used for the establishment of a clay pipe factory. The clay pipe factory was granted a royal monopoly. In 1752, Severin Ottosen Ferslev was employed as manager of the factory. In circa 1855, he bought it from the owners (deed: 11 February 1755). Already in May 1866, Kjøbenhavnske Danske Post-Tidender« printed an advert for Ferslev's pipes. For some reason, however, he did not acquire citizenship as a pipe manufacturer and as a tea-and-porcelain merchant until 19 September 1759.

=== Thomas Potter ===
In 1779, No. 193 was sold by public auction for r 3,360 Danish rigsdaler to Thomas Potter (1746–1811). Born in Edinburgh, he had emigrated to Denmark at an early age where he founded an iron foundry, Denmark's first, which he moved to his new property from its previous location on rented land at Applebys Plads. The house was built in 1785 to a design by an unknown architect. It had offices on the ground floor, packing in the cellar and his residence on the first floor.

Located to the rear of the new building, the foundry manufactured "iron pots in all shapes" as well as everything from nails and bullets to ship anchors. Some of its products were exported to both the East and West Indies.

Potter experienced deep personal grief while he lived in the building, losing two wives.

=== Changing owners ===
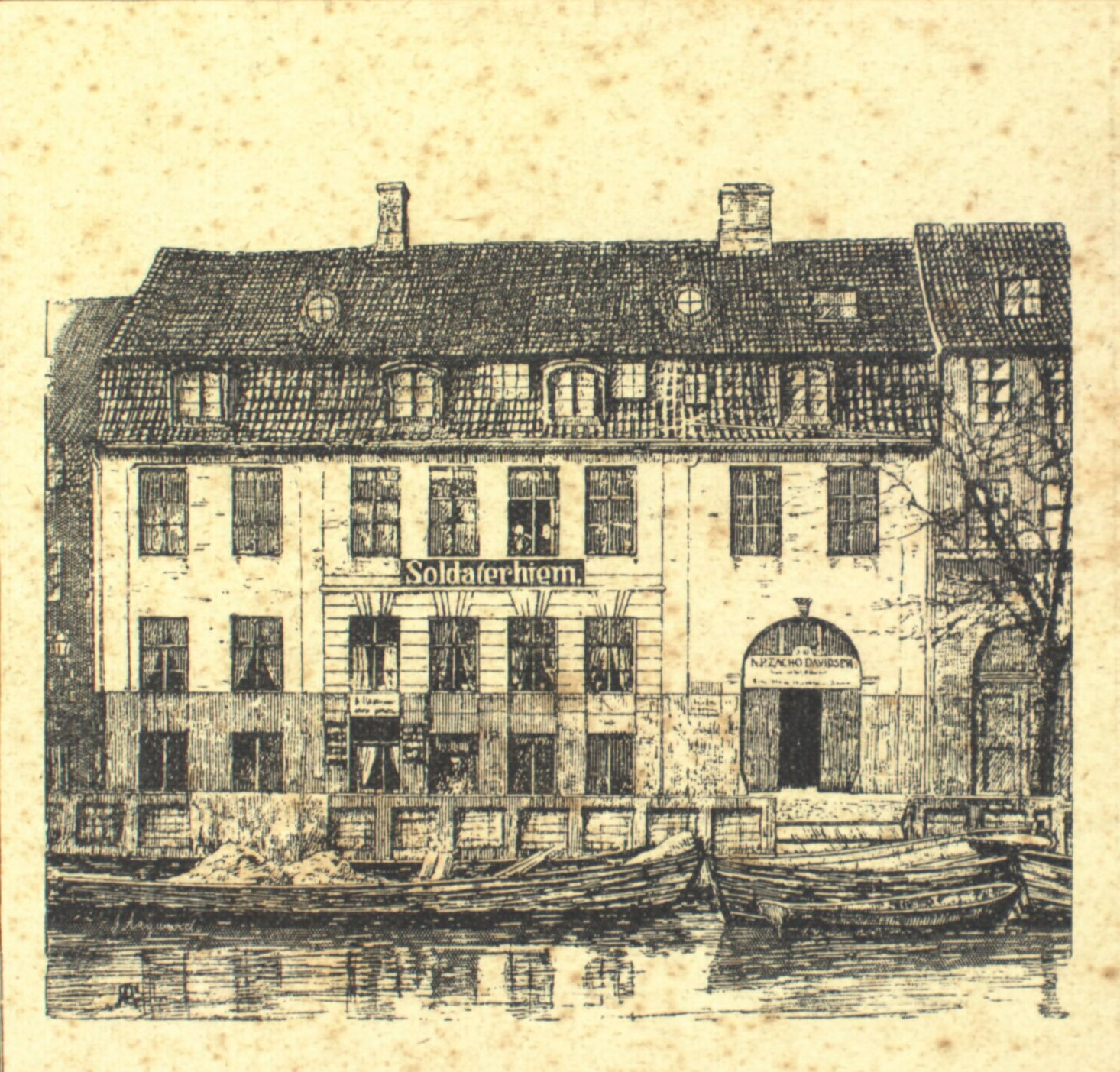
The Soldiers' Home

In 1790, Potter sold the house to a royal mecanicus, Andrew Mitchell, who established a button factory in the building. Poul Morten Johansen, a manufacturer of carriages, acquired the property in 1800. His property was listed as No. 197 in the new cadastre of 1806.

In 1808, Johansen sold it to Arent Harboe (1754–1808). He died later that same year and the property was then owned by his widow Marie Dorothea Neumann (1770–1843) until it was ceded to Copenhagen Fire Insurance (Kjøbenhavns Brandforsikring) in 1823–1824.

Frantz Friderich Güllich (c. 1799-1872), a calico textile printer, was a resident of the building before 1840. He resided on the first floor in 1840 and 1850.

The property was home to 26 residents at the 1860 census. Frantz Friderich Güllich (c. 1799-1872) resided on the ground floor with his wife Hansine Frederikke Georgia (née Preisler), their eight children (aged eight to 24), his sister Johane Dorethea Margrethe Güllich, 26-year-old Thomas Friderich Vilhel Güllich, one male servant and two maids. Dorethea Laurine Conradsen (née Møller), widow of the medallist Harald Conradsen, resided on the first floor with her son Rudolph Conradsen, her daughter Emma Conradsen, her granddaughter Oscar Conradsen, lodger Casper Christoffer Brink Siedelin (retired ritmeister), a housekeeper and a maid. Ig Thomsen Christensen, a merchant trading in Iceland, resided on the first floor with his wife Jensine Menulendra (née Abel), their 14-year-old foster daughter Ane Chathrine Jørgensen and one maid.

Later residents include the painter Julius Exner who lived there from 1861. In the 1890s, the property was owned by the furniture maker Fritz Hansen and used as a home for veterans.

=== Brøste's house ===
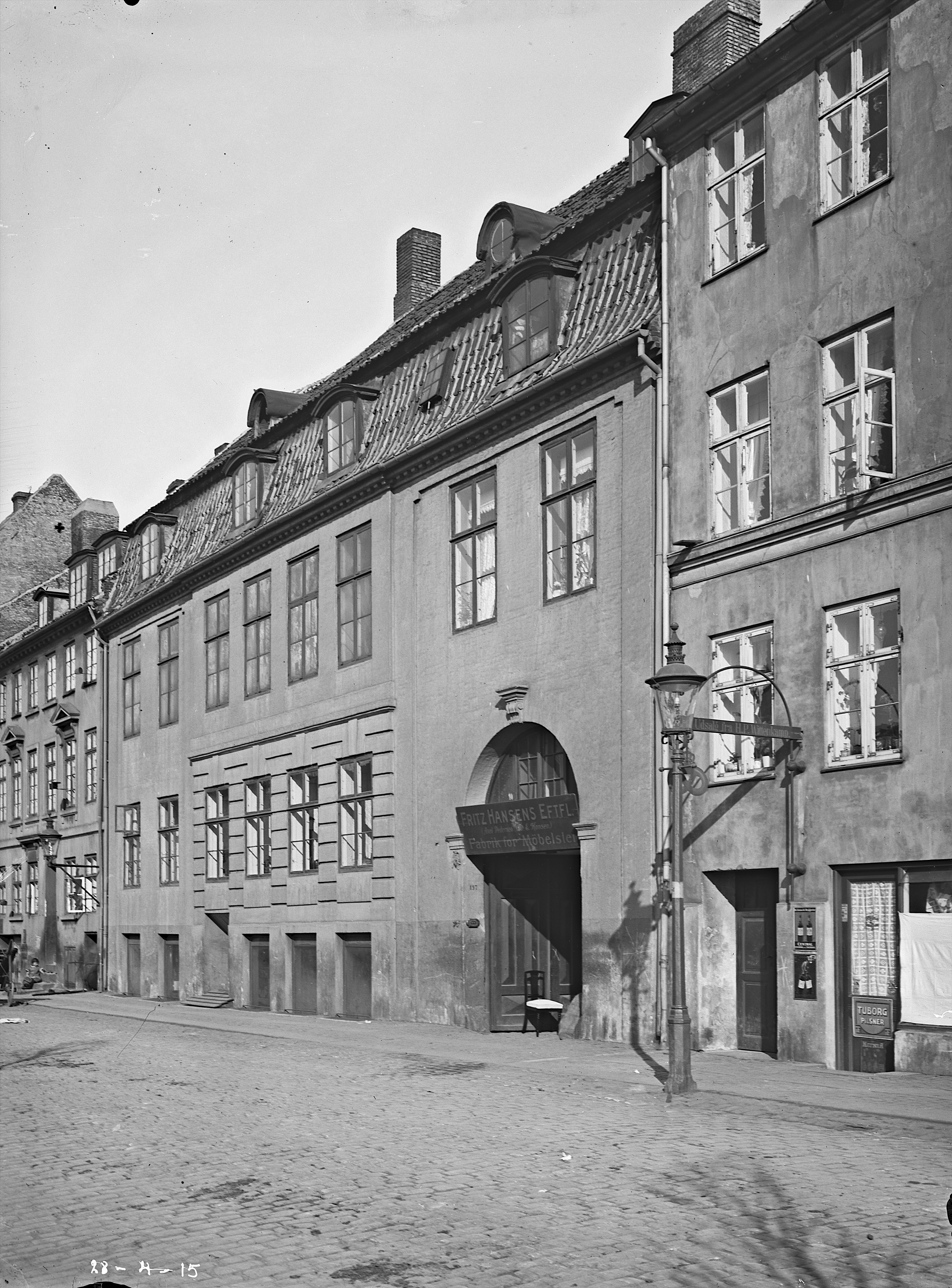
The building in 1915

After the property was acquired by Ulf Brøste (1904–1970), a grocer, he brought his local historic collection of artifacts, images and archeological finds from Christianshavn, and displayed them in the building. Most of the Brøste Collection was later transferred to Frieboeshvile while some artifacts were donated to Christianshavn Local Historic Society and Archives. A statue of Christian IV by William Fredericia used to be seen in a niche in the building but was removed when the company P. Brøste closed in the 1990s and has now been installed in an auditorium at Christianshavn Gymnasium.

== Architecture ==
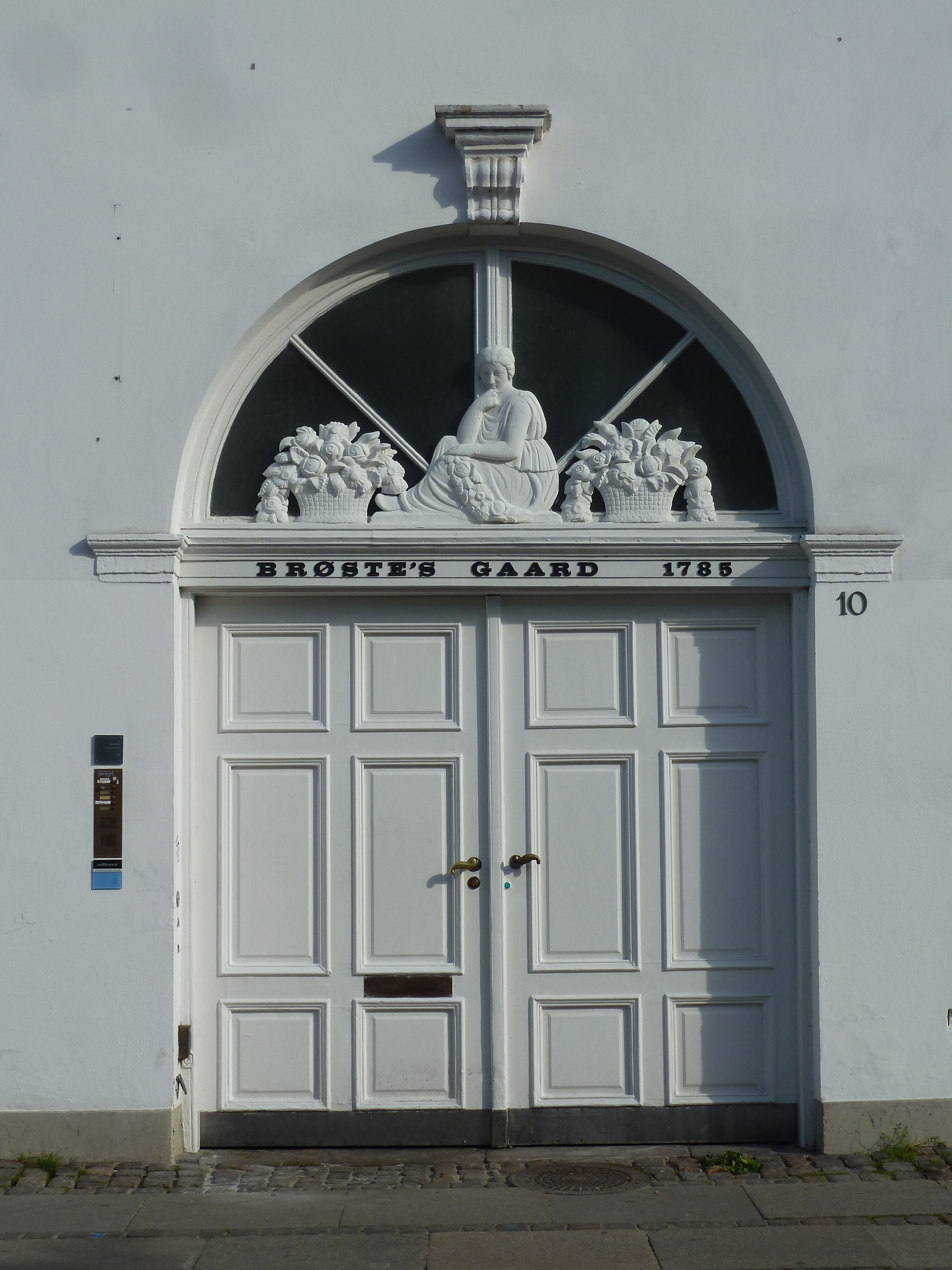
The gate

The Brøste House is designed in the Neoclassical style and consists of eight bays towards the canal under a black mansard roof. It has only seen a few changes but the original gate was replaced in the 1940s. It was listed by the Danish Heritage Agency in 1918.

== Current use ==
The building was modernized and converted into offices by C.W. Obel in the 2000s. In 2011, it was acquired by Barfoed Group, a property investment company based in Odense.

== See also ==
- Heering House
- Steinfass House
