= Thomas Potter (industrialist) =

Scottish-born Danish industrialist and merchant

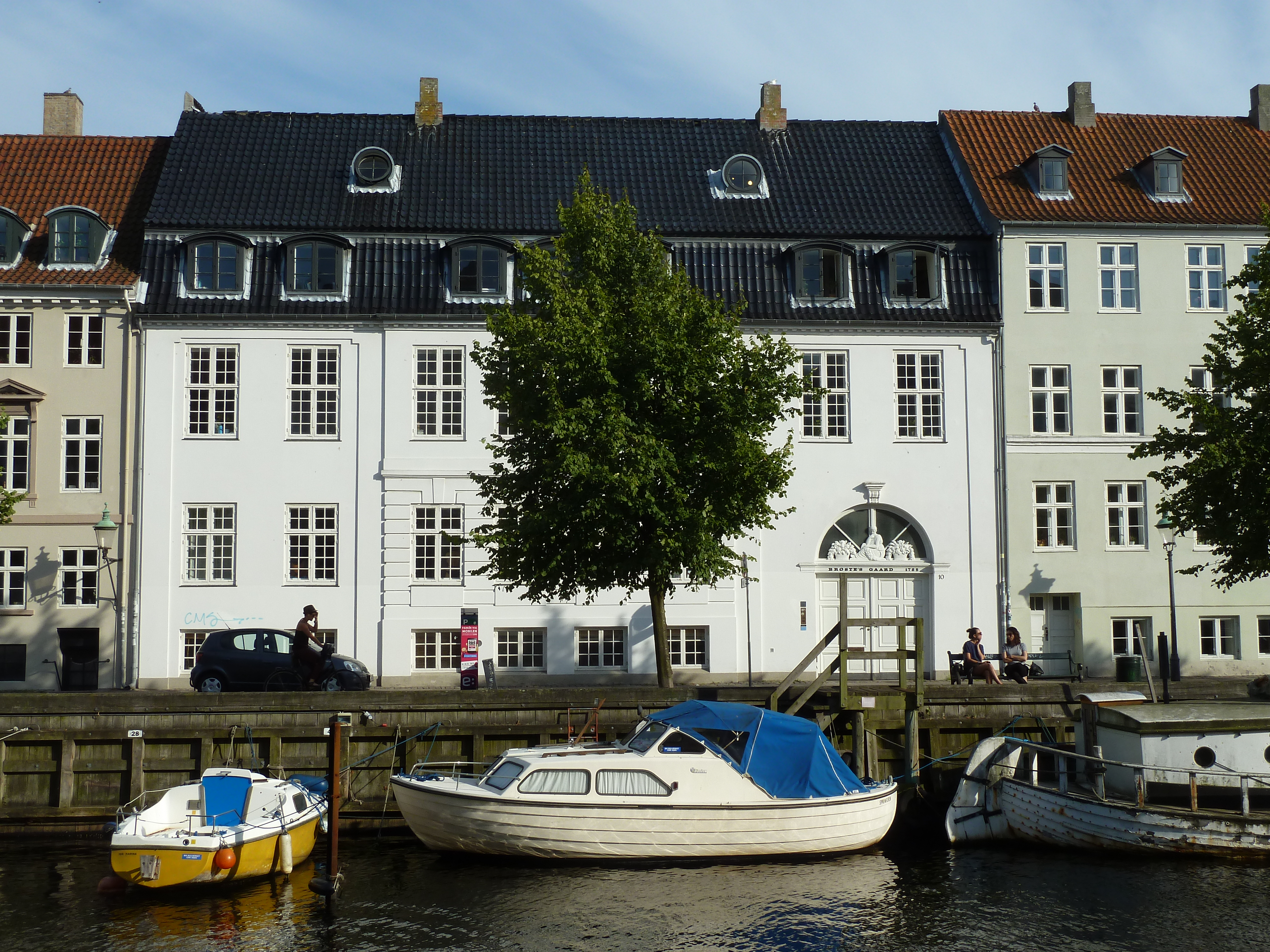
The Potter House in Christianshavn, Copenhagen

Thomas Potter (24 May 1745 – 12 October 1811) was a Scottish-born Danish industrialist and merchant who founded the first iron foundry in Denmark at Christianshavn in Copenhagen in 1785. The Potter House, his former home overlooking Christianshavn Canal in Christianshavn, now also known as the Brøste House after a later owner, is now listed on the Danish registry of protected buildings and places.

== Career ==
Born in Edinburgh to unknown parents, Thomas Potter came to Copenhagen at an early age where he obtained a royal licence to establish an iron foundry on rented land at Appelbys Plads in 1769. In 1771, his license was expanded to comprise all sorts of brass and iron products, forged as well as cast.

In 1779, Potter acquired a lot fronting Christianshavn Canal, constructing the Potter House in 1785. It had offices on the ground floor, packing in the cellar and his residence on the first floor. The foundry was located to the rear of the building. It manufactured "iron pots in all shapes" as well as everything from nails and bullets to ship anchors. Some of its products were exported to both the East and West Indies. Over the years, he built a considerable export of pots, nails and forged anchors to both the East and West Indies.

== Personal life ==
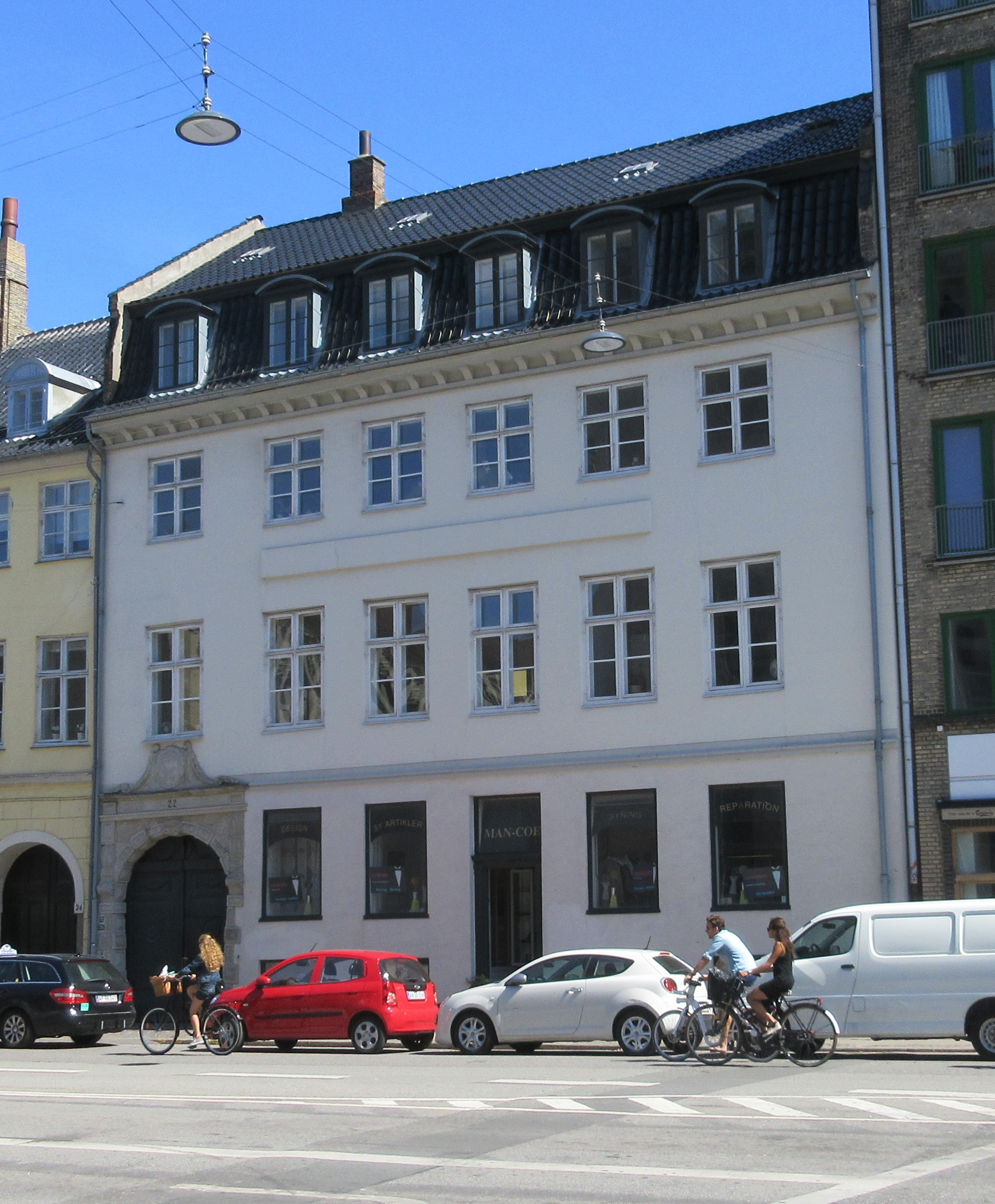
The Cort Adeler House where Potter lived from 1797 to 1807

On 20 March 1782 in the German Reformed Church in Copenhagen, Potter married Marie Spengler (1 January 1762 – 1 September 1785), A daughter of Royal Art Chamber manager Lorenz Spengler and Gertrud Spengler (née Trott), who died just three years later. On 2 March 1789 in St. Nicolas' Church, he then married Inger Marie Wismer (3 August 1768 – 19 March 1789), a daughter of tea and porcelain merchant Nicolaj Henrik Wismer and Anne Marie Meinerth; she died just 17 days later at 20 years old. Haunted by grief after the early loss of two wives in the building in just six years, Potter sold his house at Christianshavn Canal in 1790 never to set foot in the building again.

On 3 May 1794 in the Garrison Church, he married Inger Dorothea Hertz, a daughter of Rotal Forester in Vordingborg County Herman Michelsen H. (1734–75) and writer Birgitte Cathrine Boye (1742–1824). They lived in the Cort Adeler House in Strandgade in Christianshavn from 1797–1807.
