= Christianshavns Kanal =

Canal in Copenhagen, Denmark

Christianshavns Canal
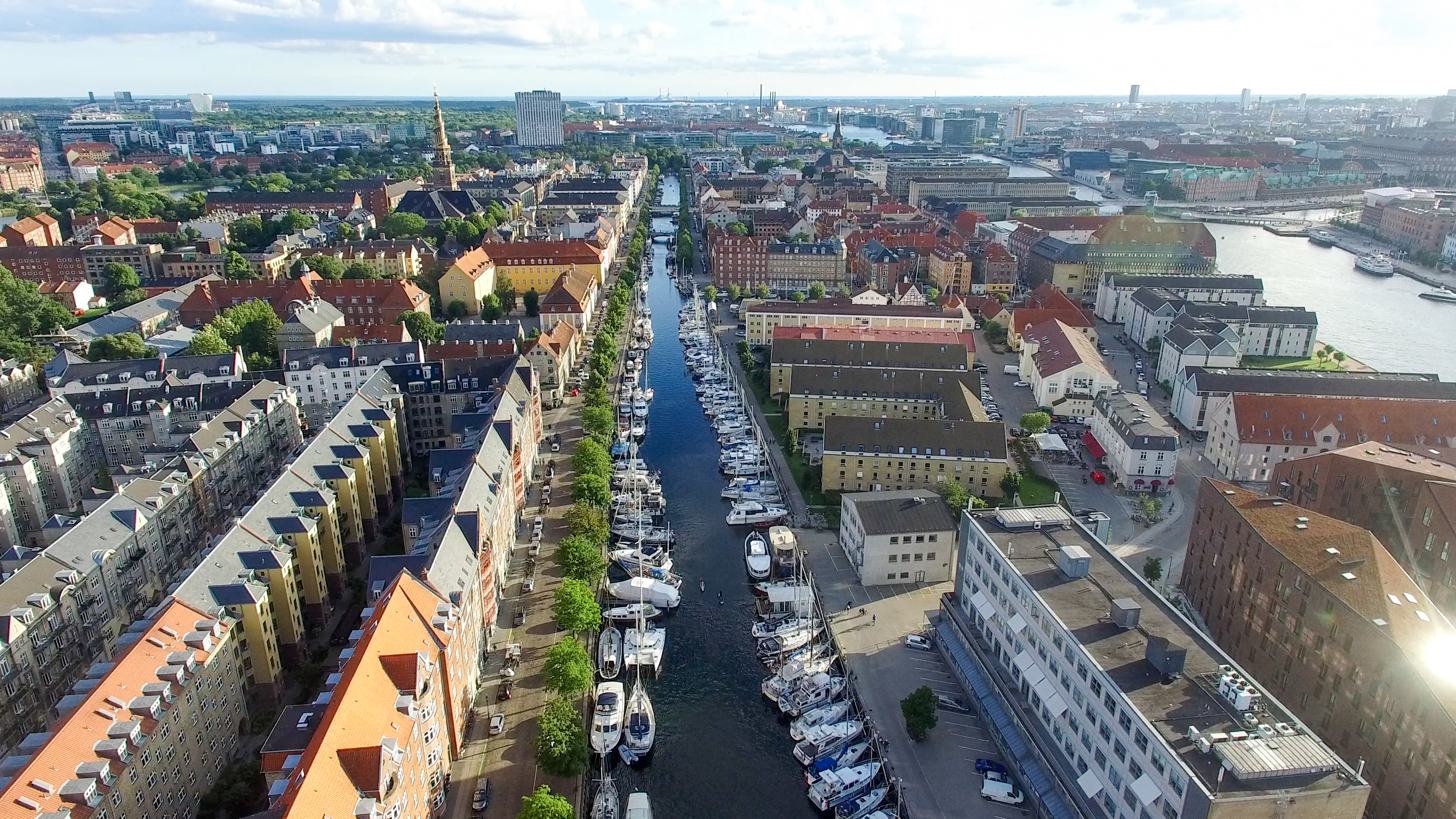
- Aerial view of the canal
- Interactive map of Christianshavns Canal
- Location: Copenhagen, Denmark

Geography
- Beginning coordinates: 55°40′21″N 12°35′02″E
- Ending coordinates: 55°40′39″N 12°35′55″E

Christianshavns Kanal (English: Christianshavn Canal) is a canal in the Christianshavn neighbourhood of Copenhagen, Denmark. Running northeast–southwest, it bisects the neighbourhood along its length. To the north it connects to Trangraven, the canal which separates Christianshavn from Holmen; to the south it makes an angular break and empties in the main harbour a little north of the Langebro bridge. At the middle, Christianshavns Kanal is crossed by Børnehusbroen. This bridge is part of Torvegade, the main thoroughfare of Christianshavn, connecting the city centre across Knippelsbro to the northwest to Amager the southeast. The only other bridge traversing the canal is Snorrebroen, located further north.

Christianshavns Kanal is noted for its bustling sailing community with numerous house- and sailboats, particularly in the northern half of the canal.

== Canal side streets ==
Overgaden oven Vandet and Overgaden neden Vandet are two streets running along each their side of Christianshavns Kanal. Over- in the street names derives from the German word Ufer, meaning shore or bank. "oven vandet" and "neden vandet" refers to the two halves which Christianshavn is cut into by the canal, "neden vandet" being the inner (City Side) side of the neighbourhood and "oven vandet" being the outer (Amager Side) side . The streets date back to the original foundation of Christianshavn by Christian IV.

=== Notable buildings ===
==== Brøstes Samling ====
Brøstes Samling (English: The Brøste Collection), at oven Gade No. 10, is a display on the local history of Christianshavn, founded by wholesaler Ulf Brøste.

The collections are exhibited in a building from 1785, known as Potters Gård (English: Potter's House). It is named for Thomas Potter who was born in Edinburgh, Scotland and arrived in Copenhagen as a young man. He received permission to open a foundry and became a pioneer within his field, producing "iron pots in all shapes" as well as nails, anchors and bullets. Part of his production was exported to the East and West Indies. Devastated by grief after losing two wives, he sold his property in 1790.

==== Søkvæsthuset ====
Søkvæsthuset, at oven Vandet No. 38, was built in 1754 as an orphanage for boys, in 1776 converted into a naval hospital. Since 1989 the side wing has housed the Royal Danish Naval Museum (Danish: Orlogsmuseet).

== Cultural references ==
- Christianshavns Kanal is the last track on Danish band Gasolin's 1973 debut album Værsgo.
- Over gaden under vandet, named after the street that runs along both sides of the canal, is the title of a 2009 drama film directed by Charlotte Sieling.

== See also ==
- Heering House
- Treschows Stiftelse
- Era Ora
- Overgaden Neden Vamdet 8
