= Hans Caspersen House =

Hans Caspersen House (Danish: Hans Caspersens Gård) may refer to

- Overgaden Oven Vandet 50, a building in Copenhagen, Denmark
- Overgaden Neden Vandet 39, a building in Copenhagen, Denmark
- Overgaden Neden Vandet 33, a building in Copenhagen, Denmark
