= Sankt Annæ Gade 4 =

Historic property in Copenhagen, Denmark

Sant Annæ Gade 4
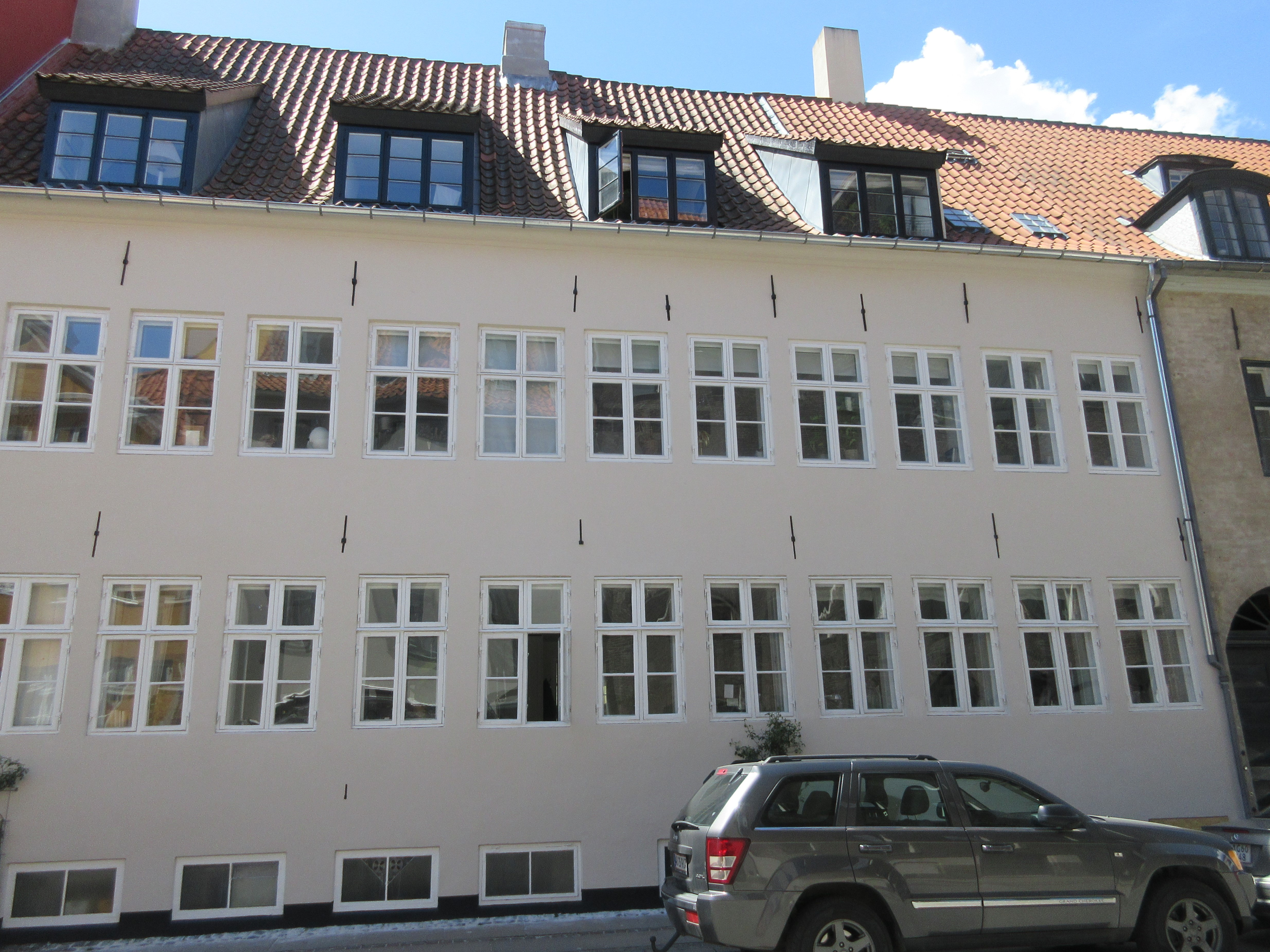
- Interactive map of the Sant Annæ Gade 4 area

General information
- Location: Copenhagen, Denmark
- Coordinates: 55°40′26.76″N 12°35′27.38″E
- Completed: 1624
- Renovated: 1757

Sankt Annæ Gade 4 is a historic property on Sankt Annæ Gade in the Christianshavn neighborhood of Copenhagen, Denmark. Built as a warehouse in the 1620s, in 1757 it was converted into a two-storey residential building by anchor smith Hans Caspersen. The first of a number of construction projects undertaken by Caspersen in the neighborhood, he would later also build or significantly expand the buildings at Overgaden Neden Vandet 39, Overgaden Neden Vandet 33 and Overgaden Oven Vandet 50. The building was listed on the Danish registry of protected buildings and places in 1950.

== History ==
=== Origins ===
The building was originally part of a long warehouse that was associated with the Mikkel Vibehouse at the corner of Strandgade and Sankt Annæ Gade.

=== 18th century ===
The Mikkel Vibe House was from 1736 to 1756 owned by Svend Svendsen, who worked as warehouse manager for the Danish Asiatic Company on the other side of the street.

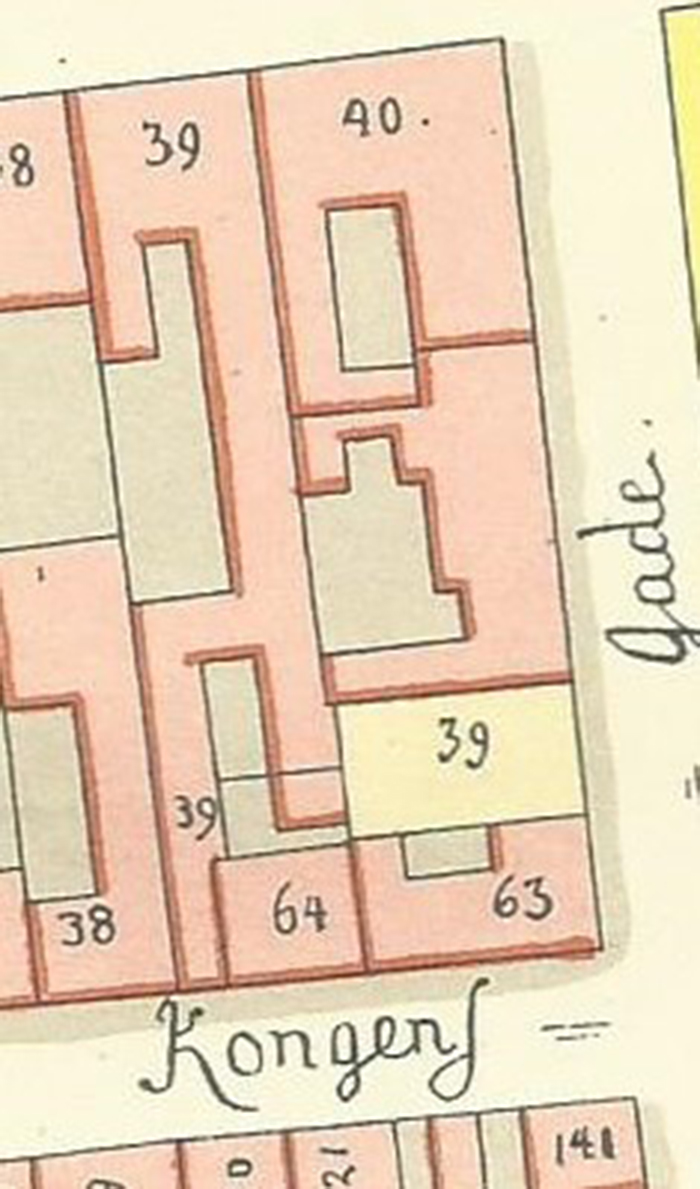
No. 40 seen on a detail from Gedde's map of Christianshavn Quarter. No. 63 is Caspersen's old property and No. 30 is the gatehouse of his new property.

On 18 January 1757, Svendsen sold 12 bays of the 20-bay warehouse to anchor smith Hans Caspersen. Caspersen had for some years been a co-owner of a building at the corner of Sankt Annæ Gade and Wildersgade (then Kongensgade). He immediately embarked on converting his new property into a two-storey residential building. He also constructed a three-storey gatehouse on an adjacent site to the left of the former warehouse. The gateway opened to a yard with a workshop building and a water pump. A side wing with a forge in the ground floor extended from the gatehouse.

In 1760, Caspersen sold the property to blacksmith Friedrich Matthiesen Rom. Caspersen would later engage in a number of other construction projects in the area, including the construction or expansion of Overgaden Neden Vandet 39, Overgaden Neden Vandet 33 and Overgaden Oven Vandet 50.

The following year Sankt Annæ Gade 4 changed hands again when it was sold to distiller Johan Gregersen Flyche. In 1795, the building was sold to manager of Gerup Brickyard Knud Rasmussen Knudsen. On 20 January that same year he sold it to master cooper Mads Christensen Hall (1766–1839).

=== 20th century ===
The building was listed on the Danish registry of protected buildings and places in 1950.

== Architecture ==
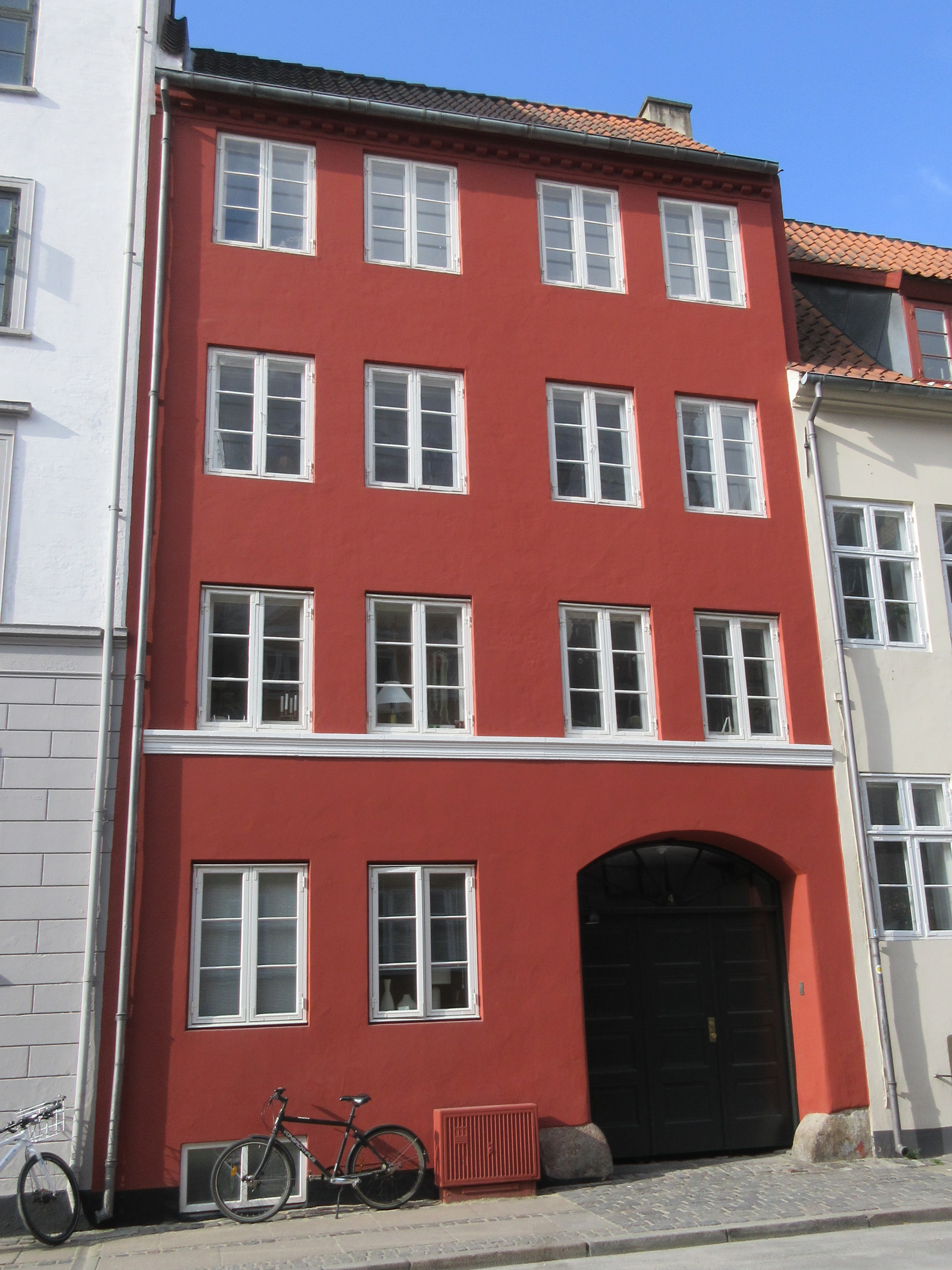
The four-storey gatehouse to the left of the former warehouse

The two-storey former warehouse is a simple, white-painted building with a red tile roof. The facade towards the street is constructed in brick. It features 12 wall anchors and is finished by a white cornice. Cellar entrances are located in the southernmost bay as well as in the third bay from the north. The rear side of the building is constructed with timber framing. It is yellow-washed on the ground floor while the timber framing is exposed on the upper floor.

Caspersen's three-storey gatehouse was heightened with one storey in 1799. The apartments in the former warehouse are accessed through a door in the gateway of the gatehouse. A side wing extends from the rear side of the building.

== List of owners ==
- (1757–1760) Grovsmed Hans Caspersen
- (1760–1761) Grovsmed Friedrich Matthiesen Rom,
- (1761–1767) Brændevinsbrænder Johan Gregersen Flyche, widow Johanne Øland and her second husband Ole Halberg
- (1767–1795) Hjulmand Jens Nielsen Holgreen
- (1795–1685) Teglværksmester Knud Rasmussen Knudsen
- (1795–1842) Bødkermester Mads Christensen Hall, widow Anne Helene Lykke

== See also ==
- Overgaden Neden Vandet 39
