= Jeppe Prætorius =

Danish merchant, slave trader and shipowner (1745–1823)

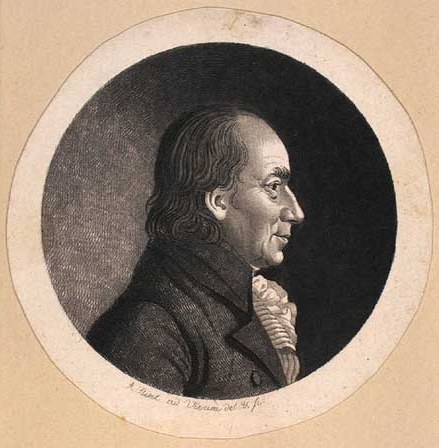
- Engraving by Andreas Flint
- Born: Tønder
- Died: 6 April 1823 (aged 77); Copenhagen, Denmark
- Occupations: Industrialist, merchant, ship owner, ship builder
- Awards: Grand Cross of the Dannebrog

Jeppe Prætorius (4 July 1745 – 6 April 1823) was a Danish merchant, slave trader and shipowner.

== Biography ==
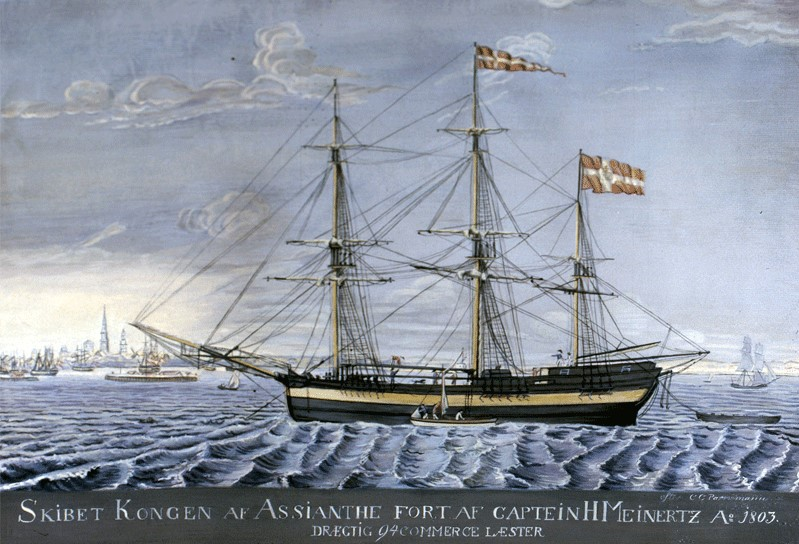
Jeppe Prætorius' slave ship Kongen af Assianthe, 1803

Prætorius was born in Skærbæk near Tønder in Jutland. He moved to Copenhagen where he became bookkeeper for the Danish West India Company in 1796 before establishing his own trading house. He mainly traded on the Danish colonies and was involved in the liquidisation of Østersøiske-Guineiske Selskab in 1787. His fleet had a total ship tonnage of more than 200 kommercelæster (just over 500 t) in 1797. The war with England in 1807 hit his business hard but he managed to keep it afloat. On 31 August 1807 HMS Niobe and Argus captured his ship Kongen af Assianthe (King of Ashanti). Between 1797 and 1 January 1803, when the abolition of Danish participation in the trans-Atlantic slave trade took effect, she had made three voyages carrying slaves from West Africa to the Danish West Indies.

In 1802 Prætorius was elected to a leading post in Grosserer-Societetet, a wholesaler organization.

== Property ==
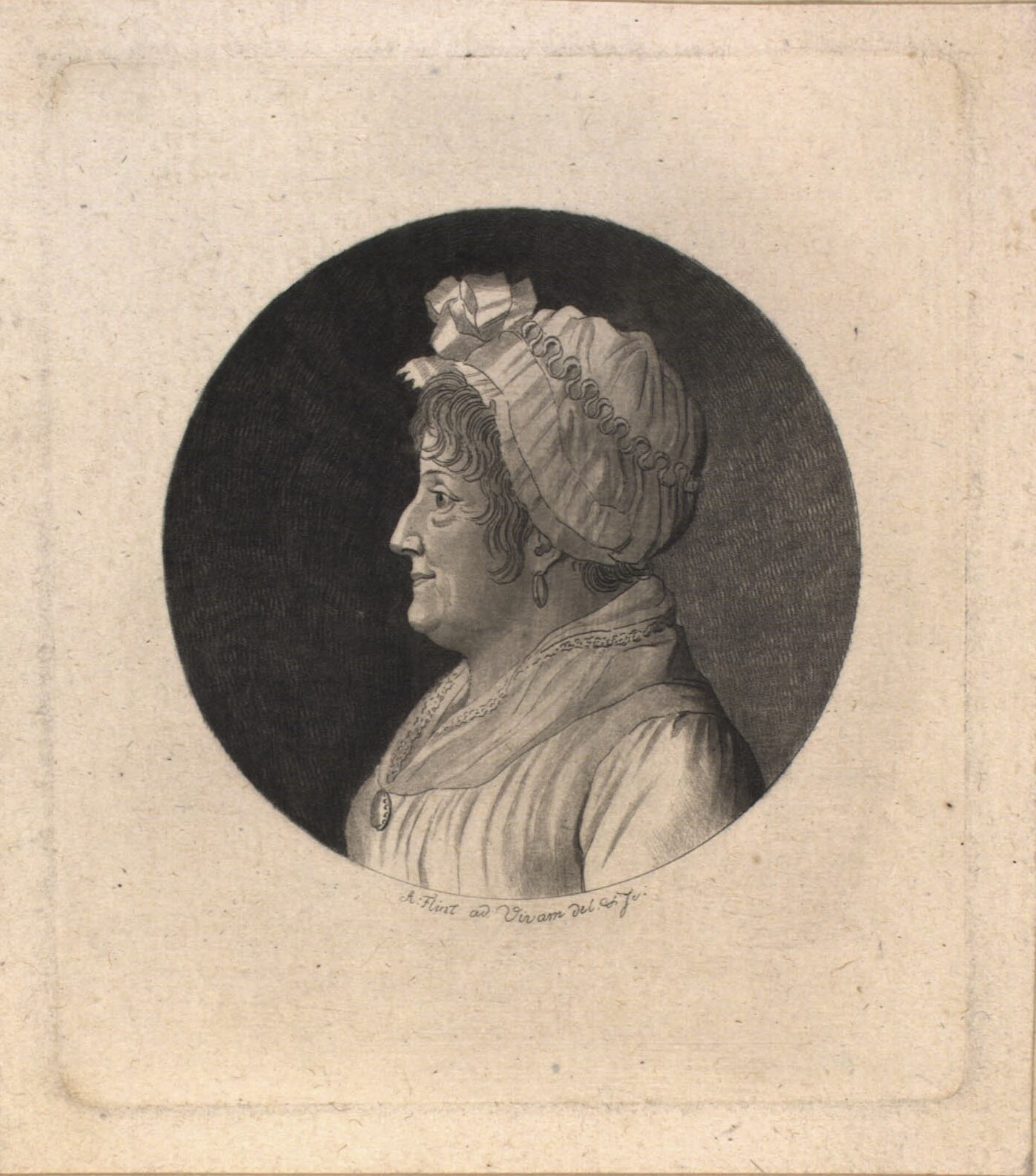
Elisabeth Wilhelmine Prætorius

He purchased the property at Overgaden Neden Vandet 39 in 1792.

== Aftermath ==
Præstotius' two sons, Henrik Frederik Prætorius (30 March 1783 – 24 February 1862) Jacob Christian Prætorius (12 December 1784 – 23 March 1859), took over the company after his death. Henrik Frederik Prætorius was later elected to the board of representatives of Bank of Denmark and served as its bank manager under L. N. Hvidt. He was also a member of the meetings of the estates of the realm in Roskilde in 1838, 1842 and 1844.
