= Mikkel Vibe House =

- Mikkel Vibes Gård
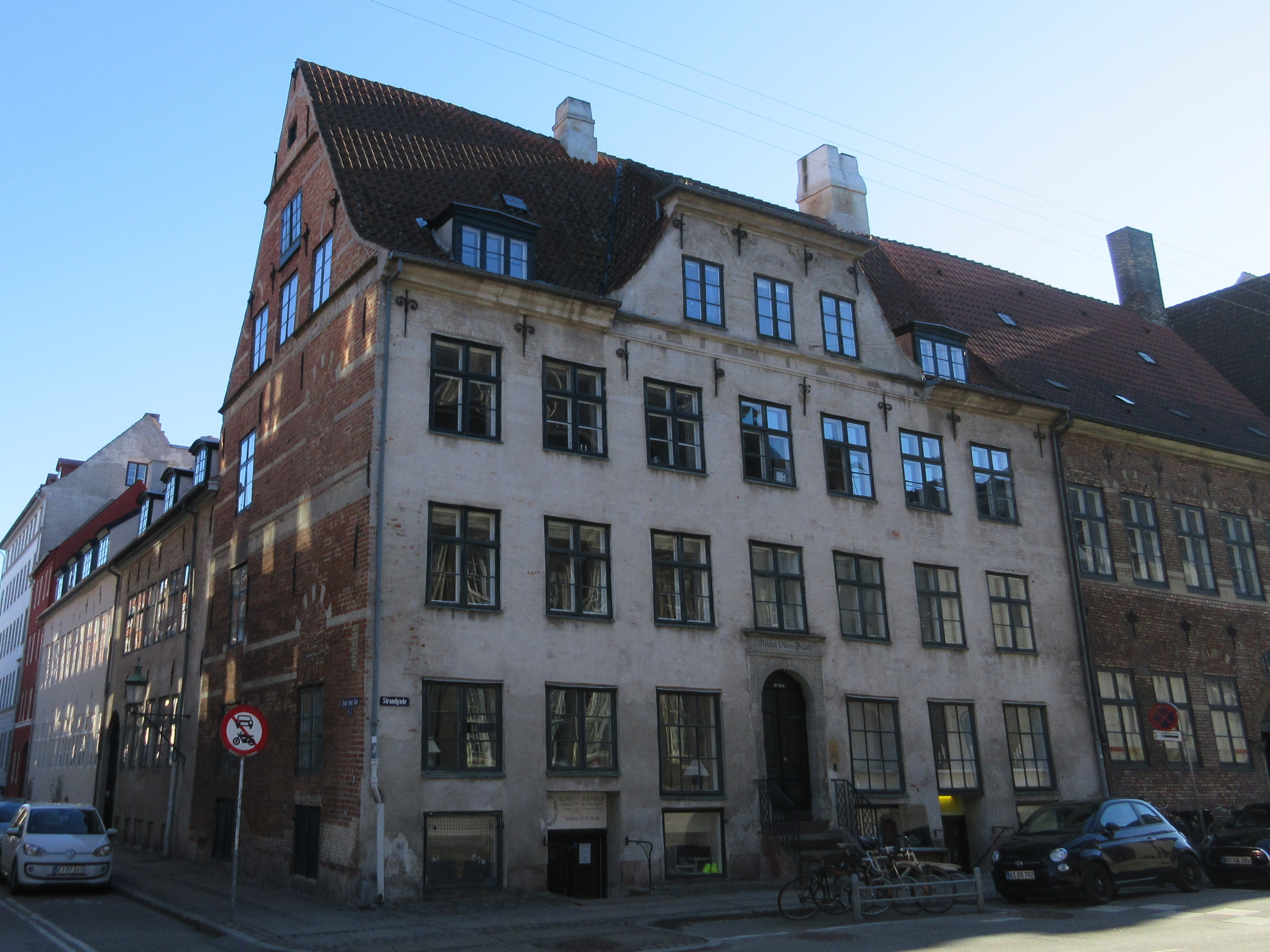
- Interactive map of the Mikkel Vibe House area

General information
- Location: Copenhagen, Denmark
- Coordinates: 55°40′27.42″N 12°35′25.82″E
- Construction started: 1622
- Completed: 1624
- Client: Mikkel Vibe

The Mikkel Vibe House (Danish: Mikkel Vibes Gård) is a historic property located at Strandgade 32 in the Christianshavn neighbourhood of Copenhagen, Denmark. It is believed to be the oldest building in Christianshavn and takes its name after Mikkel Vibe who was mayor of Copenhagen.

== History ==
=== 18th century ===
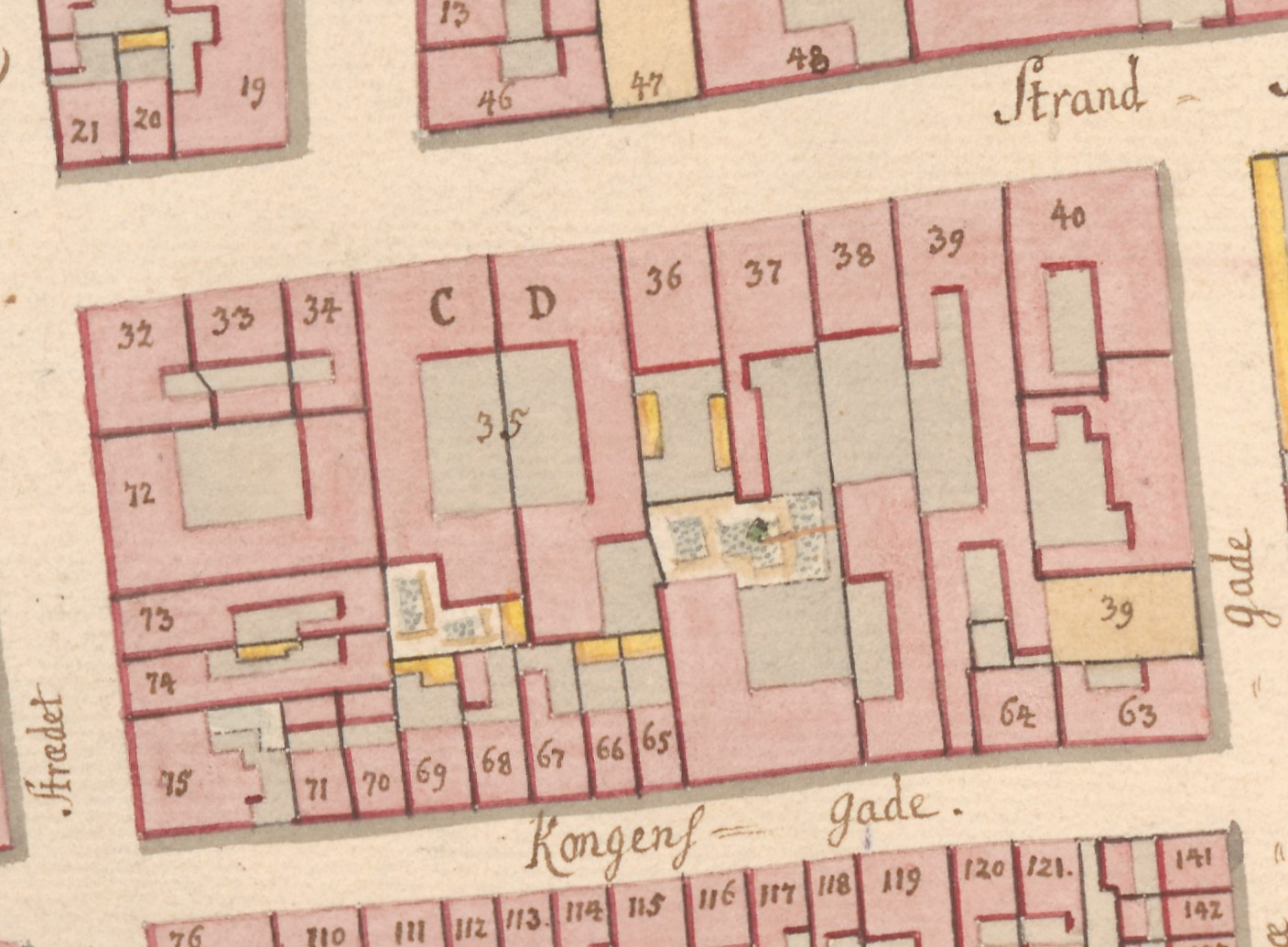
No. 40 seen on a detail from Christian Gedde's map of Christianshavn Quarter, 1757.

The property at the corner of Strandgade and Sankt Annægade was built for merchant and mayor Mikkel Vibe in 1622-24. His lot comprised present-day Strandgade 28-30 as well as a long warehouse along Sankt Annæ Gade (No. 2). The Danish East Indies Company was based in the building from 1697 yo 1732.

The property was listed as No. 23 in Christianshavn Quarter in Copenhagen's first cadastre of 1689. I was the same year acquired by assessor Herman Brechling (1634-1720) and brewer Peder Kloumann (1637-1710). The Danish East Indies Company was based in the building from 1697 to 1732.

In 1736, Strandgade 32 was acquired by Svend Svendsen. He served as equipment mester at Holmen as well manager of the Danish Asiatic Company's warehouses. Svendsen's property was listed as No. 40 in the new cadastre of 1756. On 18 January 1757, Svendsen sold 12 out of 20 bays of the long warehouse in Sankt Annæ gade to blacksmith Hans Caspersen (now Sankt Annæ Gade 4).

The corner property No. 40 was home to 13 residents in two households at the 1787 census. Hendrick Schlegel, a kammerråd and member of kommerskollegiet, resided in the building with his wife Charotina Schlegel, their three children (aged one to five), the 67-year-old widow Amalia Hallested, one female cook, one nanny and one maid. Helena Rosowsky, a manufacturer of clothing (klædefabrikør), resided in the building with her 22-year-old son and business partner Benjamin Rosowsky, one maid and one female cook.

=== 19th century ===
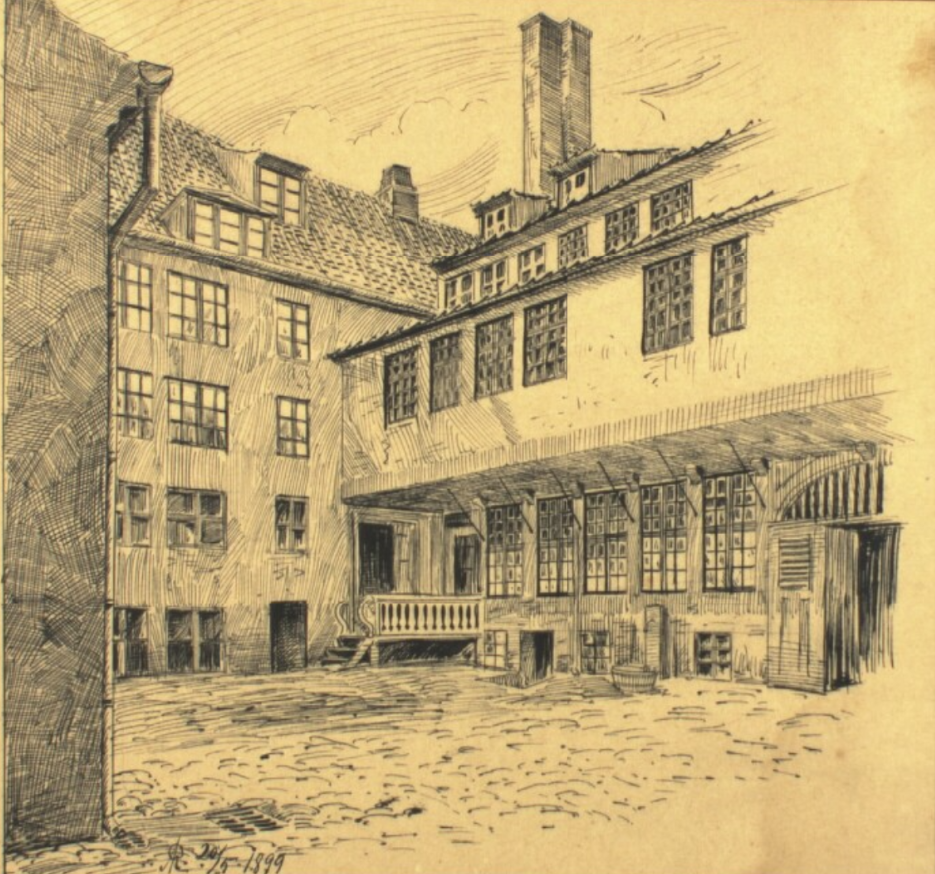
The Mikkel Vibe House in 1899

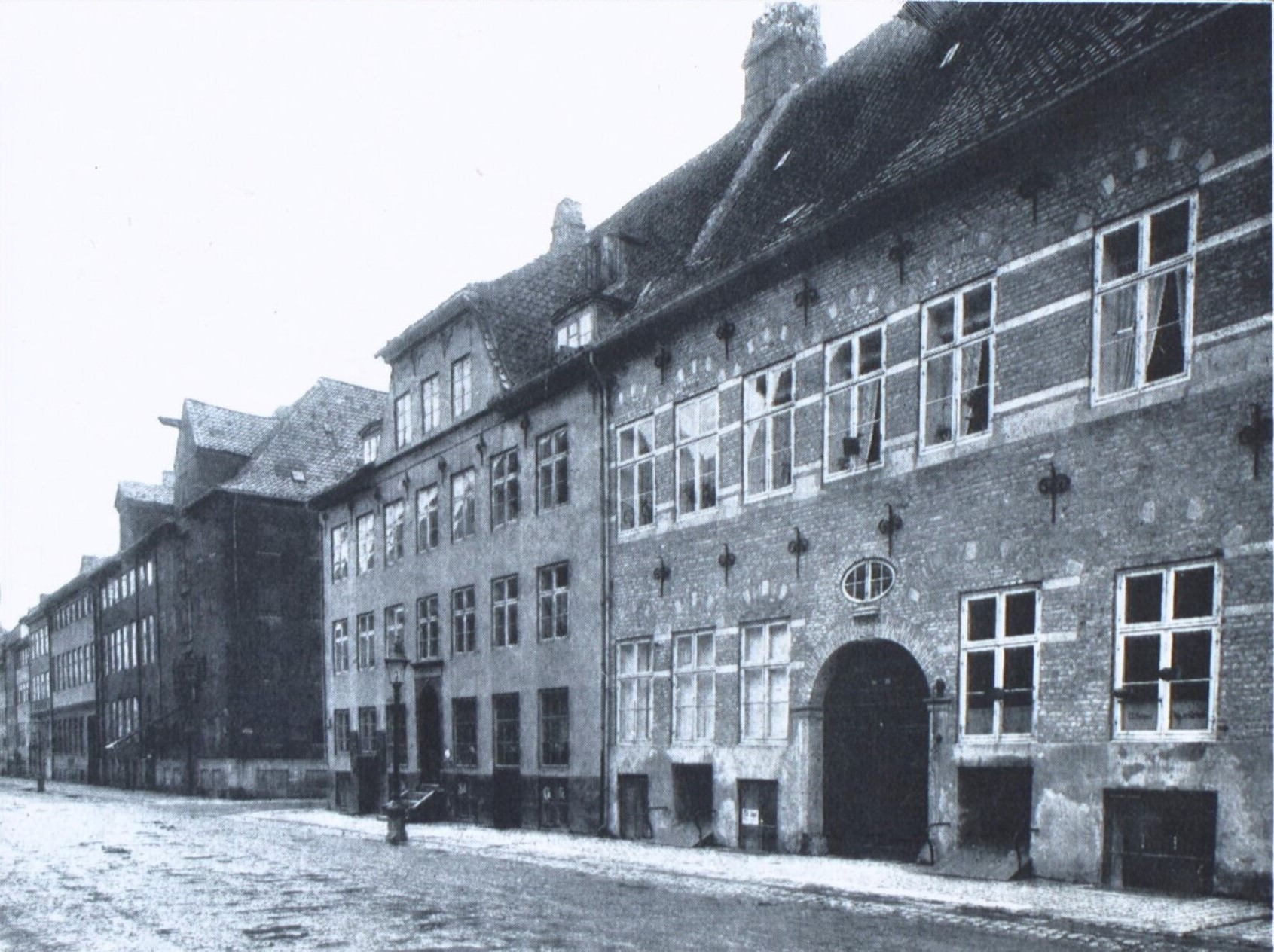
Mikkel Vibe House photographed by Kristgian Hude

The property was home to 53 residents in eight households at the 1801 census. Helena Rosowsky, who had now discontinued her textile business, resided in the building with her son Johan Benjamin Rosowsky and one maid. Peter Otto Bertelsen, a warehouse manager, resided in the building with his wife Caroline Musted, their three children (aged one to five) and three maids. Mads Christian Hall, a master cooper, resided in the building with his wife Karen Cecilie [Hall], their four children (aged one to seven), two coopers, four cooper's apprentices, a female cook, a maid and a nanny. Jacob Jørgensen, a workman, resided in the building with his wife Mette Sophie Jørgensen, their 11-year-old daughter, a five-year-old foster son and one maid. Peter Lund, another workman, resided in the building with his wife Else Frederikke Lund and their four children (aged one to eight). Mads Jensen Holm, another workman, resided in the building with his wife Anne Johanne Holm, their two children (aged eight and 11) and two coopers. Iver Hansen, a cooper, resided in the building with his wife Christiane Dorothea Hansen and their six children (aged one to 12). Peter Boye, a 70-year-old workman, resided in the building with his 29-year-old son Claus Boye (sailmaker).

The property was listed as No. 42 in the new cadastre of 1806. It was at that time owned by block turner (blokdrejer) Peder Simonsen.

The zoologist H. N. Krøyer (1799–1870) resided in the building from 1840 to 1842.

== Architecture ==
The complex consistsog the two wings facing Strandgade and Sankt Annæ Gade as well as a side wing to the south.

== Gallery ==
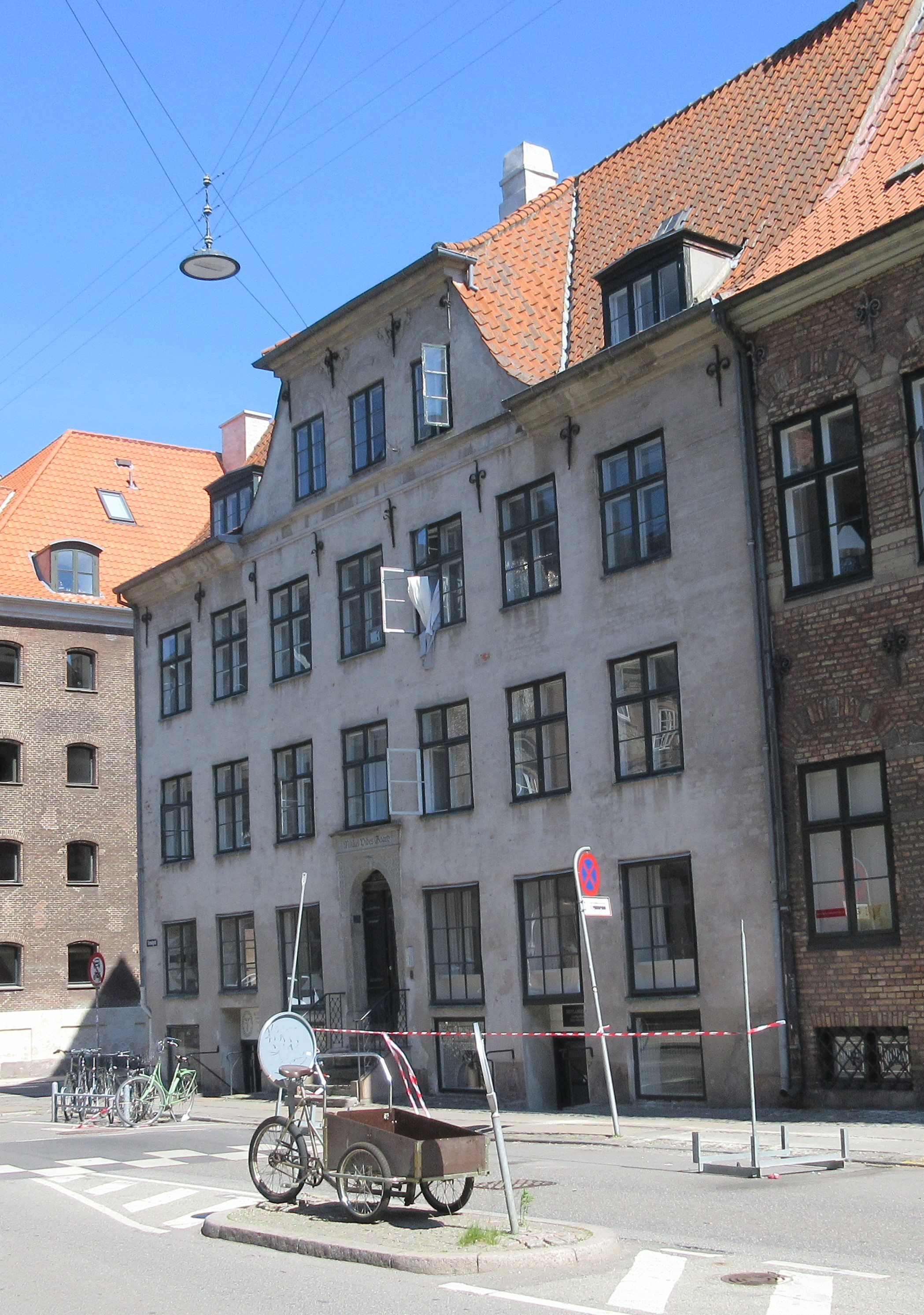
The building seen from Strandgade

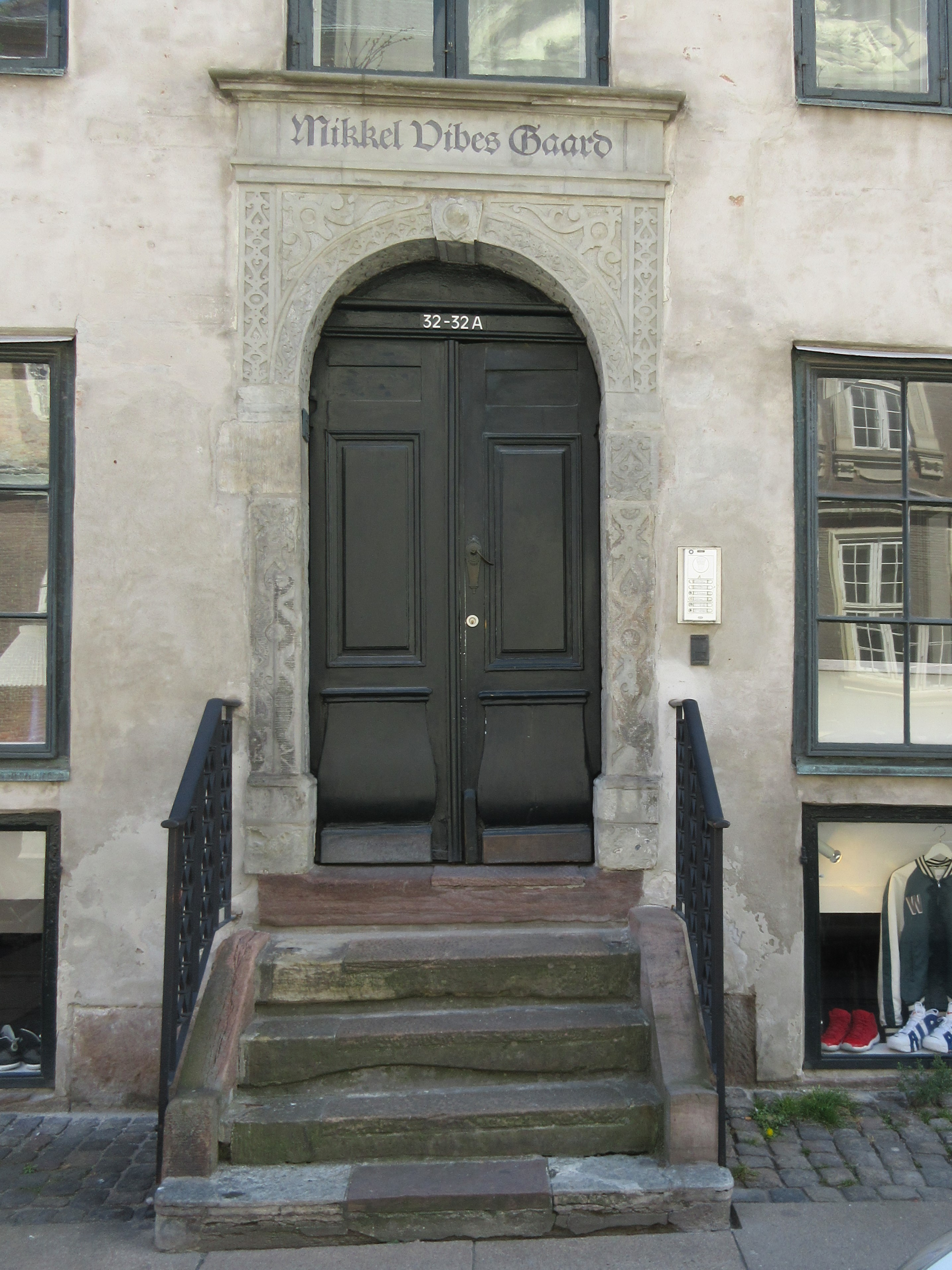
Main entrance
