= Overgaden Neden Vandet 39 =

Historic property in Copenhagen, Denmark

Hans Caspersen House
- Hans Caspersens Gård
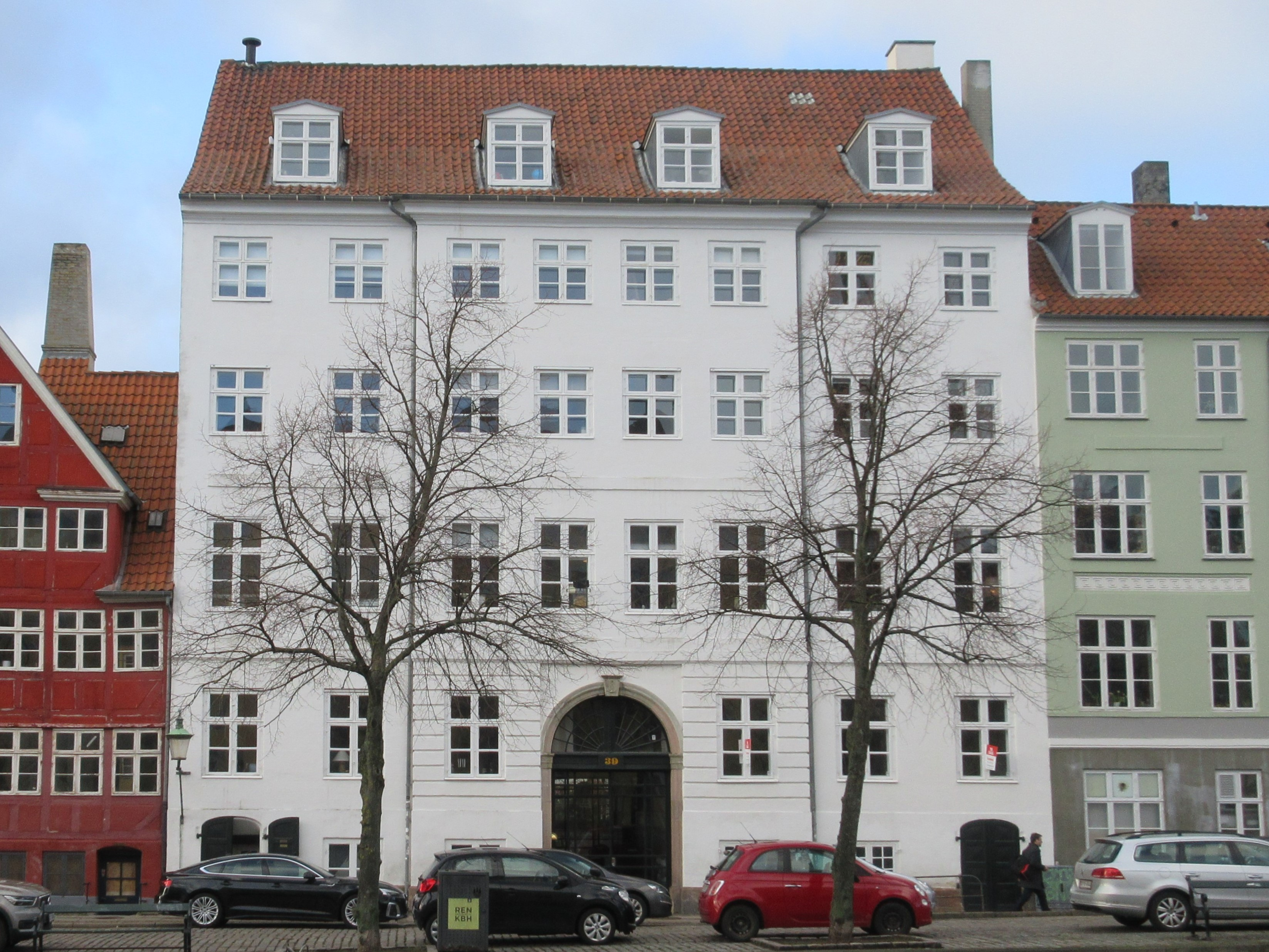
- Interactive map of the Hans Caspersen House area

General information
- Location: Copenhagen, Denmark
- Coordinates: 55°40′24.31″N 12°35′30.34″E
- Completed: 1777

Overgaden Neden Vandet 39, is a historic property in the Christianshavn neighborhood of Copenhagen, Denmark. It is one of three properties along Christianshavn Canal that were built by anchor smith Hans Caspersen and are now all known as the Hans Caspersen House, the others being Overgaden Oven Vandet 50 and Overgaden Neden Vandet 33. The building at Sankt Annæ Gade 4 is also associated with Caspersen. The building was listed on the Danish registry of protected buildings and places in 1918.

== History ==
=== Site history, 1699–1760 ===
The site was originally part of a much larger property which continued all the way to Wildersgade on the other side of the block and Sankt Annæ Gade. On the oldest surviving map of Christianshavn, its owner is indicated as Johan Lauridsen. Before 1675, it had been divided into several smaller properties. A large brewer's house was located at the site where Overgaden Neden Vamdet 39 stands today. The property still continued to Wildersgade on the other side of the block.The property was listed in Copenhagen's first cadastre from 1689 as No. 86 in Christianshavn Quarter,

A free-standing 12 and a half bays long and two storeys tall half-timbered house is mentioned in 1730.

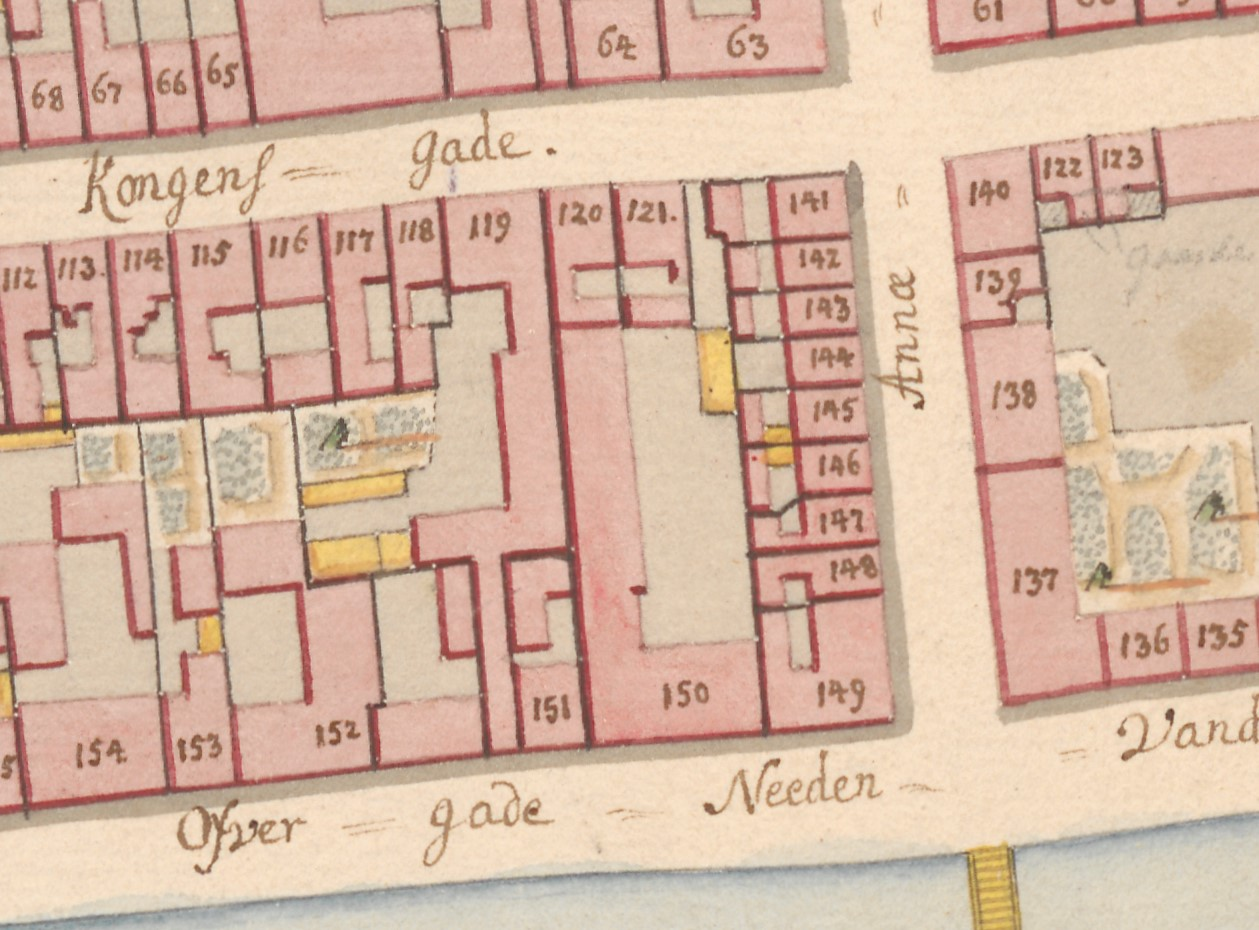
No. 150 seen on a detail from Christian Gedde's map of Christianshavn Quarter, 1757

The property was listed as No. 86 in Christianshavn Quarter in Copenhagen's first cadastre of 1689. It was that same year acquired by brewer Cornelius Nissen, In 1701, it was sold to Friderich Svane, owner of Svenstrup Manor, who later the same year sold it to textile worker Christopher Vogt. Boldewin Depenbrock purchased the property in 1706.

A half-timbered property at the site was in 1730 purchased by dyer Diderich Rohde. It was later sold to dyer Otto Birch. His property was listed as No. 150 in the new cadastre of 1756.

=== Caspersen and the new building ===
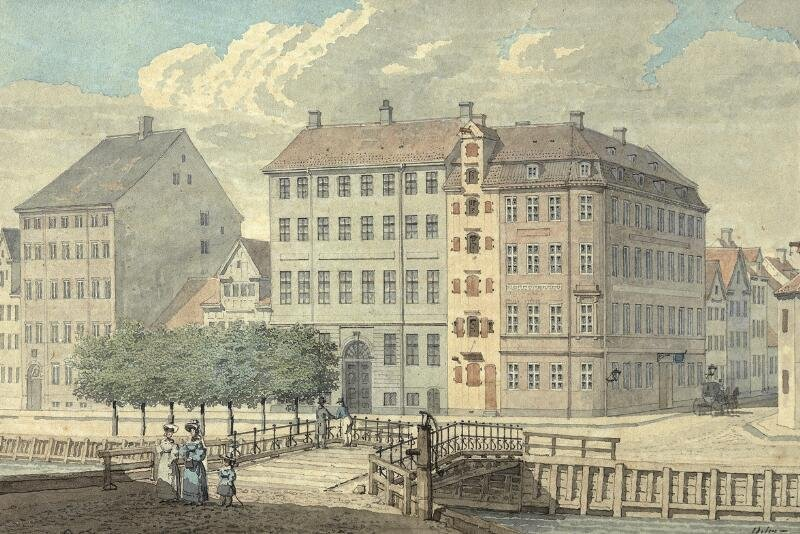
The Hans Caspersen House seen on a drawing by H.G.F. Holm

In 1761 the property was acquired by anchor smith Hans Caspersen. Caspersen replaced the half-timbered facade towards the street with one in brick and reduced the number of windows from 12 to eight larger ones. The building was a few years later hit by fire and demolished. In 1876, Caspersen bought the house at Overgaden Oven Vandet 50 where he would live with his family until circa 1780. HIn 1777, he completed a new four-storey building at Overgaden Neden Vandet 39. It contained eight large apartments, two on each floor.

In 1782, Caspersen bought the property at Overgaden Neden Vandet 33. He remained in one of the apartments at No. 39 until a renovation of his new building at had been completed.

=== Halkier and Prætorius ===
On 2 January 1786, Caspersen sold No. 39 to merchant Peter Halkiær. In 1792, Halkiær sold it to Jeppe Prætorius.

The military officer Jacob Scavenius Fibiger (1793–1861) was a resident in the building in 1860–161. In 1851, he had briefly served as Defence Minister in the 3rd Cabinet of Adam Wilhelm Moltke. The theologian Peter Andreas Fenger (1799–1878), who was pastor at Church of Our Saviour from 1855, lived in the apartment on the first floor from 1873 and until his death.

=== 20th century ===
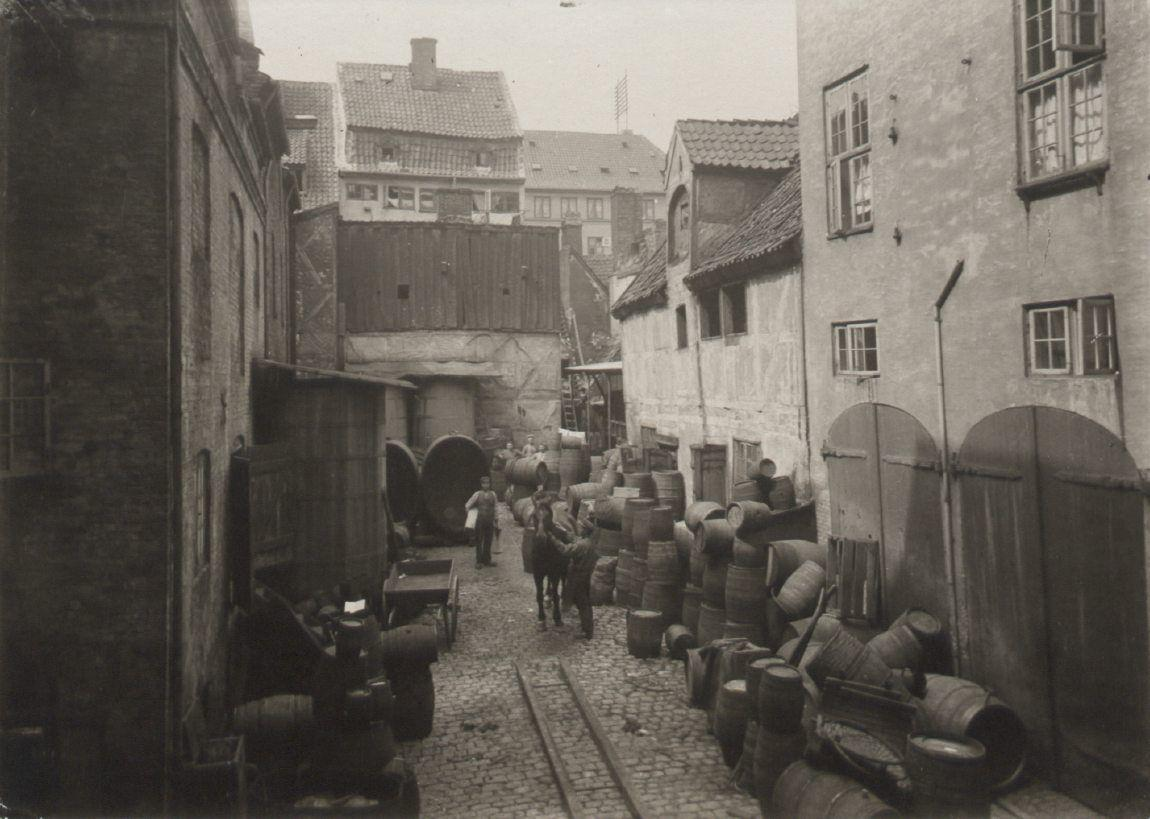
C. Langes Eddikebryggeri photographed by Frederik Riise in 1899

C. Langes Eddikebryggeri, a manufacturer of vinegar, owned the building from at least the 1890s. The company changed its name to De Danske Eddikebryggerier when it relocated to Holger Danskes Vej 104 in 1902.

The property was at some point acquired by Kemisk værk Køge A/S. The company's Copenhagen office was located on the first floor. Axel Bitch operated a ship-chandler's business in the basement.

In 1965-76, Overgaden Neden Vandet 39 was sold as condominiums.

== Architecture ==
The building is eight bays wide and has a four-bay central projection, The gateway is topped by a fanlight and the keystone features a relief of an ancher and the inscription "HCS AMC/150/ ANNO 1777" (HCS = Hans Caspersen Smed/ AMC = Anne Marie Caspersen. 150 = matrikel 150. Anno 1777).

== List of owners ==
- 1689–1701: Cornelius Nissen
- 1701: Friderich Svane
- 1701–1706: Christopher Vogt
- 1706–1730: Johann Boldewin Depenbrock
- 1730–1754: Diderich Rohde
- 1754–1760: Otto Birch
- 1761–1786: Hans Caspersen
- 1786–1792: Peder Halkiær
- 1792–1859: Jeppe Prætorius and heirs
