= Kongen af Assianthe =

Swedish ship

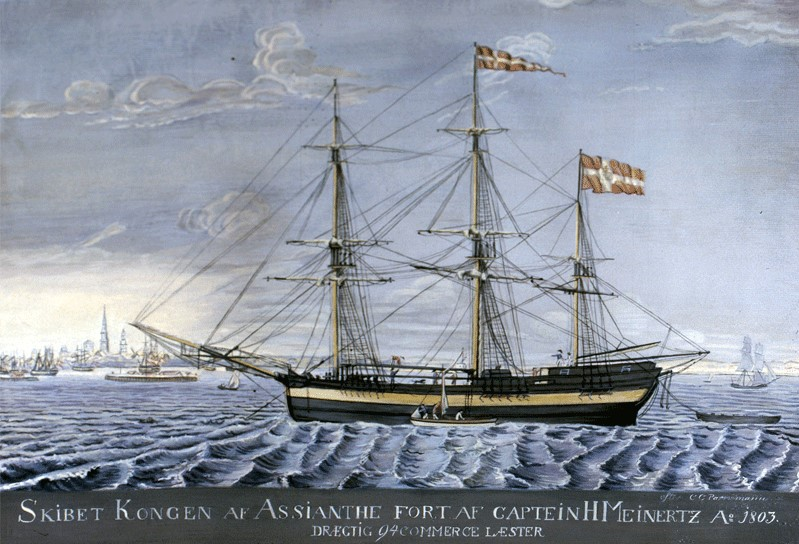
- Kongen af Assianthe, 1803

History

Denmark–Norway
- Namesake: Osei Kwame Panyin
- Builder: Umeå, Sweden
- Launched: 1797
- Captured: 31 August 1807

General characteristics
- Tons burthen: 113, or 220 (bm)
- Complement: 26

Kongen af Assianthe (or Kongen af Assianto) was launched in Sweden in 1797. (Note: Kongen af Assianthe was named for King Qussig, of Assianthe (Ashanti), on the Gold Coast, whom the Danes considered a valuable trading partner.)

Her owners, Jeppe Prætorius & Co. transferred her registry to Copenhagen. Between 1797 and 1803 Kongen af Assianthe made three voyages in the triangular trade between Copenhagen, West Africa, the Danish West Indies, and Copenhagen. That is, she was a slave ship, using her middle deck to carry captives. For Danish vessels, trading African captives was legal until 1 January 1803 when the 1792 law to abolish the enslaving trade came into effect.

== Enslaving voyages ==
The three voyages were:

1st enslaving voyage (1797-1798)
Captain Jens Jørgensen Friis (or Fries) sailed from Copenhagen on 1 November 1798. He arrived at St Croix in December 1798 with 309 captives.

2nd enslaving voyage (1799–1800)
Kongen af Asante sailed from Copenhagen on 31 August 1799. She arrived at St Croix on 17 July 1800.

Captain Peder Madsen (or Matzen). Thomas Fasting, senior Lieutenant and commander of the schooner Iresine (the station ship in the Danish West Indies in 1799 and 1800) returned to Denmark in October 1800 on board Kongen af Ashanti. Another passenger was Frederik Christopher Just Gehardt Trampe. He sailed with the frigate Thetis from Madiera on 17 August 1799 to the Danish West Indies. Promoted to senior Lieutenant on 29 November 1799, he transferred to the schooner Den Aarvaagne when Thetis left that station, but Trampe was ordered back to Denmark on 12 June 1800 by the first available means. On 24 October he departed for Europe on Kongen af Ashanthi.

3rd enslaving voyage (1801-1802)
Captain Heich Meinertz sailed from Copenhagen on 14 November 1801. Kongen af Asante arrived in St Croix in July 1801 with 240 captives.

== Later history ==
Kongen af Assianthe's return in 1803 corresponded with Denmark's ending Danish participation in the trans-Atlantic enslaving trade. This prohibition had been passed in 1792 but did not take effect until 1 January 1803. Thereafter, the ship was sold to a shipping company in Arendal. The most probable candidate was the firm of Anders and Hans Dedekam. They started in Arendal in 1797 and traded in timber. By 1830 they owned a number of vessels.

From November 1804 to June 1807 Kongen af Assianthe was registered at Arendal with U.P. Ugland, master. She apparently regularly sailed beyond Cape Finisterre.

Capture: During the run-up to the Gunboat War HMS Niobe and Argus captured the Danish ship King of Assianthe on 31 August 1807. King of Assianthe, Ugland, master, was sold for £479 10s 10d.
