= HMS Argus (1799) =

Sloop of the Royal Navy

History

France
- Name: Argus
- Builder: Bordeaux
- Launched: 1798
- Captured: 3 April 1799

Great Britain
- Name: HMS Argus
- Acquired: 1799 by purchase of a prize
- Commissioned: June 1803
- Fate: Broken up April 1811

General characteristics
- Tons burthen: 300, or 3263/94 (bm)
- Length: Overall: 102 ft 9 in (31.3 m); Keel: 82 ft 3 1/2 in (25.1 m)
- Beam: 27 ft 3 1/2 in (8.3 m)
- Depth of hold: 13 ft 0 in (4.0 m)
- Complement: Privateer: 90; RN:86
- Armament: Privateer: 18 × 9-pounder guns; RN: 16 × 18-pounder carronades + 2 × 6-pounder chase guns

HMS Argus was launched in 1798 at Bordeaux as Argus. She became a privateer that the British Royal Navy (RN) captured in 1799. She served from April 1803 until she was broken up in April 1811.

== Privateer and capture ==
Argus was a 300-ton (French; "of load") brig or corvette commissioned in Bordeaux in 1798, probably built that same year for Paul Mairac & Sons.

On 10 December 1798, the French privateer Argus brought too Mary, Darby, master, from London to St Vincent's. However the wind was blowing too hard and Argus was unable to board Mary.

On 31 March 1799 at 45°25′N 9°16′W, Pomone recaptured the West Indiaman Minerva of Liverpool, that Argus had captured some 16 days earlier.

On 3 April 1799, HMS Pomone met and captured Argus after a pursuit of 108 miles that hit 12 knots. Argus was only six months old and was pierced for 22 guns, though she carried 18 brass 9-pounders. Prior to her own capture, Argus had captured Minerva and two brigs from Teignmouth whose masters and crews were aboard her. Argus had a crew of 90 men.

Pomone also recaptured, on 9 April, an American schooner that the French privateer Gironde had taken on 1 April. The schooner had been on her way from Caracas to Corunna with a cargo of cocoa and indigo.

== Royal Navy ==
Argus arrived at Plymouth on 4 May 1799 and was laid up. After the resumption of war with France, she underwent fitting between March and July 1803.

Commander Edward King commissioned Argus in June 1803 for the Irish station. She spent her career primarily convoying vessels between Ireland and English ports such as Plymouth and Portsmouth.

On 15 April 1804, she convoyed a number of vessels from Cork to Falmouth. Argus detained Sally, Swazy, master, which had been sailing from Boston to Amsterdam, and sent her into Plymouth.

Commander Edward Kittoe replaced King in May 1804. In October Argus detained and sent into Plymouth Nuestra Senora del Carmen. She had been sailing from Cadiz and she arrived in Plymouth on 29 October.

On 16 February 1805, Argus came across Susan, of Appledore, Pitts, master, about 12 leagues (36 nautical miles (67 km)) south of Cork. There was no one aboard so Argus towed Susan towards Cork. Near the Harbour Rock Susan sank. (Note: Susan, of 141 tons, had been launched in 1802.)

Kittoe left in 1806, and Commander James Stuart assumed command in October.

HMS Niobe, Captain J. W. Loring, and Argus, Commander James Stuart, captured the Danish ship King of Assianthe (Ashanti) on 31 August 1807. (Note: King of Assianthe, Ugland, master, was sold for £479 10s 10d. She was probably the former slave ship Kongen af Assianthe, named for King Qussig, of Assianthe (Ashanti), on the Gold Coast, whom the Danes considered a valuable trading partner. Kongen af Assianthe, of about 220 tons (bm), had been built in Finland and between 1797 and 1803 made three voyages in the triangular trade between Copenhagen, West Africa, the Danish West Indies, and Copenhagen.)

On 20 September, Argus detained Fortuna and on 23 September recaptured Providence. Fortuna, of and from Dram, had been sailing for Clonalky. Argus also detained at Cork Kimro (of Arundahl), Uberant, master, which had been sailing from Youghal to Lisbon. A Spanish privateer of 11 guns and 120 men had captured Providence as Providence was sailing from Galway.

In early 1810, Argus ran down and sank Union, Papler, master at Waterford; the crew was rescued. Union had been sailing from Poole to Waterford.

In April 1810, Commander Joseph Bott replaced Stuart.

== Fate ==
The Navy Board visited the dockyards and prepared a list of vessels that it condemned to be broken up and sold The "Principal Officers and Commissioners of His Majesty's Navy" offered the sloop Argus for sale on 18 October 1810. She apparently did not sell, and instead was broken up at Plymouth in April 1811.
