= Overgaden Oven Vandet 50 =

Building in Copenhagen

Hans Caspersen House
- Hans Caspersens Gård
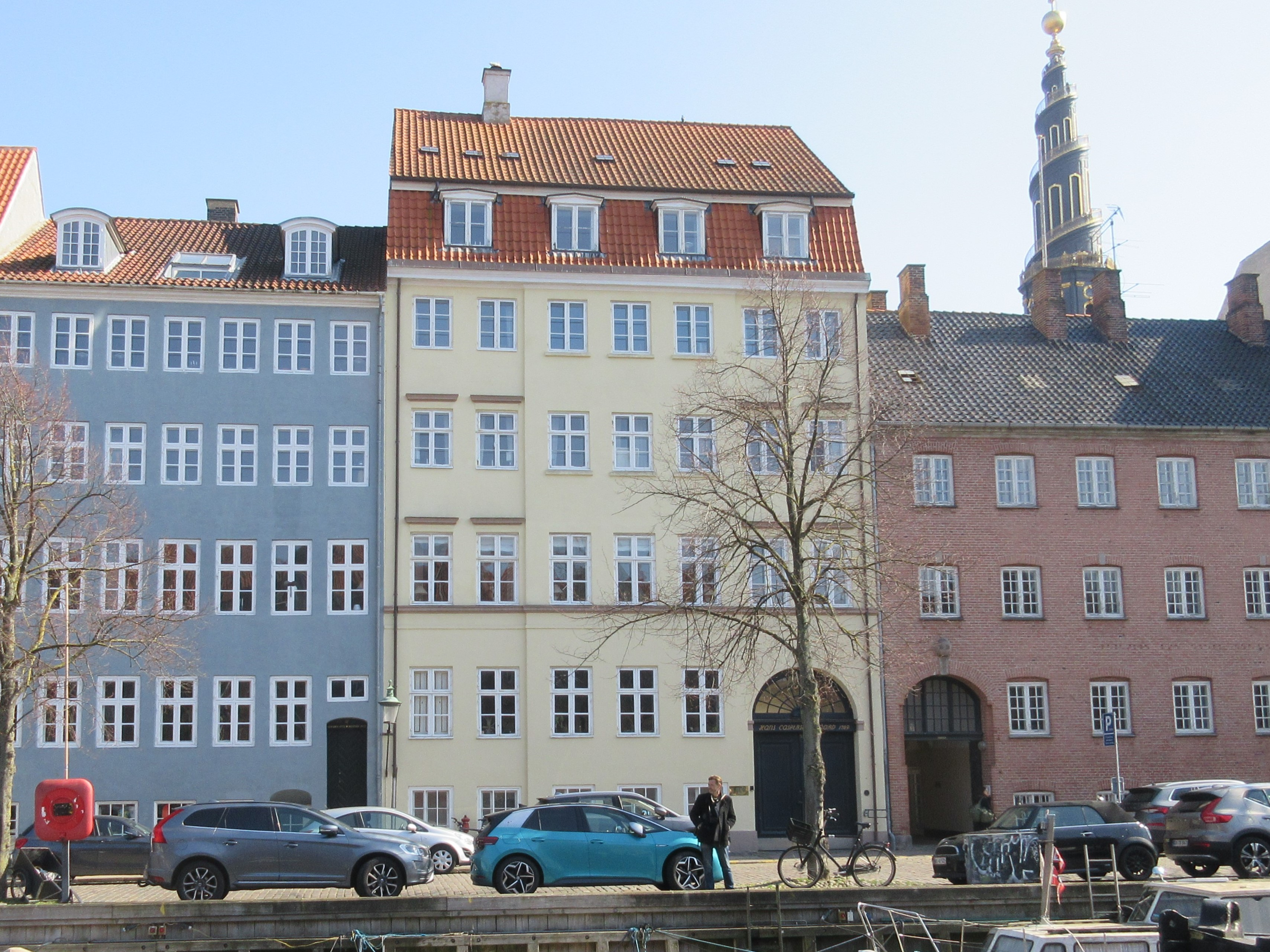
- Interactive map of the Hans Caspersen House area

General information
- Location: Copenhagen, Denmark
- Coordinates: 55°40′25.72″N 12°35′37.1″E
- Completed: 1769

Overgaden Oven Vandet 50 is a residential property in the Christianshavn neighborhood of central Copenhagen, Denmark. It is one of three properties along Christianshavn Canal that were built by anchor smith Hans Caspersen and are now all known as the Hans Caspersen House, the others being Overgaden Neden Vandet 39 and Overgaden Neden Vandet 33. The building was completed in 1769 and listed on the Danish registry of protected buildings and places in 1945.

== History ==
=== Earlier building ===
The property on the site was listed as No. 97 in Christianshavn Quarter in Copenhagen's first cadastre of 1689. It was at that time owned by ropemaker Verner Wesenduncks (Wesendonch). His house was located in Dronningensgade on the other side of the block. The lot was in 1718 acquired by timber merchant Niels Flesborg (c. 1695-1720s) and used as a lumberyard. The lumberyard was in 1720 ceded to timber merchant and captain Hans Brechvoldt. He had just married Flesborg 's daughter Martha. Brechvoldt and a brother-in-law died in 1744, probably from drowning, leaving Martha Nielsdatter Flesborg Brechtwoldt as the owner of the lumberyard. In 1749, she sold the property to brewer Peder Nielsen Trye (Trie) Friis. Friis' property was listed as No. 177 in the new cadastre of 1756.

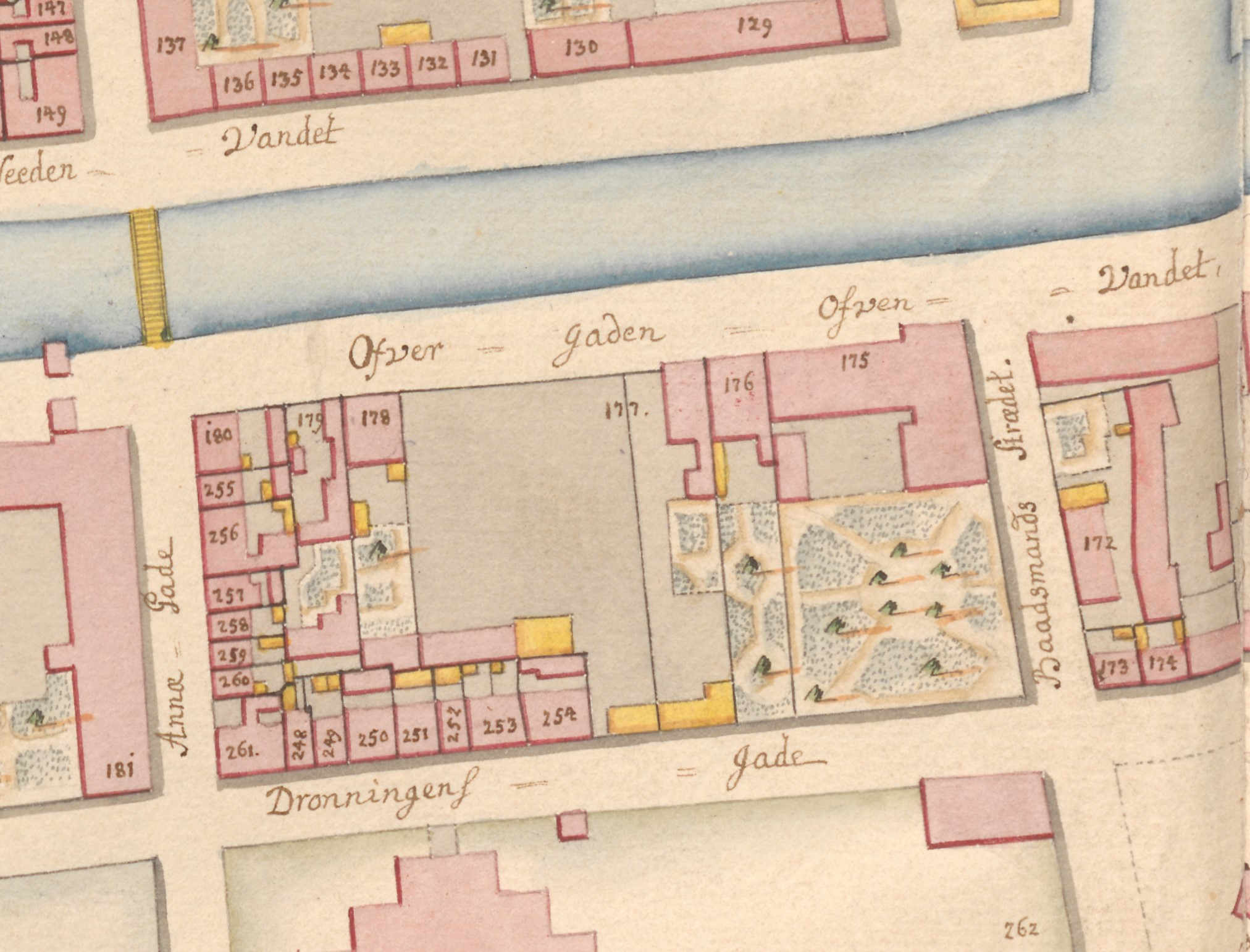
No. 177 seen on a detail from Christian Gedde's map of Christianshavn Quarter, 1757.

On 31 July 1755, Friis' property was sold at auction to John Brown for 4,241 rigsdaler. Brown was only interested in suitable storage facilities for his wholesale business. On 22 December he therefore sold the western part of the property with the residential building (later referred to as No. 177A) to dyer Andreas Hegelund for 2,500 rigsdaler. The rest of the transaction was financed through a loan from Brown's father-in-law Peter Appleby.

Hegelund's house is in a fire insurance policy from January 1756 described as a two-storey, timber-framed building constructed on a brick cellar. It was via a staircase in oak timber attached to a three-bays-long and three-storeys-tall side wing with kitchen and workshop. A combined wagonhouse and stable with room for three horses was situated on the rear of the property towards Dronningensgade. Andreas Hegelund's widow Elisabeth Sophie married Gottfried August Neukammer.

=== Hans Caspersen and the new building ===
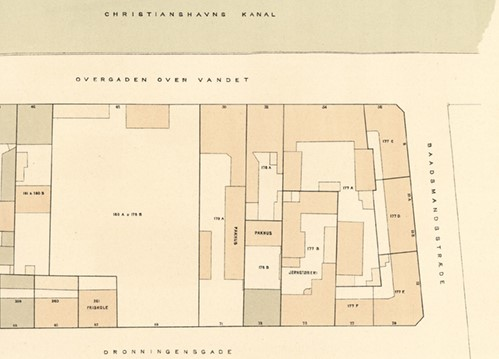
Caspersen's property seen on a district plan from 1886. The empty lot to its left was a few years later used for the construction of Bombebøssen, a charity for old seamen formerly located at Nikolajgade 20 on the other side of the harbour.

On 25 June 1765, Neukammer sold the property to anchor smith Hans Caspersen. Caspersen's old property at Overgaden Neden Vandet 39 had recently been destroyed by fire. He demolished the existing buildings and constructed a new four-storey apartment building on the land in the 1760s.

Hans Caspersen sold the property to Oluf Munch shortly after its completion but seems to have kept an apartment in the building. He lived there until 1782 when he returned to his other property at Overgaden Neden Vandet 39.

=== Bishop and Malcolm and Ogilvie ===
In 1778, Overgaden Oven Vandet 50 was sold to the Scottish ship captain Arthur Bishop (c. 1742). He had acquired citizenship in Copenhagen in 1771. In the same year, he captained the frigate Minerva on a voyage to the Danish West Indies. In 1782, he captained Cronborg on a voyage to Tranquebar. He was married to Alison Bishop. After his death, she married secondly to Alexander Malcolm, a sailing master born at Kirkcaldy, Scotland. He died no later than 1801.

Alison Malcolm had two children by her first husband. The son James Bishop (c. 1782–1819) passed his navigational exams in the early 1800s. He captained a number of privateering vessels during the Gunboat War. The daughter Mary Ann (Mariane) Bisho married ship captain James Ogilvie (1762–1825). He was born on Saint Croix in the Danish West Indies to a Scottish father and a Danish mother. He was sent to Scotland to receive a commercial education. He moved to Copenhagen after his father's death where he was employed by Charles August Selby. In 1789 he served as 1st mate on board the frigate Mette Marie (owned by van Hemmert and Partners) on a voyage to the Danish West Indies. In 1794–95 he served as captain of Anna og Lowisa (owned by Selby) on another voyage to the Danish West Indies. In 1798 he served as captain of NØJSOMHED on a third expedition to the Danish West Indies. In 1800–1801, he was captain of Stærke Odde.

Alison Malcolm's property was home to 13 residents in four households at the 1801 census. Malcholm resided in the building with one maid. James Ogilvie and Mariane Bishop resided in another apartment with their one-year-old son James Ogilvie and one maid. Rasmus Fenger, pastor of the Church of Our Saviour, resided in the building with his wife Marthe Helene Meinertz, their two children (aged two and four), a wet nurse and a maid. The last resident, Ole Hansen Dam, a workman, resided in the building alone.

Alison Malcholm's property was listed in the new cadastre of 1806 as No. 179 in Christianshavn Quarter.

In 1801–1803 and again in 1804–1806, Ogilvie served as captain of København (owned by Dunxfelt) on two voyages to India. In India he made a fortune on private trade. In 1807, he was supposed to captain København on a third expedition to India but it was obstructed by the war with England.He subsequently bought Neppegård at Hørsholm where he then lived with his family until 1815. In 1817, he captained Maria on a voyage to India. He died on another expedition to India in 1825. His son James (1800–1846) worked for a trading house in Calcutta where he died from cholera. His som George (1801–1809) was a general trader in India and China.

=== Lauritz Nicolai Hvidt], 1811–52 ===
In 1811, Lauritz Nicolai Hvidt purchased the property. He kept it until 1852. In 1812, he also purchased the property at Kronprinsessegade 28 and lived there until his death. He did this not himself live in the building in Christianshavn.

The property was home to three households at the 1840 census. Niels Severin Müller (b. 1776), a merchant (grosserer), resided on the ground floor with his wife Marie K. Poulsen and one maid. Dorothea Catharina Olsen, widow of a distiller, resided on the second floor with her daughter Oline Charlotte Cecilia Olsen, governess Clara Theodora Hansen Gjersing (in wine merchant Hansen's household) and one maid. Frederik Wind Schneider, a book printer, resided on the third floor with his wife Karen Elisabeth /née Kofoed) and one maid.

The jurist and author Hans Egede Schack (1820–1859) was a resident in the building in 1845. He was a member of Folketinget in 1850–1853 and would later serve as secretary for the prime ministers P. G. Bang (1797–1861), C. G. Andræ (1812–1893), and C. C. Hall (1812–1888). He published the novel Fantasterne in December 1857.

=== Olsen family, 1850s–1880s ===
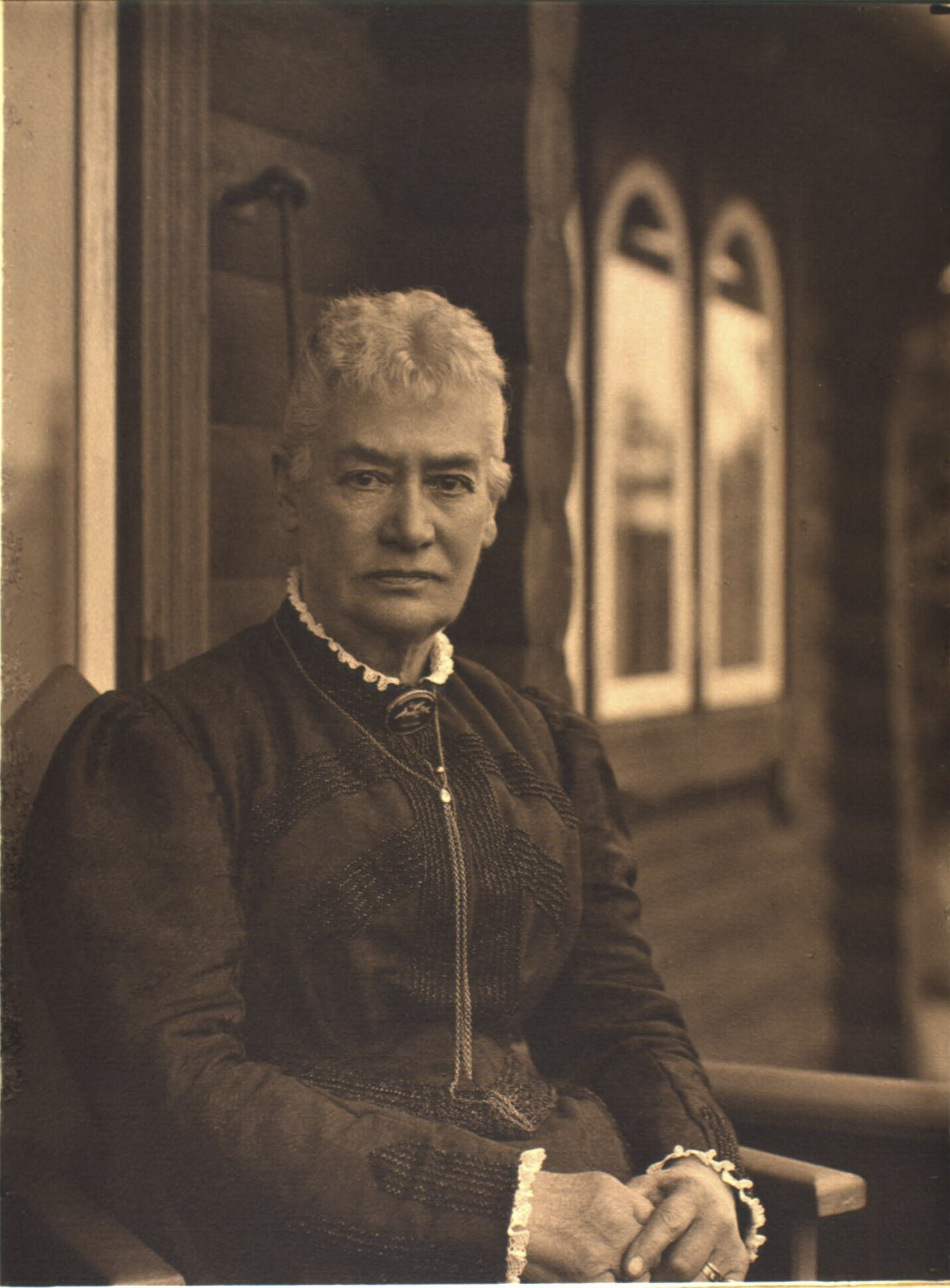
Thora Mathilde Olsen, née Seehusen.

The property was later acquired by oil miller Peter Christian Olsen (1808–1872). In 1847, he had established an oil mill in Torvegade (No. 51, demolished). His property was home to 31 residents at the 1860 census. Olsen resided on the two lower floors with his wife Ane Maren Aceline /née Giessing), their three sons (aged 18 to 27), a housekeeper and a maid. Niels Peter Carl Theodor Bruus, a military officer with rank of captain, resided on the second floor with his wife Cathrine Christine (née Stochfledt) and one maid. Frederik Seehusen, a master joiner, resided on the third floor with his wife Laura Thomine Henriette (née Jørgensen), their seven children (aged six to 28), one maid and two joiner's apprentices. Werdech Hagemann, a seaman, resided in the basement with his wife Emma Rasmine (née Petersen), their five children aged one to six), his father-in-law Andreas Petersen and the father-in-law's wife Mette Petersen (née Sørensen).

The property and oil mill in Torvegade were after Peter Christian Olsen passed to his widow. In 1867, she ceded the oil mill to her son Alfred Olsen (1843-1900). He had married Thora Seehusen, daughter of master joiner Frederik Seehusen on the third floor (cf. the 1860 census).

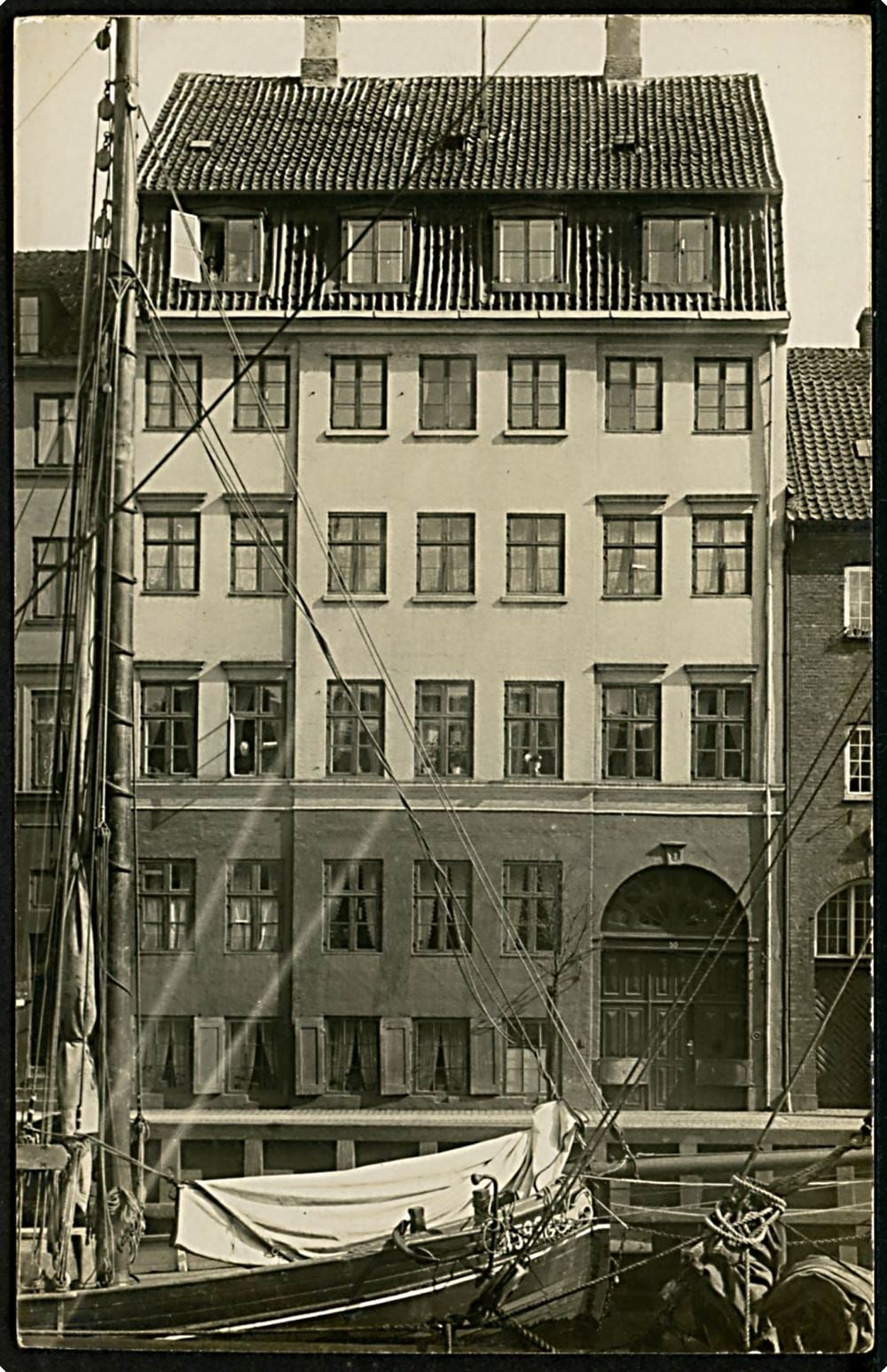
Overgaden Oven Vandet 50.

The property was home to a total of 22 residents in five households at the 1880 census. Ane Marie Axeline Olsen resided on the two lower floors with her son Morten Olsen (farmer) and two granddaughters (aged 13 and 17), a housekeeper and a maid. Alfred Olsen resided on the second floor with his wife Thora Mathilde (née Seehusen) and one maid. Frederik Nielsen, a professor of church history and later Bishop of Aalborg, resided on the third floor with his wife Katrine Marie Magdalene Nielsen (née Groth) and one maid. Laurine Cathrine Brorson (née Velschowm 1796–1884), widow of merchant (hørkræmmer) Johannes Massenius Brorson (1802–1871), resided on the fourth floor with four of her children (aged 31 to 48) and one maid. Niels Andreas Olsen, a retailer, resided in the basement with his wife Johanne Ariane Marie Olsen (née Nissen), their daughter Henriette Christine Schmidt (née Olsen) and their son Christian Theobald Olsen.

=== 20th century ===
The property belonged to etatsrådinde T M Olsen. Other residents included business executive Steffen Berg and lawyer H Mollerup.

== Architecture ==
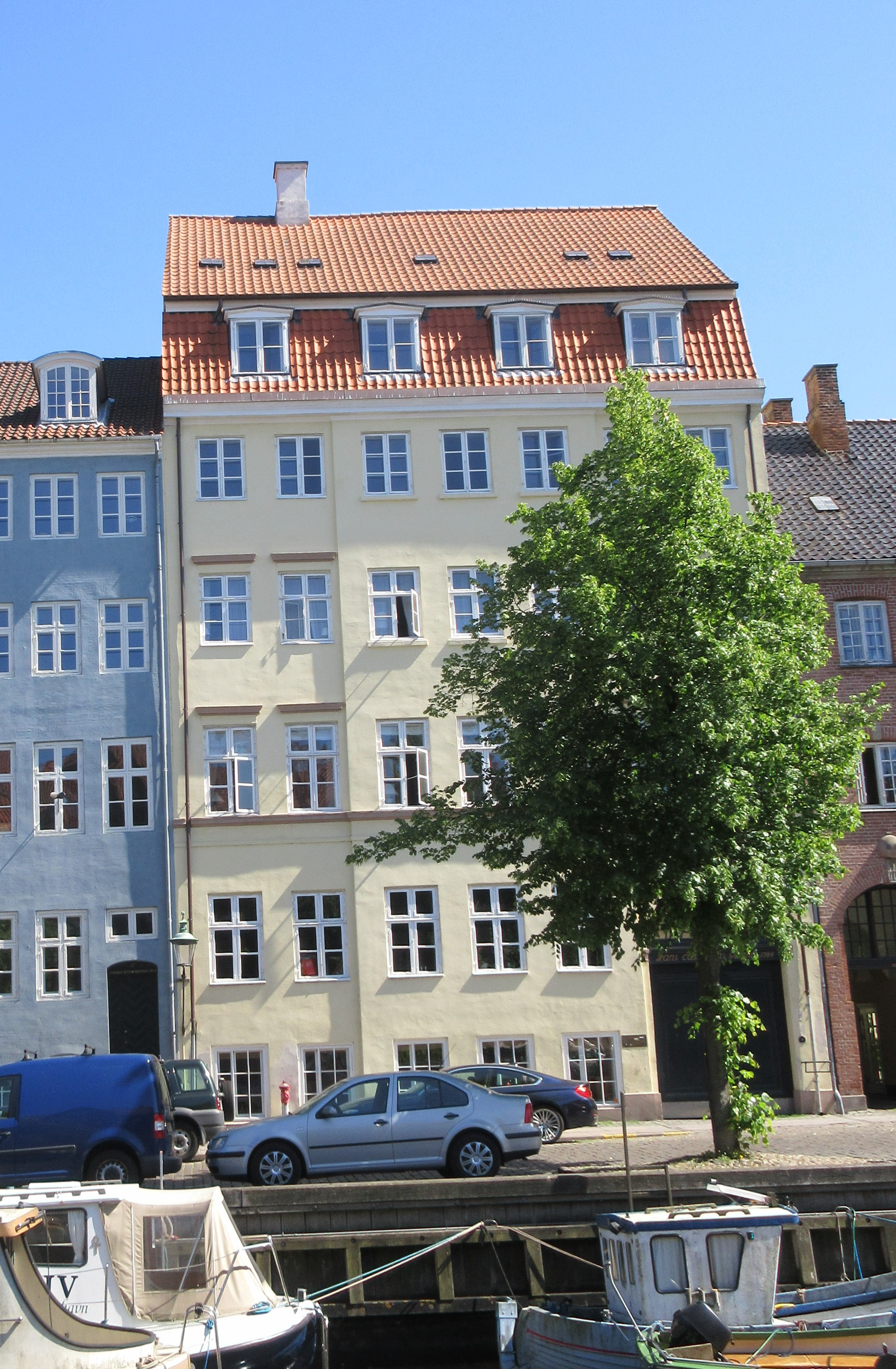
The building viewed from across the naval.

The building consists of four storeys over a raised cellar and is topped by a Mansard roof. It is seven bays wide and his a three-bay central projection. The gateway in the left-hand side of the building is topped by a fanlight and the Keystone features a relief of an anchor and an inscription.

== Cultural references ==
The building is used as a location in the 1953 feature film Kriminalsagen Tove Andersen.

== List of owners ==
- 1689 matr. 97 Verner Weendunchs Dronningensgade
- 1689 matr. 98 Bertel Stywer's indhegnede plads
- 1718–1720s Niels Flesborg,
- 1720–1733 Hans Brechtwoldt
- 1733–1749 Martha Nielsdatter Flesborg Brechtwoldt
- 1749–1750 Peter Nielsen Trye Friis
- 1755–1788 John Brown
- 1755–1765 Andreas Hegelund and Elisabeth Sophie/Gottfried August Neuhammer
- 1765–1776 Hans Caspersen
- 1776–1778 Oluf Munch
- 1778–1811 Arthur Bishop, enken Alison gift anden gang med Alexander Malcom
- 1811 Agent Joachim Israel Behrend
- 1811–1852 Lauritz Nicolai Hvidt

== Gallery ==
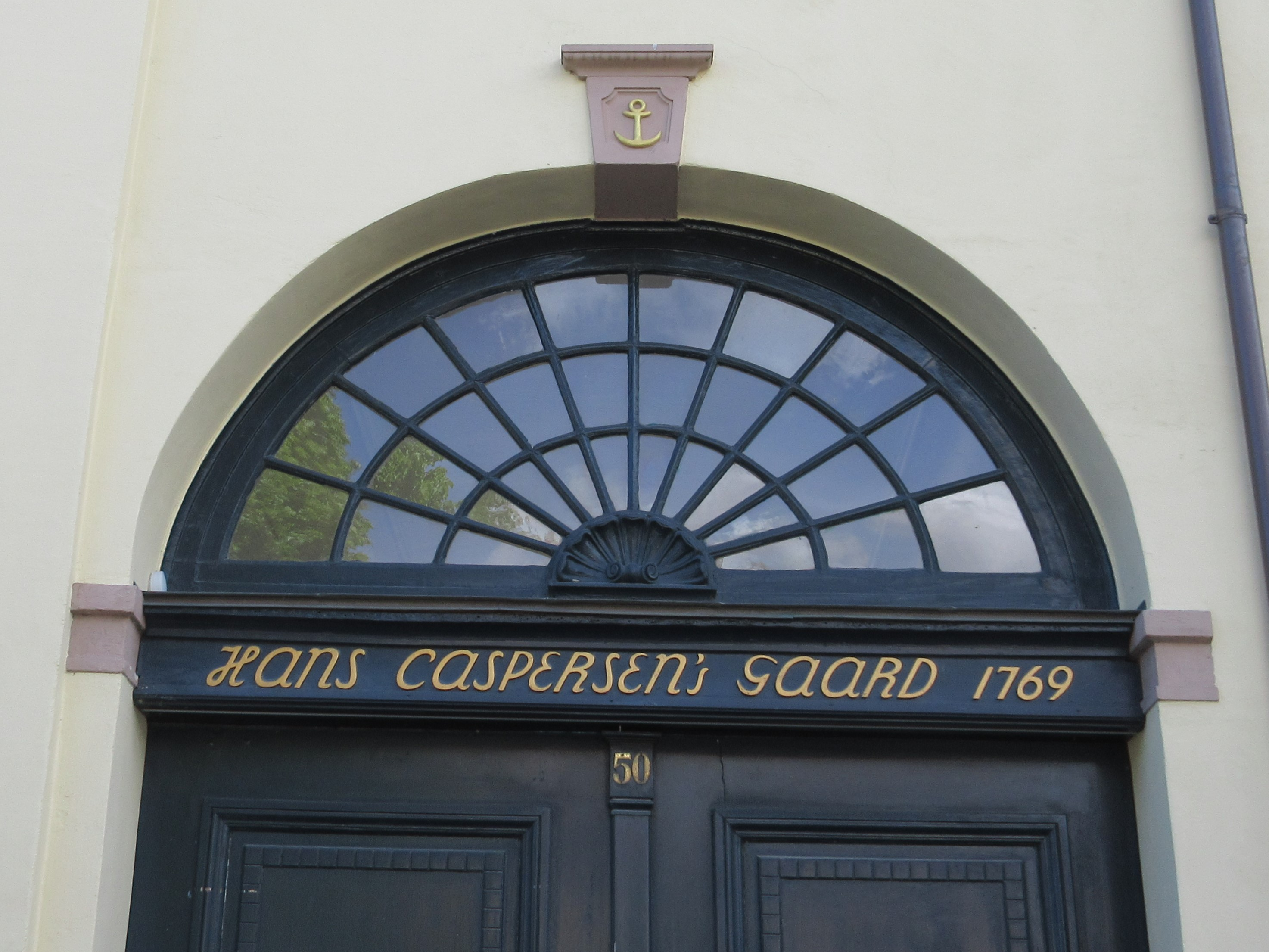
The fanlight.

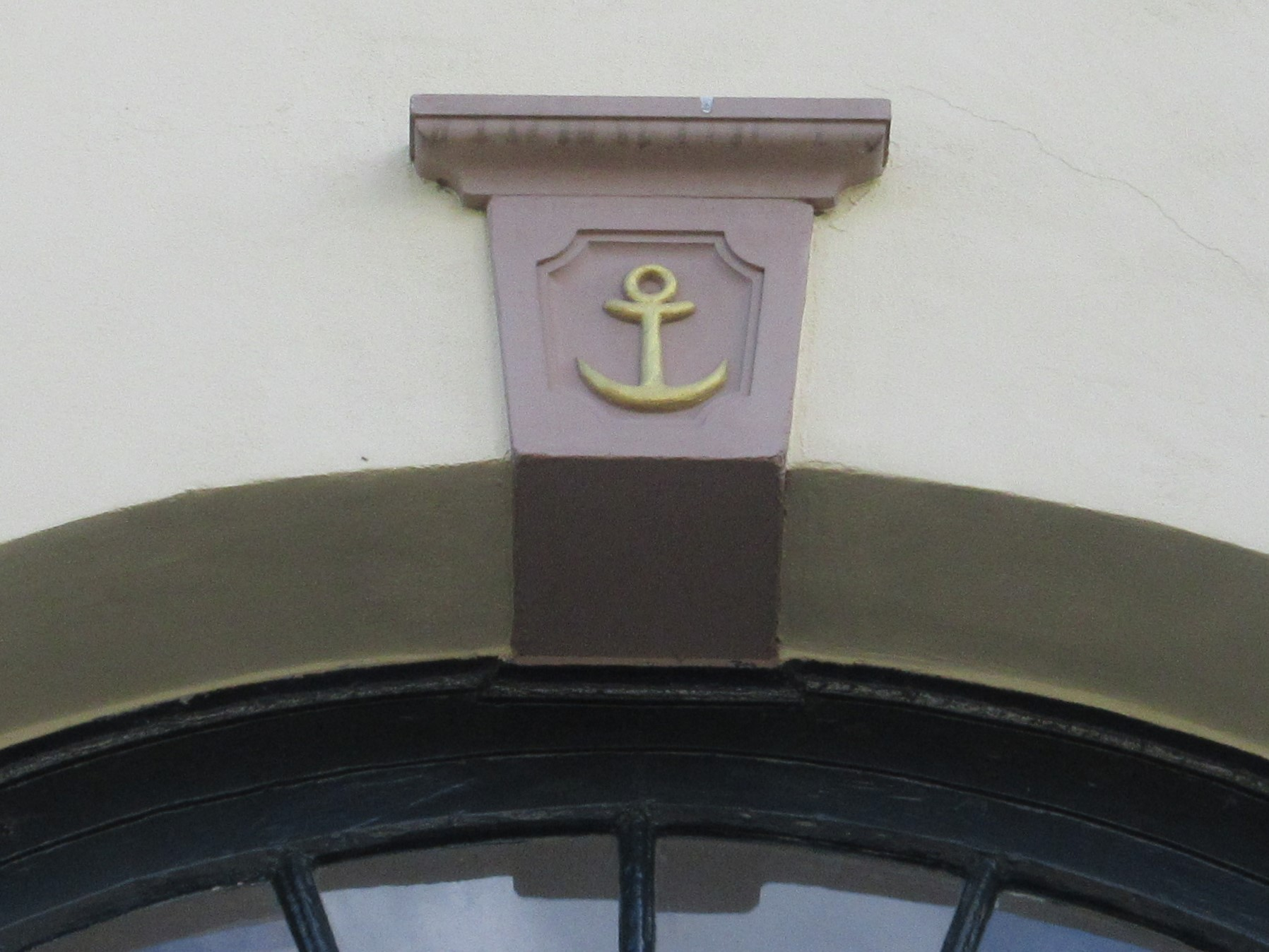
Close-up of the keystone.

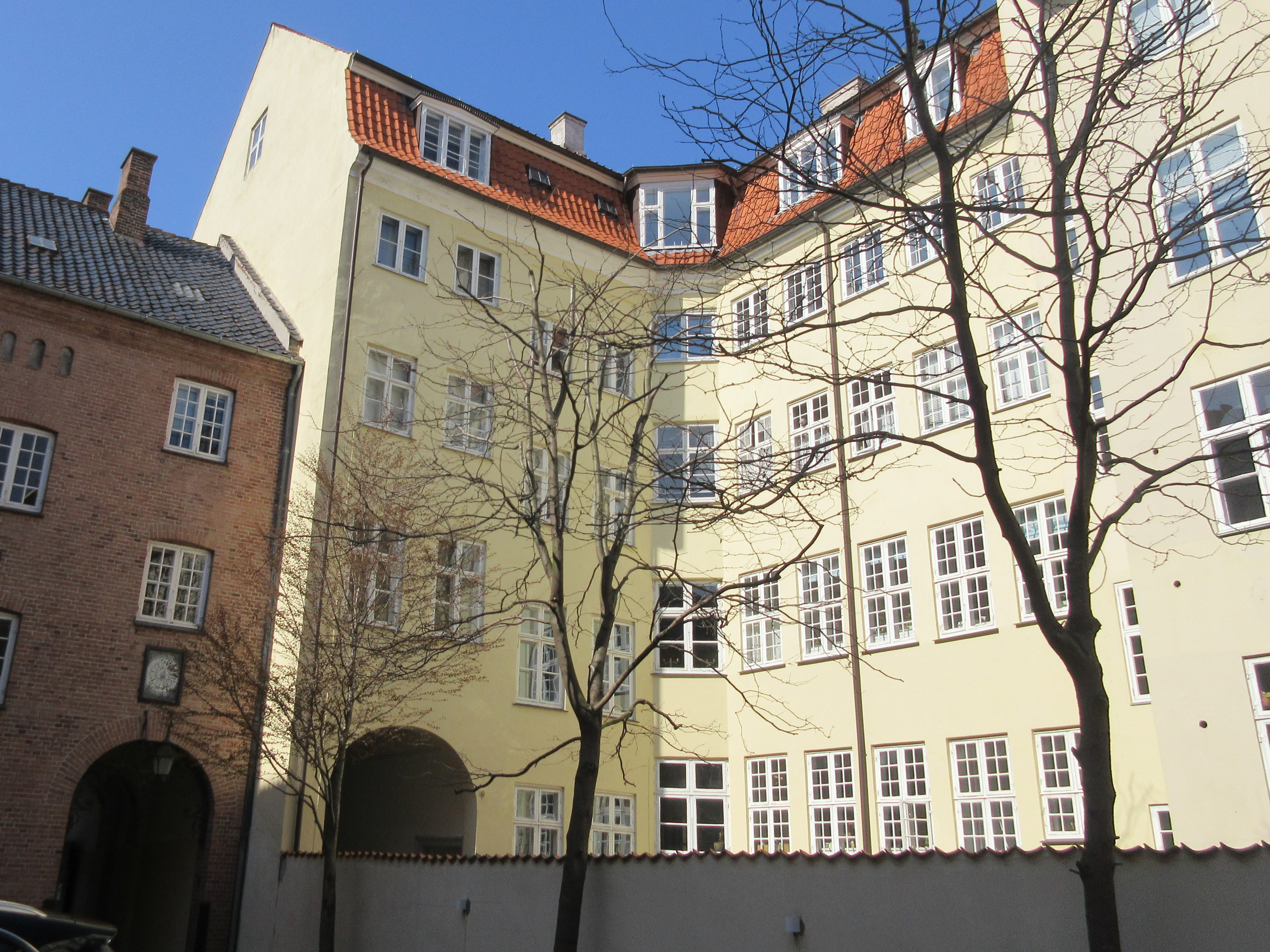
The rear side of the front wing and a bit of the side wing (right) viewed from the yard of Bombebøssen.

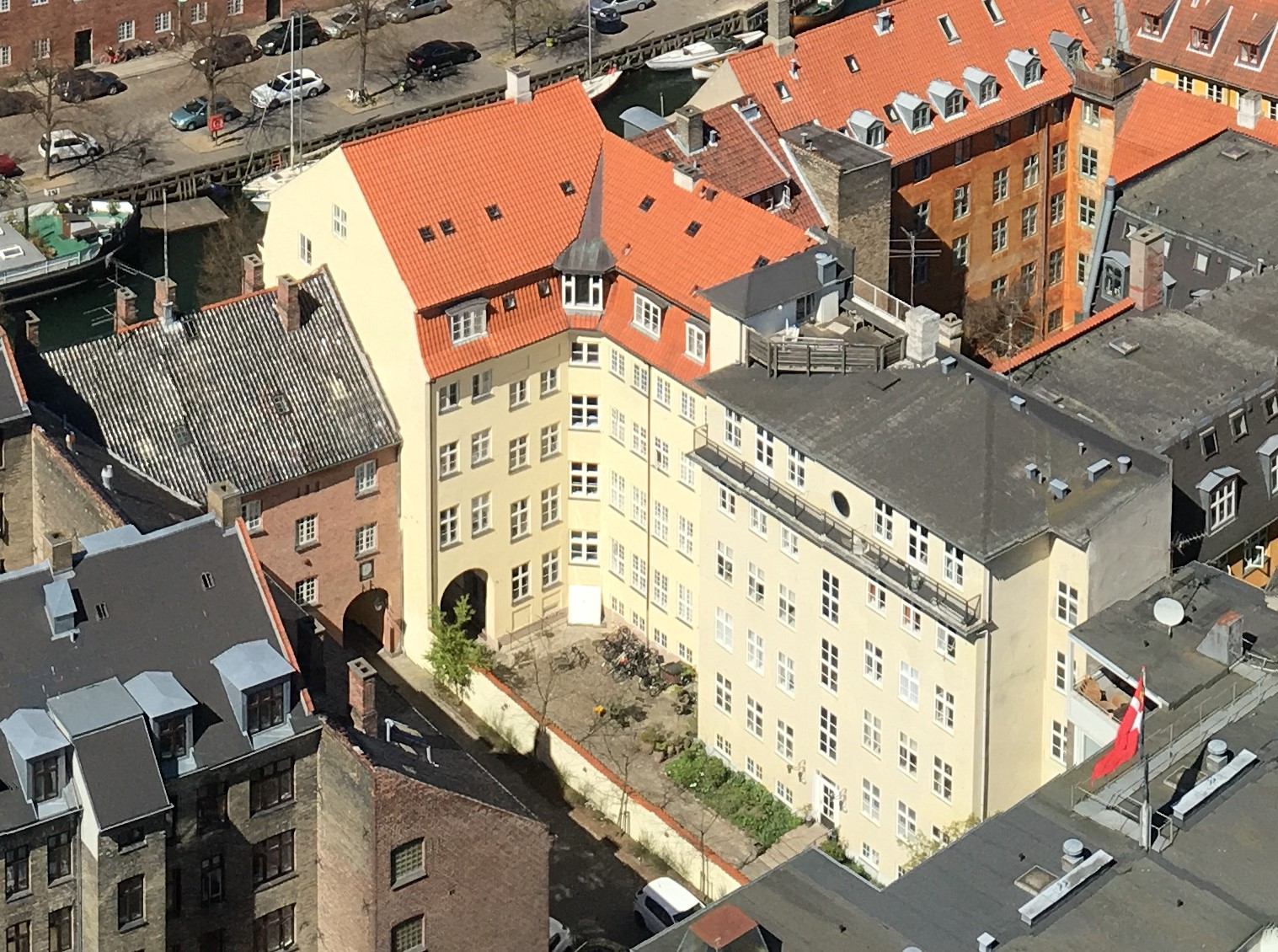
The building with its side wing and courtyard seen from the top of the Church of Our Saviour.

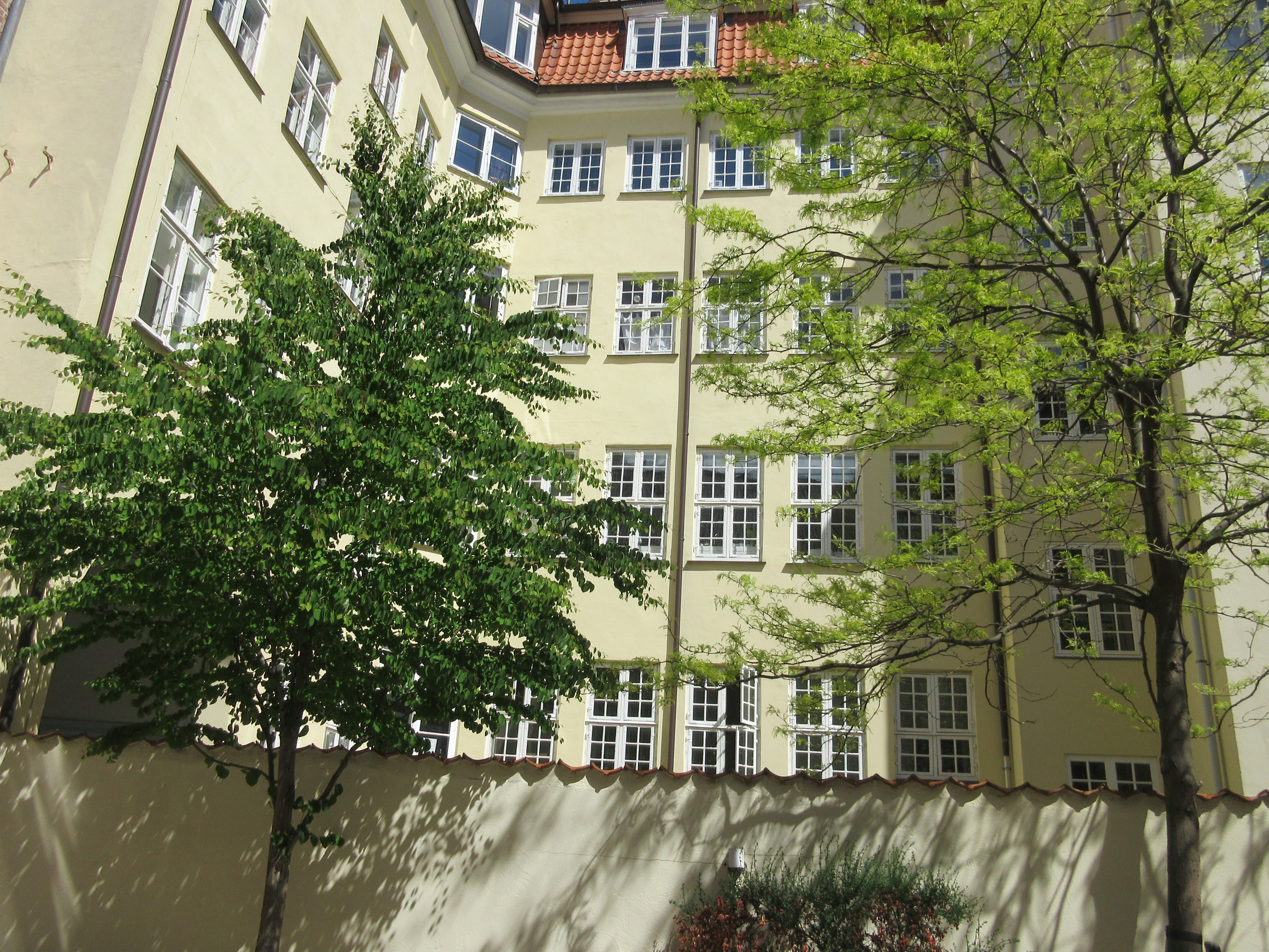
The side wing viewed from Bombebøssen's courtyard.

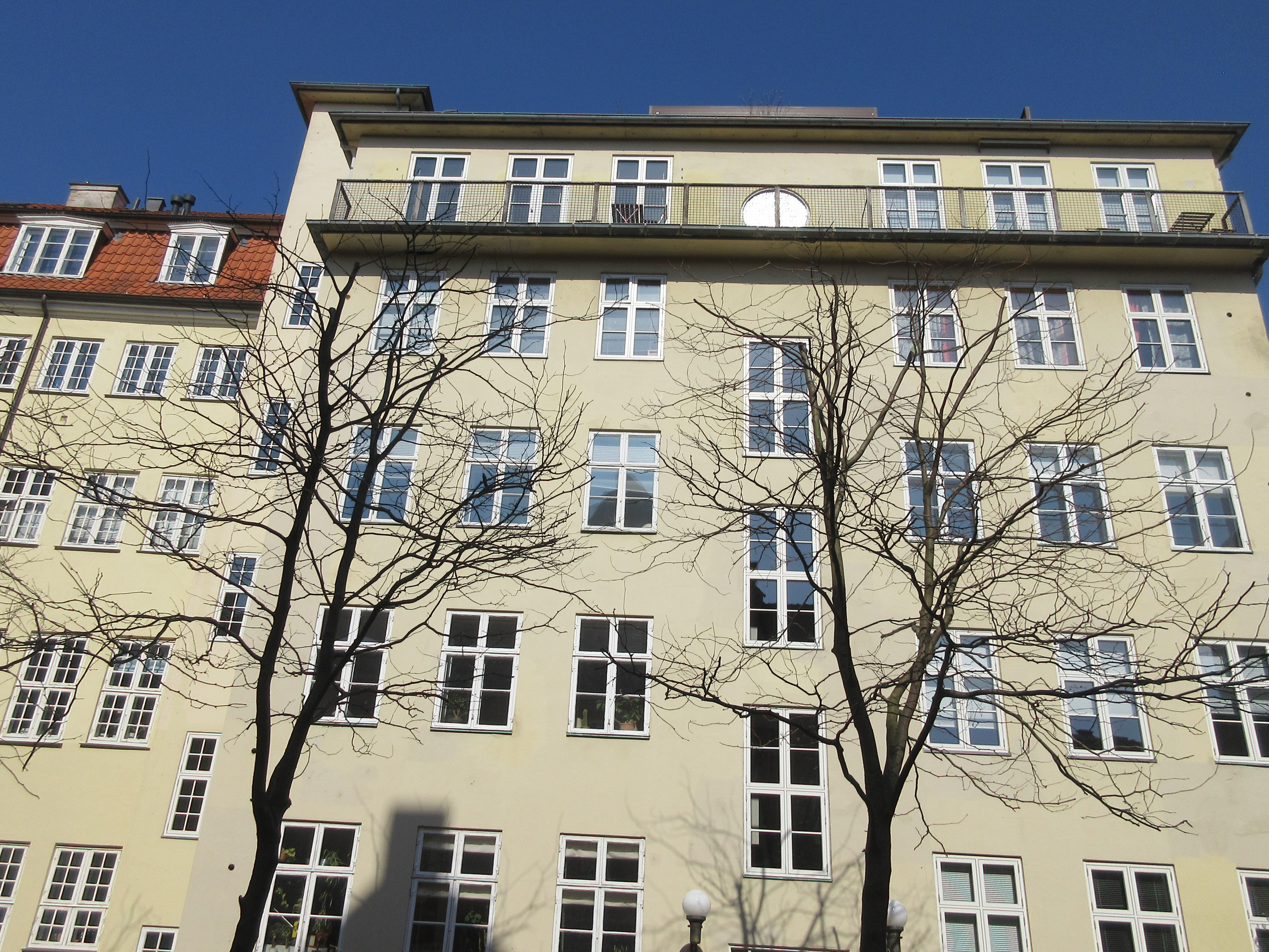
The rear wing.
