= Overgaden Neden Vandet 33 =

Residential property in central Copenhagen, Denmark

Hans Caspersen House
- Hans Caspersens Gård
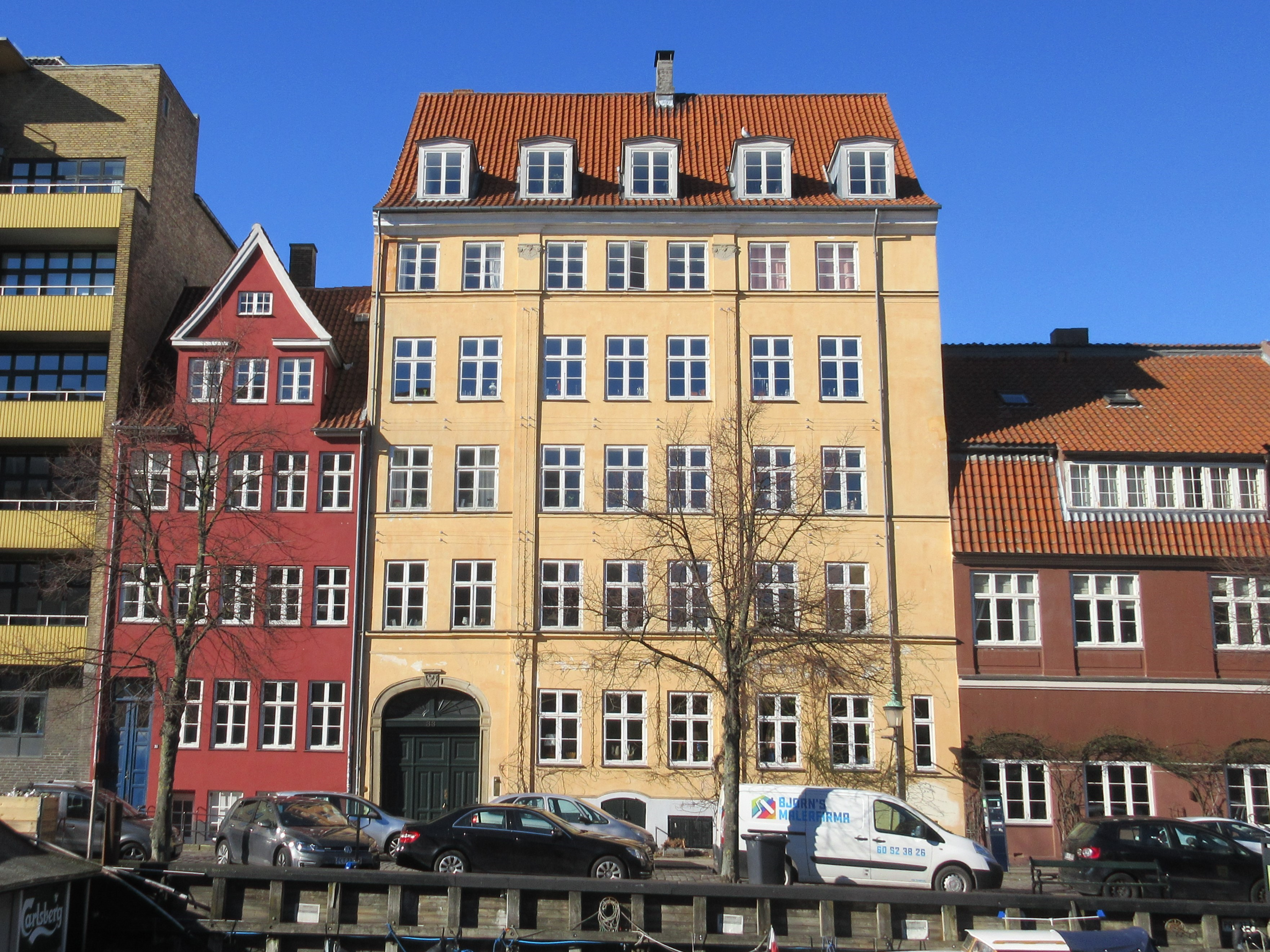
- Interactive map of the Hans Caspersen House area

General information
- Location: Copenhagen, Denmark
- Coordinates: 55°40′23.48″N 12°35′28.9″E
- Completed: 1783

Overgaden Neden Vandet 33 is a residential property in the Christianshavn neighborhood of central Copenhagen, Denmark. It is one of three properties along Christianshavn Canal that were built by anchor smith Hans Caspersen and are now known as the Hans Caspersen House, the other being Overgaden Oven Vandet 50 and Overgaden Neden Vandet 33. The building at Sankt Annæ Gade 4 is also associated with Caspersen. The building was listed on the Danish registry of protected buildings and places in 1918.

== History ==
=== The brewery ===
The property was listed in the Copenhagen first cadastre of 1790, as No. 88 in Christianshavn Quarter, owned by brewer Jens Bjørnsen. From 1717 to 1637, it belonged to Berndt Jensen. In a fire insurance policy from 1838, it is described as a two-storey half-timbered building, 10 bays wide towards the street and with gate and wall dormer. A 10-bay, two-storey half-timbered side wing, with shed roof, extended from the rear side of the building. The two buildings were connected by a 1.9 m wide, half-timbered staircase building. A free-standing, eight-bay, two-storey outbuilding with a shed roof and a water pump were also located in the courtyard.

In 1839, No. 88 was acquired by court baker Jochum Lentz (1690–1740) and his wife Marie Sophie Jensdatter (1689–1729). After Lentz' death in 1740, the property was sold to Christen Larsen Døstrup, a brewer and distiller, who shortly thereafter sold it to the Copenhagen Brewers' Guild.

=== Terchel Hansen Leye's house and workshop ===
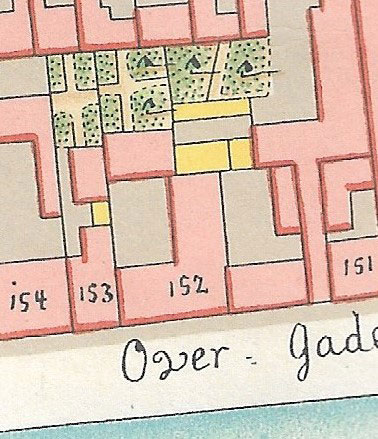
No. 30 (Matr. 152) seen in a detail from Gedde's district map

The property was acquired by master cooper Terchel Hansen Leye (1703–1760) in 1745. He undertook a comprehensive renovation of the complex. In a fire insurance policy from 1747, it is described as a seven-bay, two-storey brick building with wall dormer. The roof was clad with glazed tiles and topped by a gilded weather vane. The facade was decorated with stone portals around the gate and pilasters topped by sandstone capitals. Leye's property was listed in the new cadastre of 1756 as No. 152 in Christianshavn Quarter.

=== Hans Caspersen ===
The property was acquired by anchor smith Hans Caspersen in 1782. In 1782–83, he heightened the building with three floors.

=== 19th century ===
In 1797, Caspersen sold the property to master ship builder Jørgen Hansen Koch (1745–1801) and his wife Anne Cathrine Volkersen (1758–1809). Their son was the later architect and court master builder Jørgen Hansen Koch (1787–1860). The property was listed as No. 157 in the new cadastre of 1806.

The property was home to 32 residents in three households at the 1840 census. Hans Christian Ley, a master tailor, resided on the first floor with his wife Johanne Marie Ley, their four children (aged 22 to 34), two brothers-in-laws, four sisters-in-law, a nephew and a maid. Carl Wilhelm Wiehe (1788–1867), secretary in the Kommercekollegiet, resided on the second floor with his wife Antoinette Liuise Wiehe, their four children (aged 10 t0 20), acting student August Eduard Hansen (1820–1874) and one maid. The eldest son was the actor Michael Wiehe. Niels Brock Perch, a tea merchant, resided on the third floor with his wife Axeline Kirstine Henriette Holm, their five children (aged 12 to 27), his sister Helene Perch, one male servant and one maid. The actor Mikael Wiehe (1820–1864) was still a resident of the building in 1843–1844.

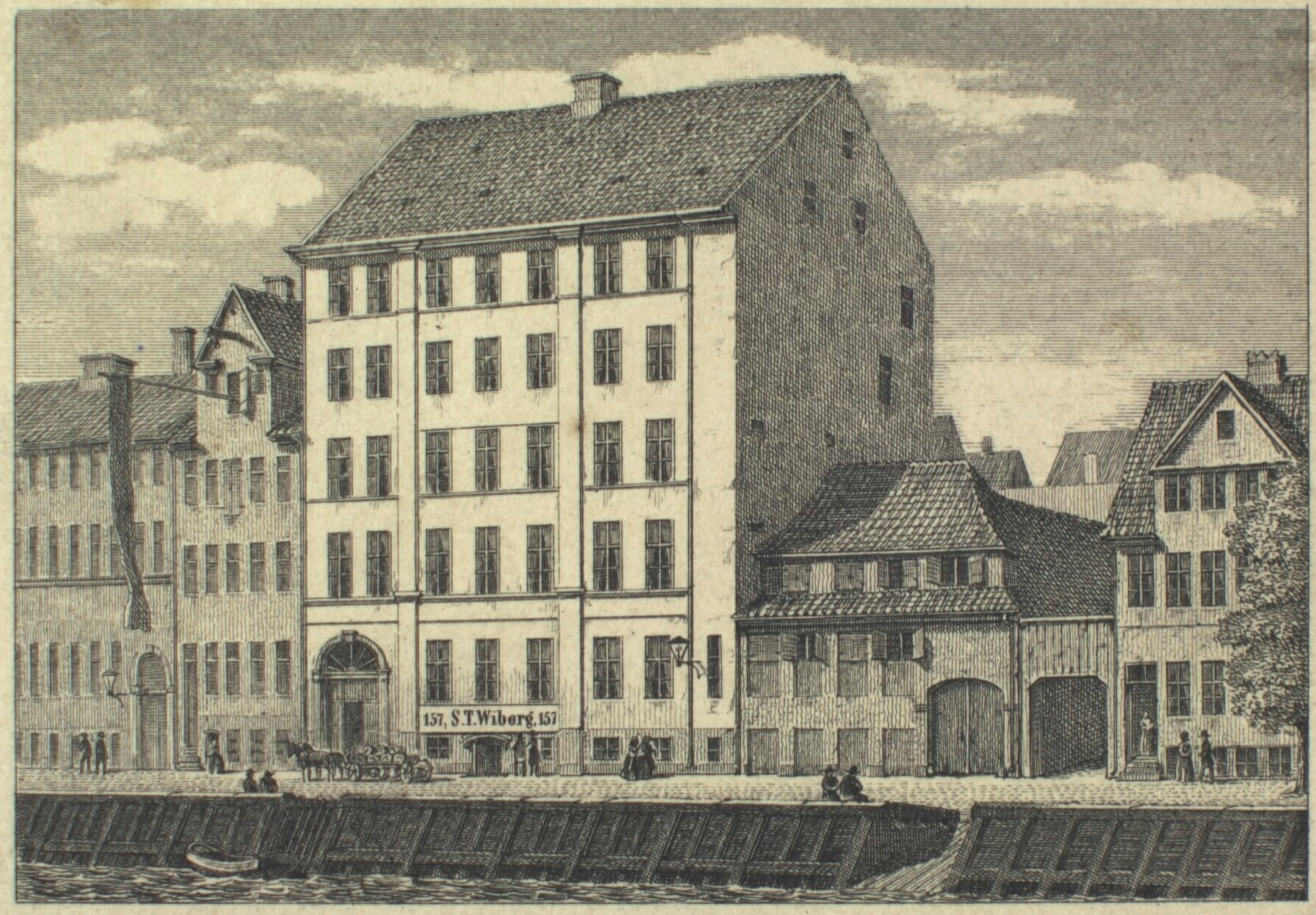
No. 157

The property was home to 38 residents at the 1860 census. Ludvig Johansen Vetterslev, a workman, resided on the ground floor with his wife Andrea Hanne f. Andresen and their two-year-old son. Johan Christian Jacobsen, a merchant trading in Iceland, resided on the first floor with his wife Dorthea Frederikke f. Kinding, their four children (aged two to 17), two sisters-in-laws, an apprentice and two maids. Mathias Lumholtz, an officer in the Royal Artillery Brigade with rank of major, resided in the building with his wife Anna Elisabeth (née Arntz), their five children (aged 19 to 24), one lodger and one maid. Carl Edouard Meldahl, another military officer with rank of second lieutenant, resided in the building with his wife Anine Pauline f. Kahn, their one-year-old son, 22-year-old Louise Kahn (father dead) and two maids. Rasmus Hansen, a former distiller, resided in the building with his wife Karen Marie Scholdborg and one maid.

The actor Emil Poulsen (1842–1911) was a resident of the building in 1869–71. The actor Olaf Poulsen (1849–1923) resided on the third floor in 1869–71.

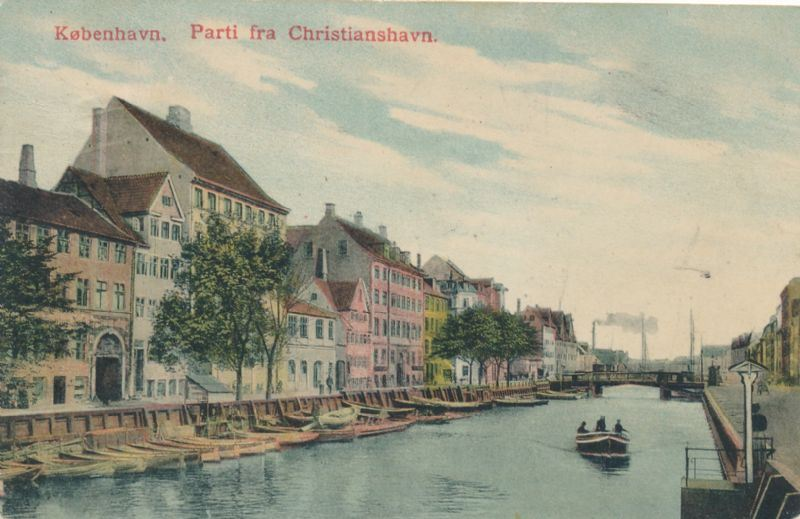
The building, seen farthest to the left on an old postcard

The property was home to 35 residents at the 1880 census. Haagen Hagen, a bookkeeper, resided on the ground floor with his wife Johanne Mathilde Hagen and one maid. Frederik Villiam Andersen, a businessman (grosserer), resided on the first floor with his wife Eleonore Caroline Andersen, their six children (aged four to nine), one male servant and three maids. Johan Lorenz Clemensen, a chief physician, resided on the second floor with his wife Ida Cathrine Clemensen, their daughter Amalie Clemensen, their foster daughter Frederikke Faber and one maid. Albert Olaf Eduard Gertner, a 22-year-old gardening student, was also resident on the second floor. Carl Vigand Lose, a treasurer, resided on the third floor with his wife Henriette Debora Losem, their one-year-old son and two maids. Hans Peter Andersen, the proprietor of a tavern in the basement, resided in the associated dwelling with his wife Josephine Charlotte Andersen.

== Architecture ==
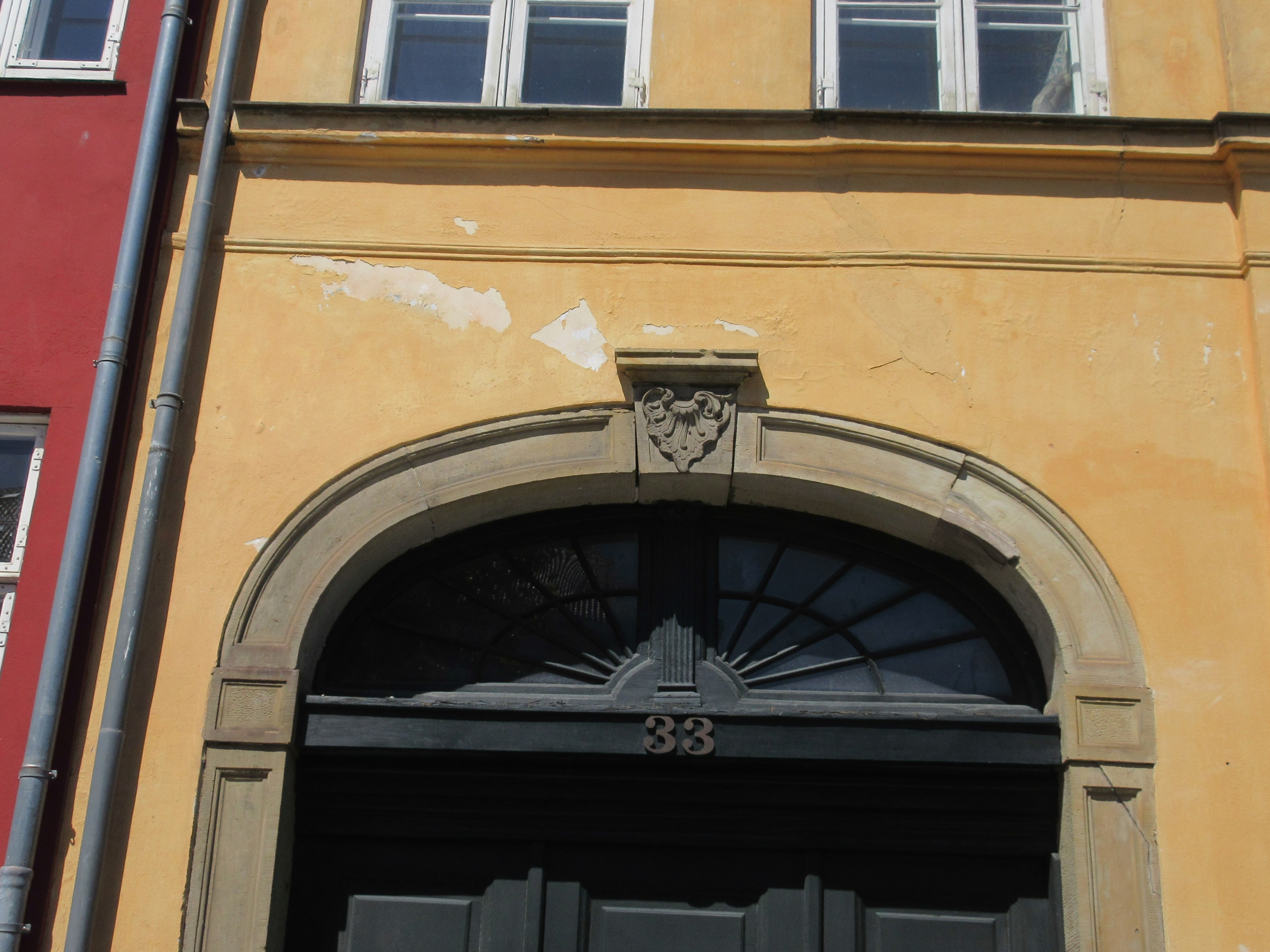
The fanlight and keystone

The building is seven bays wide. The facade is decorated with pilasters. The gate is topped by a fanlight and the keystone features a relief of a seashell.

== Today ==
The property was owned by Steen Olaf Toftebjerg in 2008.

== List of owners ==
- –1689 Jens Biørnsen
- 1717–1738 Berndt Jensen
- 1738–1740 Jochum Lentz
- 1740–1741 Christen Larsen Døstrup
- 1741–1745 Copenhagen Brewers' Guild
- 1745–1762 Terchel Hansen Leye / Mette Pederdatter
- 1762–1782 Dorothea Marie Terchelsdatter Reinholtz
- 1782–1797 Hans Caspersen
- 1797–1807 Jørgen Hansen Koch / Anne Cathrine Volkersen

== Gallery ==
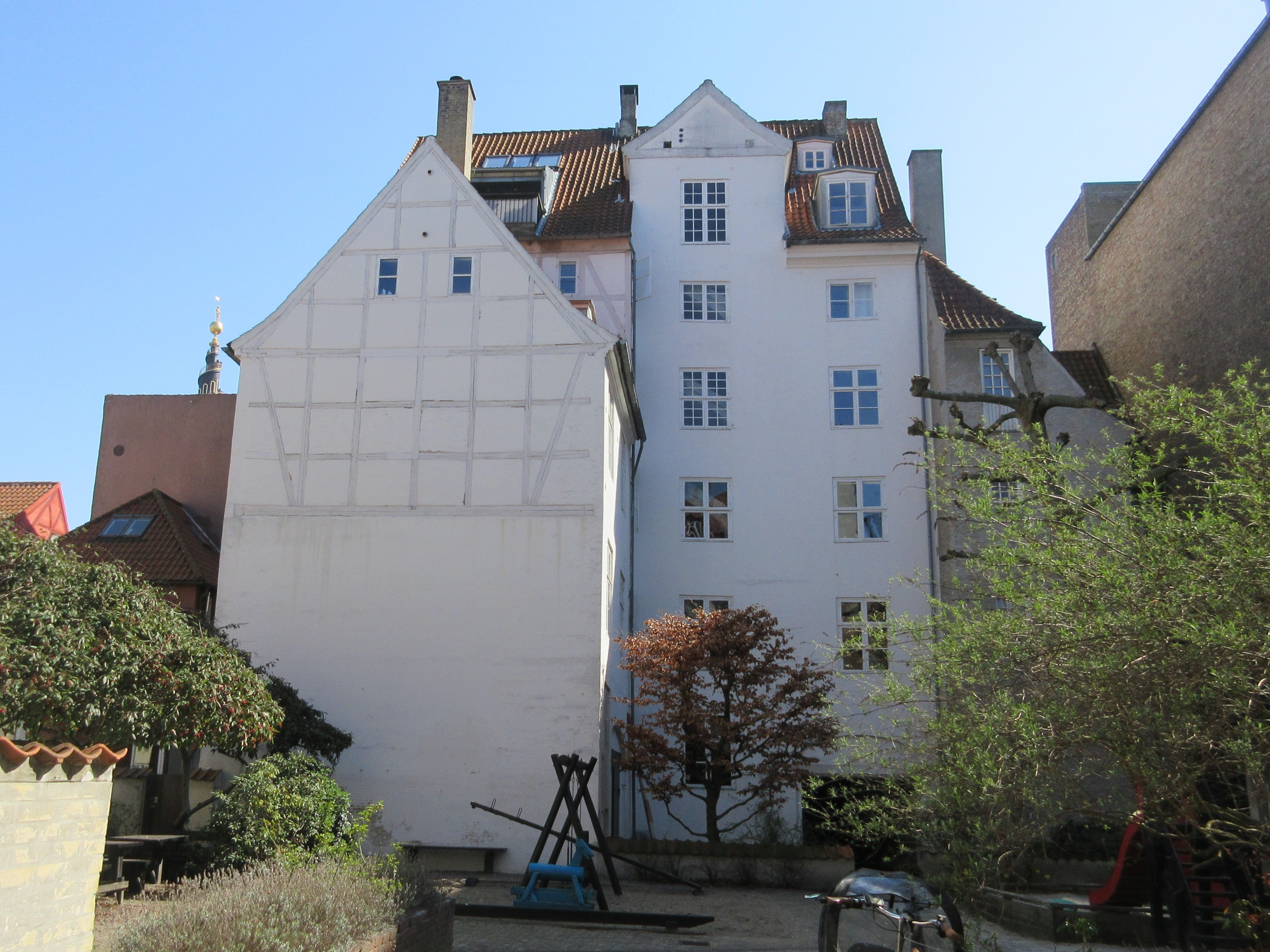
The building viewed from the courtyard

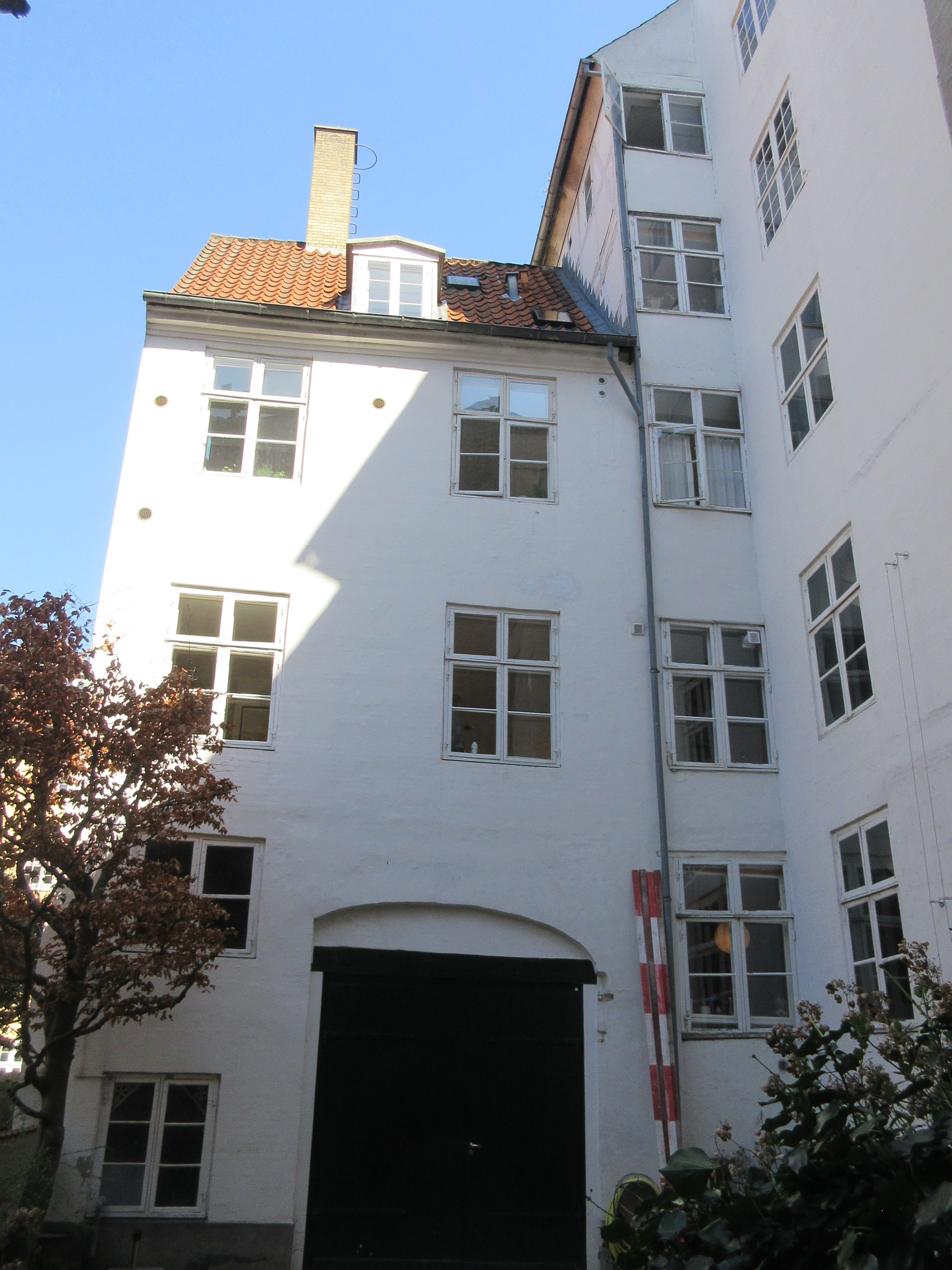
The side wing
