= Torvegade 22 =

Listed building in Copenhagen

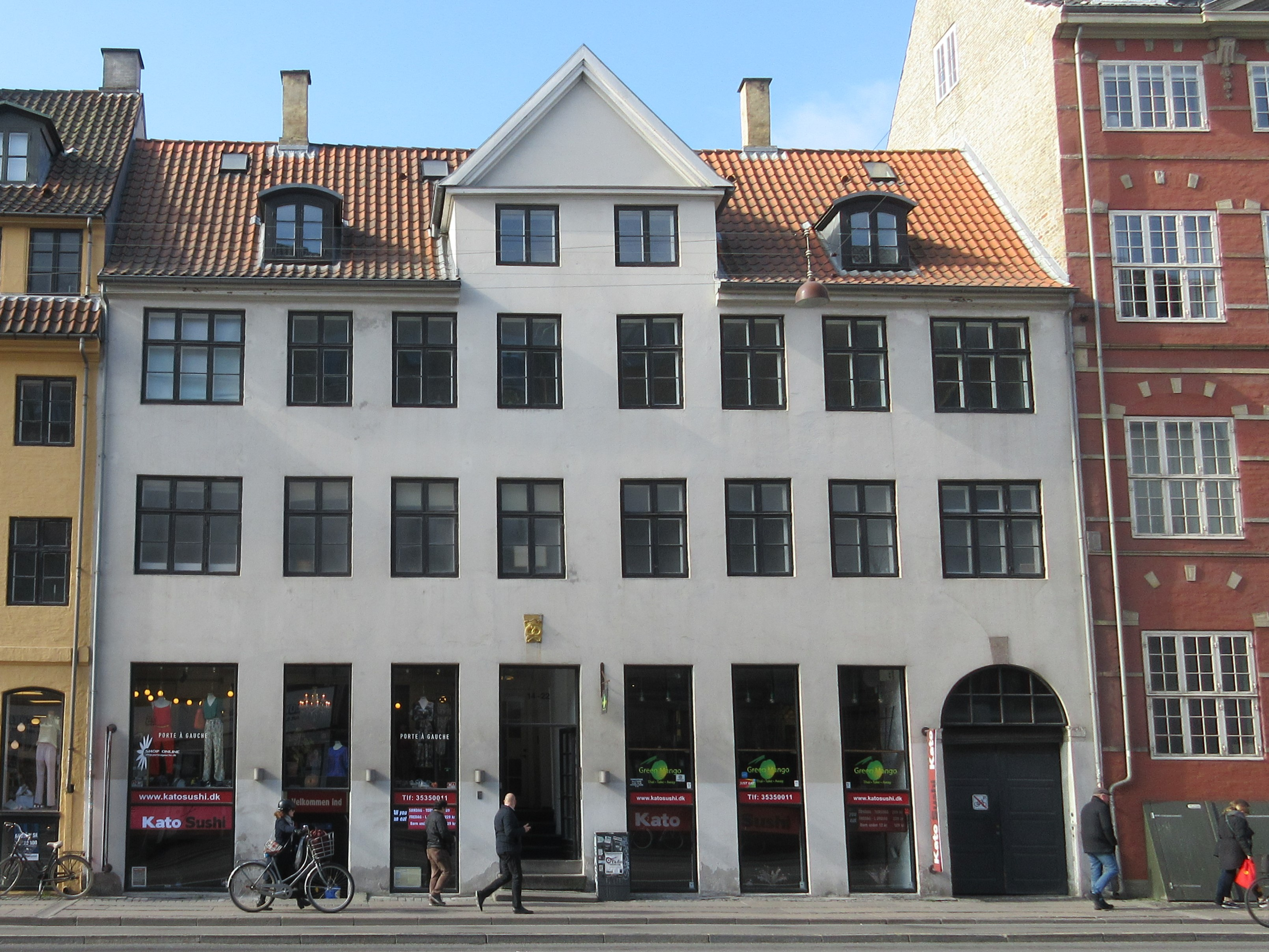
- Interactive map of the Torvegade 22 area

General information
- Location: Copenhagen, Denmark
- Coordinates: 55°40′23.77″N 12°35′21.8″E
- Completed: 1714

Torvegade 22 is an 18th-century property situated on Torvegade in the Christianshavn neighborhood of central Copenhagen, Denmark. The building was from its construction in 1714 to 1902 owned by bakers and the site of one of two bakeries in the street. A gilded kringle can still be seen above the main entrance. The other bakery was situated a little further down the street at Torvegade 28. The building was listed in the Danish registry of protected buildings and places in 1950.

== History ==
=== 18th century ===
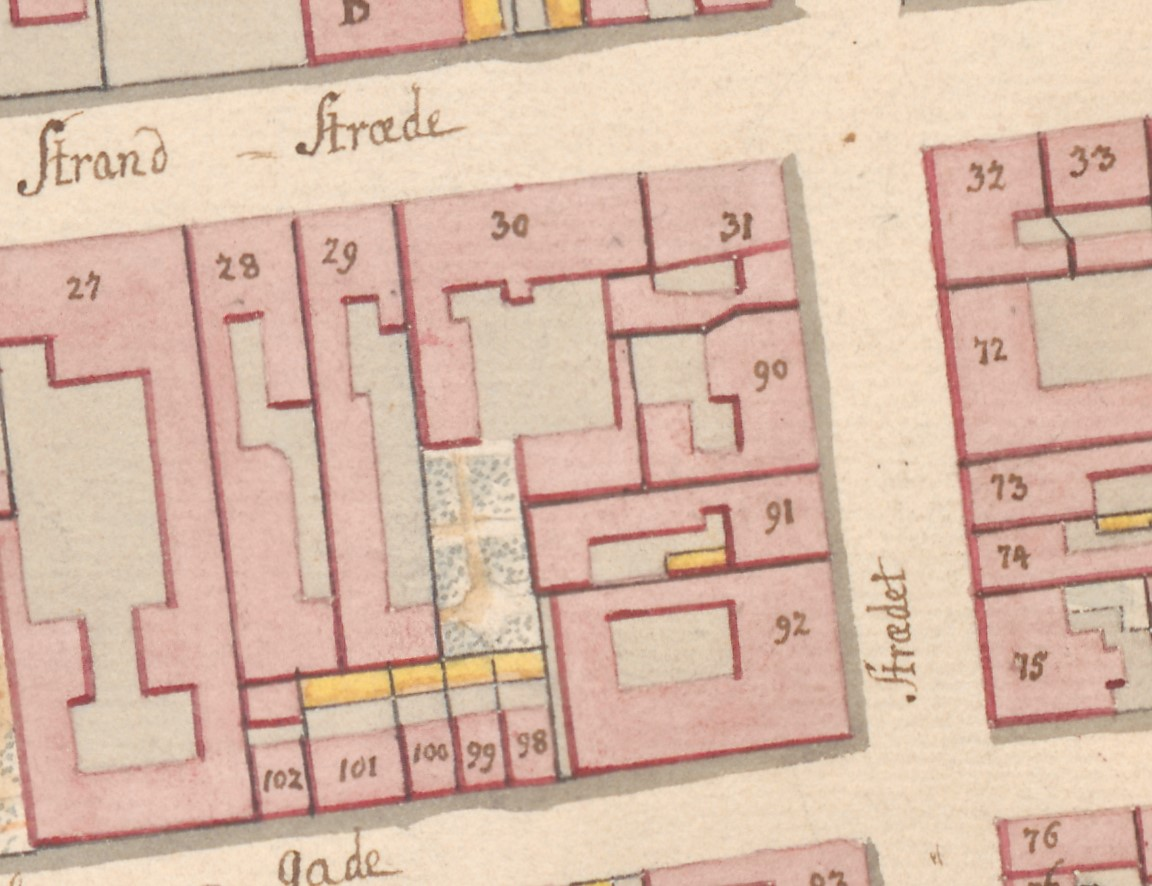
No. 90 seen on a detail from Christian Gedde's map of Christianshavn Quarter, 1757.

The site was made up of two small properties in the late 17th century. One of them was listed as No. 65 in Christianshavn Quarter in Copenhagen's first cadastre of 1689 and was at that time owned by baker Mikkel Bløcher. The other one was listed as No. 77 and belonged to a joiner named Lorends.

The present building on the site was constructed by court baker Jochum Lentz (1690-1740) in 1714. He resided in the building with his wife Marie Sophie Jensdatter (1689-1729). In 1736–41, he was the owner of a small property at Prinsessegade 8. In 1738–40, he was the owner of the property at Overgaden Neden Vandet 33. Their daughter Margrethe (1719-1758) was one year after her father's death in 1741 married to the merchant and ship-owner Andreas Bjørn (1703-1750).

The property in Torvegade was listed as No. 90 in the new cadastre of 1756 and was at that time owned by baker Hans Pedersen. The property was home to 19 residents in three households at the time of the 1787 census. Egnert Sivert Laub, a new master baker, resided in the building with his wife Sara Elisabeth Schuls, their one-year-old son Friderich Laub, a maid, a wet nurse and eight bakers. Fridrich Mathias Schults and Ane Peders Datter, Laub's parents-in-law, resided in another apartment. Lorentz Skoud, a 54-year-old man (no occupation mentioned in the census records), resided in the third apartment with his wife Bodel Hans Datter, their two daughters (aged 17 and 20) and one lodger.

=== 19th century ===
The property was home to 21 residents in three households at the time of the 1801 census. Peder Larsen, a new master baker, just 43 years old but already a widower, resided in the building with two maids, a caretaker and five bakers. Andreas Lindstrøm, an innkeeper, resided in the building with his wife Anne Kirstine Løfgreen, their two children (aged two and four), one maid and three lodgers (two sailors and a tailor). Truels Andersen, a sailor, resided in the building with his wife Anne Marie Andersen and their two children (aged four and six).

The property was listed as No. 126 in the new cadastre of 1806. It was at that time owned by baker Anders Schreiber,

The property was home to 19 residents in two households at the 1840 census. Paul Simon Henningsen, a master baker, resided on the ground floor with his wife Andrea Caroline (née Møller), their four children (aged two to 13), a female cook, a maid, a nanny, a caretaker, three bakers and two baker's apprentices. Christian Brøer Miømann, a ship carpenter, resided in the basement with his wife Louvise Christiane Mortensen, their five-year-old daughter Julie Olesine Miømann and the wife's mother Maren Mortensen.

The property was home to 19 residents in three households at the 1860 census. Frederik Rickmann, a master baker, resided on the ground floor with his wife Sophie (née Stube), their four children (aged seven to 18), one baker, three baker's apprentices, one maid and one caretaker. Elei Jeversen, a merchant trading on Iceland, resided on the first floor with his wife Hendriette, their 12-year-old son Jevigen Jevensen and the wife's sister Margrethe Jansen. Peter Petersen, an iron monger, resided in the basement with his wife Stine f. Johansen and their seven-year-old foster daughter Johanne Teol.

=== 20th century ===
The property was owned by bakers until 1902. In 1937, it was acquired by the clothing retailer company J. P. Bacher. The company had until then been based in Brogade. The name of the firm was later changed to Bacher & Schilder. In 2003, after more than one hundred years on Christianshavn, it relocated to new premises on Amagerbrogade.

== Architecture ==
Torvegade 22 is constructed on a plinth of field stone, in brick towards the street and with timber framing towards the yard, with three storeys over a walk-out basement. The sand-coloured facade is crowned by a two-bay gabled wall dormer. The main entrance to the ground floor is topped by a keystone with a gilded relief of a crowned kringle. The basement entrance is located in the second bay from the left. A green-painted gate in the bay furthest to the right provides access to the courtyard. The keystone features the cadastral number (No. 90) and the two imposts feature the numbers "17" and "75" (as a reference to the year 1775). The pitched red tile roof is pierced by two tall chimneys. The pitched red tile roof features one small dormer window on each side of the gabled wall dormer on the street side and another seven dormer windows towards the yard. The roof ridge is pierced by two relatively tall chimneys. A side wing projects from the rear side of the building along the south side of the courtyard and is again attached to a rear wing. These side wing, rear wing and the rear side of the main wing are all constructed with black-painted timber framing and plastered and yellow-painted infills. The side wing and rear wing are both topped by monopitched red tile roofs.

== Today ==
The property was owned by Ejendomsselskabet Bachers Hus APS in 2008.

== Gallery ==
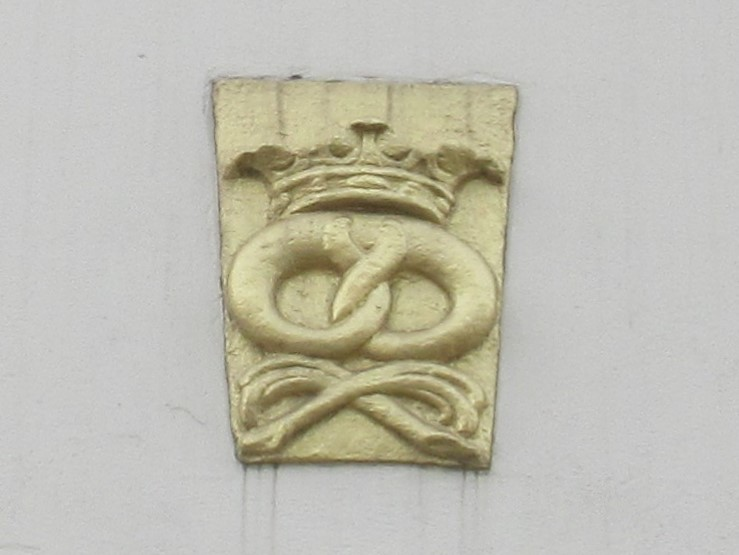

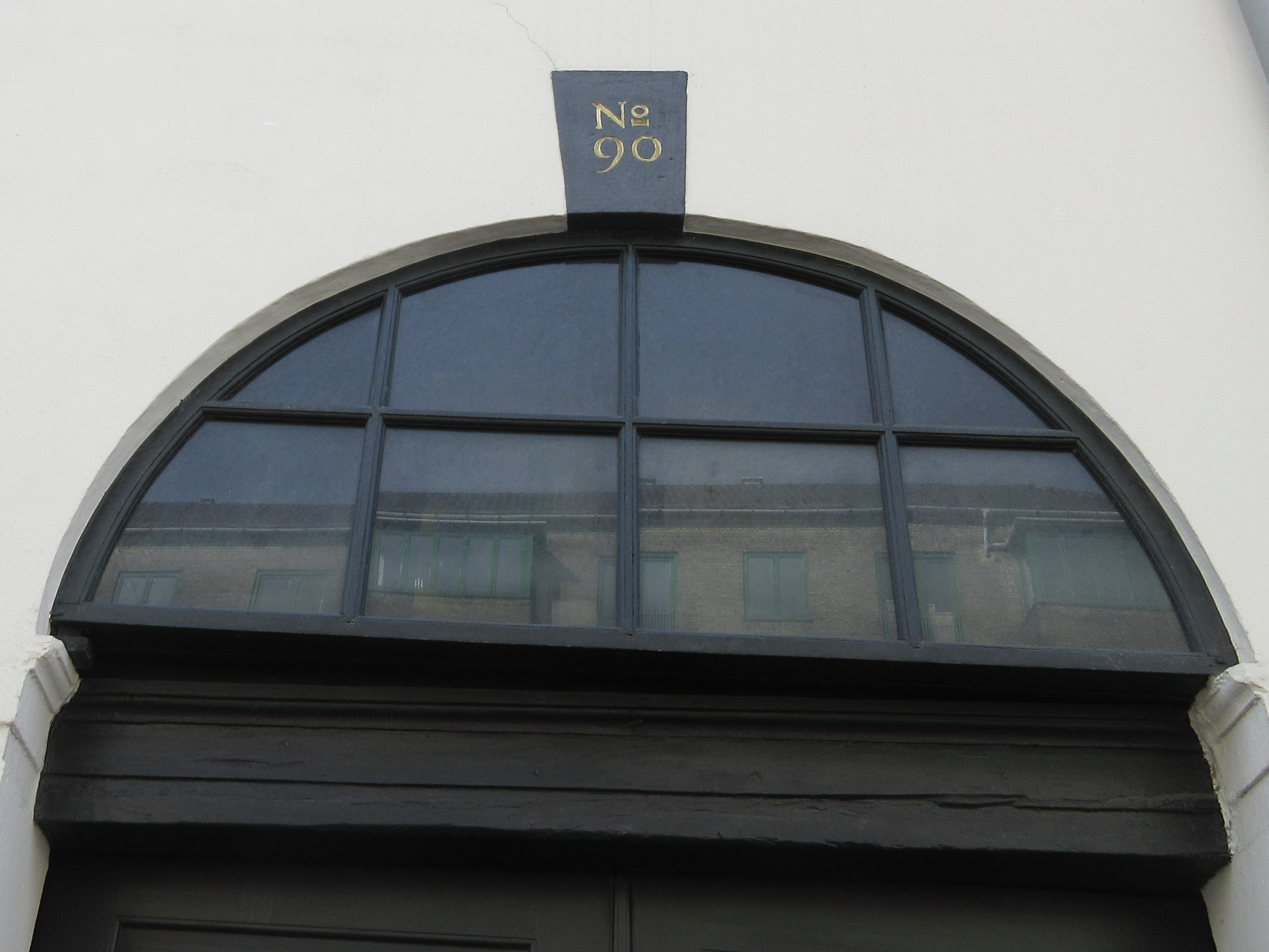

== See also ==
- Kringlegangen
