= Overgaden Oven Vandet 24 =

Building in Copenhagen, Denmark

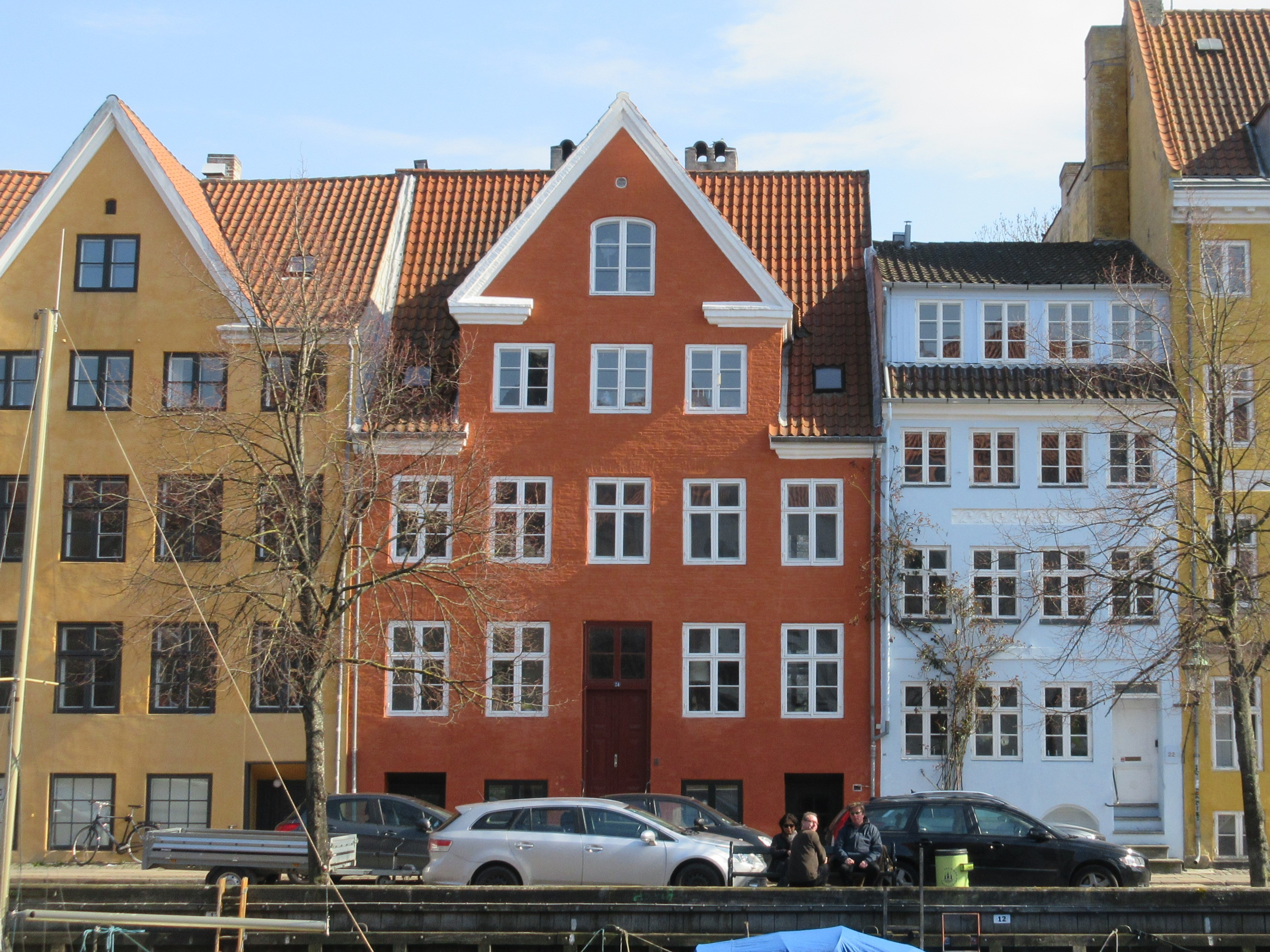
- Interactive map of the Overgaden Oven Vandet 24 area

General information
- Location: Copenhagen, Denmark
- Coordinates: 55°40′16.03″N 12°35′21.01″E
- Completed: c. 1730
- Renovated: 1960s, 2002–03

Overgaden Oven Vandet 24 is an 18th-century property overlooking Christianshavn Canal in the Christianshavn neighborhood of central Copenhagen, Denmark. It was listed in the Danish registry of protected buildings and places in 1945. Notable former residents include the politician Asmund Gleerupl.

== History ==
=== 17th century ===
Back when Christianshavn was first established the site was part of a much larger property comprising what is now Overgaden 24–28 and Dronningensgade 17–23. This large property was ceded to mayor Knud Marquardsen in 1622. The section along the canal was first built over in 1635–1675. In 1675, it was the site of two small houses and a building with shed roof. The present building on the site was constructed some time between 1718 and 1732 for skipper Michel Michelsen Arndt.

=== 18th century ===
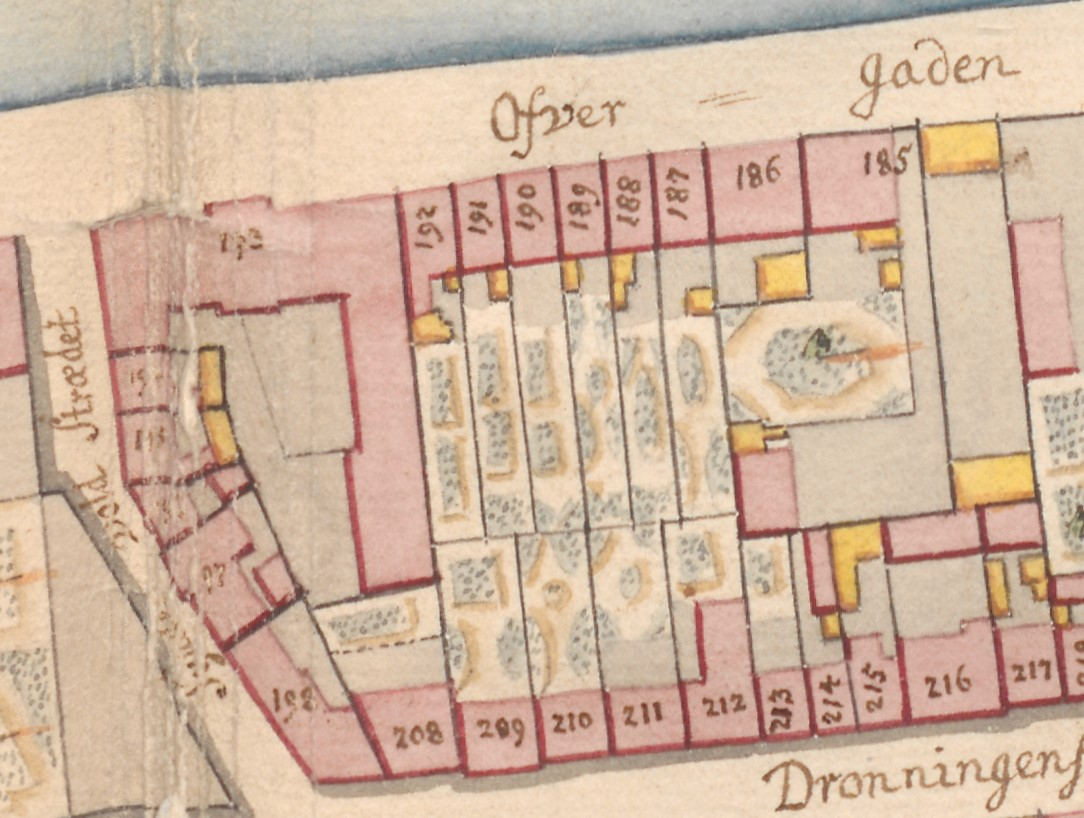
No. 186 seen on a detail from Christian Gedde's map of Christianshavn Quarter, 1757.

The property was listed as No. 186 in the new cadastre of 1756 and was at that time owned by skipper Lars Larsen Bornholm. The property now known as Overgaden Oven Vandet 24 was individually listed as No. 105 in Copenhagen's first cadastre of 1689. It was at that time owned by carpenter Anders Gudmandsen.

The property was home to 22 residents in five households at the 1787 census. Mariane Valeur, widow of a pastor, resided in the building with her five children (aged six to 12), two lodgers and one maid. Mars Henrichen Deppert, a smith, resided in the building with his wife Dorthe Elisabeth Hlund, one maid and two lodgers. Bent Nielsen, a workman, resided in the building with his wife Sara Larsdatter. Rasmus Hansen, a former soldier, resided in the building with his wife Kirstine Wolf and two daughters (aged six and eight). Knud Larsen, a carpenter, resided in the building with his wife Ane Larsdatter.

=== 19th century ===
The property was home to 32 residents in nine households at the 1801 census. Frans Nielsen Gudmansen, a master joiner, resided in the building with his wife Anne Marie Knudsdatter and one maid. Christen Jensen, a barkeeper, resided in the building with his wife Anne Marie Kiersgaard and their two daughters (aged two and four). Christen Sørensen, a watchman, resided in the building with his wife Magdalene Olsdatter, their three children (aged two to 11) and three lodgers. Andreas Michelsen, a sailor, resided in the building with his wife Else Cathrine Hansen and their seven-year-old daughter. Sander Hansen Saine, another sailor, resided in the building with his wife Anne Cathrine Holm. Inger Nicolai Ps Petersens, a widow innkeeper, resided in the building on her own. Ole Jaberg, a boatman, resided in the building with his wife Anne Margrethe [Jaberg] and their two children (aged three and five). Henrich Hermansen, a watchman, resided in the building with his wife Karen Christensdatter and their five-year-old son.

The property was listed as No. 190 in the new cadastre of 1806. It was at that time still owned by Niels Gudmandsen.

Asmund Gleerupl, a later politician, was among the residents of the building in around 1839. He then worked as a clerk at Christianshavn Penitentiary.

The building was home to 29 residents at the 1860 census. Lars Christian Bagge, a master cooper, resided in one of the ground floor apartments with his wife Johanne Nicoline Madsen, one cooper's apprentice and two lodgers (building painter and goldsmith). Waldemar Jørgen Jensen, a carpenter, resided in the other ground floor apartment with his wife Petrea Frederiche Møller. Anne Dortea Iversen, a widow needleworker, resided in one of the first floor apartments with a daughter and two lodgers (building painter and cooper). Carl Conrad Grove, a watchman, resided in the other first floor apartment with his wife Ane Magrete Møller and their three-year-old daughter. Ernst Frederik Ferdenant Jensen, a smith, resided on the second floor with his wife Helene Brodhorst, their seven-year-old daughter and two lodgers (chairmaker and seamstress). Ane Magrehte Husen, a widow needleworker, resided in the other second floor apartment with a 10-year-old grandson. Carl Lauritz Jensen Christensen, a smith, resided on the second floor with his wife Petroline Jensen. Carl Frederik Hansen, a cooper, resided in the basement with his wife Sophie Elisabet Povelsen and their three children (aged two to seven).

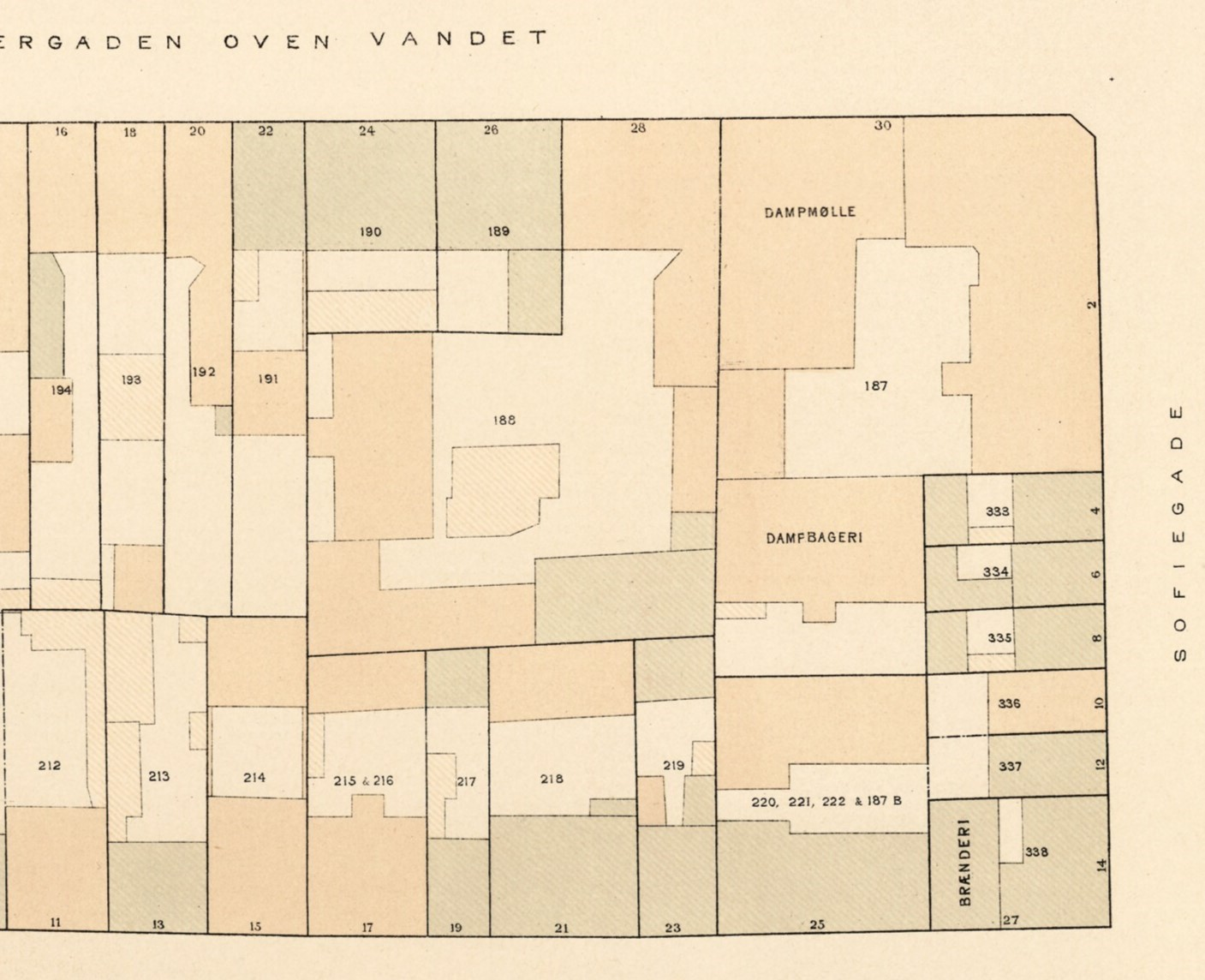
Overgaden Oven Vandet 24 seen on a detail from one of Berggreen's block plans of Christianshavn, 1886–88.

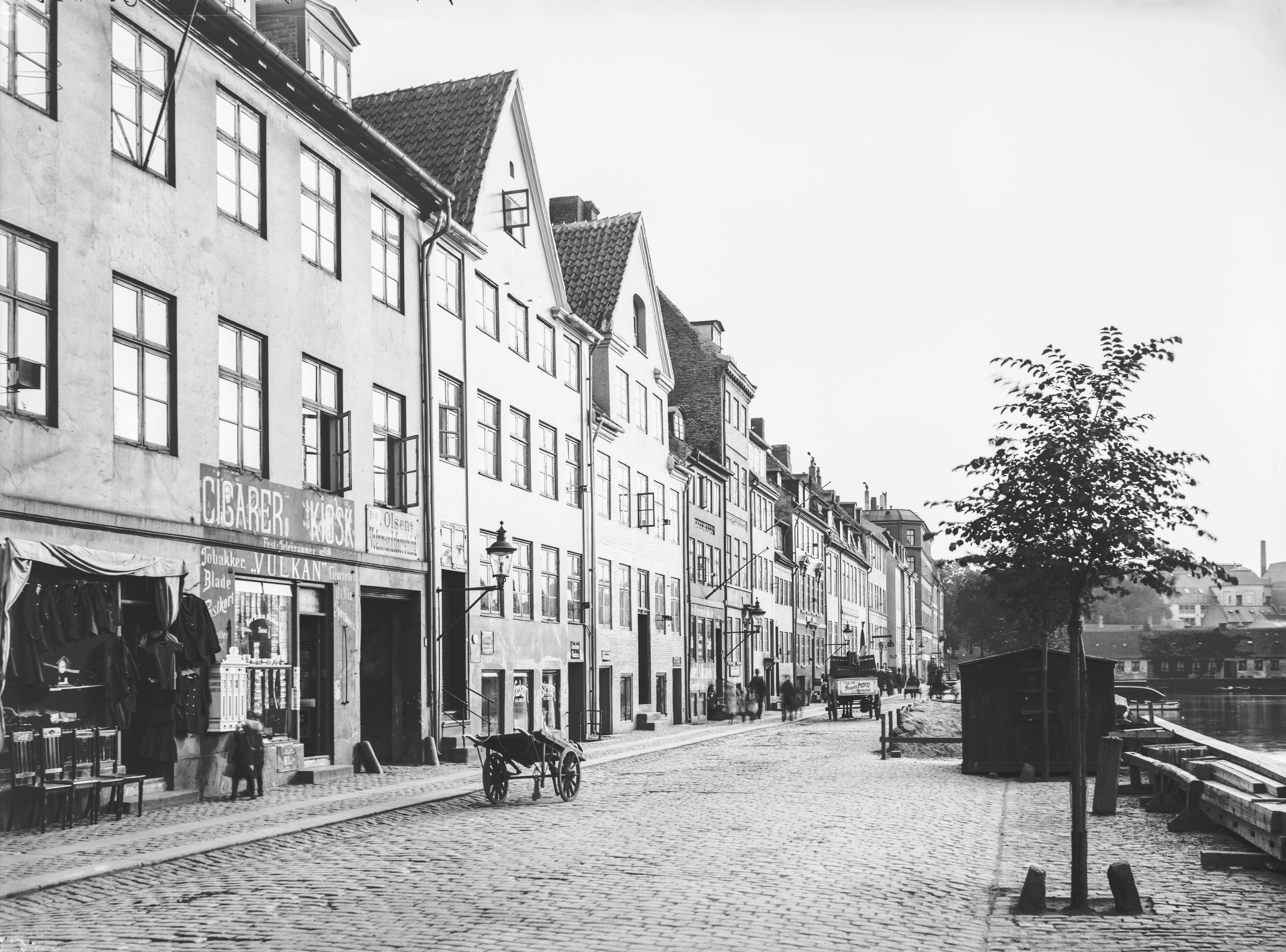
The building photographed by Johannes Hauerslev.

The property was home to 21 residents at the 1880 census. Frederik Nielsen, a merchant (hørkræmmer), resided on the ground floor with his wife Johanne Marie Nielsen. Laura Augusta Flade, a craftsman (naadler), resided on the ground floor with two lodgers. Severin Madsen, a master building painter, resided on the first floor with his wife Anna Petrine Hansine Madsen and their two children (aged six and 11). Lauritz Julius Petersen, a coachman, resided on the first floor with his wife Nelly Vilhelmine Mathilde Petersen. Jens Lars Petersen, a workman, resided on the second floor and in the garret with his wife Hansine Petersen, their seven-year-old daughter and one lodger (ropemaker). Carl Alexander Didriksen, a joiner, was also residing on the second floor and in the garret with his wife Anna Cathrine Didriksen. Andreas Andersen, a ship carpenter, resided in the basement with his wife Marie Frederikke Andersen, their 32-year-old daughter Camilla Andrea Andersen (needlework) and their 21-year-old son Peter Valdemar Andersen (saddler).

=== 20th century ===
The building was listed on the Danish registry of protected buildings and places in 1945. The two small apartments on the upper floor were merged in connection with a renovation of the building in the 1960s. In 2002—03, Overgaden Oven Vamdet 24 was subject to another renovation.

== Architecture ==
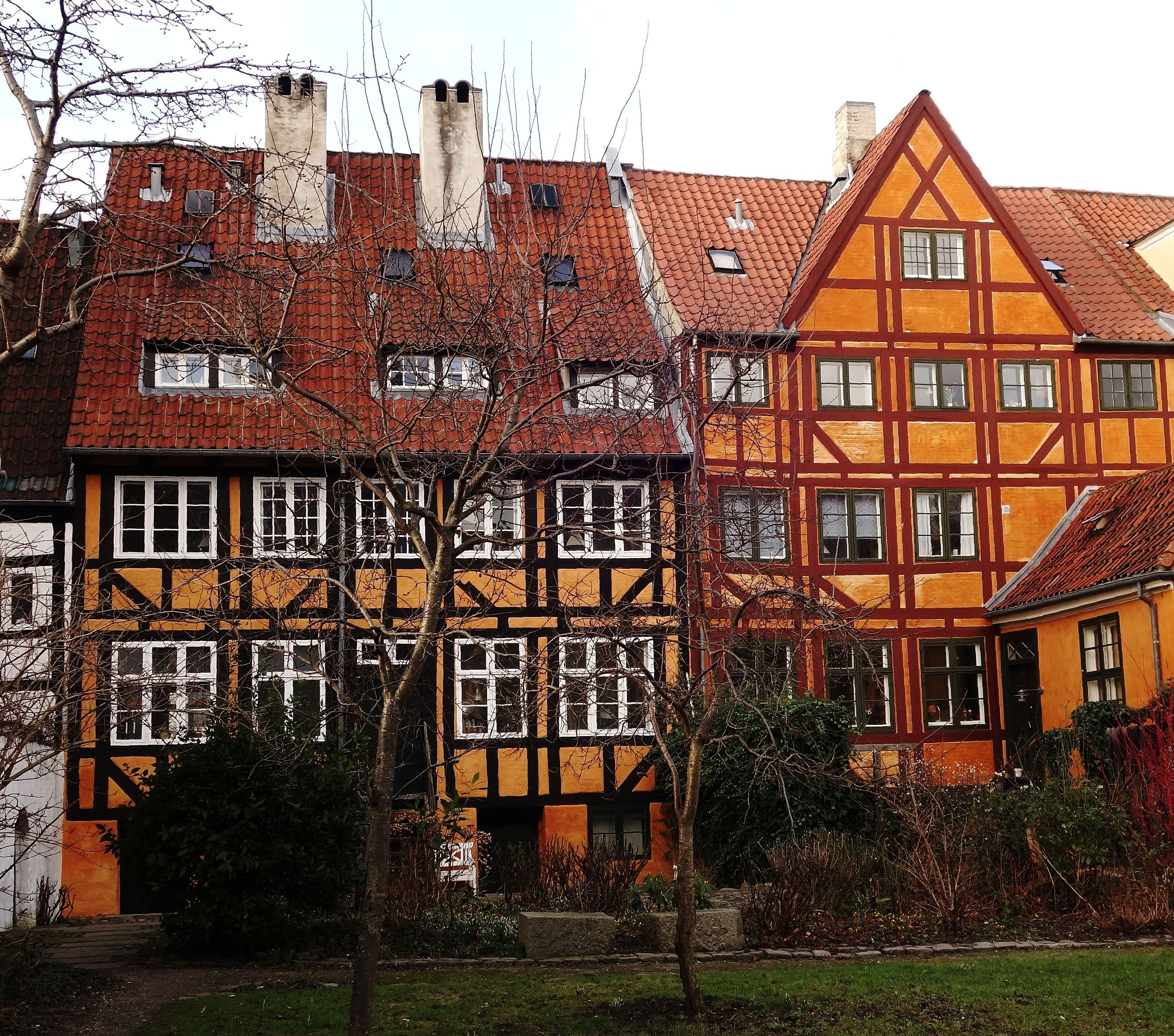
The rear side of the building seen to the left. The building to the right is Overgaden Oven Vandet 26.

Overgaden Oven Vamdet 24 is a two-storey building constructed in brick with pinkish brown lime paint finish towards the street and timber framing on the other sides. The five-bays-wide facade is crowned by a three-bay gabled wall dormer. The gable is finished with a white-painted cornice with cornice returns. A small round opening above the now glazed hatch in the gable was originally the site of a pulley. The main entrance in the centre of the facade is raised a few steps from street level. The red-painted door is topped by a large transom window. The two basement entrances are located in the two outer bays. The red tile roof is pierced by two chimneys. The yard side of the building has black-tarred timber framing and brick infills with yellow lime paint finish. The green-painted door is also on this side of the building flanked by two basement entrances.

== Today ==
The property was owned by Peter Rasmussen in 2008. It contains two apartments on the ground floor and a single apartment on each of the upper floors.
