= Wildersgade 15 =

Listed building in Copenhagen

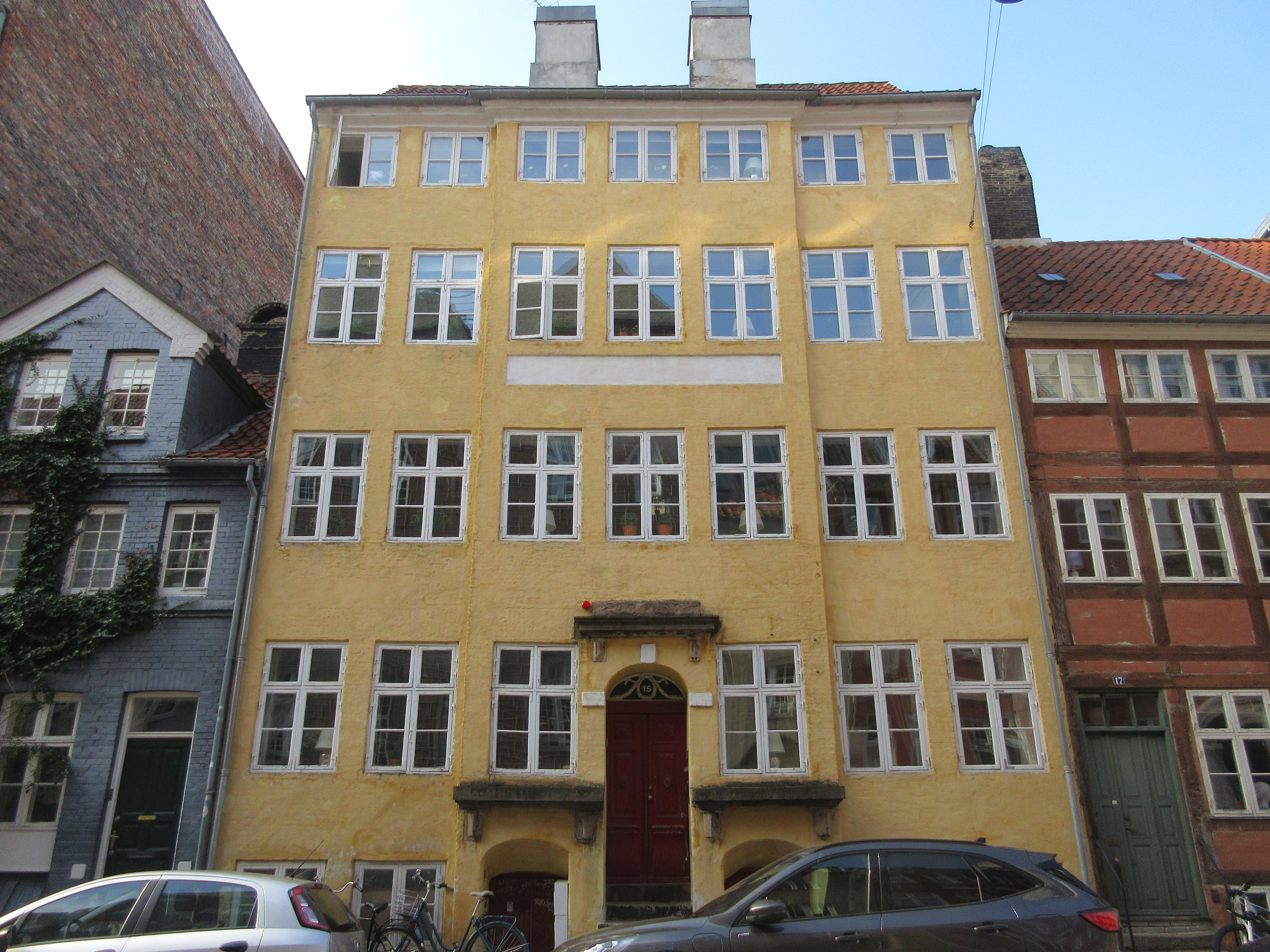
- Interactive map of the Wildersgade 15 area

General information
- Location: Copenhagen, Denmark
- Coordinates: 55°40′21.94″N 12°35′21.19″E
- Completed: 1667
- Renovated: 1748, 2000s

Wildersgade 15 is an 18th-century property situated on Wildersgade in the Christianshavn district of central Copenhagen, Denmark. It was listed in the Danish registry of protected buildings and places in 1964. It is now owned by Folketinget and contains eight apartments available to MPs from the provinces.

== History ==
=== 18th century ===
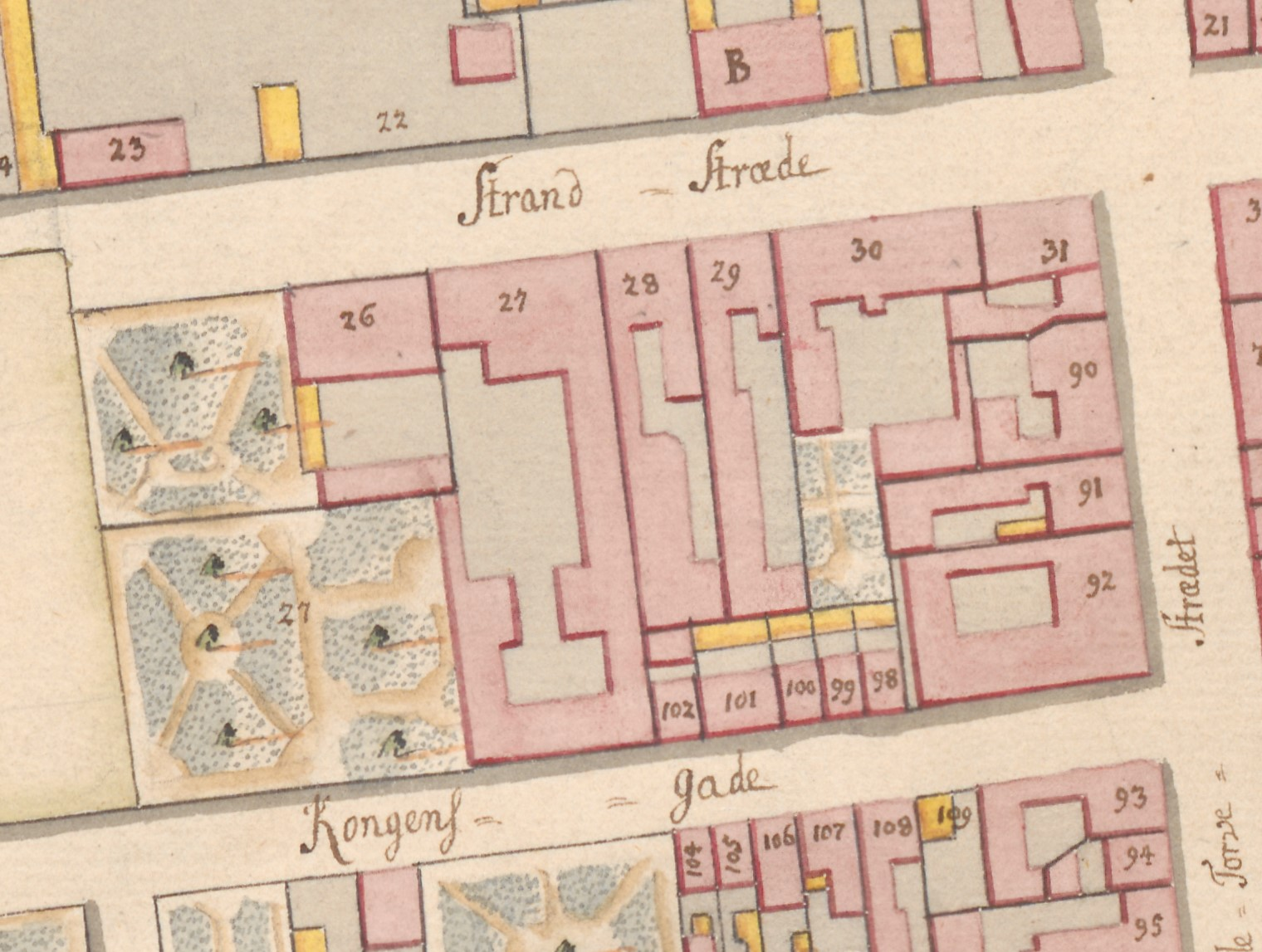
No. 101 seen on a detail from Christian Gedde's map of Christianshavn Quarter, 1757.

The site was originally part of a much larger property. It was listed as No. 14 in Copenhagen's first cadastre of 1689 and was at that time owned by Frederik Møller. It was later divided into several smaller properties. The property now known as Wildersgade 15 was listed as No. 101 in the new cadastre of 1756. It was at that time owned by tailor Even Isaksen.

The present building on the site was constructed in 1778. The property was home to 43 residents in 10 households at the 1787 census. Karl Gotfrid Vurzen, an artillery lieutenant, resided in the building with three colleaguesand two other lodgers. Hans Peder Pentzler, a master gardener, resided in the building with his wife Maria Stavanger, their one-year-old daughter Magdalene, his mother-in-law Magdalene Stavanger and his sister-in-law Johanne. Andreas Asbiørn, a carpenter, resided in the building with his wife Ane Barbra, their three children (aged one to nine), one maid and one lodger. Thomas Andersen, a ship carpenter, resided in the building with his widowed sister Ane Thomas Datter, his 17-year-old niece and one lodger. J. Thomsem Beck, a helmsman sailing on the Danish West Indies, resided in the building with his wife Bodel Christians Datter. Most of the other residents were widows and their children.

=== 19th century ===
The property was listed as No. 62 in the new cadastre of 1806. It was at that time owned by textile merchant C. M. Tychsen.

The property was home to 48 residents in 14 households at the 1840 census.

Ole Olsen, a vankiersvend, resided on the ground floor with his wife Ane Jørgensen and one maid. Christina Due, a 44-year-old man living from his means, resided alone in one of the first floor apartments. Christian Brandt, a music teacher, resided in the other first floor apartment with his wife Sophia Sønderskov. Jens Olsen Riberholdt, a courier at the Danish Asiatic Company, resided on one of the second floor apartments with his wife Karen Magrethe Espersen, their three children (aged five to 13), one maid and one lodger (sailor). Andreas Due, a helmsman, resided in the other second floor apartment with his wife Elisabet Vest and their four children (aged two to nine). Sven Steen, another helmsman, resided on the third floor with his wife Oline Ploue and one lodger. Niels Poulsen, a workman, resided in the basement with his wife Trine Poulsen, their two children (aged nine and 16) and one lodger. Niels Petersen, a retailer of milk and cream, resided in the basement with his wife Lovise Birkholm, their two children (aged two and five) and the wife's sister Nicoline Birkholm. Peter Andersen, a workman, resided on the ground floor of the rear wing with his wife Kirsten Olsdatter and their two-year-old son. Marie Nicoline Ammelandt, a 62-year-old widow, resided on the ground floor of the rear wing with her daughter Johanne Caroline Ammelandt. Silver Johnsen, a workman, resided on the first floor of the rear wing with his wife Christiane Frederikke Hansen and one lodger. Elisabet Jørgensen and Bente Olsen, two widow laundry ladies, both of them in their 70s, resided together on the first floor of the rear wing. Sophie Dorthea Hansen, a 43-year-old widow needleworker, resided on the second floor of the rear wing with her two children (aged 10 and 16). Anders Jensen, a workman, resided on the second floor of the rear wing with his wife Karen Kierstine and their one-year-old daughter.

The property was adapted in 1849. The property was home to 77 residents at the 1860 census. The residents included a helmsman and a master shioemaker. Most of the other residents were craftsmen or worked other low-income jobs.

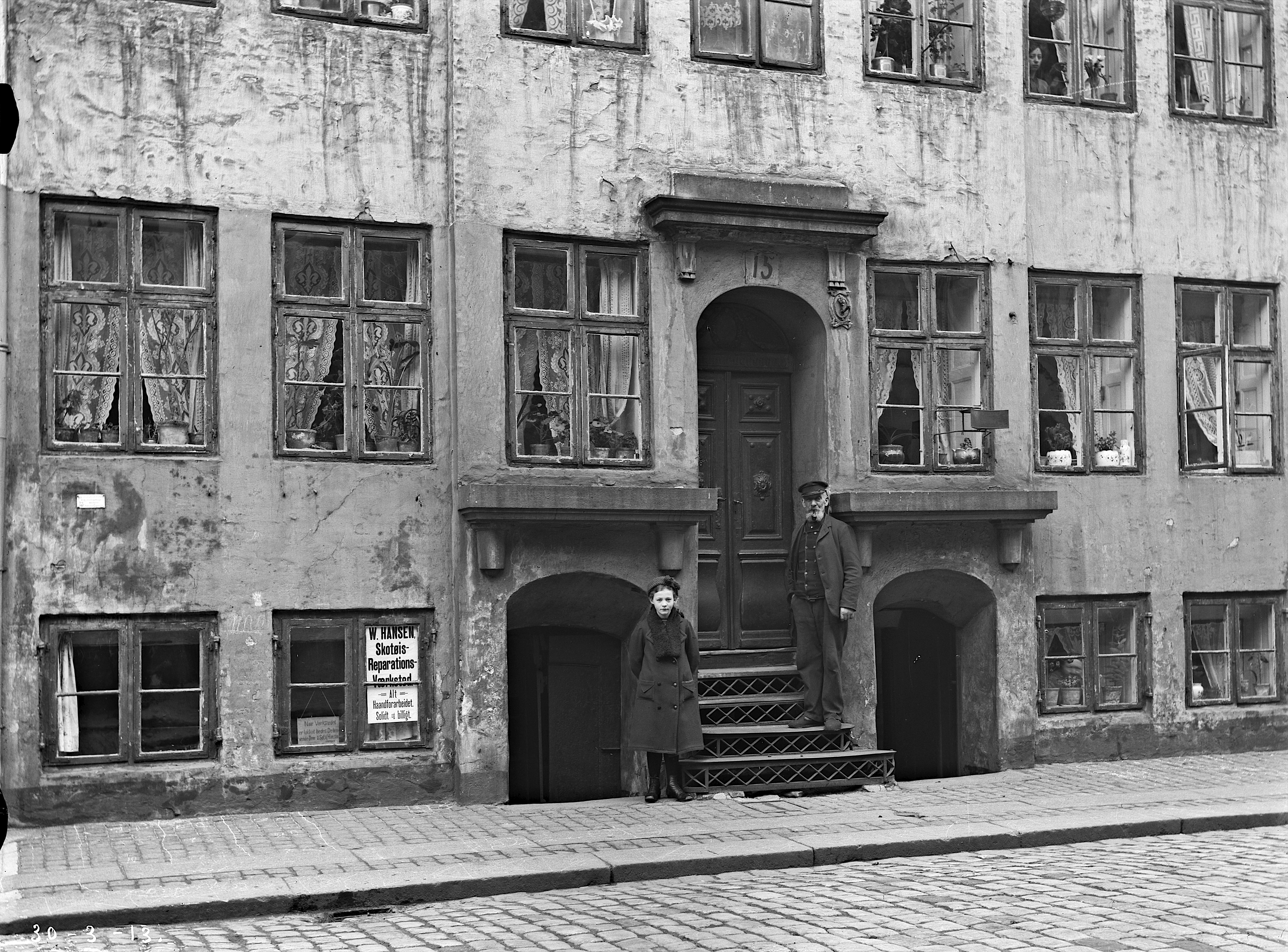
Wildersgade 15 in 1913.

The number of residents had dropped to 50 at the 1880 census. Claus Frederik Schumann, a master carpenter, resided on the ground floor with his wife Anna Margrethe Schumannm, their 29-year-old daughter Anna Claudine Schumann (teacher) and their 25-year-old son Benjamin Schumann (litographer). Christen Peter Jensen, a workman, resided on the ground floor with his wife Scharlotte Jensen. Antoni Lorentzi Schmidt, a shoemaker, resided on the first floor with his wife Karen Magrethe Schmidt and their nine-year-old daughter Maria Anna Schmidt. His shop was located in the basement. Joakim Eibeschütz, a master building painter, resided on the first floor with his wife Dorthea Eibeschütz. Niels Peter Nielsen, a cooper, was also resident on the first floor. David Emanuell Rasmussen, a turner, resided on the second floor with his wife Ane Christine Rasmussen and their two children (aged 17 and 19). Scharlotte Ømann, a 53-year-old widow needleworker, resided on the second floor with her 30-year-old son (shoemaker). Johan Henrik Petersen, a machinist, resided on the third floor with his wife Anna Viktoria Petersen and their three children (aged one to four). Clara Nielsen and Karoline Paasche, rwo widows employed with needlework, were also resident of the third floor. Caroline Marie Sørensen, a widow employed at a tobacco factory, resided on the ground floor of the rear wing. Emilie Sofie Holm, a widow, resided on the ground floor of the rear wing with her son Theodor Holm. Karoline Bentzen, a 65-year-old widow, resided on the ground floor of the rear wing with her 44-year-old daughter Karoline Emilie Busch (needleworker). Anna Marie Larsen, a bookprinter, resided on the first floor of the rear wing with three lodgers. Hansine Mortensen, a just 28-year-old widow laundry woman and needleworker, resided on the second floor of the rear wing with her two children (aged one and three) and one lodger. Edvard Dinesen, a smith, resided on the third floor of the rear wing with his wife Henriette Dinesen and their three children (aged one to 15). Juliane Schrøder, a 60-year-old widow, resided on the third floor of the rear wing with her daughter Olga Vilhelmine Salling and one-year-old granddaughter.

== Architecture ==
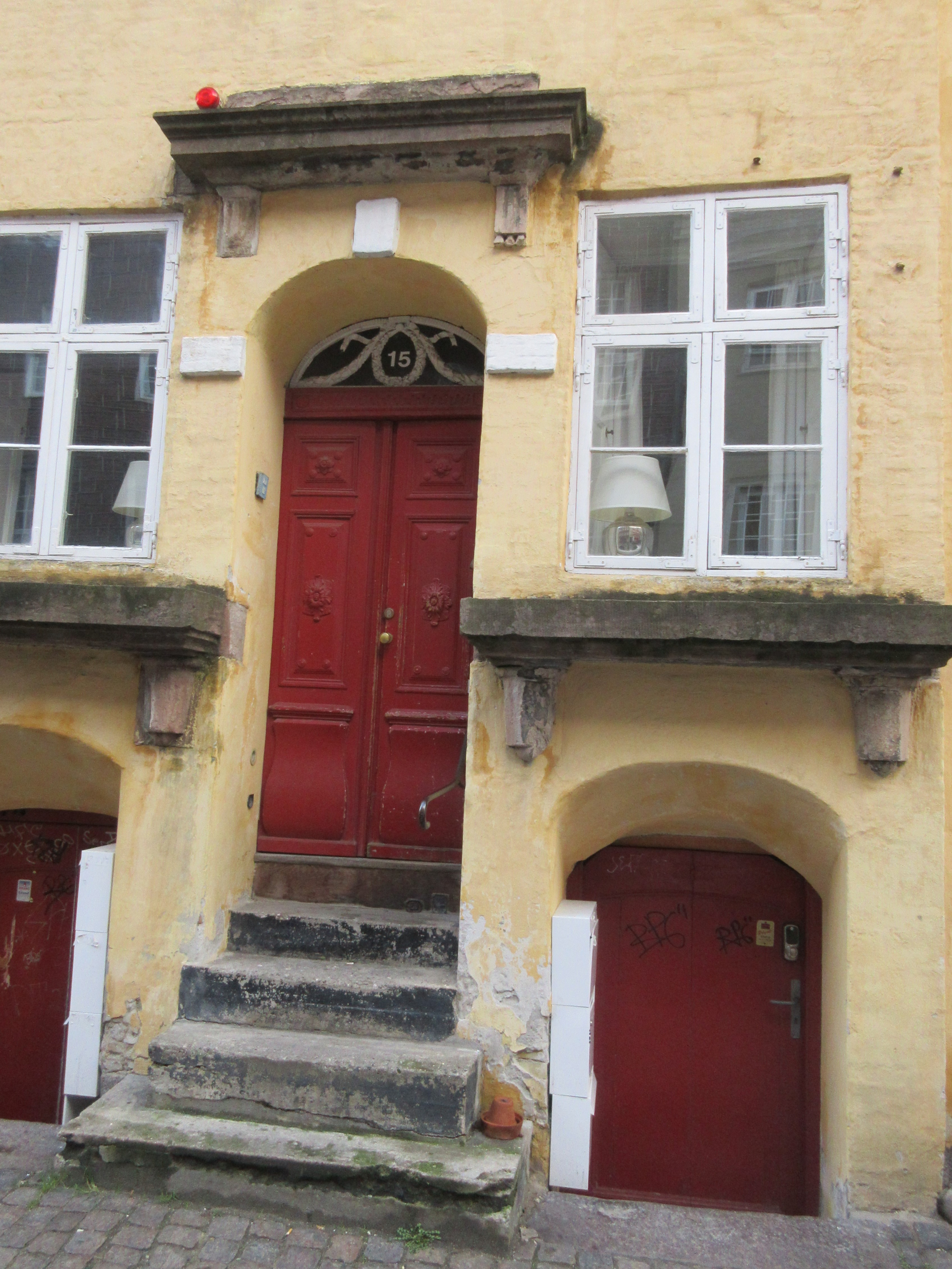
The main entrance..

The building is constructed with four storeys over a walk-out basement. The seven-bays wide facade has a slightly projecting three-bay median risalit. It is rendered in a pale yellow colour. A decorative frieze is seen between the three central windows of the second and third floors. The tall, arched main entrance in the central bay is raised a few steps from street level. It is flanked by two basement entrances. All three entrances are topped by hood moulds supported by corbels. The pitched red tile roof is pierced by two robust chimneys. The building was listed in the Danish registry of protected buildings and places in 1964.

== Today ==
In the 2000s, Walls renovated the building. It contains eight 44-square metre apartments. In 2009, Golketinge purchased the building for DKK 11,500,000. The apartments are now available to MPs from the provinces.
