= Gerling House =

Listed building in Copenhagen

Strandgade 38
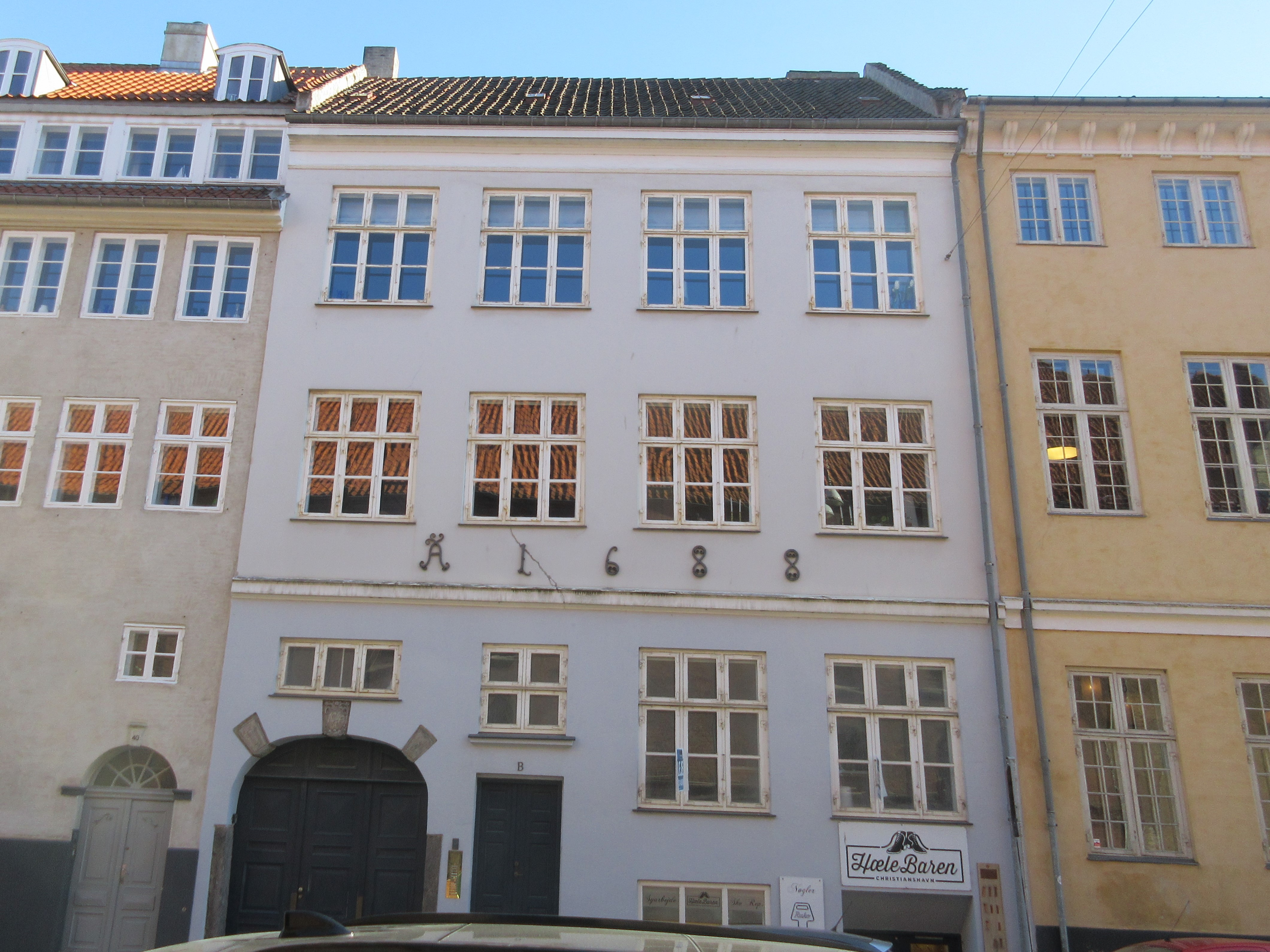
- Interactive map of the Strandgade 38 area

General information
- Location: Copenhagen, Denmark
- Coordinates: 55°40′28.99″N 12°35′28.5″E
- Completed: 1688

The Gerling House (Danish: Gerlings Gård) is a late 17th-century building complex situated at Strandgade 38 in the Christianshavn district of central Copenhagen, Denmark. It consists of a three-storey, four-bays-wide front wing towards the street and a 13-bays-long two-storey side wing on its rear. The master cooper Peter Richter established a cooper's workshop in the building in the 1830s and the property was after his death owned by his widow until 1880. The building was listed in the Danish registry of protected buildings and places in 1918. Notable former residents include the naval officer and painter Sophus Schack.

== History ==
=== 18th century ===
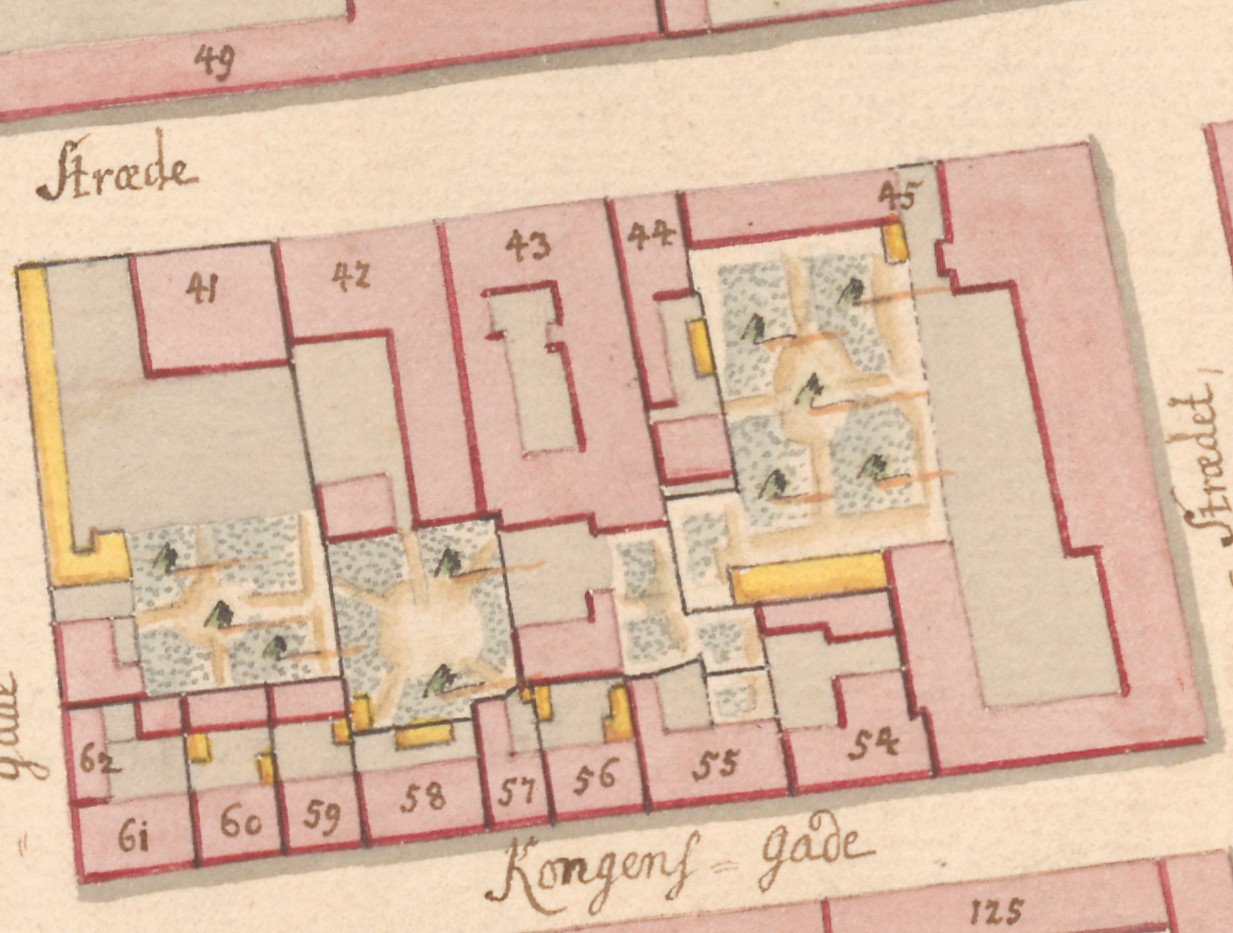
No. 43 seen in a detail from Christian Gedde's map of Christianshavn Quarter, 1757

Strandgade 38 and Strandgade 40 were originally part of the same property. This large property was listed in Copenhagen's first cadastre of 1689 as No. 26 in Christianshavn Quarter, owned by brewer Niels Sørensen. The present building on the site was already constructed in 1688. It was then a two-storey building with a facade crowned by a gabled wall dormer.

The property was listed in the new cadastre of 1756 as No. 43, owned by ropemaker Johan Jensen.

=== Florentince Meyer Buch ===
The property was later divided into two properties. No. 43 A (now Strandgade 38) was home to 25 residents at the time of the 1787 census. Florentine Meyer (Buch), widow of a ropemaker, resided in the building with one maid and one male servant. Lorentz Teff, a man without employment, resided in the building with his wife Ancini Cathrina, their two children (aged two and three) and his brother Nicolay Teff. Jens Andersen Hammer, a master smith at Holmen, resided in the building with his wife Ana Dorthea and their two daughters. Poul Andersen Hvedberg, a ship carpenter, resided in the building with his wife Magreth Nicolays Datter. Carl Engelbret, another ship carpenter, resided in the building with his wife Maren Hans Datter and their two children (aged two and five). Jans Mads. Lund, another ship carpenter, resided in the building with his wife Lucia Jens Datter. Jørgen Jørgensen, a ship carpenter, resided in the building with his wife Ana Susana. Hans Nielsen Møller, another ship carpenter, resided in the building with his wife Abelone Mortens Datter.

No. 43A was home to 24 residents in six households at the 1801 census. Florentine Buch, widow of a ropemaker, resided in the building with one maid. Peder Pedersen, a concierge, resided in the building with his wife Anne Elisabeth Pedersen and their three children (aged one to six). Jens Hansen, a workman, resided in the building with his wife Elisabeth Hansen, cooper Peder Christian Bensen, Bensen's wife Kirstine Christensdatter, their one-year-old son and the widow Kirstine Hillebrandt. John T. Ullestad, another workman, resided in the building with his wife Caroline Lindberg and their two children (aged two and four). Niels C. Lindegaard, a barkeeper, resided in the building with his wife Anne Susanne (Lindegaard) and their two children (aged four and 13). Søren Severii, a workman, resided in the building with Thor Nielsen and their son Thor Nielsen.

=== Anton Toxværd and Hans Caspersen ===
No. 43 A was listed in the new cadastre of 1806 listed as No. 38 in Christianshavn Quarter. It was owned by ropemaker Anton Toxværd at that time. Anton Toxværd (1754-1815) was already the owner of another property in Vrogade. He was married to Anna Elisabeth Lewerents (1778-1838, his third wife). He was a captain in the Civilian Artillery (later major).

The small property on the other side of the block (1756: No. 55) was listed in the new cadastre of 1806 as No. 77, owned by master joiner Andreas Bergmann. These two properties were the same year informally merged as No. No. 39 & 77. The property was later acquired by anchor smith Hans Caspersen. He used it as an extension of his extensive workshops. In 1818, he constructed a new building towards Kongensgade (now Wildersgade 55). In 1820, he also purchased a portion of the adjacent property No. 38 (now Strandgade 40). His property was from then on registered as No. 38 B, 39 & 77.

=== Richter family, 1834–1880s ===
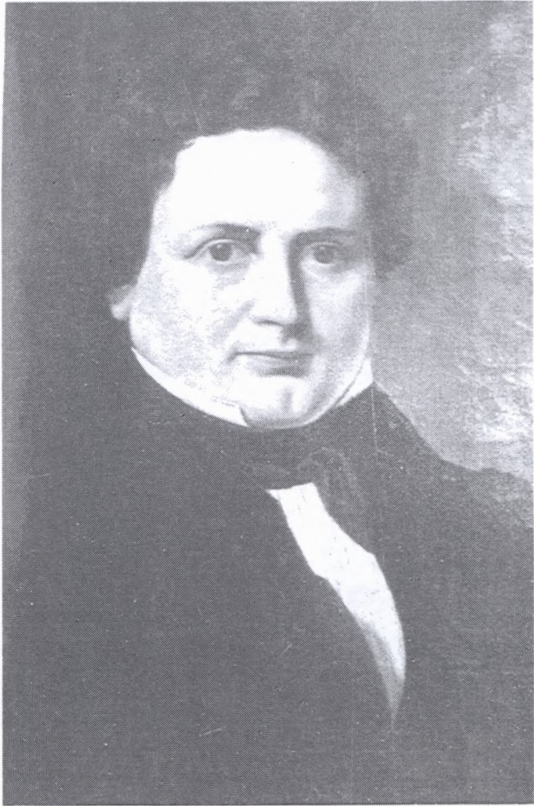
Peter Richter (1794-1846)

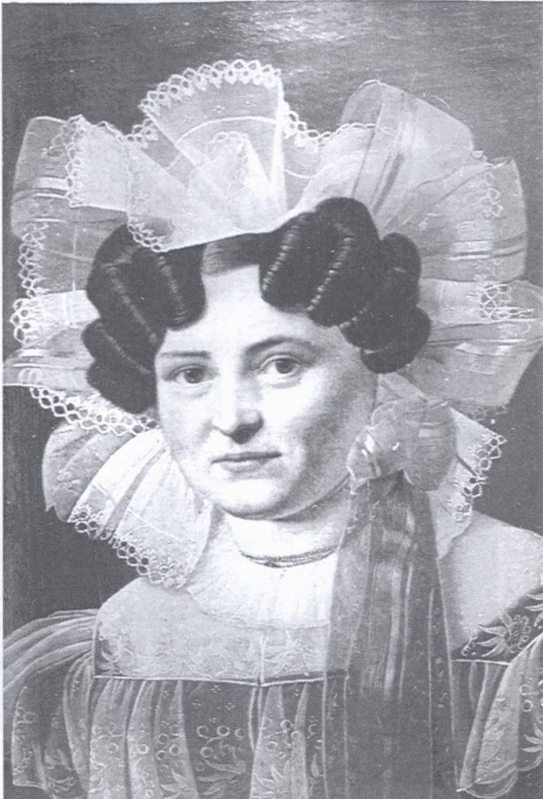
Johanne Elisabeth Richter, née Lange (1796-1880)

In 1834, Peter Richter (1794-1846) established a cooper's workshop in the building. With the many trading houses, shipping companies and breweries in its immediate vicinity, it was an ideal location for a cooper's shop. Richter had already been licensed as a master cooper in 1818. His workshop had initially been located in Sankt Pederstræde and then in Torvegade. It prospered in its new location in Strandgade and he was, after a while, able to buy the building.

Richter's property was home to 46 residents in six households at the 1840 census. Peter Richter resided on the ground floor with his wife Johanne Elisabet Richter (née Lange), their nine children (aged one to 21), five coopers, four cooper's apprentices and two maids. Johannes Møller, a schoolmaster, resided on the first floor with his wife Sophie Amalia Bernhardt, their 10-year-old foster son Wilhelm Jensen, their 31-year-old teacher Augusta Løser, senior lieutenant in the 2nd Jutland Regiment Sophus Schack and one maid. Søren Andersen, a brewery worker (bryggersvend), resided in the basement with his wife Ane Marie Christine Lassen, their two children (aged six and 14) and one lodger. Mathias Holsted, another brewery worker (bryggerknægt), resided in the side wing with his wife Hanne Casse and their 10-year-old son. Christian Gothlob Vagner, a weaver (væversvend), resided on the first floor of the side wing with his wife Chatrine Amalie Bjerring, their two children (aged one and three), chief mate (overstyrmand) Johan Christopher Bjerring (lodger, possibly the wife's brother) and his eight-year-old daughter. Hendrik Andreas Schwede, a master shoemaker, resided on the second floor of the side wing with his wife Hedwick Sophia Svendsen, two foster children and one lodger.

Peter Richter Sr. died in 1846. The cooper's work was then continued by his son Peter Richter Jr. He was married but had no children. He died just 38 years old in 1850. Hanne Elisabet Richter (née Lange) remained the owner of the building until at least the mid-1850s. Her daughter Hanne Regine (1828–80) married civil servant Johannes Joseph Bergmann Treschow. They resided in the mother's building in Strandgade in 1855.

The property was home to 37 residents at the 1860 census. Johanne Elisabeth Richter (née Lange) resided in the front wing with four of her daughters, a lodger (language teacher) and one cooper (employee). Christian Frederik Theodor Schou, an infantry captain, resided on the first floor with his wife Anna Charlotte Schouw f. Paulsen and one maid. Christen Nielsen, a barkeeper, resided in the front wing with his wife Ane Marie Nielsen (née Møller), their four children (aged two to nine) and two maids.

Johan Marthin Petersen, a master cooper, resided on the first floor of the side wing with his wife Inger Christine Petersen (née Olsen), their four children (aged one to 10), his mother and one maid. Eight cooper's apprentices resided together on the ground floor of the side wing. Niels Rasmussen, a caretaker, resided on the second floor with his wife Maren Kirstine Rasmussen (née Andersen) and their two-year-old daughter. Rasmussen f. Andersen

The property was home to 30 residents in six households at the 1880 census. Johan Marius Petersen, a master cooper, resided on the first floor of the front wing with his wife Inger Kirstine Petersen, their four children (aged 13 to 22) and one maid. Johan Frederik Borvall, a master shoemaker, resided on the ground floor of the front wing with his wife Anna Cathrine Borvall, their 31-year-old daughter Hans Wiegardt, four lodgers and two guests. Søren Jensen, a barkeeper, resided in the basement with his housekeeper and her three-year-old son. Johan Vilhelm Nielsen, a cooper (Petersen's employee), resided on the ground floor of the side wing with his wife Petrea Margrethe Nielsen, their three-year-old son Ludvig Hans Peter Nielsen, his brother-in-law Jørgen Johan Nielsen, a cooper's apprentice and Petersen's coachman Niels Jørgensen. Svend Hansen, a workman, resided on the first floor of the side wing with his wife Ane Sophie Hansen, their 11-year-old daughter and one lodger. Lars Jensen, a coachman (haulier), resided on the second floor of the side wing with his wife Johanne Jensen and three children (aged five to 12).

=== 20th century ===
In 1908, Strandgade 38 was heightened with one storey. Wildersgade 55 (now as No. 509, Christianshavn Quarter) was at the same time turned once again turned into a separate property.

== Architecture ==
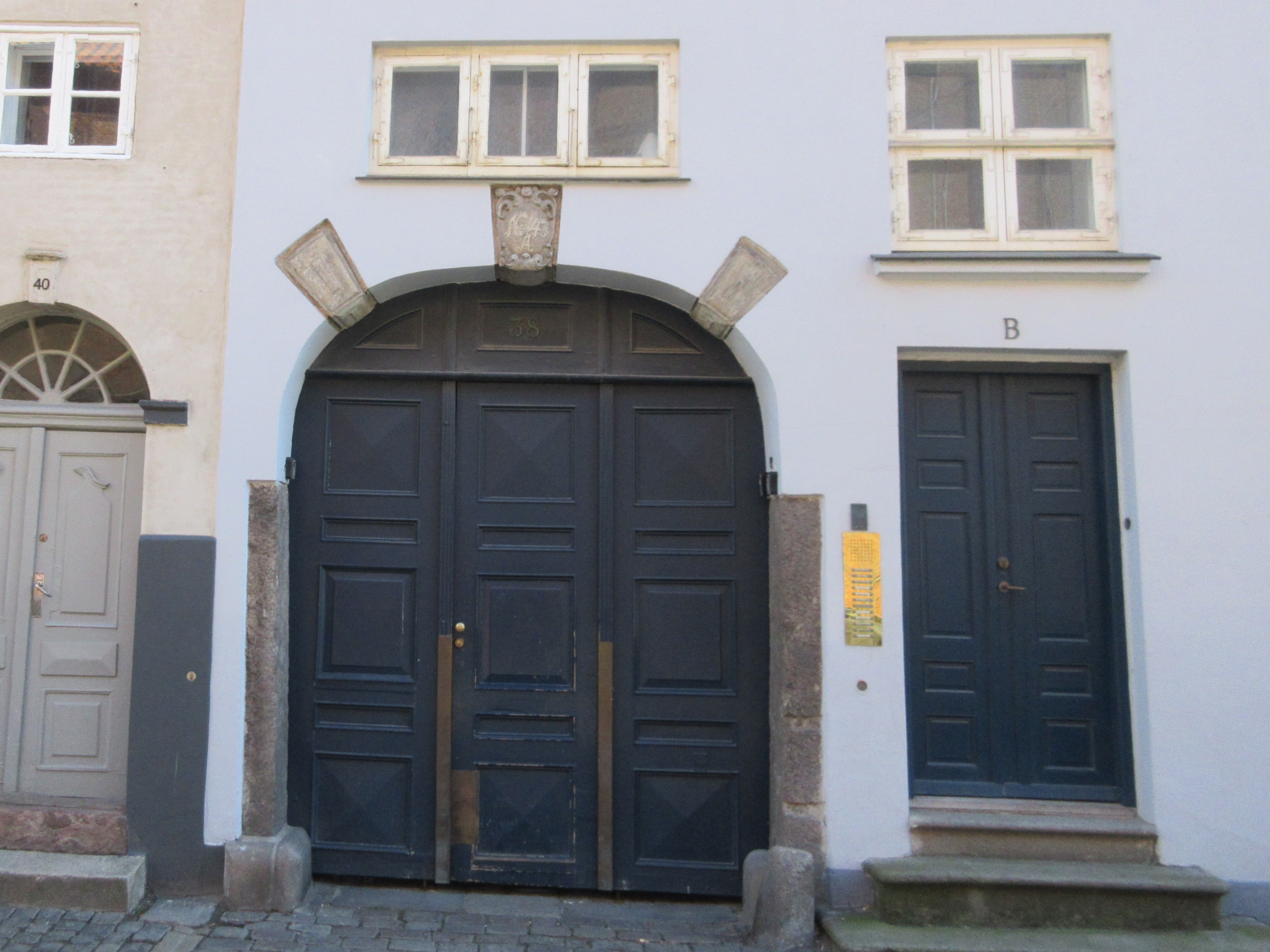
The gate

The front wing is constructed with three storeys over a walk-out basement. The four-bays-wide facade is plastered and grey-painted. It is finished with a cornice belt above the ground floor and a robust cornice below the roof. The construction year "1688" is written on the facade in wall anchors. The gate is located in the bay farthest to the right. The keystone is decorated with a relief. The main entrance to the front wing is located in the second bay from the left. The basement entrance is located in the bay furthest to the right. The roof is clad in red tiles. A 13-bays-long, two-storey side wing extends from the rear side of the building. It shares the courtyard with Strandgade 40.

== Today ==
The building is owned by Droob Aps. The front wing contains a single apartment on each of the three floors. The side wing also contains a single apartment on each of its two floors. The first bay of the side wing is part of the apartment in the front wing.
