= Listed buildings in Christianshavn =

This is a list of listed buildings in Christianshavn, Copenhagen, Denmark.

== List ==
| Listing name | Image | Location | Coordinates | Description |
|---|---|---|---|---|
| Christiania: Aircondition | | Norddyssen 61, 1441 København K | 55°40′46.97″N 12°36′46.31″E | Gunpowder magazine in Dyssen's 2md redan from 1789 |
| Christiania: Aircondition | | Norddyssen 61A, 1441 København K | 55°40′47.13″N 12°36′46.96″E | Guardhouse in Dyssen's 2md redan from 1789 |
| Christiania: Autogena | | Midtdyssen 51, 1441 København K | 55°40′36.4″N 12°36′40.76″E | Gunpowder magazine in Dyssen's 3rd redan from 1780 |
| Christiania: Autogena | | Midtdyssen 53, 1441 København K | 55°40′36.52″N 12°36′41.54″E | Guardhouse in Dyssen's 3rd redan from 1780 |
| Christiania: Powder Magazine at Carls Bastion | | Refshalevej 70, 1432 København K | 55°40′43.69″N 12°36′35.27″E | Former powder magazine 1690 by Hans van Steenwinckel the Youngest |
| Christiania: Powder Magazine at Frederiks Bastion | | Refshalevej 80, 1432 København K | 55°40′53.33″N 12°36′38.17″E | Former powder magazine from 1744 to 1745 by C.E.D. von Oetken |
| Christianshavns Vold | | Langebrogade 4, 1411 København K | | Former storage building inside Kalvebod Bastion from c. 1800 |
| Christianshavns Vold | | Langebrogade 4, 1411 København K | | Former forge inside Kalvebod Bastion from 1757 |
| Christianshavns Vold | | Langebrogade 10, 1400 København K | | Gunpowder magazine from c. 1750 inside Enhjørningens Bastion |
| Christianshavns Vold | | Torvegade 75, 1400 København K | | The demolished Amager Gate's guardhouse from 1718 to 1720 |
| Christianshavns Vold | | Torvegade 79, 1400 København K | | Amagerbros Ravelin's Bomhus from 1728 |
| Christianshavns Vold | | Christianshavns Voldgade 50, 1424 København K | | Lille Mølle: Stub mill (mill cap removed in c. 1893) which was converted into a private residence in 1918 |
| Christianshavns Vold | | Christianshavns Voldgade 52, 1424 København K | | |
| Christianshavns Vold | | Christianshavns Voldgade 54, 1424 København K | | Steam mill from 1832 |
| Christianshavns Vold | | Krudtløbsvej 8, 1439 København K | | Gunpowder magazine from1744-45 by C.E.D. von Oetken inside Charlotte Amalies Bastion |
| Christianshavns Vold | | Refshalevej 110, 1432 København K | | Half-timbered building at Quinti Lynette |
| Christianshavns Vold | | Refshalevej 110, 1432 København K | | Brick building at Quinti Lynette |
| Dronningensgade 11 | | Dronningensgade 11, 1414 København K | 55°40′14.3″N 12°35′22.31″E | Townhouse from c. 1783 |
| Dronningensgade 13 | | Dronningensgade 13, 1414 København K | 55°40′14.45″N 12°35′22.63″E | Townhouse from c. 1875 with older cellar and extended with an extra floor in 1844 |
| Dronningensgade 14 | | Dronningensgade 14, 1414 København K | 55°40′14.19″N 12°35′23.64″E | Townhouse from c. 1734 |
| Dronningensgade 15 | | Dronningensgade 15, 1414 København K | 55°40′14.63″N 12°35′22.94″E | Townhouse from 1775 to 1776 |
| Dronningensgade 21 | | Dronningensgade 21, 1414 København K | 55°40′15.17″N 12°35′23.81″E | Townhouse from 1775 to 1776 |
| Holmen | | Arsenalvej 2, 1436 København K | 1863 | Værftbrovagten: The eastern guardhouse from 1863 designed by J. G. Zinn |
| Holmen | | Bohlendachvej 4A, 1437 København K | | Bohlendachhuset; Half-timbered building |
| Holmen | | Galionsvej 33, 1437 København K | | Søndre Masteskure: One-storey building |
| Holmen | | Galionsvej 41, 1437 København K | | Søndre Mersehus: Two-storey building |
| Holmen | | Galionsvej 40, 1437 København K | | Søndre Hovedmagasin (20): Former storage building |
| Holmen | | Danneskiold-Samsøes Allé 1, 1434 København K | | Kuglegården (5) |
| Holmen | | Danneskiold-Samsøes Allé 41, 1434 København K | | Beklædningsmagasinet: Three-storey building from 1999 |
| Holmen | | Philip De Langes Allé 3, 1434 København K | | Gymnastik- og eEksercerhuset from 1999 |
| Holmen | | Philip De Langes Allé 9A, 1434 København K | | Modelsamlingsbygningen: Three-storey building from 1999 |
| Holmen | | Danneskiold-Samsøes Allé 51, 1434 København K | | Grov- og kleinsmedjen: Three-storey building from 1999 |
| Holmen | | Danneskiold-Samsøes Allé 54, 1434 København K | | Kabysse- og vandkassemagasin: Three-storey building from 1999 |
| Holmen | | Danneskiold-Samsøes Allé 55, 1434 København K | | Nordre Kedelsmedie og Elværk: Three-storey building from 1999 |
| Holmen | | Leo Mathisens Vej 1, 1434 København K | | Kobbersmedjen: One-storey building |
| Holmen | | Takkeladsvej 1, 1434 København K | | Vestre Takkelagehus: Eastern part of Vestre Takkelagehus |
| Holmen | | Takkeladsvej 7, 1434 København K | | Vestre Takkelagehus: Western part of Vestre Takkelagehus |
| Holmen | | Spanteloftvej 10, 1434 København K | | Office building attached to Østre Takkelagehu |
| Holmen | | Ved Søminegraven 1, 1434 København K | | Østre Takkelagehus |
| Holmen | | Spanteloftvej 12, 1434 København K | | Spanteloftsbygningen |
| Holmen | | A.H. Vedels Plads 6, 1439 København K | 1738 | Arresthuset: Jailhouse from 1890 designed by C.T. Andersen |
| Holmen | | A.H. Vedels Plads 8, 1439 København K | 1910 | Naval Barracks from 1908 to 1910 designed by V. Birkmand |
| Holmen | | Ved Sixtusbatteriet 1, 1439 København K | 1910 | Naval Barracks from 1908 to 1910 designed by V. Birkmand |
| Holmen | | A.H. Vedels Plads 16, 1439 København K | 1738 | Pavilion |
| Holmen | | Ved Sixtusbatteriet 1, 1439 København K | 1799 | Schrødersee Monument on the Sixtus Battery from 1797 to 1799 designed by Caspar Frederik Harsdorff |
| Holmen | | Margretheholmsvej 18, 1432 København K | 1745 | Hovedvagten: Guardhouse from 1744 to 1745 designed by Philip de Lange |
| Holmen | | A.H. Vedels Plads 20, 1439 København K | 1764 | Planbygningen from 1763 to 1764 designed by Philip de Lange |
| Holmen | | A.H. Vedels Plads 22, 1439 København K | 1751 | Mastekranen: Masting sheer from 1751 designed by Philip de Lange |
| Holmen | | Margretheholmsvej 2, 1432 København K | 1921 | Hangar H; Former hangar from 1921 |
| Holmen | | Dokøen, 1437 København K | | Dokøen: Cranes |
| Holmen | | Dokøen, 1437 København K | | Dokøen: Cranes |
| Langebrogade 8 | | Langebrogade 8, 1411 København K | 55°40′12.58″N 12°36′10.07″E | Three-storey double house from 1802-1814 |
| Overgaden Neden Vandet 11: Heering House | | Overgaden Neden Vandet 11, 1414 København K | 55°40′19.96″N 12°35′23.14″E | Townhouse from 1785 possibly designed by Georg Erdman Rosenberg and five bays of an extension from c. 1804 |
| Overgaden Neden Vandet 11: Heering House | | Overgaden Neden Vandet 11, 1414 København K | 55°40′19.96″N 12°35′23.14″E | Three-storey extension of the southwestern side wing |
| Overgaden Neden Vandet 11: Heering House | | Overgaden Neden Vandet 11, 1414 København K | 55°40′20.32″N 12°35′21.26″E | Buildings alæng the southwestern side of the courtyard from 1759 |
| Overgaden Neden Vandet 15 | | Overgaden Neden Vandet 15, 1414 København K | 55°40′20.42″N 12°35′23.86″E | Building with side wing from 1858 |
| Overgaden Neden Vandet 15 | | Overgaden Neden Vandet 15A, 1414 København K | 55°40′20.86″N 12°35′23.03″E | Rear wing from the beginning of the 19th century which was adapted in 1961 |
| Overgaden Neden Vandet 19: Three warehouses | | Overgaden Neden Vandet 19A, 1414 København K | 55°40′21.07″N 12°35′25.04″E | Former warehouse |
| Overgaden Neden Vandet 19: Three warehouses | | Overgaden Neden Vandet 19C, 1414 København K | 55°40′21.47″N 12°35′24.86″E | Former warehouse |
| Overgaden Neden Vandet 19: Three warehouses | | Overgaden Neden Vandet 19D, 1414 København K | 55°40′21.36″N 12°35′25.4″E | Former warehouse |
| Overgaden Neden Vandet 31 | | Overgaden Neden Vandet 31, 1414 København K | 55°40′23.16″N 12°35′28.46″E | Five-bay canal house with two-storey wall dormer and rear wing from 1746 to 1747 |
| Overgaden Neden Vandet 33: Hans Caspersen House | | Overgaden Neden Vandet 33, 1414 København K | 55°40′23.48″N 12°35′28.9″E | Seven-bay house from c. 1740, height increased in 1783 |
| Overgaden neden Vandet 37: Overgaden Neden Vandet 37 | | Overgaden Neden Vandet 37, 1414 København K | 55°40′24.02″N 12°35′29.83″E | Canal house with two-storey wall dormer and rear wing from c. 1750 |
| Overgaden Neden Vandet 39: Hans Caspersen House | | Overgaden Neden Vandet 39, 1414 København K | 55°40′24.31″N 12°35′30.34″E | Canal house from 1770 |
| Overgaden Neden Vandet 45-47: Snorrebroens Pakhus | | Overgaden Neden Vandet 45, 1414 København K | 55°40′25.54″N 12°35′32.24″E | Snorrebroens Pakhus: Two identical warehouses from 1799 to 1801 |
| Overgaden oven Vandet 6: Stanley House | | Overgaden Oven Vandet 6, 1415 København K | | Townhouse from 1755, possibly designed by Simon Carl Stanley |
| Overgaden Oven Vandet 8 | | Overgaden Oven Vandet 8, 1415 København K | | Corner building from the 18th century |
| Overgaden Oven Vandet 10: Brøste House | | Overgaden Oven Vandet 10, 1415 København K | 1785 | Townhouse from 1785 |
| Overgaden oven Vandet 12-14 | | Overgaden Oven Vandet 12, 1415 København K | 1797 | House from 1797 |
| Overgaden oven Vandet 16 | | Overgaden Oven Vandet 16, 1415 København K | 1797 | House from the 17th century and later with facade altered in 1957 |
| Overgaden oven Vandet 18 | | Overgaden Oven Vandet 18, 1415 København K | 1802 | House from 1802 |
| Overgaden Oven Vandet 20 | | Overgaden Oven Vandet 20, 1415 København K | 1802 | House from 1802 |
| Overgaden Oven Vandet 22 | | Overgaden Oven Vandet 22, 1415 København K | | House dating from c. 1650 but the facade altered in c. 1800 |
| Overgaden Oven Vandet 24 | | Overgaden Oven Vandet 24, 1415 København K | C. 1730 | House from c. 1730 |
| Overgaden Oven Vandet 26 | | Overgaden Oven Vandet 26, 1415 København K | C. 1750 | House from c. 1750 |
| Overgaden Oven Vandet 28 | | Overgaden Oven Vandet 28, 1415 København K | C. 1730 | House and attached five-bay building from c. 1730 |
| Overgaden Oven Vandet 32A: Steinfass House | | Overgaden Oven Vandet 32A, 1415 København K | c. 1770 | Townhouse from c. 1770 |
| Overgaden Oven Vandet 50: Hans Caspersen House | | Overgaden Oven Vandet 50, 1415 København K | 55°40′25.72″N 12°35′37.1″E | House from 1769 and c. 1850 |
| Overgaden Oven Vandet 52 | | Overgaden Oven Vandet 52, 1415 København K | | House from 1772 (height increased in 1886) with side wings to the north and south |
| Overgaden Oven Vandet 54 | | Overgaden Oven Vandet 54, 1415 København K | | House with two side wings from 1745, rebuilt in 1846 |
| Overgaden oven Vandet 56 | | Overgaden Oven Vandet 54, 1415 København K | | Corner building from the 18th century |
| Søkvæsthuset | | Overgaden Oven Vandet 58A, 1415 København K | 1781 | The Bådmandsstræde wing: Five-storey wing on Bådmandsstræde from 1780 to 1781 af Johan Bernhardt Schottmann |
| Søkvæsthuset | | Overgaden Oven Vandet 60A, 1415 København K | | Small building to the south |
| Søkvæsthuset | | Overgaden Oven Vandet 60B, 1415 København K | 1756 | The main wing on Overgaden from 1754 to 1755 by Johan Christian Conradi |
| Søkvæsthuset | | Overgaden Oven Vandet 62C, 1415 København K | 1779 | Heiberg's House: Garden house from 1779 by Georg Erdman Rosenberg, rebuilt after a fire in 1838 |
| Søkvæsthuset | | Overgaden Oven Vandet 64, 1415 København K | 1843 | Small building to the north |
| Prinsessegade 7A | | Prinsessegade 7A, 1422 København K | 55°40′16.02″N 12°35′30.4″E | House from 1769 |
| Prinsessegade 18 | | Prinsessegade 18, 1422 København K | 55°40′15.89″N 12°35′31.9″E | House from 1785 |
| Prinsessegade 52 | | Prinsessegade 52, 1422 København K | 55°40′21.12″N 12°35′41.11″E | House from c. 1750 possibly designed by Johan Christian Conradi (extended lengthwise in 1783 and heightwise in 1833) and attached wing from 1857 |
| Prinsessegade 54; Philip de Lange House | | Prinsessegade 54, 1422 København K | 55°40′21.74″N 12°35′42.33″E | Two-storey detached house located in a courtyard; built by Philip de Lange for his own use in the 1750s |
| Sankt Annæ Gade 3 B | | Sankt Annæ Gade 3B, 1416 København K | 55°40′27.11″N 12°35′28.19″E | Six-bay house and attached wing from the 18th century |
| Sankt Annæ Gade 4 | | Sankt Annæ Gade 4A, 1416 København K | 55°40′26.74″N 12°35′27.38″E | Two-storey, 12-bay house from 1622 to 1624 |
| Sankt Annæ Gade 6 and Wildersgade 45 | | Sankt Annæ Gade 6, 1416 København K | 55°40′26.45″N 12°35′27.97″E | Corner building and two attached wings from 1847 to 1848 |
| Sankt Annæ Gade 10 | | Sankt Annæ Gade 10, 1416 København K | 55°40′25.77″N 12°35′29.23″E | House from c. 1750 |
| Sankt Annæ Gade 12 | | Sankt Annæ Gade 12, 1416 København K | 55°40′25.65″N 12°35′29.45″E | House from before 1779 |
| Sankt Annæ Gade 14 | | Sankt Annæ Gade 14, 1416 København K | 55°40′25.53″N 12°35′29.65″E | House from c. 1540 |
| Sankt Annæ Gade 16 | | Sankt Annæ Gade 16, 1416 København K | 55°40′25.4″N 12°35′29.86″E | House from before 753 |
| Sankt Annæ Gade 18: Hans Burmand House | | Sankt Annæ Gade 18, 1416 København K | 55°40′25.28″N 12°35′30.09″E | House from c. 1759 |
| Sankt Annæ Gade 20–22 | | Sankt Annæ Gade 221416 København K | 55°40′24.97″N 12°35′30.68″E | Corner building from 1804 which was rebuilt in 1860 |
| Sofiegade Public Baths | | Sofiegade 15A, 1418 København K | 55°40′15.56″N 12°35′27.67″E | Former public wash house from 1909 designed by city architect Hans Wright |
| Strandgade 4 and 4 B | | Strandgade 4B, 1401 København K | 55°40′22.15″N 12°35′17.3″E | Warehouse from the 1780s, extended to its current height in 1874 |
| Strandgade 4 and 4 B | | Strandgade 4, 1401 København K | 55°40′21.56″N 12°35′16.4″E | Jacob Holm House: Residential building from 1789 |
| Strandgade 6: Lehn House (2) | | Strandgade 6, 1401 København K | 55°40′22.67″N 12°35′18.13″E | Townhouse from 1703, altered in c, 1850. Pavilion from 1743 |
| Strandgade 6: Lehn House (2) | | Strandgade 6, 1401 København K | 55°40′22.67″N 12°35′18.13″E | Townhouse from 1703, altered in c, 1850. Pavilion from 1743 |
| Strandgade 8 | | Strandgade 8A, 1401 København K | 55°40′38.65″N 12°35′49.42″E | |
| Strandgade 10; Schottmann House | | Strandgade 10, 1414 København K | 55°40′23.29″N 12°35′19.12″E | Townhouse from 1668 which was rebuilt in 1775 by Johan Bernhardt Schottmann with side wing, a half timbered building and a rear wing |
| Strandgade 10; Schottmann House | | Strandgade 10, 1414 København K | 55°40′23.29″N 12°35′19.12″E | Townhouse from 1668 which was rebuilt in 1775 by Johan Bernhardt Schottmann with side wing, a half timbered building and a rear wing |
| Strandgade 12: Jennow House | | Strandgade 12, 1401 København K | 55°40′23.66″N 12°35′19.73″E | Residential building |
| Strandgade 14: Rhode House | | Strandgade 14, 1401 København K | 55°40′24.16″N 12°35′20.46″E | Townhouse from c. 1640, altered and extended with two extra floors in 1794 |
| Strandgade 22: Cort Adeler House | | Strandgade 22, 1401 København K | 55°40′25.64″N 12°35′22.88″E | Townhouse from c. 1630 which was rebuilt in 1670 and extended with an extra floor in 1769 as well as a new wing from 1769 and a wall |
| Strandgade 24 | | Strandgade 24, 1401 København K | 55°40′25.84″N 12°35′23.33″E | Residential complex from 1670, extended with an extra floor in 1748 |
| Strandgade 25: Asiatisk Kompagni | | Strandgade 25, 1401 København K | 1738 | Former headquarters of Asiatisk Kompagni from 1738 by Philip de Lange |
| Strandgade 25: Asiatisk Kompagni | | Strandgade 25, 1401 København K | 1781 | Building from 1781 identical to the building from 1781, the wall with gateway that connects them and an attached warehouse which is also from 1781 |
| Strandgade 25: Asiatisk Kompagni | | Strandgade 25, 1401 København K | 1738 | Eigtved Warehouse: 21-bay warehouse from 1750 by Niels Eigtved |
| Strandgade 26: Behagen House | | Strandgade 26, 1401 København K | 55°40′26.41″N 12°35′24.22″E | Two buildings from 126 which were rebuilt and connected in 1758 as well as a wall and two pillars in the courtyard |
| Strandgade 28–30: Sigvert Grubbe House and Strandgade 30 | | Strandgade 28, 1401 København K | 55°40′26.78″N 12°35′24.72″E | Sigvert Grubbe House. Gabled townhouse from 1622 |
| Strandgade 28–30: Sigvert Grubbe House and Strandgade 30 | | Strandgade 30, 1401 København K | 55°40′27.07″N 12°35′27.04″E | Townhouse from c. 1635 with gate from 1710 and two attached wings of which the northeastern dates from 1636 and the southwestern dates from 1709 to 1713 |
| Strandgade 28–30: Sigvert Grubbe House and Strandgade 30 | | Wildersgade 41, 1408 København K | 55°40′25.53″N 12°35′25.18″E | Townhouse and two attached buildings to the rear, one of them being and eight-bay building with timber framing |
| Strandgade 28–30: Sigvert Grubbe House and Strandgade 30 | | Wildersgade 43, 1408 København K | 55°40′25.81″N 12°35′27.47″E | Townhouse and attached three-storey warehouse from c. 1800 |
| Strandgade 32: Mikkel Vibe House | | Strandgade 32, 1401 København K | 55°40′27.42″N 12°35′25.82″E | House consisting of a wing on Strandgade probably from 1624 with alterations from 1816 and 1839 and a wing on Sankt Annæ Gade from c. 1622–24 as well as a rear wing |
| Strandgade 34: Topp House | | Strandgade 34, 1401 København K | 55°40′28.22″N 12°35′27.11″E | House from 1733 |
| Strandgade 34: Topp House | | Sankt Annæ Gade 1A, 1416 København K | 55°40′27.76″N 12°35′27.02″E | Warehouse from 1777 to 1778 |
| Strandgade 36: Niels Brock House | | Strandgade 36, 1401 København K | 55°40′28.75″N 12°35′27.86″E | Residential complex from 1780 and later and a warehouse fronting Wildersgade |
| Strandgade 38: Gerling House | | Strandgade 38, 1401 København K | 55°40′29″N 12°35′28.51″E | Residential building from 1688 with later alterations |
| Strandgade 40 | | Strandgade 40, 1401 København K | 55°40′29.25″N 12°35′28.72″E | Residential building from the 17th century and 1780 |
| Strandgade 42 | | Strandgade 42, 1401 København K | 55°40′29.43″N 12°35′29.02″E | Two-winged residential building from the 17th century and 1780–1800 |
| Strandgade 44: Old Artillery Barracks (3) | | Strandgade 44A, B and H, 1401 København K | c. 1664 | Merchant house from c. 1664, later converted into artillery barrack and altered several times, booth in 1775 and later |
| Strandgade 44: Old Artillery Barracks (3) | | Strandgade 44B, B and H, 1401 København K | c. 1664 | Merchant house from c. 1664, later converted into artillery barrack and altered several times, booth in 1775 and later |
| Strandgade 44: Old Artillery Barracks (3) | | Strandgade 44H, B and H, 1401 København K | c. 1664 | Merchant house from c. 1664, later converted into artillery barrack and altered several times, booth in 1775 and later |
| Strandgade 46: Andreas Bjørn House | | Strandgade 46, 1401 København K | 55°40′31.05″N 12°35′31.75″E | House built for Andreas Bjørn on Strandgade in 1733–34 (gate from c. 1760) and Bådsmandsstræde built in 1761 extended with extra flor in 1830 |
| Strandgade 52-54 | | Strandgade 52–54, 1401 København K | 55°40′32.96″N 12°35′34.74″E | Two-sotey building from c. 1741 by Andreas Bjørn |
| Strandgade 104–106: Grønlandske Handels Plads | | Strandgade 89, 1401 København K | 1767 | North Atlantic House: 22 bay long warehouse from 1766 to 1767 by Johan Christian Conradi |
| Strandgade 104–106: Grønlandske Handels Plads | | Strandgade 104, 1401 København K | 1806 | Skindpakhuset: Former warehouse from 1805 to 1806 |
| Strandgade 104–106: Grønlandske Handels Plads | | Strandgade 106, 1401 København K | 1781 | ""Det brede Pakhus"", or ""Det store Bakkehus"": Former warehouse from 1781 |
| Torvegade 22 | | Torvegade 22, 1400 København K | 55°40′23.76″N 12°35′21.81″E | House from the 17th century with two attached buildings in the courtyard |
| Torvegade 24 | | Torvegade 24, 1400 København K | 55°40′22.55″N 12°35′23.33″E | House from 1793 which was rebuilt in about 1900 and a staircase tower from 1793 formerly part of two buildings in the courtyard |
| Torvegade 28 | | Torvegade 28, 1400 København K | 55°40′23.55″N 12°35′22.09″E | (ca. 1700) which was rebuilt in 1852 as well as building on Wildersgade (No. 26) from 1782–91 which was increased in height in 1852 with two wings in the courtyard from 1777–82 |
| Torvegade 30 | | Torvegade 30, 1400 København K | 55°40′22.55″N 12°35′24.09″E | House fronting the street from 1769 |
| Torvegade 30 | | Torvegade 30, 1400 København K | 55°40′22.55″N 12°35′24.09″E | Building in the courtyard from before 1729 which was rebuilt before 1838 |
| Torvegade 32 | | Torvegade 32, 1400 København K | 55°40′22.39″N 12°35′24.34″E | House from 1756 to 1757 which was expanded with extra height in 1846 |
| Treschows Stiftelse | | Overgaden Oven Vandet 76, 1415 København K | 55°40′29.63″N 12°35′47.26″E | Residential building from 1863 |
| Treschows Stiftelse | | Overgaden Oven Vandet 80, 1415 København K | 55°40′28.97″N 12°35′48.13″E | Residential building from 1857 |
| Wilders Plads 10 | | Wilders Plads 7, 1403 København K | 55°40′31.59″N 12°35′36.58″E | Half-timbered house from 1736 |
| Wildersgade 15 | | Wildersgade 15, 1408 København K | 55°40′21.95″N 12°35′21.21″E | Townhouse from c. 1778 |
| Wildersgade 17 | | Wildersgade 17, 1408 København K | 55°40′22.13″N 12°35′21.49″E | Late 18th-century townhouse with small staircase house |
| Wildersgade 19 | | Wildersgade 19, 1408 København K | 55°40′22.27″N 12°35′21.67″E | Late 18th-century townhouse fwhich was rebuilt in c. 1850 |
| Wildersgade 20 and Overgaden Neden Vandet 17 | | Overgaden Neden Vandet 17, 1414 København K | 55°40′20.75″N 12°35′24.43″E | Townhouse from 1790 |
| Wildersgade 20 and Overgaden Neden Vandet 17 | | Wildersgade 20, 1408 København K | 55°40′21.8″N 12°35′22.25″E | Building on Overgaden and a small building which connects it to the building on Wildersgade from 1887 by Frederik Bøttger |
| Wildersgade 34 | | Wildersgade 34, 1408 København K | 55°40′23.98″N 12°35′25.73″E | Two townhouses from 1764 which were expanded with extra height in 1780 and a northeastern rear wing. |
| Wildersgade 36 | | Wildersgade 36, 1408 København K | 55°40′24.27″N 12°35′26.22″E | Townhouse from c. 1725, a rear wing from c. 1780 by Johan Bernhardt Schottmann and a gallery which was closed in connection with a rebuilding in 1832. |
| Wildersgade 37 | | Wildersgade 37, 1408 København K | 55°40′24.82″N 12°35′25.82″E | Residential building fronting the street: Originally two houses from the early 18th century which were merged into one building in 1750, heightened in 1776 an altered with new façade decorations in 1850–1900. It also comprises a rear wing from 1776 which was shortened in 1978). |
| Wildersgade 40 | | Wildersgade 40, 1408 København K | 55°40′24.64″N 12°35′26.83″E | House originallt from 1728 but the front rebuilt in brick and expanded with two extra floors in 1798 |
| Wildersgade 46 | | Wildersgade 46, 1408 København K | 55°40′25.1″N 12°35′27.61″E | Townhouse originally from 1760 but extended heightwise in 1801 and an attached side wing |
| Wildersgade 49 | | Wildersgade 49, 1408 København K | 55°40′27.02″N 12°35′29.42″E | Townhouse dating from some time between 1783 and 1801 |
| Wildersgade 52 | | Wildersgade 52, 1408 København K | 55°40′25.88″N 12°35′28.88″E | House and rear wing from c. 1700 |
| Wildersgade 53 | | Wildersgade 53, 1408 København K | 55°40′27.92″N 12°35′30.9″E | House from 1631 which was altered and expanded with an extra floor in 1776 |
| Wildersgade 58 | | Wildersgade 59, 1408 København K | 55°40′26.69″N 12°35′30.13″E | House from the early 18th century |
| Wildersgade 64-66 | | Wildersgade 64, 1408 København K | 55°40′28.18″N 12°35′32.63″E | Warehouse from before 1725 which was altered in 1794 and again in 1884 |
| Wildersgade Barracks | | Wildersgade 60A, 1408 København K | 55°40′26.72″N 12°35′34.15″E | Former barracks from 1902 by Jørgen Henrich Rawert, small gate wing and single-storey wing to the left of it |
| Wildersgade Barracks | | Overgaden Neden Vandet 49A, 1414 København K | 55°40′26.99″N 12°35′34.54″E | Former warehouse and wall and gatehouse |
| Wildersgade Barracks | | Overgaden Neden Vandet 49B, 1414 København K | 55°40′27.11″N 12°35′31.2″E | Former warehouse and the low building on the corner of Bådsmandsstræde |
