= Sankt Annæ Gade 20–22 =

Listed building in Copenhagen

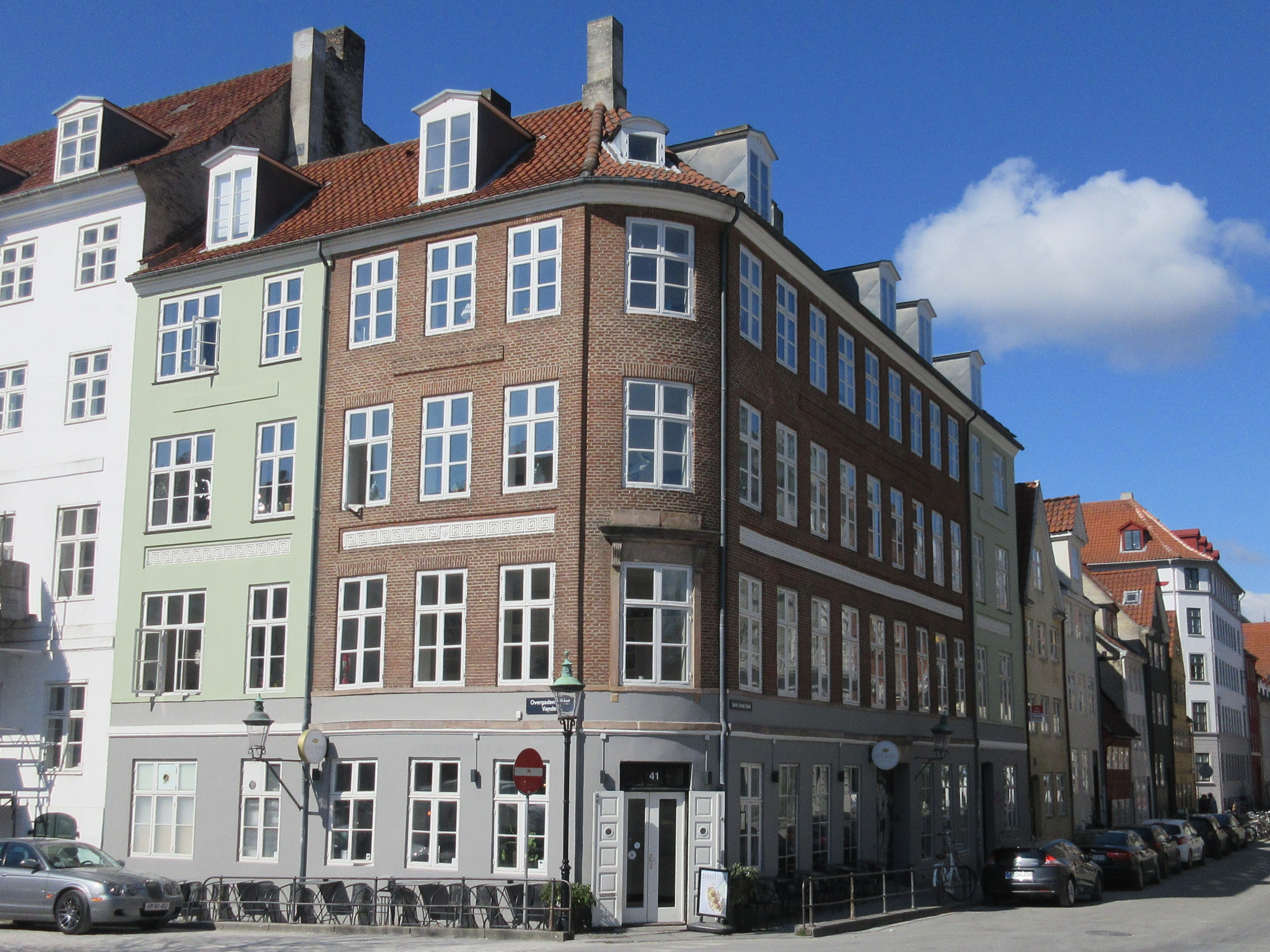
- Interactive map of the Sankt Annæ Gade 20–22 area

General information
- Location: Copenhagen, Denmark
- Coordinates: 55°40′24.96″N 12°35′30.7″E
- Completed: 1804

Sankt Annæ Gade 20–22 is a complex of Neoclassical buildings situated at the corner of Sankt Annæ Gade and Christianshavns Kanal in the Christianshavn neighborhood of central Copenhagen, Denmark. The current complex consists of a corner building from 1804, flanked by two just two-bays-wide older buildings, both of which were adapted in connection with the construction of the corner building. The entire complex was jointly listed in the Danish registry of protected buildings and places in 1950. The courtyard on the rear was redesigned by landscape architect Jeppe Aagaard Andersen in the 1980s.

== See also ==
- Kringlegangen
