= Overgaden Oven Vandet 22 =

Listed building in Copenhagen

Overgaden Oven Vamdet 22
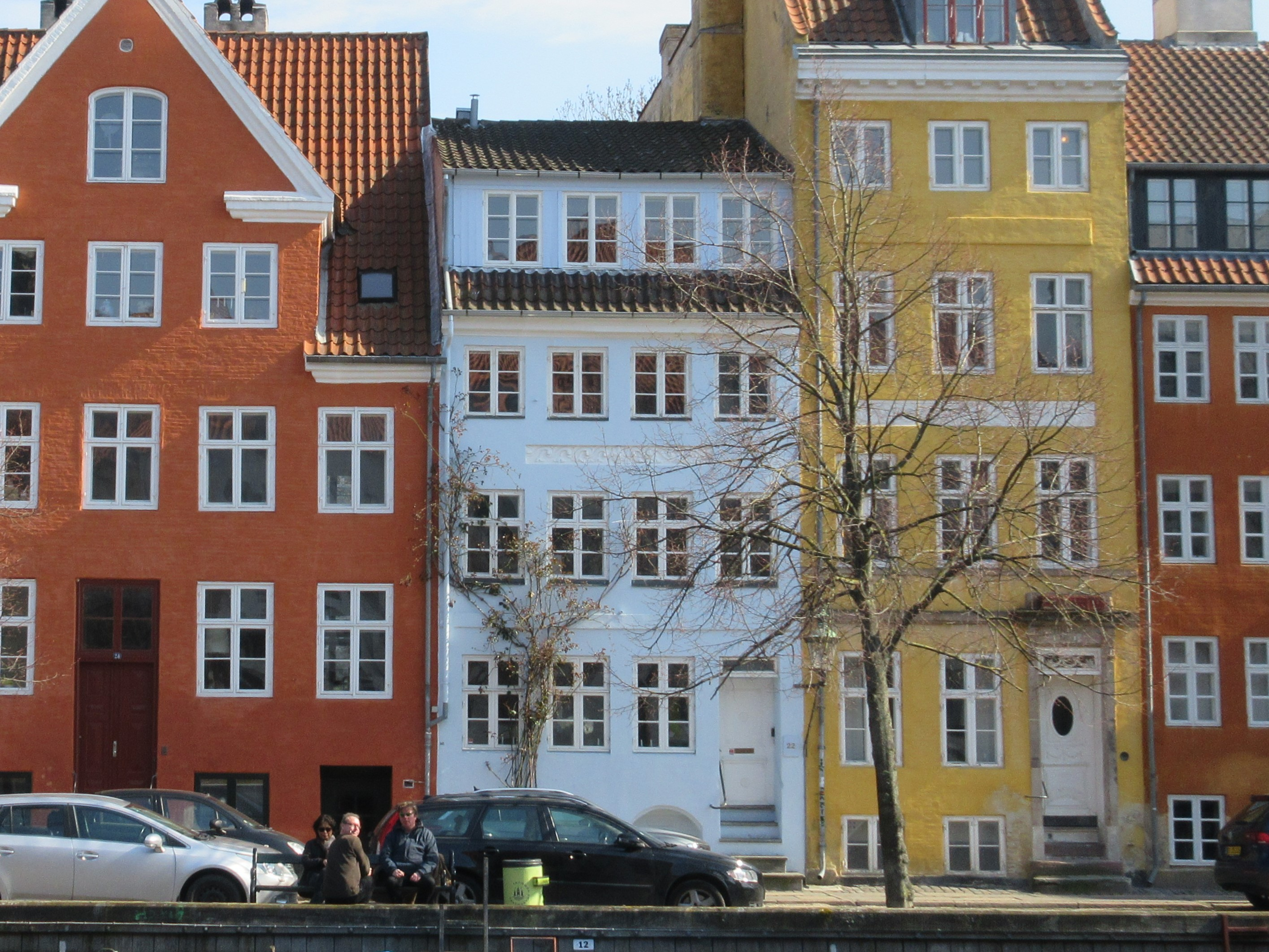
- Interactive map of the Overgaden Oven Vamdet 22 area

General information
- Architectural style: J. D. Backhausen
- Location: Copenhagen, Denmark
- Coordinates: 55°40′15.85″N 12°35′20.72″E
- Completed: c. 1650
- Inaugurated: 1786 (heightened), 1800 (facade)

Overgaden Oven Vamdet 22 is a 17th-century building overlooking Christianshavn Canak in the Christianshavn neighbourhood of central Copenhagen, Denmark. It was listed in the Danish registry of protected buildings and places in 1945.

== History ==
=== 17th and 18th centuries ===
The site was originally part of a large Lot, No. 37, comprising presen-day Overgaden Oven Vandet 12–22 and Dronningensgade 9–15, which was ceded to renteskriver Anders Olufsen. By 1635, it had been built over with low rows of tenement houses towards both streets. By 167 the house row along the canal had been adapted into six more prominent townhouses. The houses were timberframed, two storeys tall and four bays wide, with brick basements and adjoining gables. The main entrances were arranged in pairs under a shared gabled wall dormer. The houses were over time subject to various changes. The half-timbered facades were reconstructed in brick and the buildings were also heightened. The houses were owned by skippers and came with a private berth along the quay.

The property now known as Overgaden Oven Vandet 22 was acquired by Christopher Jagenreuter in 1679. He was married to Catharina Bargs. Their property was Copenhagen's first cadastre from 1689 as No. 106 in Christianshavn Quarter. Catharina Jagenreuter (née Bargs) died as a widow in 1694. On 17 December 1697, their children sold the property for 200 eigsdaler to skipper Jørgen Hansen.

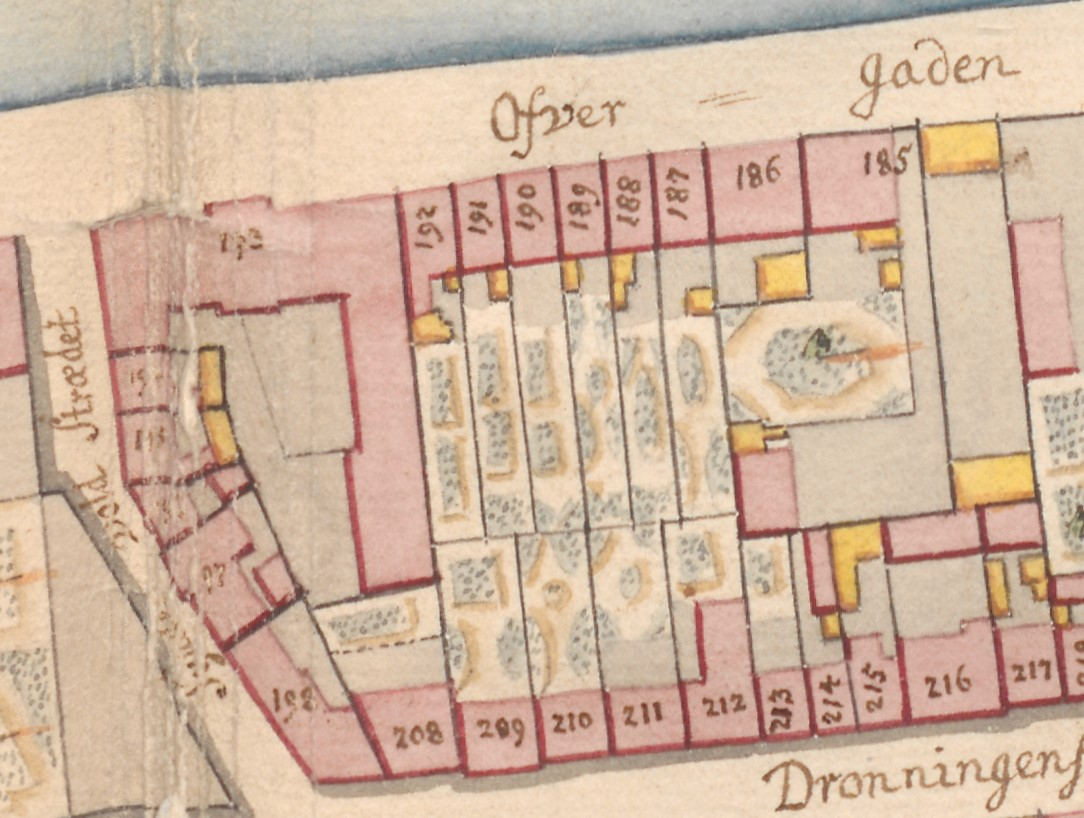
No. 187 seen on a detail from Christian Gedde's map of Christianshavn Quarter, 1757.

The property was listed in the new cadastre of 1756 as No. 187, owned by one captain Sommerschild (probably Peter Henrich Sommerschiel, 1681–1761).

The property was later owned by skipper Friderich Dirch Boyesen, He heightened the building with one storey ijn 1786. At the time of the 1787 census, Boysen lived in the building with his wife Ane Meyden, 30year-old Henreie Everslund, 12-year-old Johane Cathrine Werle ("a poor daughter of a soldier") and one maid.

=== Peter Hansen Koch ===
In 1797, Peter Hansen Koch (1745-1817) became the owner of the property through his marriage to the widow of the previous owner.

Kock was originally from Flensburg. He had for many years worked for some of the large trading houses in Christianshavn, including Tutein and Iselin & Co. He had served as captain on 16 voyages to the Danish West Indies, some of them with slaves from the Danish Gold Coast. Back in 1787, he had resided with his family at No. 179 in Christianshavn (now part of Overgaden oven Vandet 44–46). In 1795, he was appointed as Waterschout in Copenhagen. He had the same year acquired Overgaden Oven Vandet 12-14 but sold it again later the same year. In 1800, he also acquired No. 188 (now Overgaden Oven Vandet 20= with the intention of replacin it with a new building.

Peter Hansen Kock was still residing in his old property (No. 187) at the time of the 1801 census. He lived there with his wife Anne Olsdatter, the 18-year-old sailor Hans Tiesen, 14-year-old Mette Kirstine Andersen, a five-year-old boy from the Danish West Indies named Peter Friemann and two maids. At the time of his confirmation, Peter Friemann was called Peter Kock and referred to as Peter Hansen Kock's "adopted son". The name "Frimann" (lit. "Free Man") indicates that he could be the son of a freed slave. Alternatively, he could be Kock's own son by a slave in the Danish West Indies. Kock's new property (No. 188) was home to 16 residents in four households at the 1801 census. Hans Dyresen, an innkeeper, resided in the building with his wife Anne Marie Olsdatter. Henrich Haldsen, a turner, resided in the building with his wife Bente Andreasdatter and the wife's 21-year-old sister Christine Andersdatter. Peter Sørensen, a workman, resided in the building with his wife Anne Olsdatter, their three foster children (aged one to four) and two lodgers (ship carpenter and smith). Christian Larsen, another workman, resided in the building with his wife Else Truelsdatter and their two children (aged four and seven).

In 1802, Kock demolished the building at No. 188 and replaced it with the present building on the site. His property was listed as No. 102 in the new cadastre of 1806.

=== Niels Martinus Balling ===
In 1857, No. 191 was acquired for 7,900 rigsdaler by shoemaker Niels Martinus Balling. Ballind's home and shoemaker's workshop was located in Løvstræde, first at No. 7 (since 1753) and later at No. 10. This did not change after he had acquired the building in Christianshavn, it was purely an investment. Balling's son Wilhelm (1848-1902) would later establish Copenhagen's leading dfance institute and publish a book with omstructions in popular dances.

Balling's property was home to 23 residents in seven small households at the 1860 census. Christian Wilhelm Christiansen, a sailing master, resided on the ground floor with his wife Agnes Christiansen, their two sons (aged five and ten) and one lodger (mechanician). Otto Ferdinand Elling, a smith, resided on the first floor with his wife Ane Marie Elling and their 12-year-old son Mortimer Elling. Ane Haaland, a former midwife, resided on the second floor with her 24-year-old daughter Baldine Stender and two lodgers (both klein smiths).Carl Mou, a sailor, resided on the same floor with his wife Magaretha Frederike Catharine Mou and their one-year-old son Carl Mou. Laurine Svanberg. a laundry woman and seemstress, resided on the ground floor of the rear wing with one lodger (miller). Christen Jensen, a workman, resided on the first floor of the rear wing with his wife Christiane Mesner Jensen and their five-year-old daughter Ane Maghrethe Jensen. Peter Christian Andersen, another workman, resided on the same floor with his wife Marie Andersen and their one-year-old daughter Johanne Marie Andersen.

=== 1880 census ===
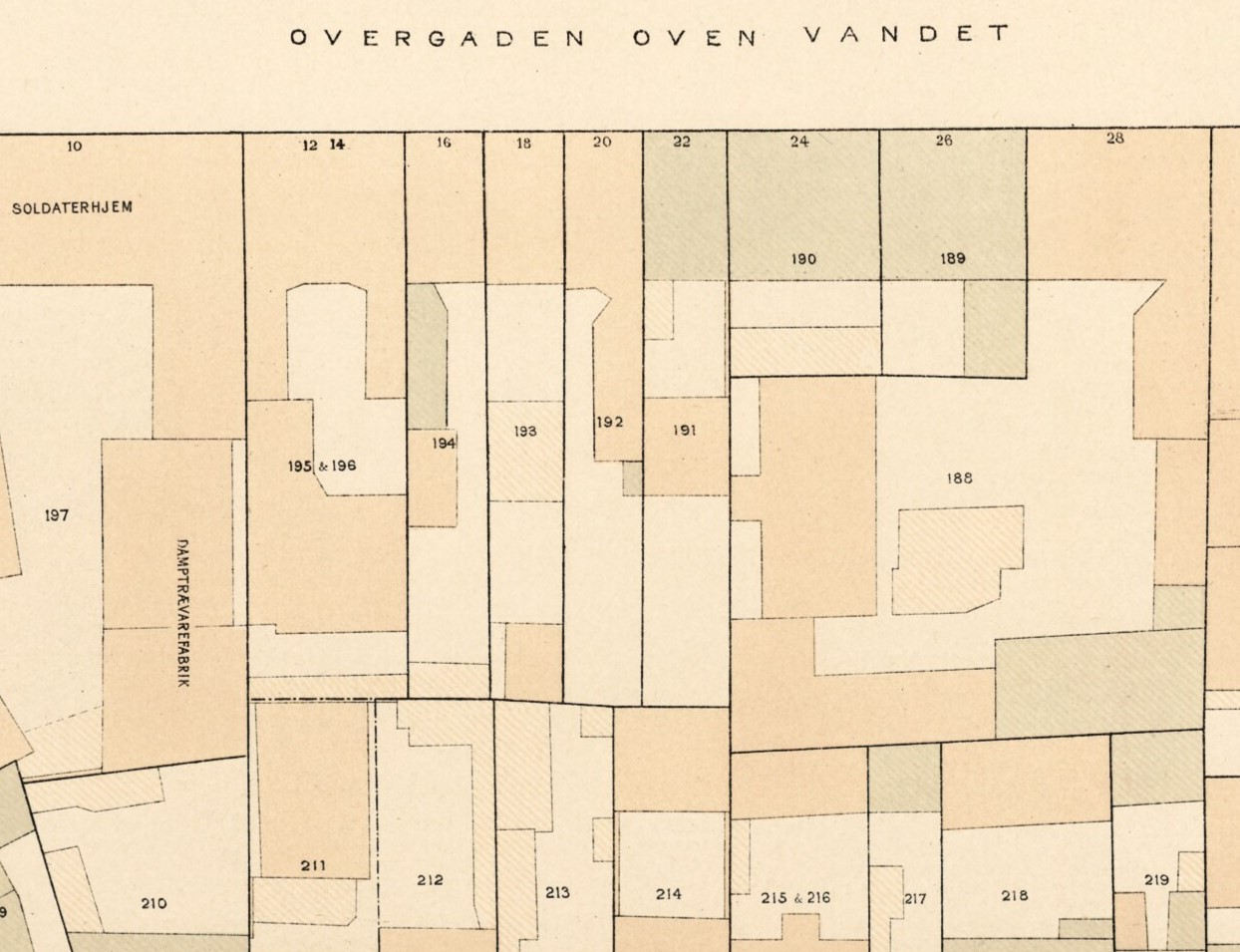
Overgaden Oven Vandet 22 seen on a detail from one of Berggreen's block plans of Christianshavn, 1886-88.

Carl Ågren, a smith, resided on the ground floor with his wife Frederikke Vilhelmine Ågren.Niels Hallager, a master saddler, resided on the first floor with his wife Caroline Frederikke Hallager. a sergeant and equestrian trainer in the Artillery, resided on the second floor with his wife Ragnhild Oløff Gudrun Jelstrup and their two children (aged one and four=. Sofie Margrethe Sørensen, a married woman (no mention of her husband), resided on the ground floor of the rear wing with her infant daughter Anna Nielsine Sørensen. Niels Laursen, a workman, resided on the first floor of the rear wing with his wife Louise Cathrine Laursen, their 13-year-old daughter Niels Lauritz Damianus Laursen and two visitors.

=== 2+th century ===
Anders Petersen operated a restaurant and meeting rooms for local associations in the building. The building was listed in the Danish registry of protected buildings and places in 1945.

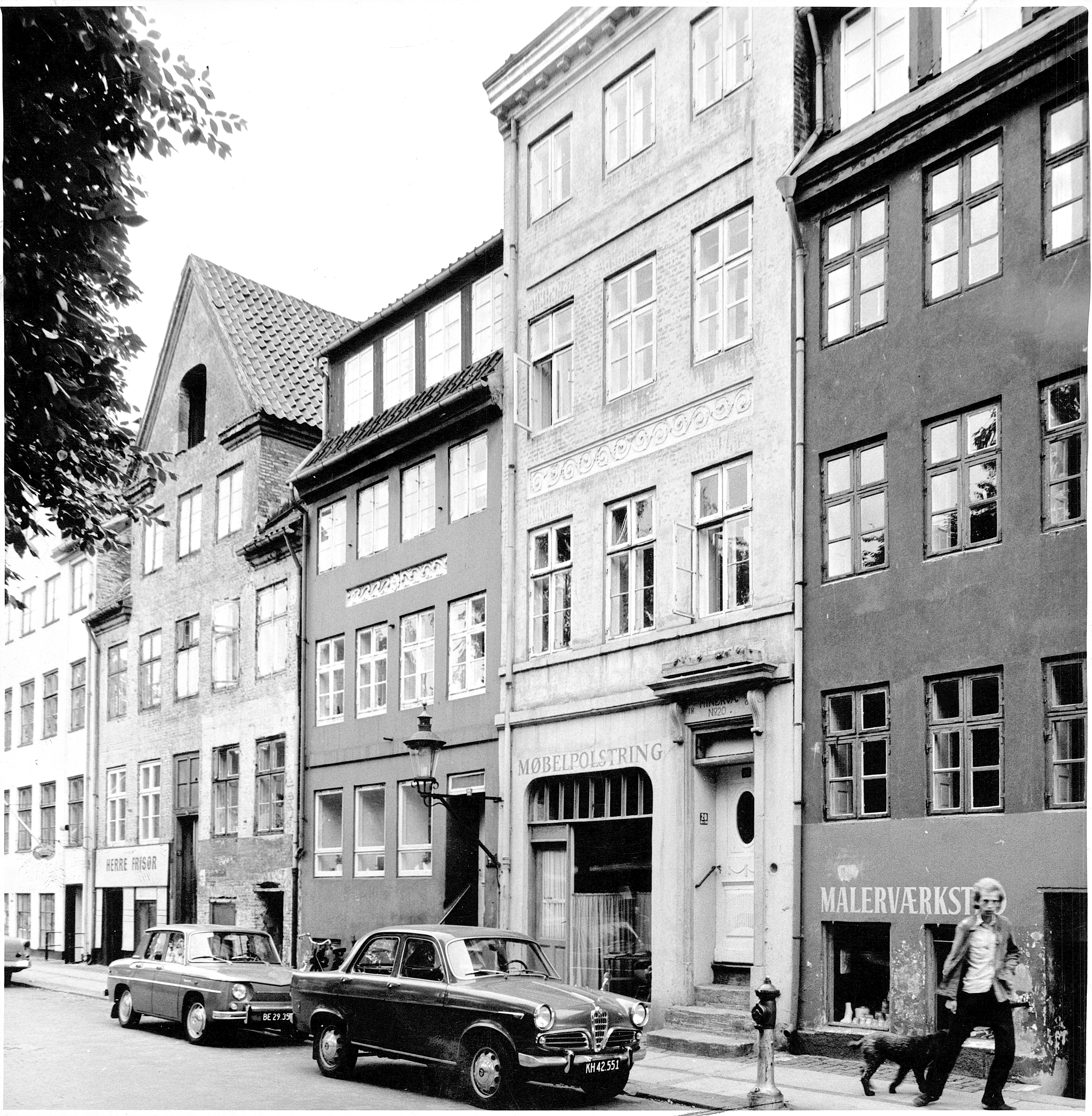
The building in 1965.

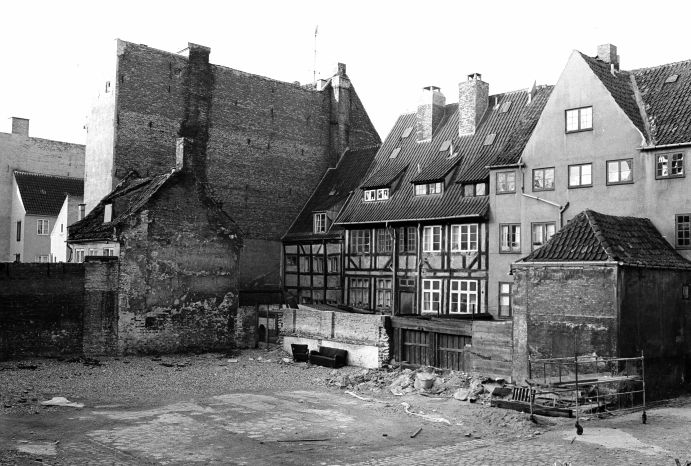
The building viewed from the courtyard.

== Architecture ==
Overgaden Oven Vandet 22 was originally constructed with timber framing with two storeys walk-out basement towards the street. In 1897, ot was heightened with one storey towards the street. The front side of the building was reconstructed in brick in 1800. The four bays wide plastered and bloepainted facade is finished with a cornice band above the ground floor and a white-painted cornice. It features a recessed frieze with stucco ornamentation between the two central windows of the first and second floors. The facade towards the courtyard has black-painted timber framing and white-painted infills. The pitched roof features a four-bay "factory dormer# towards the street.

== Today ==
As of 2008, Overgaden Oven Vandet 20 belonged to Peter Edgar Abrahamson.
