= Kristian Hude =

Danish photographer

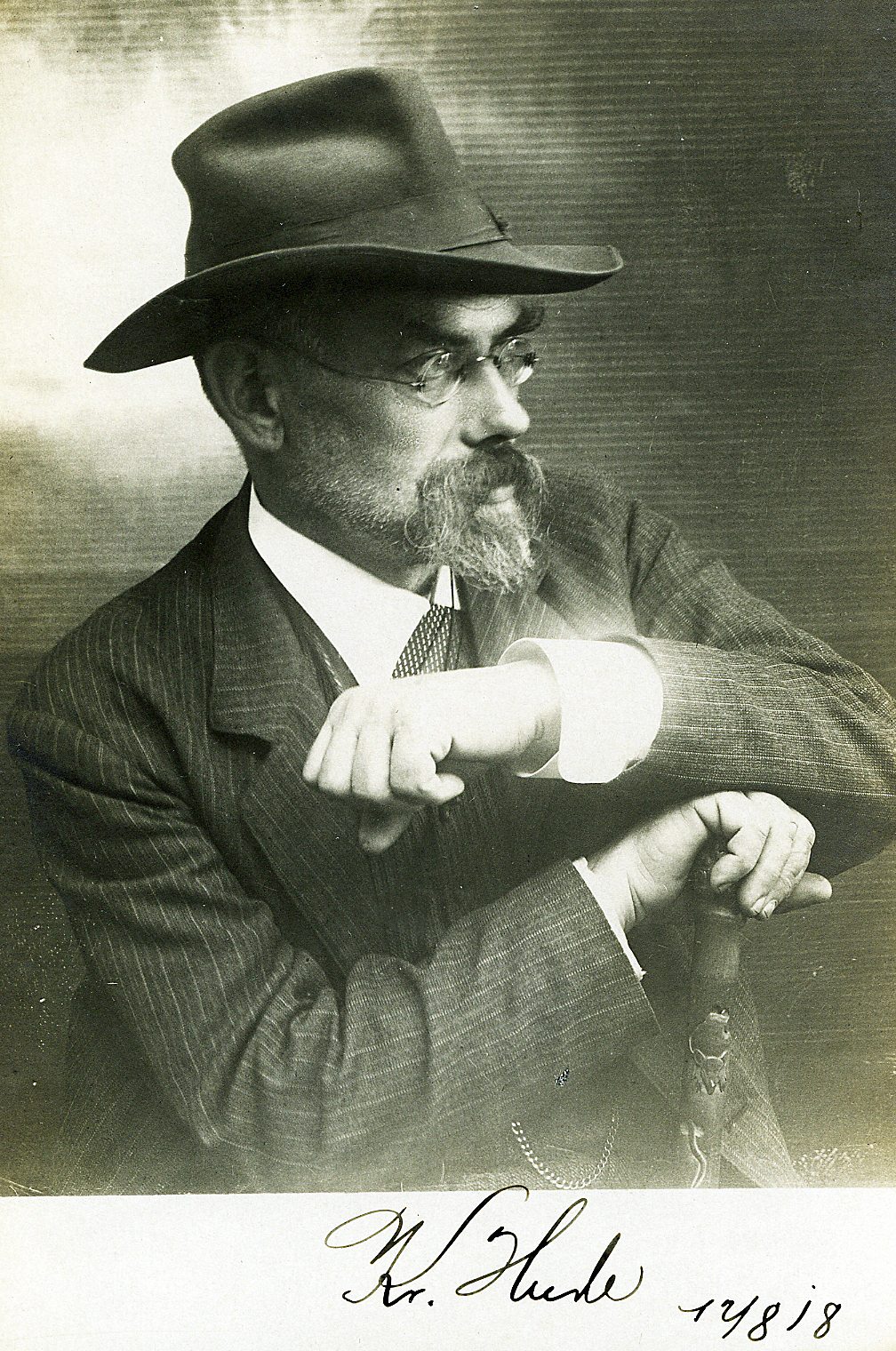
- Photographic self-portrait by Peter Elfelt
- Born: 16 August 1864; Roskilde, Denmark
- Died: 28 December 1929 (aged 65); Roskilde, Denmark
- Occupations: Photographer film director
- Years active: 1894–1907

Kristian Hude (16 August 1864 – 28 December 1929) was a Danish photographer. He specialized in architecture photography.

== Biography ==
Hude was born as Christian (Kristian) Ludvig (von der) Hude in Roskilde, the son of lawyer Sophus Waldemar (von der) Hude (1830–99) and Johanne Laurentine Elisabeth Tulinius (1833–99). He was the brother of Anna Hude and Karl Hude.

Hude graduated from Roskilde Cathedral School in 1881. He then studied Nordic filology at the University of Copenhagen but dropped out after a few years and became a private teacher, first on Bornholm and then in 1894–96 at Brødebækgård under Gisselfeld and in 1896–97 in Lorup near Sorø. On his hikes in the countryside, he started photographing the local churches. This inspired him to become a photographer of architecture and artworks. He subsequently apprenticed in photography with Peter Elfelt from c. 1890 to 1892 in Copenhagen.

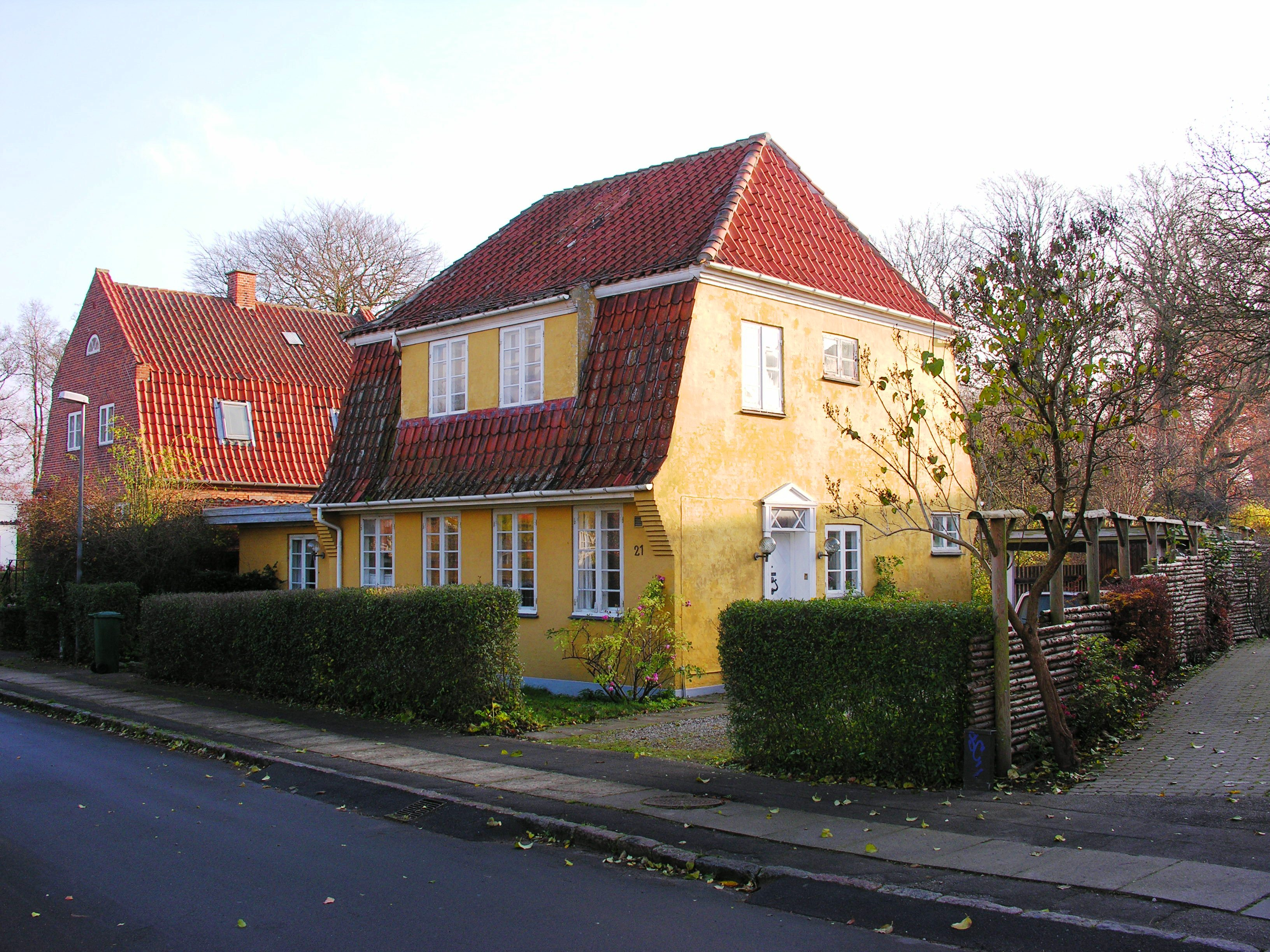
Hude's house at Klostervang 21 in Roskilde.

In 1899, Hude established his own photographic studio in Roskilde. He worked as a photographer both for the National Museum of Denmark and the Association for the Preservation of Historic Buildings. He was first based at Hersegade 10, then at Skomagergade 19, and from 1906 at Algade 26. He later moved to his own house at Klostervang 21. On Saturdays, he generally made a trip to Copenhagen. He also went on frequent trips around the country to photograph historic buildings. In 1919, Hude was awarded an annual sum of DKK 900 from the Danish state in return for leaving his glass negatives to the National Museum of Denmark.

In 1901, he formed a friendship with the author Gustav Wied. After Wied's suicide, he formed a friendship with L.A. Ring. When he was in his 40s, Hude was hit by a neural disease which made it still more difficult for him to walk. On 28 December 1929, he committed suicide.

== Legacy ==
Hude left some 6,000 glass negatives to the National Museum of Denmark. Roskilde Museum holds some 1,000 of his photographs of Roskilde.

Hude's photographs were used in H. Weitemeyer's third edition of Traps Danmark, Troels-Lund's Dagligt Liv i Norden, Edwin Redslob's Alt Danemar (Munic, 1914; later published in Danish by Francis Beckett and Chr. Axel Jensen as Gammel dansk Kunst) as well as in numerous school books.

== Gallery ==
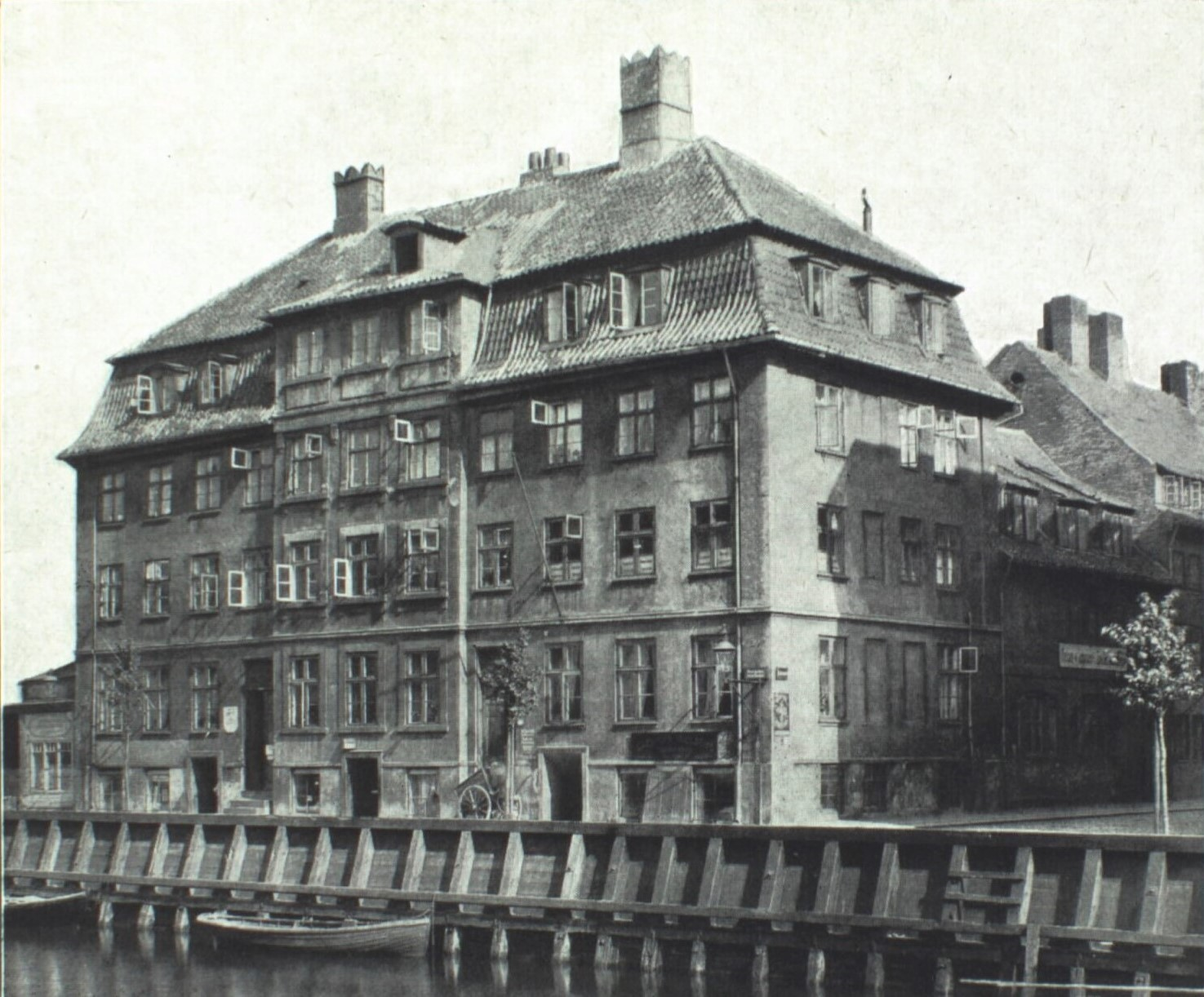
Steinfass House in Christianshavn

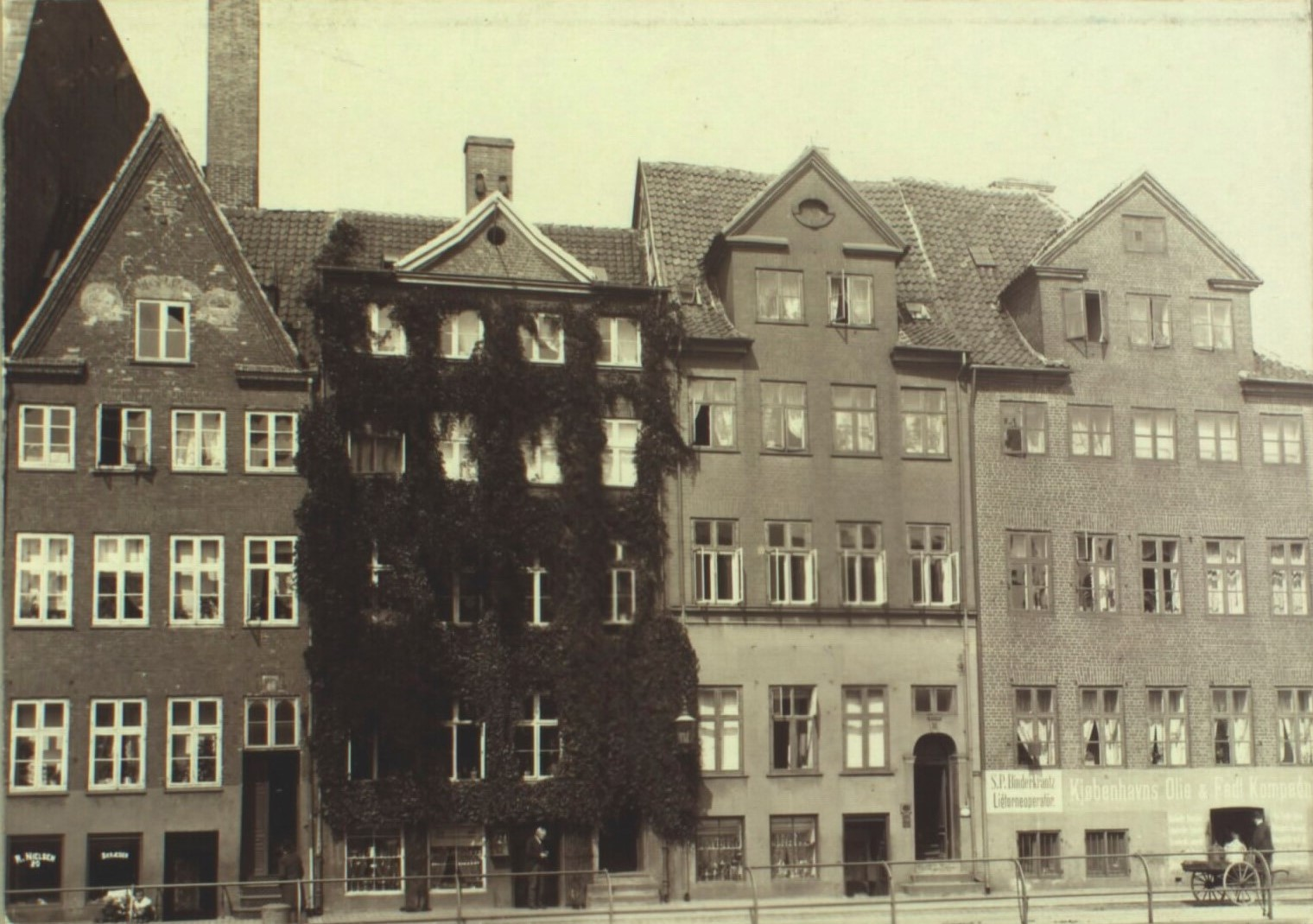
Nybrogade 14, Nybrogade 16. Mybrogade 18 and Nybrogade 20 in Copenhagen

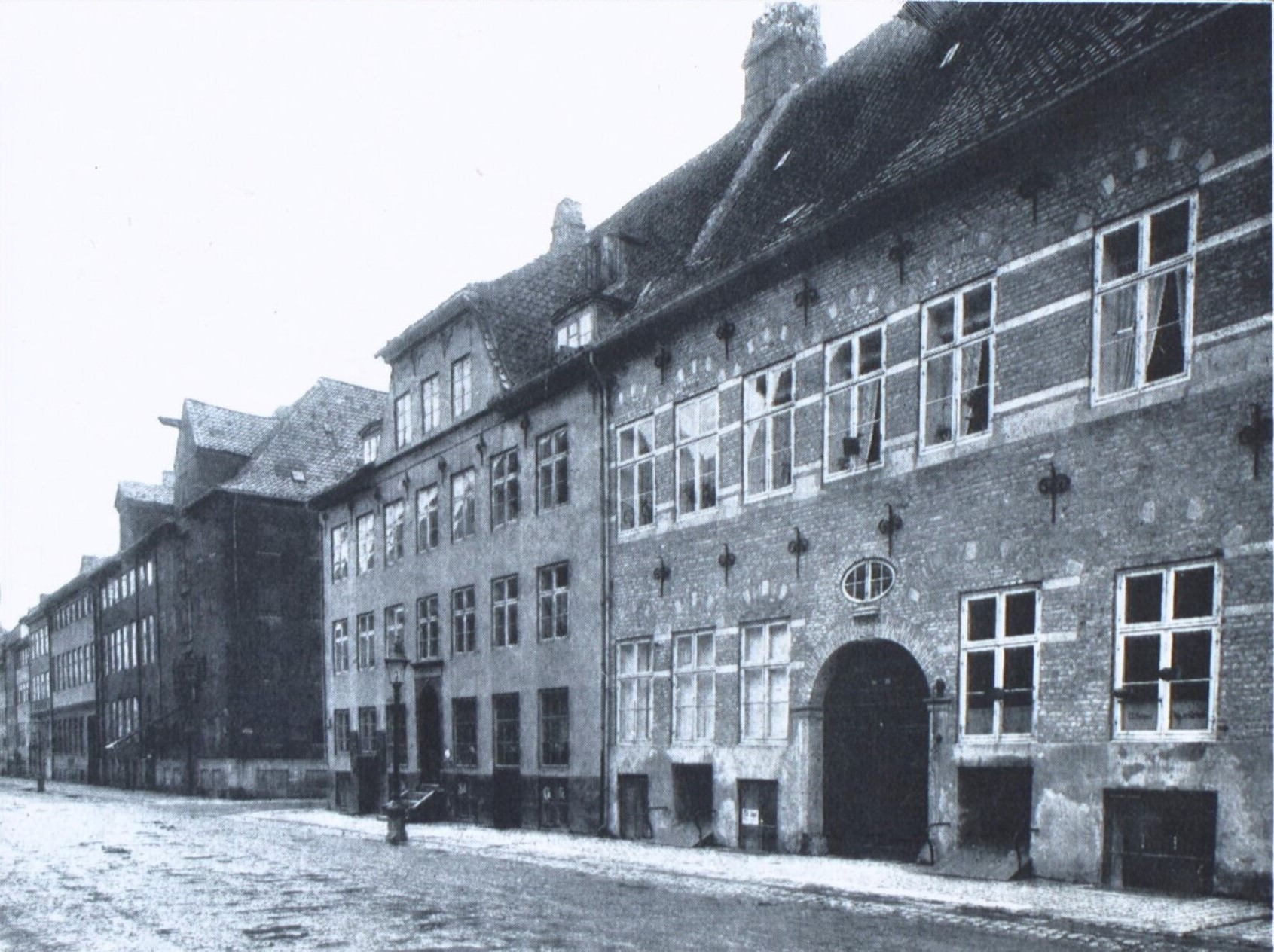
Strandgade 30 and the Mikkel Vibe House in Christianshavn
