= Nikolaj Plads 27 =

Danish historical building

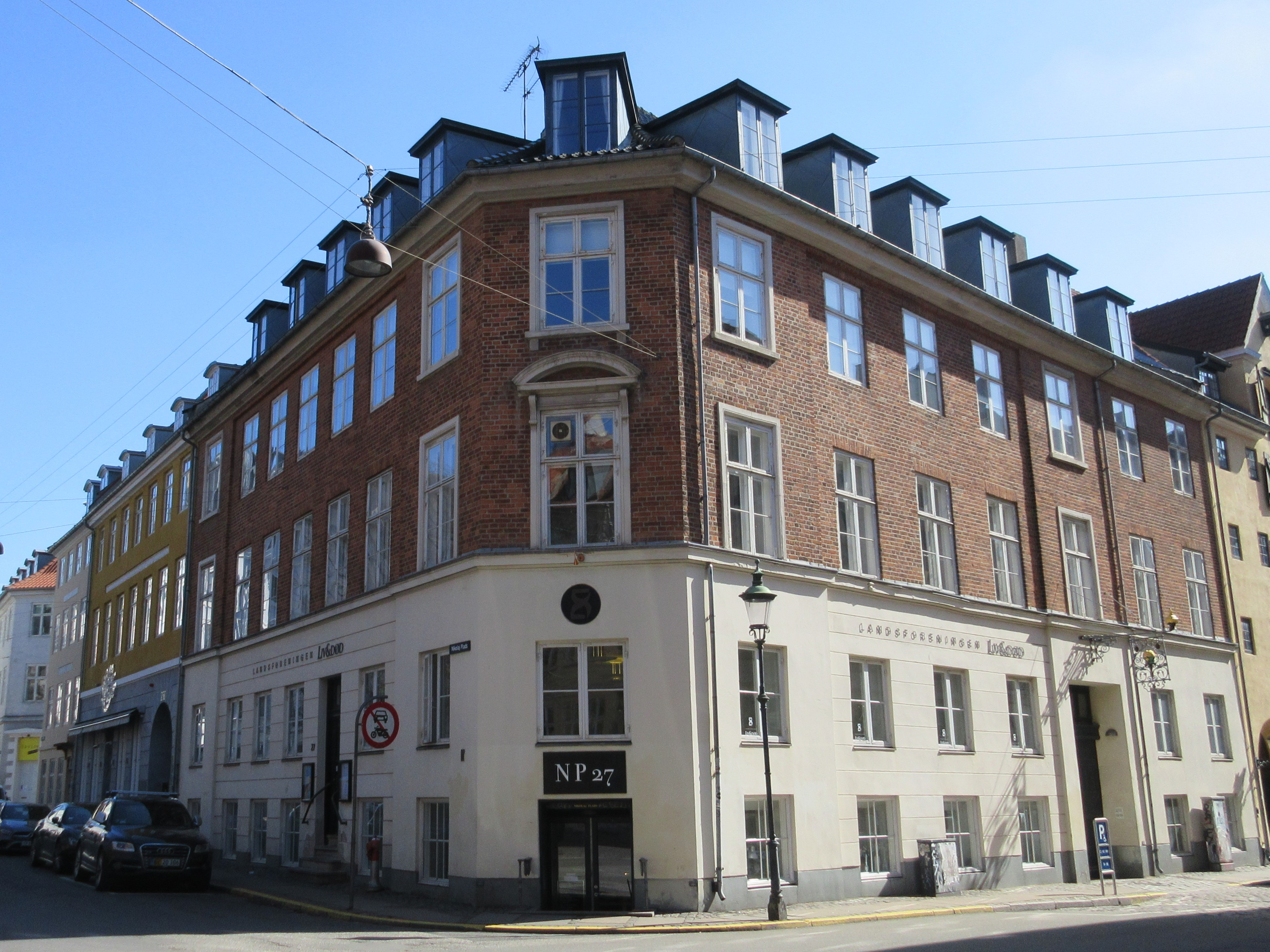
- Interactive map of the Nikolaj Plads 27 area

General information
- Architectural style: Neoclassical
- Location: Copenhagen, Denmark
- Coordinates: 55°40′41.38″N 12°34′54.37″E
- Completed: 1797 / 1800 (extension)

Nikolaj Plads 27 is a Neoclassical property situated at the corner of Nikolaj Plads and Admiralgade in central Copenhagen, Denmark. It was like most of the other buildings in the area constructed as part of the rebuilding of the city following the Copenhagen Fire of 1795. It was listed in the Danish registry of protected buildings and places in 1945.

== History ==
=== Before the Great Fire of 1795 ===
The site was formerly made up of four individual properties which were all owned by St. Nicolas' Church. The four properties were listed in Copenhagen's first cadastre of 1689 as No. 92, No. 93, No. 94 and No. 184 in East Quarter. No. 93 belonged to organist Johan Lorentz and No. 94 was occupied by bell-ringer Ole Munk.

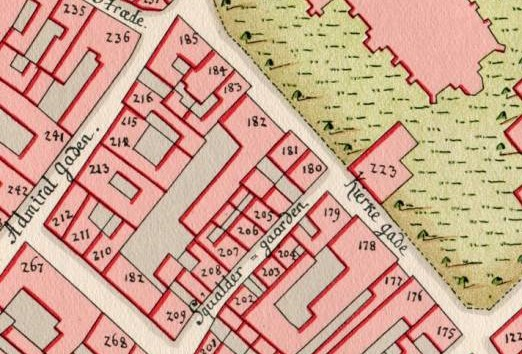
No. 185 etc. seen in a detail from Christian Gedde's map of the East Quarter, 1757

The bell-ringer's house and the organist's house were listed in the new cadastre of 1756 as No. 183 (old No. 94) and No. 184 (old No. 93) occupied by bell-ringer Henrik Schurmand and organist Frederik Christian Bredendich. The two other properties were by then occupied by Ole Peder Heidemark (No. 185, old No. 92) and Peder Fogt (No. 216, old No. 184).

The widow Susanna Chatarina Haubers was at the time of the 1787 census operating a tavern at No. 183. She was living there with her mother and a daughter, a grandson from her late husband's first marriage and two maids. The bell-ringer Ole Graae was a lodger. No. 184 was occupied by organist Ditlev Bachsted and a maid. No. 185 was occupied by assistant priest at St. Nicolas' Church Jørgen Hatting Rørbye, his wife Magdalena Rørbye fød Wedseltoft, their son Simon Jørgen Rørbye and four servants.

=== Gunni and Dorothea Busck ===
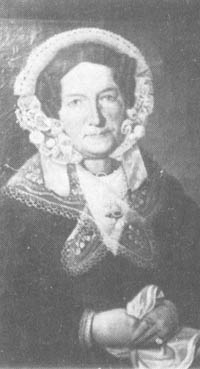
Dorothea Busck

The buildings were all destroyed in the Copenhagen Fire of 1795, together with the church and most of the other buildings in the area. The fire sites were subsequently merged into a single property (No. 183). On 23 September 1795 it was sold to bookkeeper Gunii Busch (1765–1821) for 1,594 Danish rigsdaler. The current building on the site was constructed for him in 1796–97. Busck, who had until then worked for Det Schimmelmannske Fideicommis, had just been hired as bookkeeper at the speciesbank with an annual salary of 800 rigsdaler. Busck was on 21 December 1796 in the Church of the Holy Ghost wed to Dorothea Ludwigsen (1779–1855), daughter of merchant and ship-owner Just Ludwigsen (1742–1818) and Birgitte Tranberg (1761–1813). The property was in 1799–1800 expanded with a perpendicular extension in Admiralgade. The extension contained stabling for seven horses and a remise in the ground floor.

Gunni and Dorothea Busck were at the time of the 1801 census residing in the building with their son Gunni Busck, their daughter Emilie Busk and three servants. Minister of Holmens Church Jens Block resided in another apartment with his wife Christine Meinke, their daughter Lovise and three maids. A third household consisted of artillery surgeon Andreas Fenger, his wife Hanne Haase, their adopted son Hans Tideman, three servants, organist Johan Kietz, Kietz's mother and two sisters, and the assistant Svend Røer. The fourth household consisted of Røer's sister Magdaslene Nielsen and a maid.

Gunni and Dorothea Busck later had two more sons, August (1806–1869) and Julius (1811–1877), while their daughter Emilie died as an infant. The property at the corner of Nikolaj Plads and Admiralgade was in the new cadastre of 1806 listed as No. 147. Gunni Busck died from "chest cramps" on 11 May 1821. Dorothea Busck was granted royal permission to retain undivided possession of the estate. The eldest son Gunni Busck became a clergyman who belonged to the circle around N. F. S. Grundtvig. August Busck owned Benzonseje (now Risbyholm) at Roskilde from 1834 to 1857 and was the father of businessman Gunni Busck. Julius Busck purchased Sæbygård at Kalundborg in 1837.

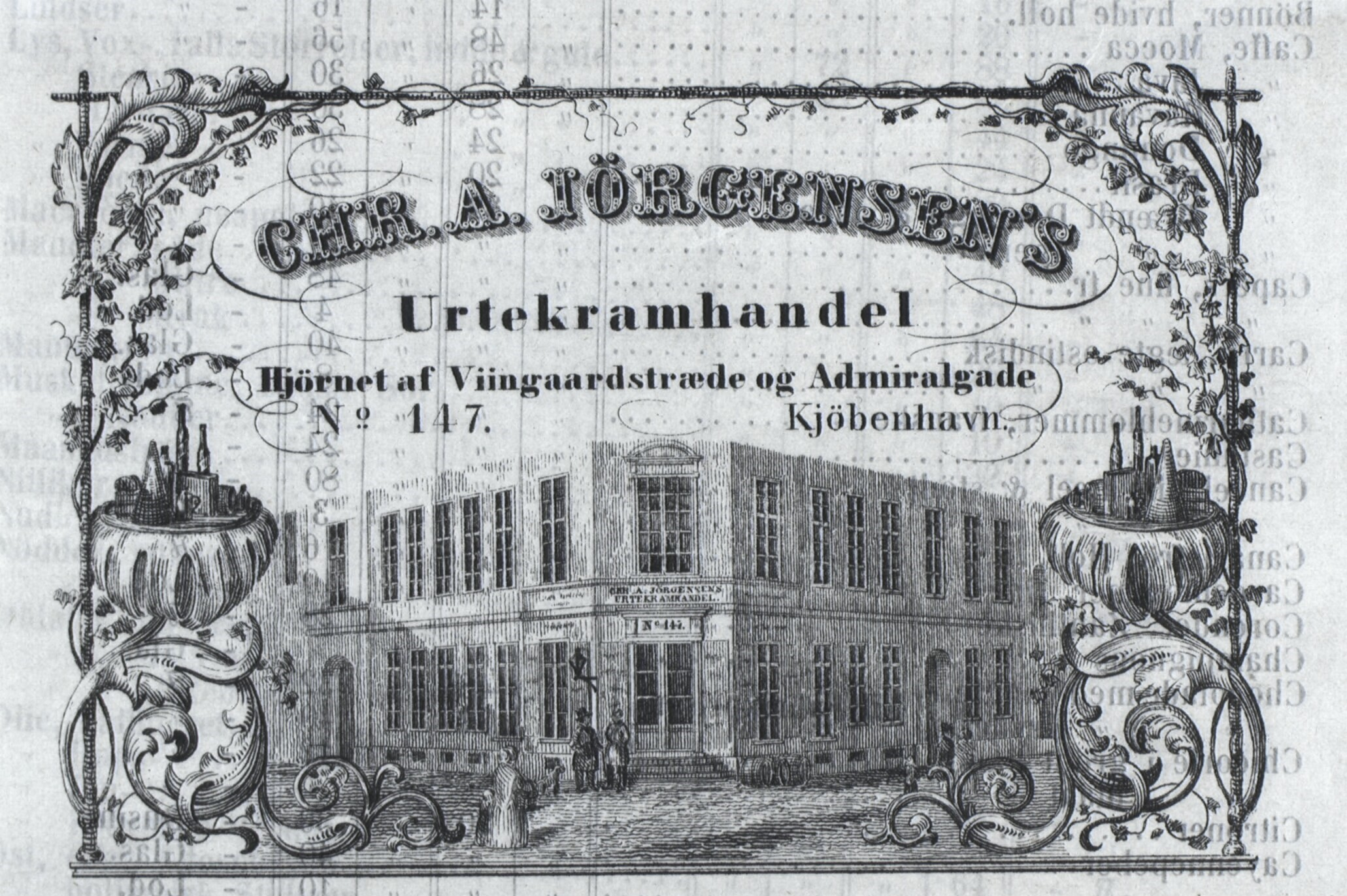
Chr. A. Jørgensen, 1846

The building was at the time of the 1840 census home to a total of 20 people. Dorothea Busck resided with a maid on the second floor. Jens Jensen, "kongelig medfoged", was residing with his wife, their three children and a maid in the other apartment on the second floor. The unmarried sisters Sophie and Louise Schjørring resided on the ground floor with the lodger Louise Billeskou and a maid. The Schjørring sisters were together managing the Institute for Women's Handcraft (Institut for Qvinders Haandarbejde). Elisabeth Payh, an unmarried woman employed with needlework, was also residing on the ground floor ("Towards Admiralgade"). Minister of Holmens Church Andreas Krog Holm (1767–1851) resided with his daughter Cathrine Sophie Holm and a maid on the first floor. Anne Christine Schneider, a woman employed with needlework, resided with her daughter in another apartment on the first floor ("Towards the Yard"). Charlotte Bechmann, a 34-year-old widow, resided with her son Peter Christian Bechmann on the first floor.

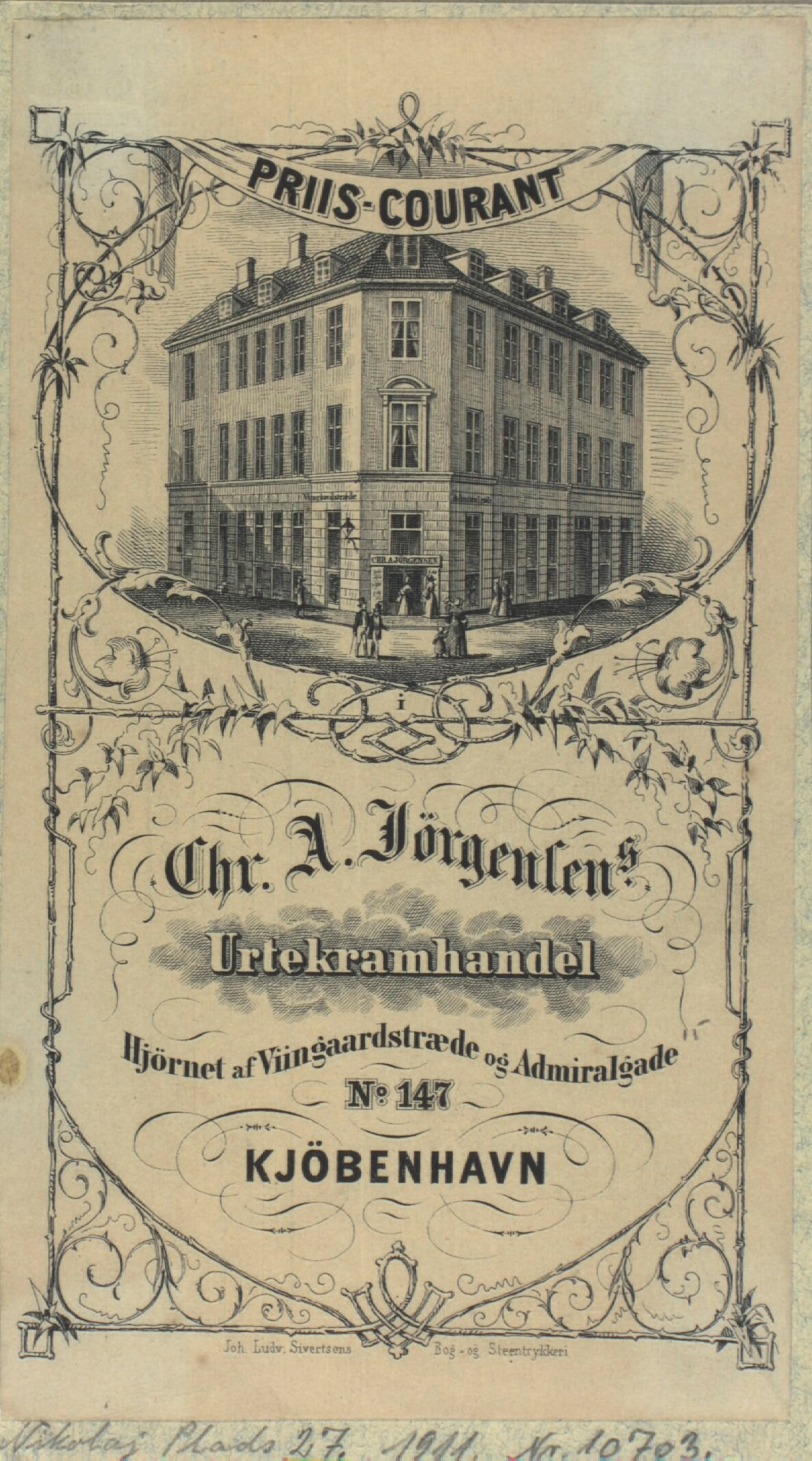
Advert for Chr. A. Jørgensen's grocery business

The 71-year-old Dorothea Busck was at the time of the 1850 census still residing in one of the apartments on the second floor. Her grandson Andreas Busck, a son of Gunni Busck, was living there with her. Two of her other grandsons, Georg and Theodor Busck, both law students, were among the residents on the ground floor. The grocer Christian Anthon Jørgensen was together with a couple of employees residing in the other ground floor apartment. He was at the same time operating Cjr. A. Jørgensens Urtekramforretning, a grocery business, in the basement. The now retired pastor Andreas Krog Holm was still residing with his unmarried son and daughter on the first floor. Johannes Emanuel Krieger, a jurist working for the Ministry of Finance, resided with his sister in the other apartment on the first floor. Johan Frederich Holm, who worked in the artillery, resided on the second floor with his wife, five children and mother-in-law.

Dorothea Busck died in 1855. She was buried next to her husband in Assistens Cemetery.

=== Later history ===
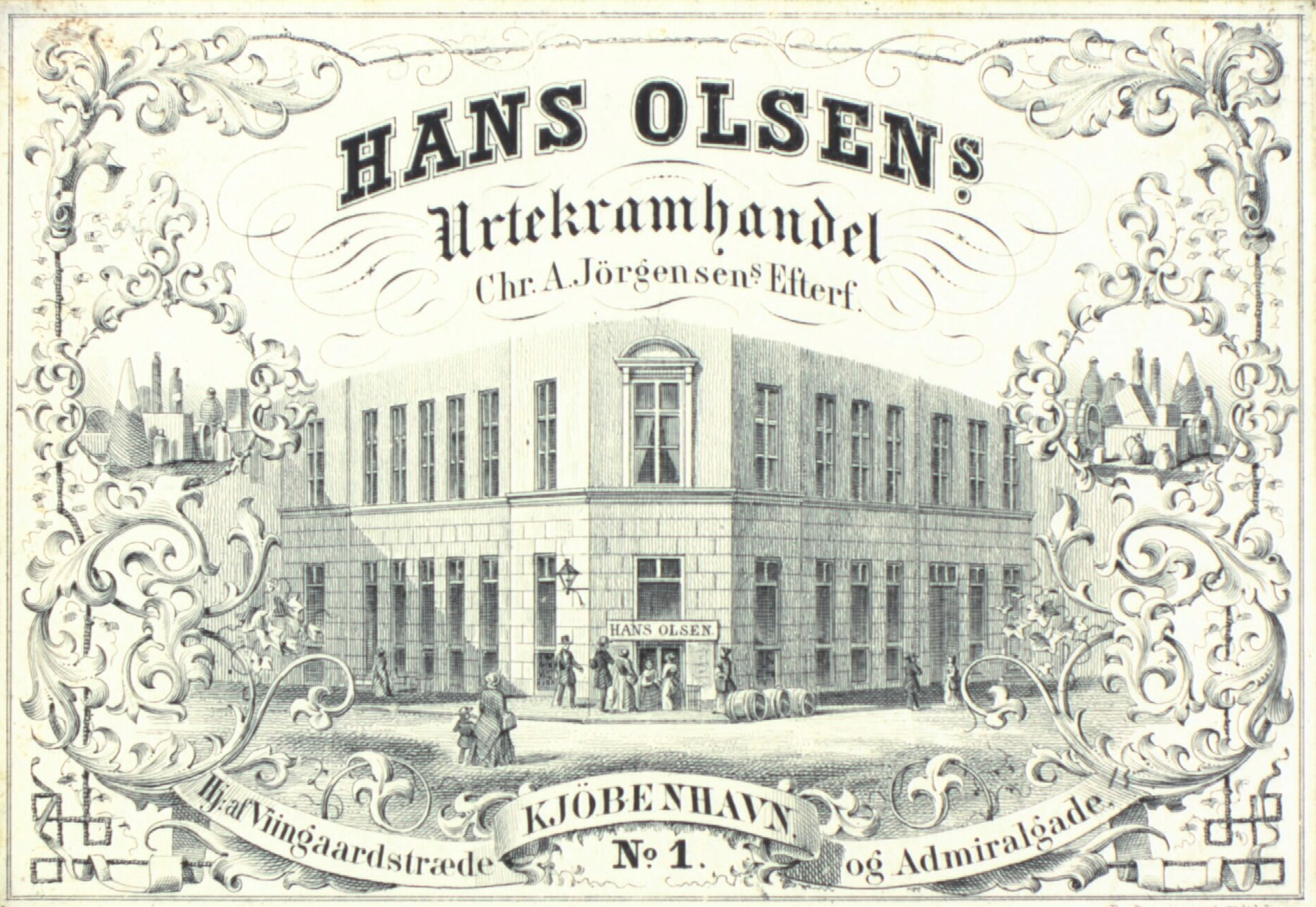
Advert for Hans Olsen's grocery store

Christian A. Jørgensen's grocery business in the basement was at some point taken over by Hans Olsen and continued under his own name. The building was in 1867 (one year after Dorothea Busck's death) subject to a major renovation. The basement of the extension in Admiralgade was converted into another grocery shop (this time a hørkræmmer). The ground floor was at the same time converted into a café with associated dwelling for the restaurateur.

With the introduction of house numbering by street in 1859 (as opposed to the old cadastral numbers by quarter), No. 147 became Vingårdstræde 1 and Admiralgade 15. The minister Bruun Juul Fog (1819–1896) resided in one of the apartments at Admiralgade 15 from 1862 to 1869.

The café was in 1886 converted into a wineshop. In 1818, it was converted into a broker's office. The building was in 1921 acquired by Dansk Ligbrændingsforening. The association had been founded in 1881.

Liv & Død (formerly Dansk Ligbrændingsforening) was based in the building until at least 2009.

== Architecture ==
The building is constructed in red brick with three storeys over a walk-out basement. The façades towards Ninolak Plads and Admiralgade are both seven bays long. The chamfered corner bay was dictated for all corner buildings by Jørgen Henrich Rawert's and Peter Meyn's guidelines for the rebuilding of the city after the fire so that the fire department's long ladder companies could navigate the streets more easily. A perpendicular side wing from 1800 extends from the rear side of the Admiralgade wing. The outer bay on Nikolak Plads and the three east bays towards Admiralgade are slightly projecting compared to the rest of the facades. The ground floor is plastered and finished with shadow joints except on the projecting outer bays and the corner chamfer. The upper part of the facade in undressed red brick is finished by a white-painted cornice. The windows on the two upper floors of the projecting bay towards Nikolakplads and the fifth bay in Admiralgade as well as on the corner chamfer are accented with sills and extra framing. The first floor corner window is in addition tipped by a segmental pediment. The main entrance in the centre of the facade towards Nikolaj Plads is raised three stone steps from the street level. The door is topped by a transom window. A gateway is located in the fifth bay towards Admiralgade. It opens to a small courtyard. The rear side of the building is plastered and painted in a pale yellow colour. The roof is clad in black tile towards the street and red tile towards the yard. It features four dormer windows towards Nikolaj Plads and five towards Admiralgade. The roof ridge towards Nikolaj Plads is pierced by three chimneys. The perpendicular wing from 1800 has a monopitched roof with one chimney.

== Today ==
The building has a total floor area of 14,400 square metres. It contains three commercial leases, four residential leases and a fully utilized basement. In August 2023, it was sold for DKK 55 mio. to a private buyer.
