= Nybrogade 20 =

Building in Copenhagen, Denmark

Nybrogae 20
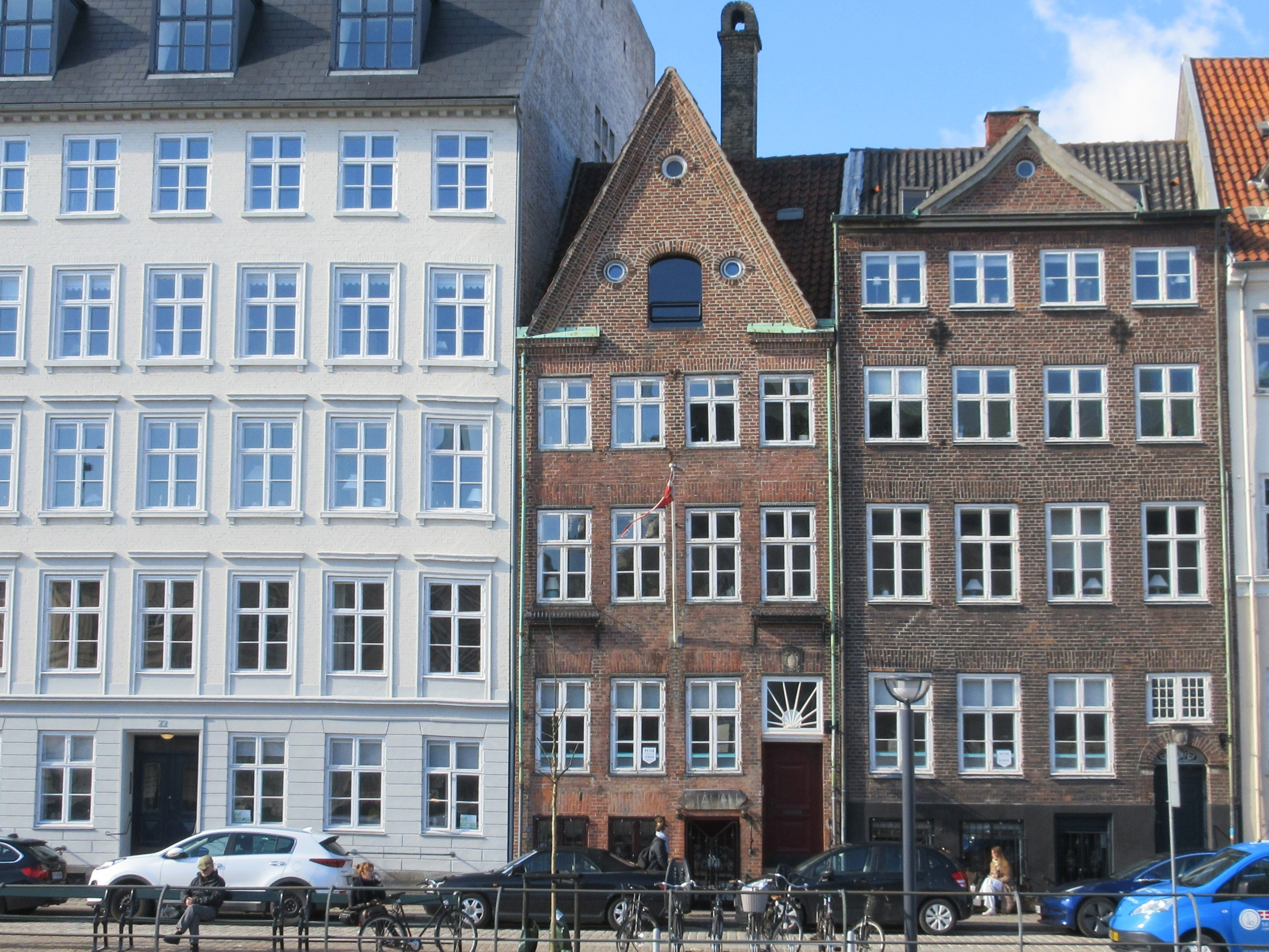
- Interactive map of the Nybrogae 20 area

General information
- Architectural style: Neoclassical
- Location: Copenhagen, Denmark
- Coordinates: 55°40′34.86″N 12°34′33.89″E
- Completed: 1731

Nybrogade 20 is an 18th century canal house overlooking Slotsholmens Kanal and Slotsholmen in central Copenhagen, Denmark. It was listed in the Danish registry of protected buildings and places in 1945.

== History ==
=== 17th century ===
The property was listed in Copenhagen's first cadastre of 1689 as No. 21, owned by skipper Hans Larsen's heirs. The present building on the site was constructed in 1731 for bargeman Ole Hansen. The property was listed in the new cadastre of 1756 as No. 18 in Snaren's Quarter and was still owned by him at that time.

=== Simon Hechkier ===
The property was home to 25 residents in four households at the 1787 census. Simon Hechkier, an official (mægler) at the Customs House, resided in the building with his wife Johanne Levin Moses Marboe, their six children (aged six to 20). Maren Eppesen, a widow, resided in the building with her daughter Anne Sofie Fransen (dancer) and one maid. Per Madsen Vollerup, a shoemaker and former fireman, resided in the building with his wife Else Marie Mads Datter and their three children (aged five and five to 11). Andres Pedersen Bierring, a royal lackey, resided in the building with his wife Giertru Sølvermand, their four children (aged two to nine), a poor nine-year-old boy that they had adopted, one maid and one lodger.

Simon Marcus Hechschier's property was home to four households at the 1801 census. The owner resided in the building with his wife Gunilde Hechschier, their 19-year-old daughter Lise Hechschier and one maid. Andreas Engberg, a ship captain, resided in the building with his wife Ane Cathrine Alling. their 19-year-old son Jacob Engberg, one maid and one lodger. Ole Lauritzen, a clerk, resided in the building with his wife Birgitte Marie Eller, two-year-old daughter Eva Cathrine Lauritzen and one maid. Johan Carl Folmer and Helene Marie Schulz resided in the building with one maid and one lodger.

The building was again listed as No. 18 in the new cadastre of 1806 and belonged to merchant Simon Hechscher at that time.

=== 1840 census ===
The property was home to a total of 12 residents at the 1840 census. Susanne Meyn, widow of royal building inspector C. Meyn, resided with three daughters on the ground floor. Major General Carl Erich Sames's orphaned children Carl Wilhelm Johan von Sames and Caroline Jacobine Johanne von Sames resided on the first floor with their governess Hanne Dorothea Melbye. Sophie Frederikke Thomsen, widow of lieutenant C. F. Thomsen. resided on the second floor. Adolph Theodor Holm, a clock maker's apprentice, resided on the same floor. Else Larsen, who was operating a tea and coffee house, occupied the basement with her daughter and a maid.

=== 1850 census ===
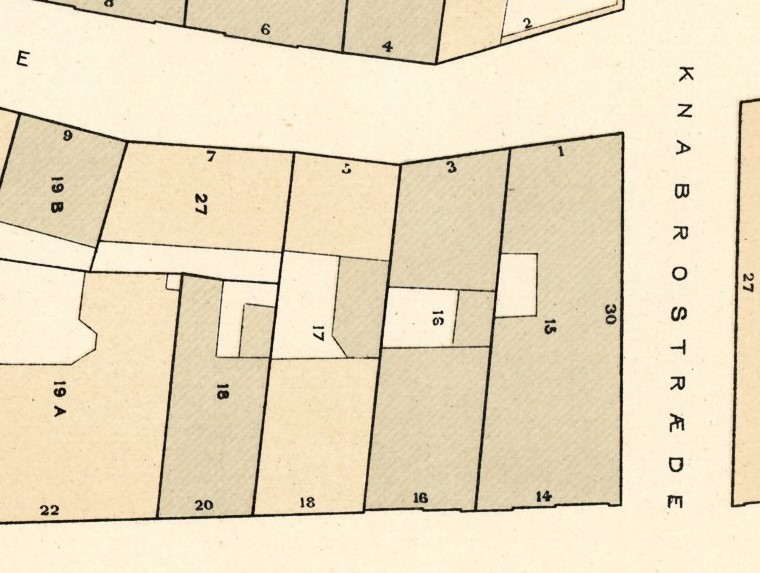
Nybrogade 20 seen on a detail from Berggreen's cadastral map of Snaren's Quarter, 1884.

The number of residents was down to eight at the 1850 census. Peter Christian Christiansen, a bookkeeper, was living with his wife on the ground floor. Jens Hansen , a worker, resided with his wife and daughter in the basement. Arcguvust at archivist Alexander Becker resided alone on the first floor. Jens Petersen, a former farmer, resided alone on the second floor.

=== 1860 census ===
The property was home to seven residents in three households at the 1880 census. Søren Christensen, a man with means, resided on the first floor with his niece Hansine Birgitte Christensen. Martin Frederik Andersen, a master joiner, resided on the ground floor with his wife Marie Christine Christiane Andersen. Ane Christine Andersenm an assistant, resided in the basement with his sons Christian Oskar Andersen and Emil Vilhelm Andersen (plumber).

== Architecture ==
Nybrogade 20 is in three storeys over a raised cellar. The front side of the building is constructed in red brick and stands on a plinth of granite ashlars. It is five bays wide and topped by a red tile roof with a gabled wall dormer in the full width of the building. The main entrance is accessed via a short flight of granite steps. The red-painted door is topped by a fanlight and above it is a cartouche with the house number 20 is seen above the door..

The rear side of the building is constructed with timber framing. A stairwell and a side wing extend from the rear side of the building, leaving only one and a half bays of it visible from the yard. These structures are also constructed with timber framing.

== Today ==
The building is owned by Marianne Kongsbak Andersen and let out as commercial spaces.

== Gallery ==
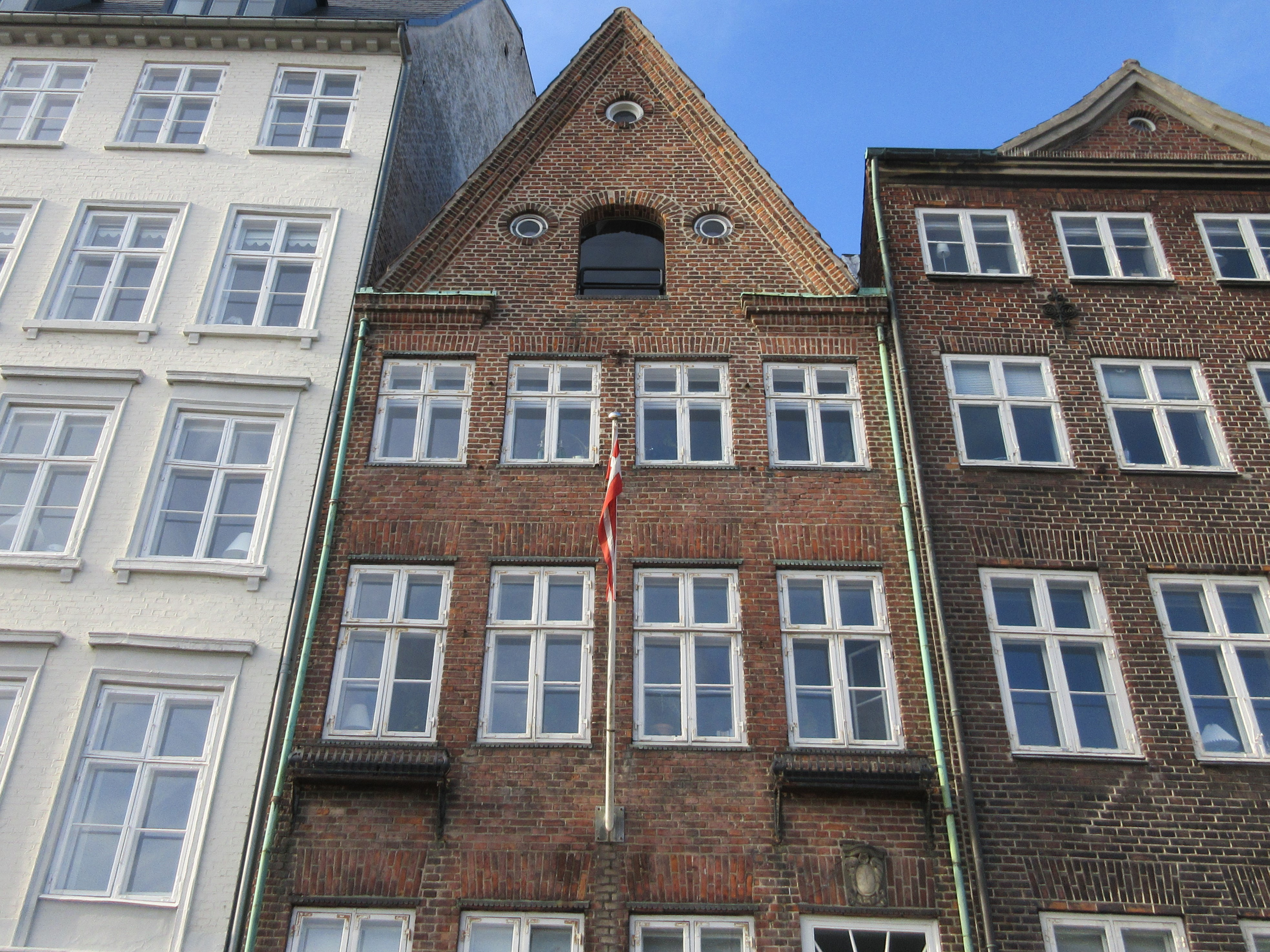
Close-up of the facade

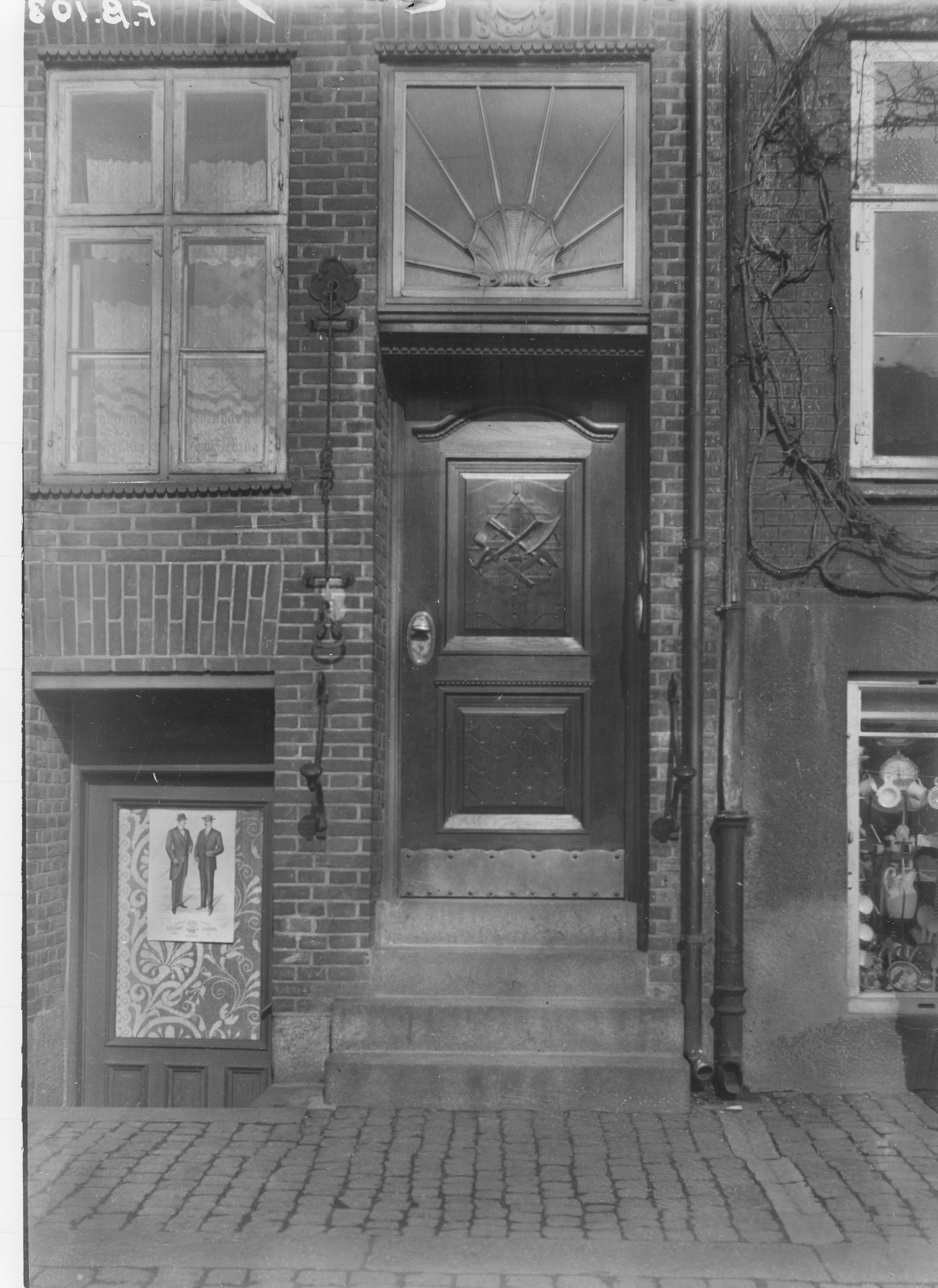
Door of Nybrogade 20

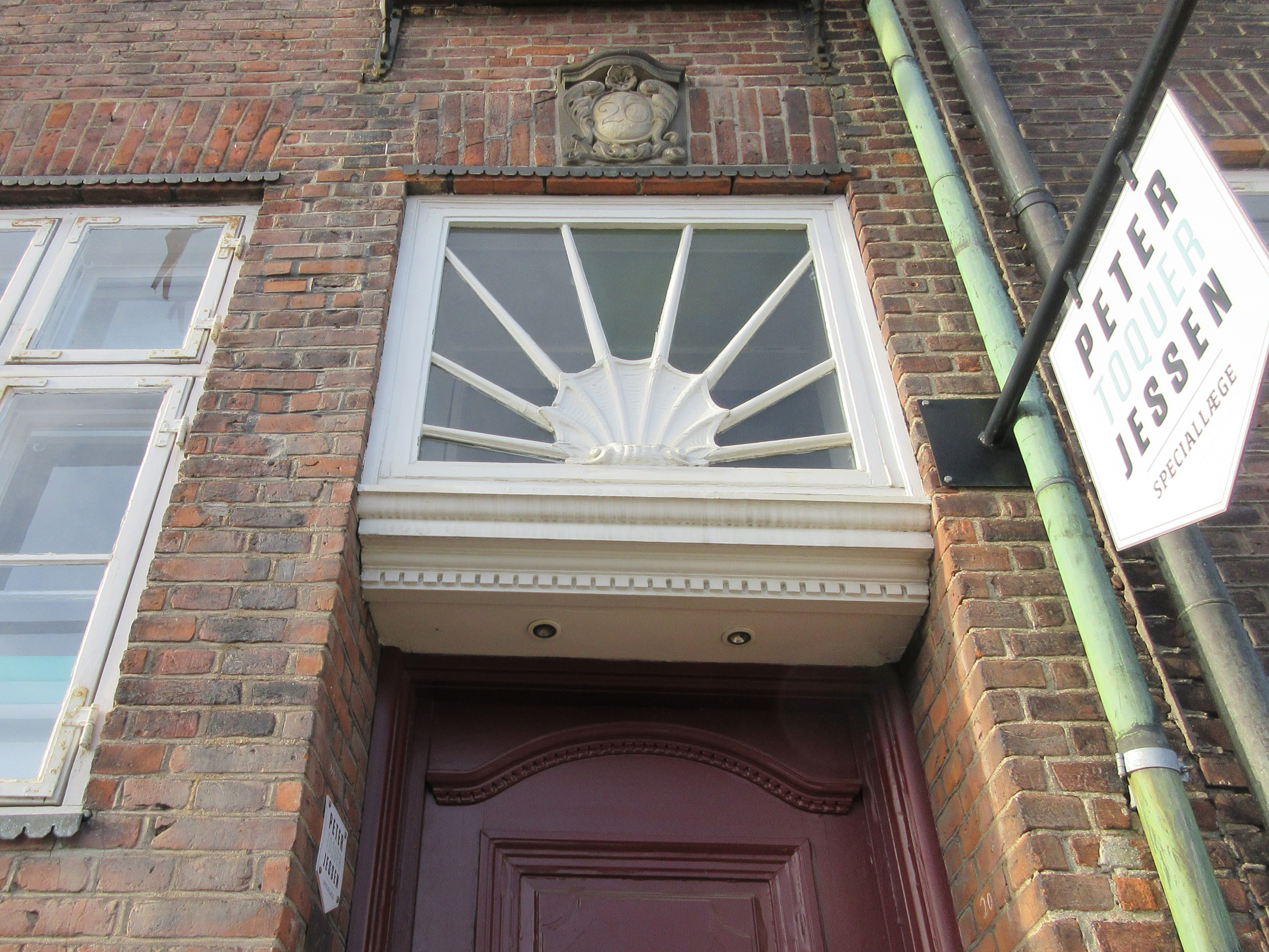
Transom window
