= Nybrogade 16 =

Nybrogae 16
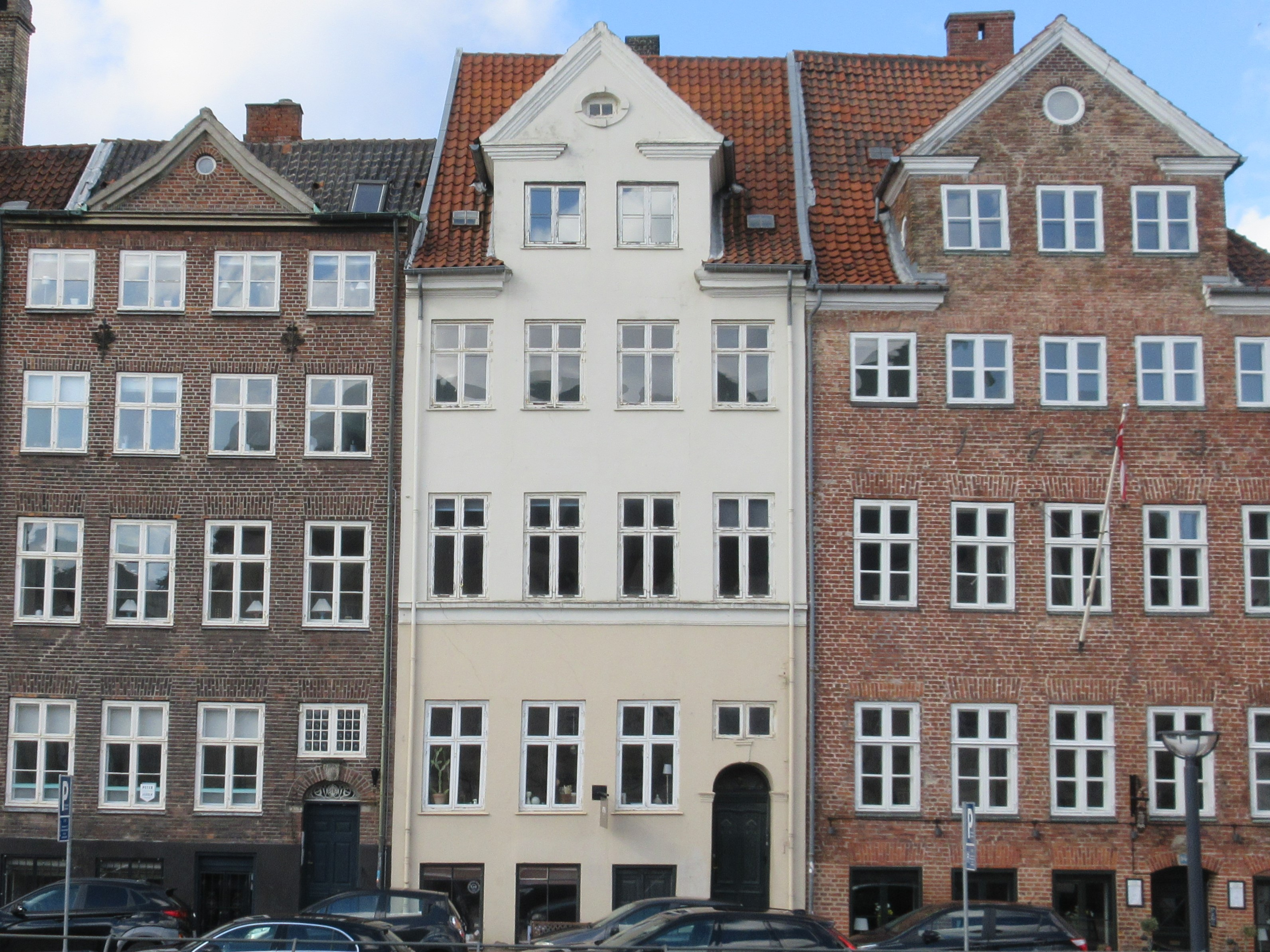
- Interactive map of the Nybrogae 16 area

General information
- Architectural style: Neoclassical
- Location: Copenhagen, Denmark
- Coordinates: 55°40′34.86″N 12°34′33.89″E
- Completed: 1735

Nybrogade 16 is an 18th-century canal house overlooking Slotsholmens Kanal and Slotsholmen in central Copenhagen, Denmark. The narrow property comprises the building at Magstræde 3 on the other side of the bloc. The two buildings are attached to each other via a double stairwell along one side of a small cobbled courtyard. The complex was listed in the Danish registry of protected buildings and places in 1918.

== History ==
=== 18th century ===
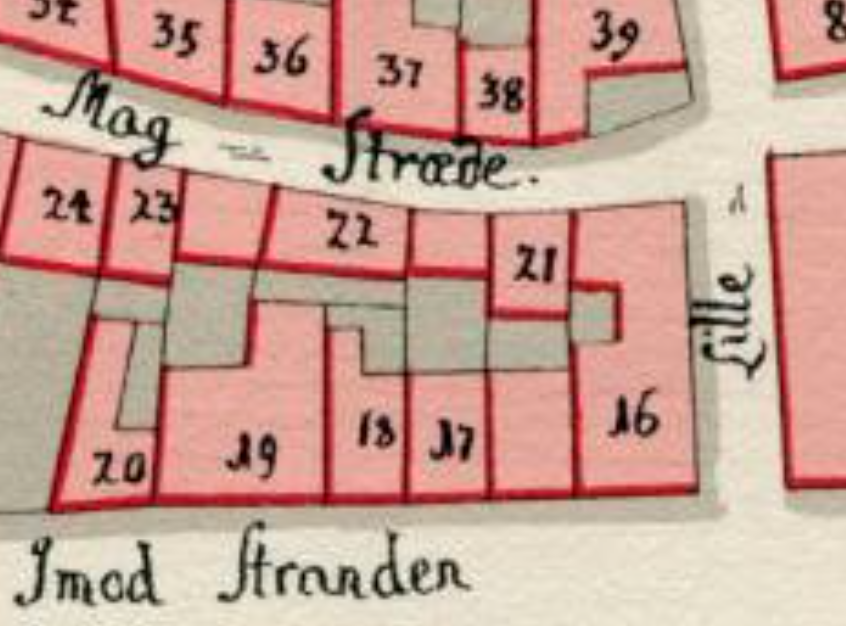
No. 21 seen on a detail from Christian Gedde's map of Snaren's Quarter, 1757.

The property was in 1689 as No. 26 in Snaren's Quarter owned by stadsmægler Johan Ronum. The property was together with most of the other buildings in the area destroyed in the Copenhagen Fire of 1728. The current buildings were constructed in 1734-35 for butcher Israel Magnus Gabriel.

The property was from around 1740 owned by court joiner Christian Jacob Preisler. In the new cadastre of 1756, his property was listed as No. 21 in Snaren's Quarter. On Gedde's map of Snaren's "uarter from 1757 Nybrogade was referred to as Imod Kanalen (Towards the Canal).

=== 19th century ===
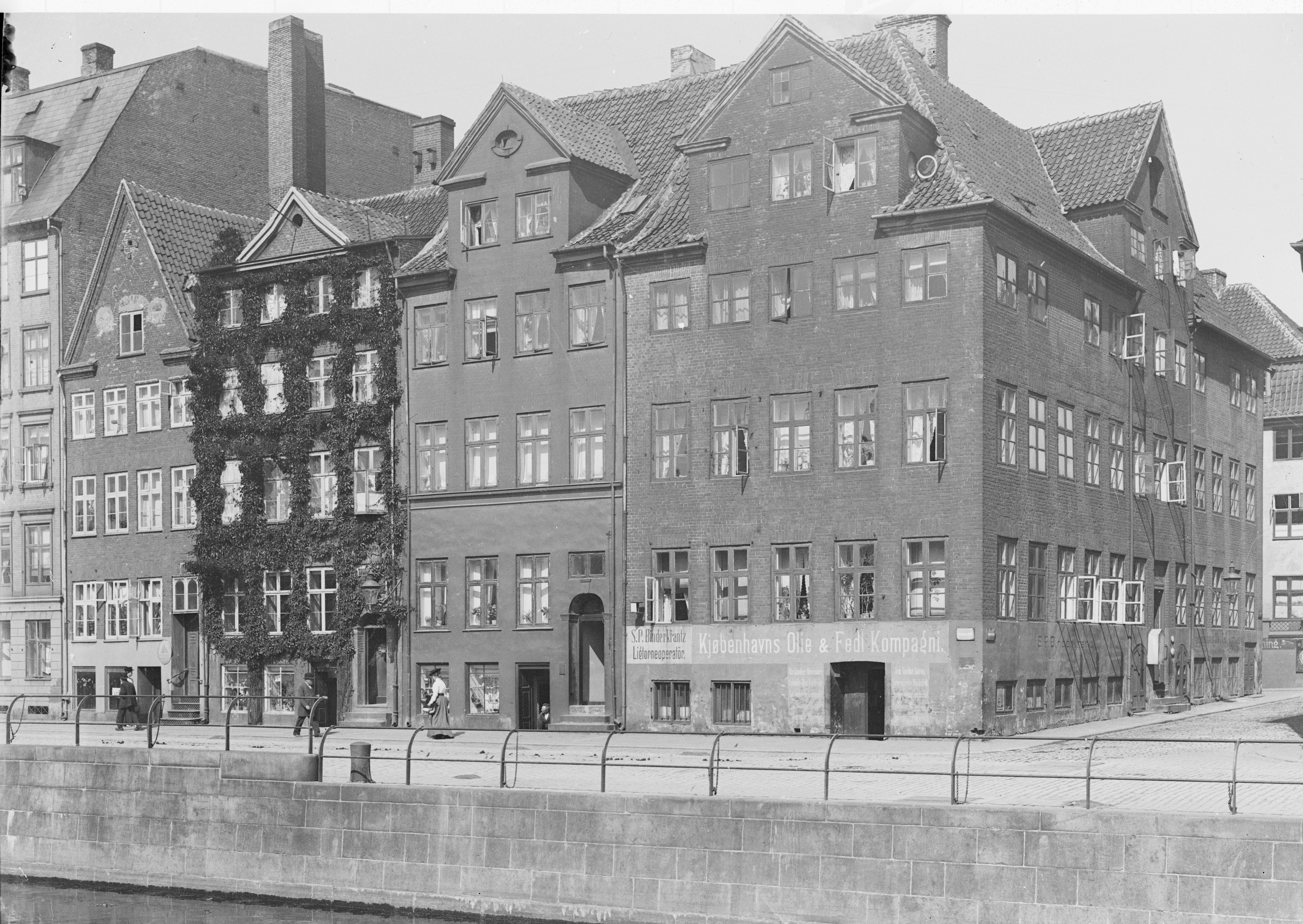
The building seen on a photography by Fritz Theodor Benzen from the 1900s.

The property was listed in the new cadastre of 1806 as No. 18 in Snaren's Quarter. It was owned by Jochum Tronier at that time.

The building was home to a total of 31 people at the time of the 1840 census. Actor at the Royal Danish Theatre C. N. Rosenkilde (1786-1861) was among the residents in 1856-57.

Magstræde 3 was at the time of the 1860 census home to a total of 11 people.

=== 2+th century ===
Nybrogade 16 was at the time of the 1906 census home to a total of 16 people.

== Architecture ==
=== Nybrogade 16 ===
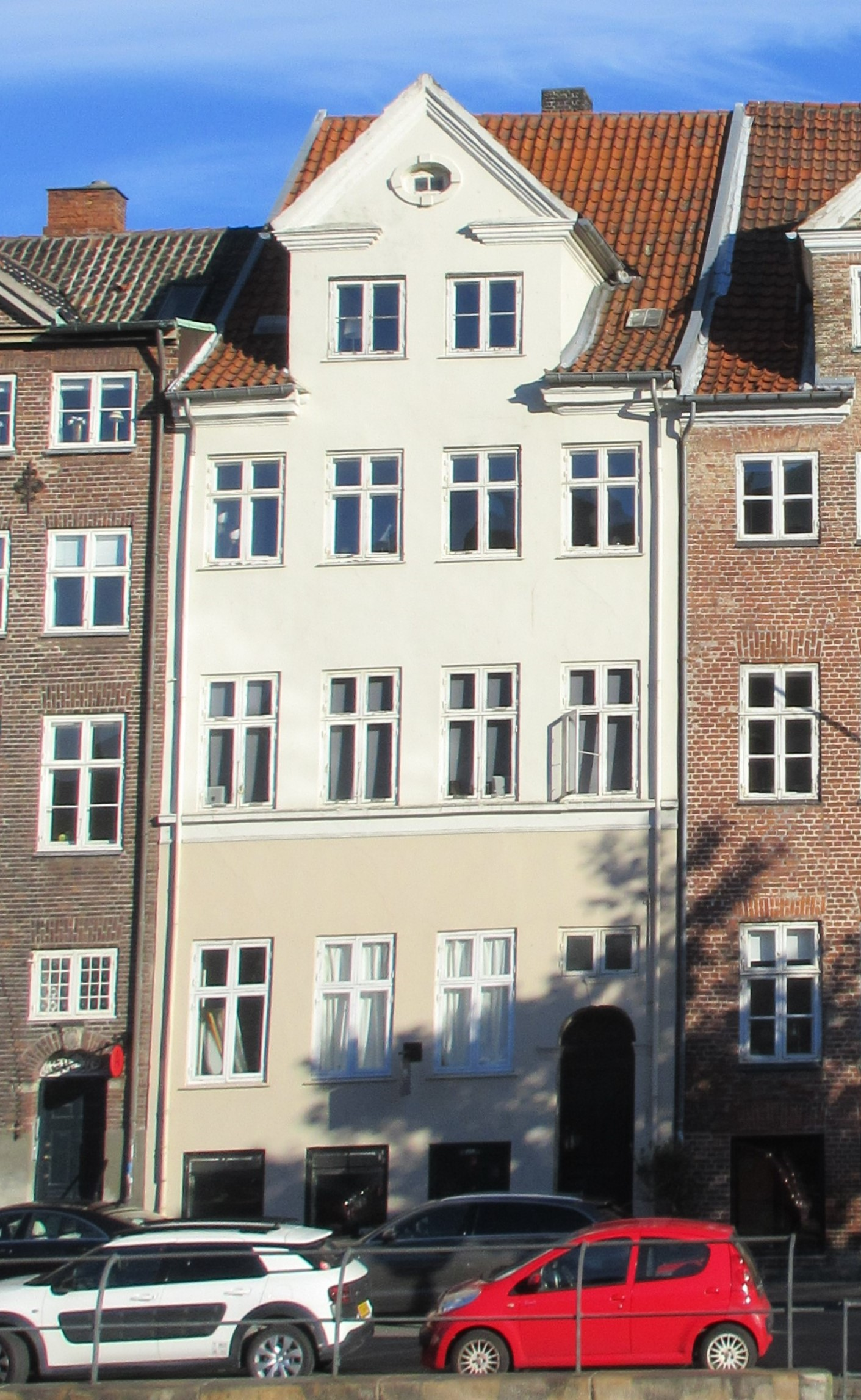
The main entrance photographed by LFritz Theodor Benzen in the 1900s.

Nybrogade 16 is in three storeys over a raised cellar. The front side of the building is constructed in brick on a plinth of granite ashlars and rendered in a pale colour. It is four bays wide and crowned by a two-bay gabled wall dormer with a round window. The arched doorway is raised a few steps from the street. The building is on its rear attached to Magstræde 3 via a double stairwell. The building is towards the yard constructed with red-painted timber framing with iron vitriol-coloured inf9ills.

=== Magstræde 3 ===
Magstræde is also in three storeys over a raised cellar. The building is four bays wide and topped by a two-bay wall dormer. It is constructed in red, undressed brick with white painted windows. The arched doorway is located in the left side of the building.

== Today ==
The building is owned by Erik Vestergaard-Jensen. Nybrogade 16 and Magstræde 3 are both home to a retail space in the basement and residential apartments on the upper floors. A single two-storey apartment occupies the entire second and third floor of Nybrogade 16.
