= Knabrostræde 30 =

Building in Copenhagen, Denmark

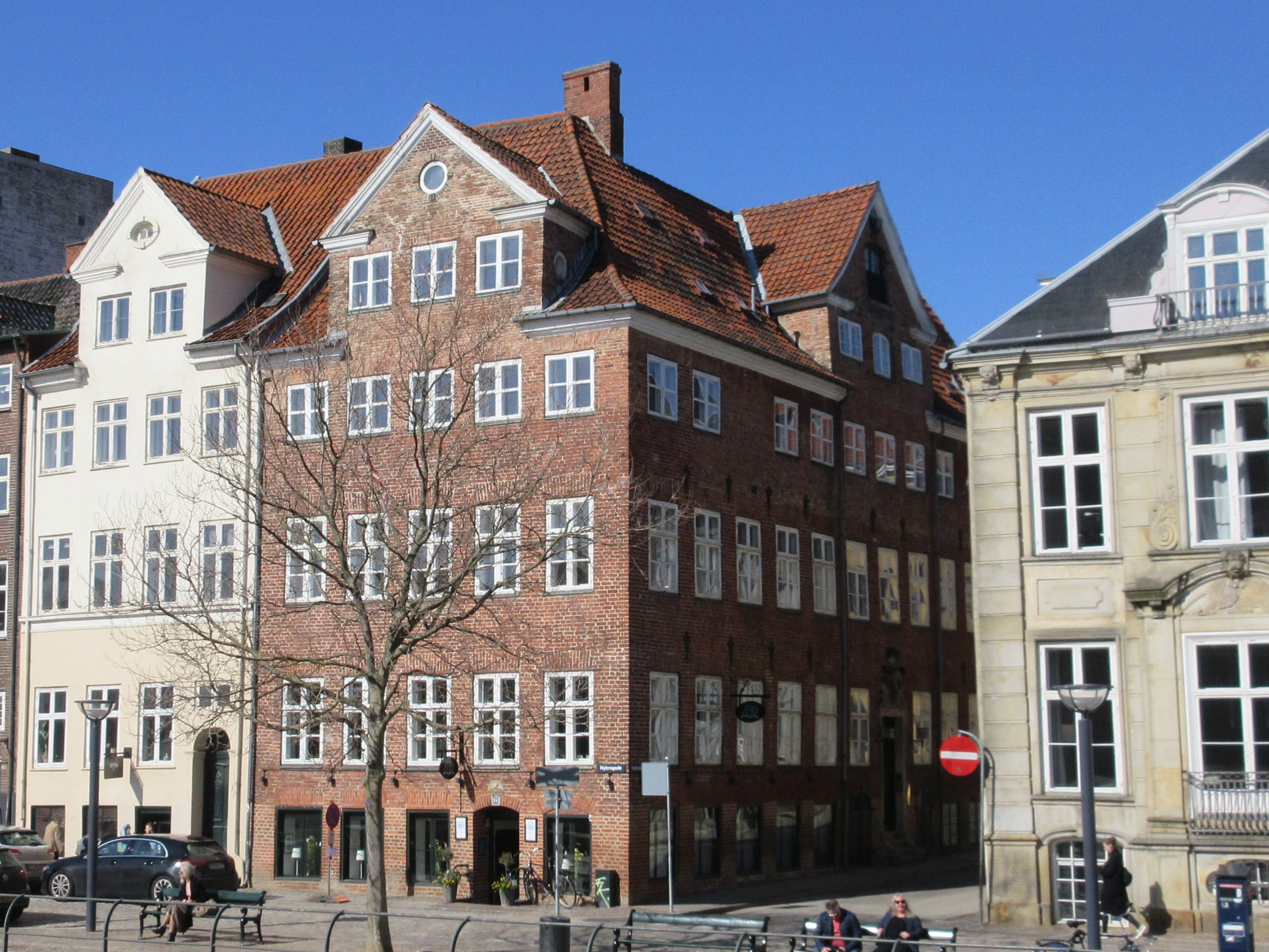
- Interactive map of the Knabrostræde 30 area

General information
- Architectural style: Neoclassical
- Location: Copenhagen, Denmark
- Coordinates: 55°40′35.69″N 12°34′34.36″E
- Completed: 1733

Knabrostræde 30, also known as Det Ferske Fiskehandler-Kompagnis Hus (The Fresh Fish-Trading Company's House), is an 18th-century former fish warehouse situated on the Gammel Strand-Nybrogade canalfront, opposite Thorvaldsens Museum, in central Copenhagen, Denmark. Kay Bojesen's silver workshop was from 1913 to 1930 based in the basement at Nybrogade 14. The building has now been converted into office space and a restaurant. It was listed in the Danish registry of protected buildings and places in 1918.

== History ==
=== Early history ===
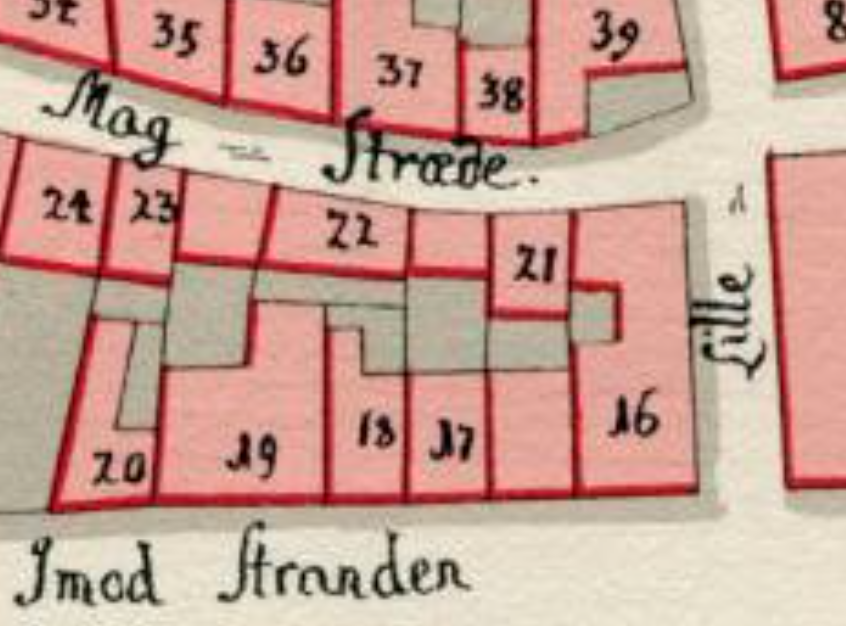
No. 16 seen on a detail from Christian Gedde's map of Snaren's Quarter, 1756.

The site was formerly made up of three smaller properties. One of them was listed in Copenhagen's first cadastre of 1689 as No. 19 in Snaren's Quarter and belonged to beer seller (øltapper) Jens Høg at that time. Another one was listed as No. 20 and belonged to Anders Olsen. The third one was listed as No. 24 and belonged to merchant Peder Christensen. The three properties were in 1733 merged into a single property by Det Ferske Fiskehandels Compagnie (The Fresf Fish Trading Company) ) and used for the construction of the current building on the site.The company may have been a continuation of the city Fishmongers' Guild. Kjøbenhavns Diplomatarium om Kjøbenhavns ældre forhold før 1728 mentions the establishment of a Fishmongers' Guild in Copenhagen on 14 April 1696 with a monopoly on trade in all kinds of fresh fish in the city. The monopoly was created to keep prices down but had the opposite effect and was therefore dissolved in 1702. Det Ferske Fiskehandels Compagnie may have been a continuation of this guild's activities since it is known to have been continued in some form but it is unknown under what name.

The property was in 1756 as No. 16 owned by Knud Carlsen. He served as royal fishing master of Copenhagen, Frederiksborg and Kronborg counties from 1751 to 1762. He is also remembered for building the house now known as Carlsberg at Hillerød in 1760.

=== Just Ludvigsen and his family ===
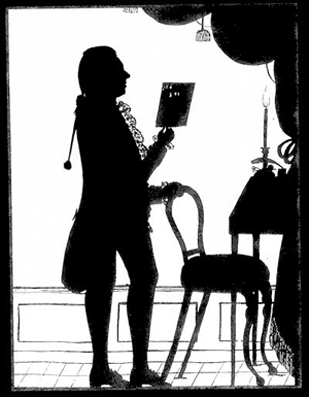
Just Ludvigsen

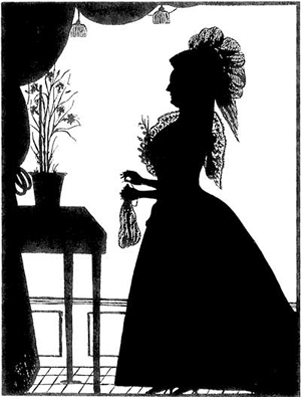
Mette Birgitte Ludvigsen

The building was before 1787 acquired by captain, merchant and ship-owner Just Ludvigsen (1742-1818). He was by then living there with his wife Mette Birgitte (née Tranberg, 1761–1813) and their daughtersDorethea, Anne Catrine, Lovise Marie and Inger Marie. Ludvigsen owned a number of smaller ships which sailed on European ports. Their daughter Dorothea Ludwigsen (1779-) married the bookkeeper and later bank manager Gunni Olsen Busck (1765-1821). A total of 22 people distributed on five households were at the time of the 1787 census registered on the address. Casper Claudius Bierck (1736-1809), a naval officer, then with rank of captain, was with his wife also among the residents. The other tenants were a royal kitchen clerk (kongelig køkkenskriver), an accountant in Rentekammeret (renteskriver) and a beer vendor (øltapper). The actor Hans Christian Knudsen (1763-1816) was among the residents from 1797 to 1802. He was the first actor to be created a Knight in the Order of the Dannebrog.

Ludvigsen's property in Knabrostræde was in the new cadastre of 1806 listed as No. 15. Ludvigsen's daughter Birgitte and her husband Peder Horrebow Homann (1683—1861) were by 1840 residing with their three children on the ground floor. The son Just Homann (1819-1850) published two books in the 1840s but was killed in the Battle of Isted at Bollingstedt on 25 July 1850.

The building was at the time of the 1860 census home to a total of 20 people. Peder and Birgieete Homann were still among the residents.

=== Later history ===
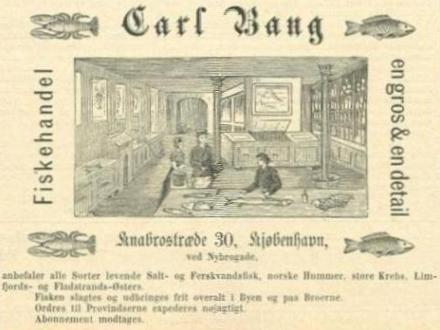
Advert for Carl Bang brought in Illustreret Tidende on 20 October 1878.

The illustrator Peter Christian Nygaard Mattat Klæstrup resided on the first floor at Knabrostræde 30 in the years around 1864. Carl Bang, a combined fish wholesale and retail business, was in the last part of the century based in the basement. The company was later based in the now demolished building at Gammel Strand 28.

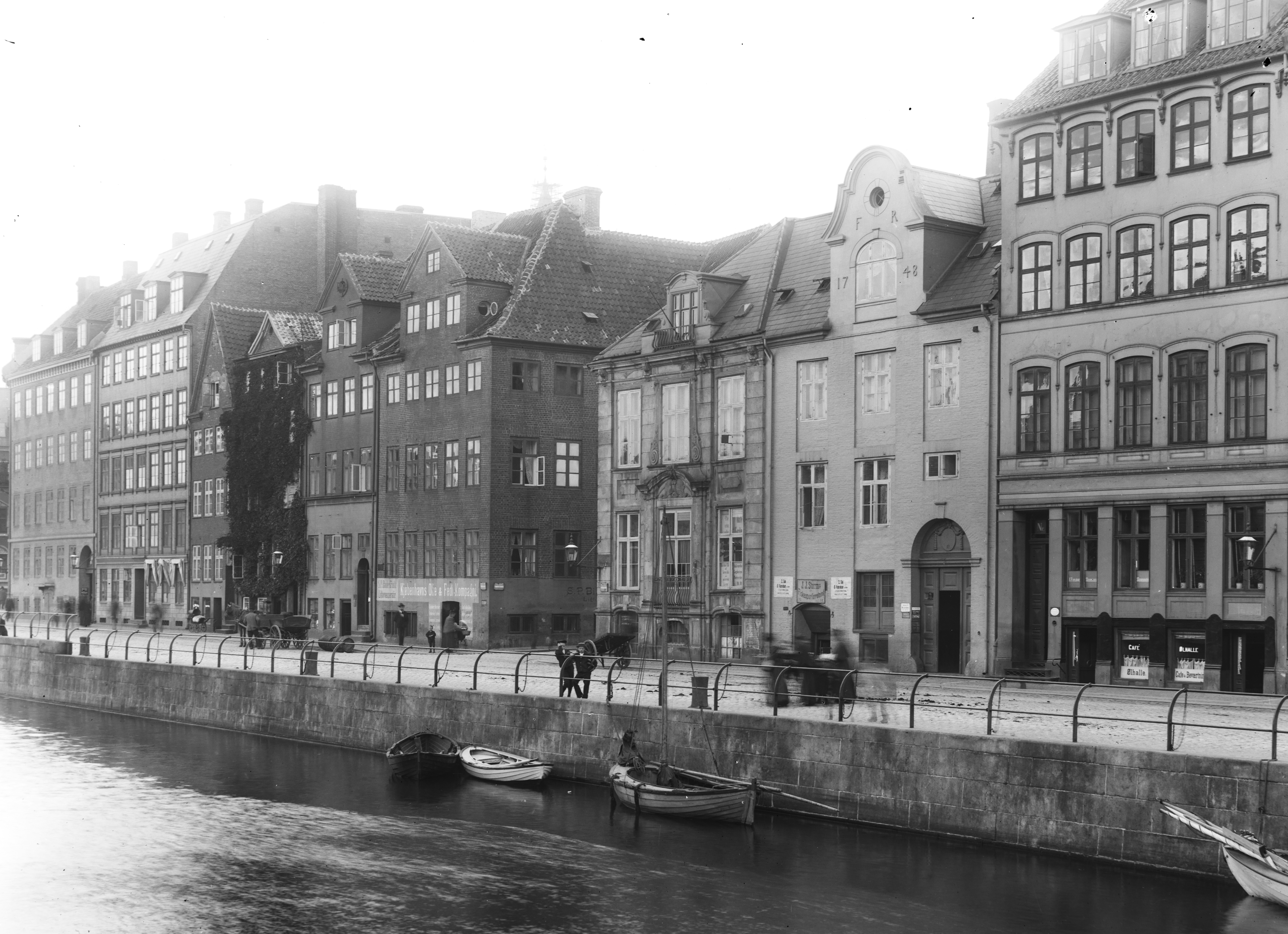
The building seen on a photograph by Frederik Riise.

The silversmith O. Dajl had his silver workshop in the basement at Nybrogade 14 in the years around 1900. In 1913, it was taken over by Kay Bojesen. In 1930, he sold it to assume a position as artistic director of Bing & Grøndahl.

The building was in more recent times acquired by Bent Fabricius-Bjerre and his two sons via the property companyb Metorion. In January 2021, it was announced that Vision Ejendomme/Vision Properties had acquired Knabrostræde 30as part of a portfolio of eight historic buildings.

== Architecture ==
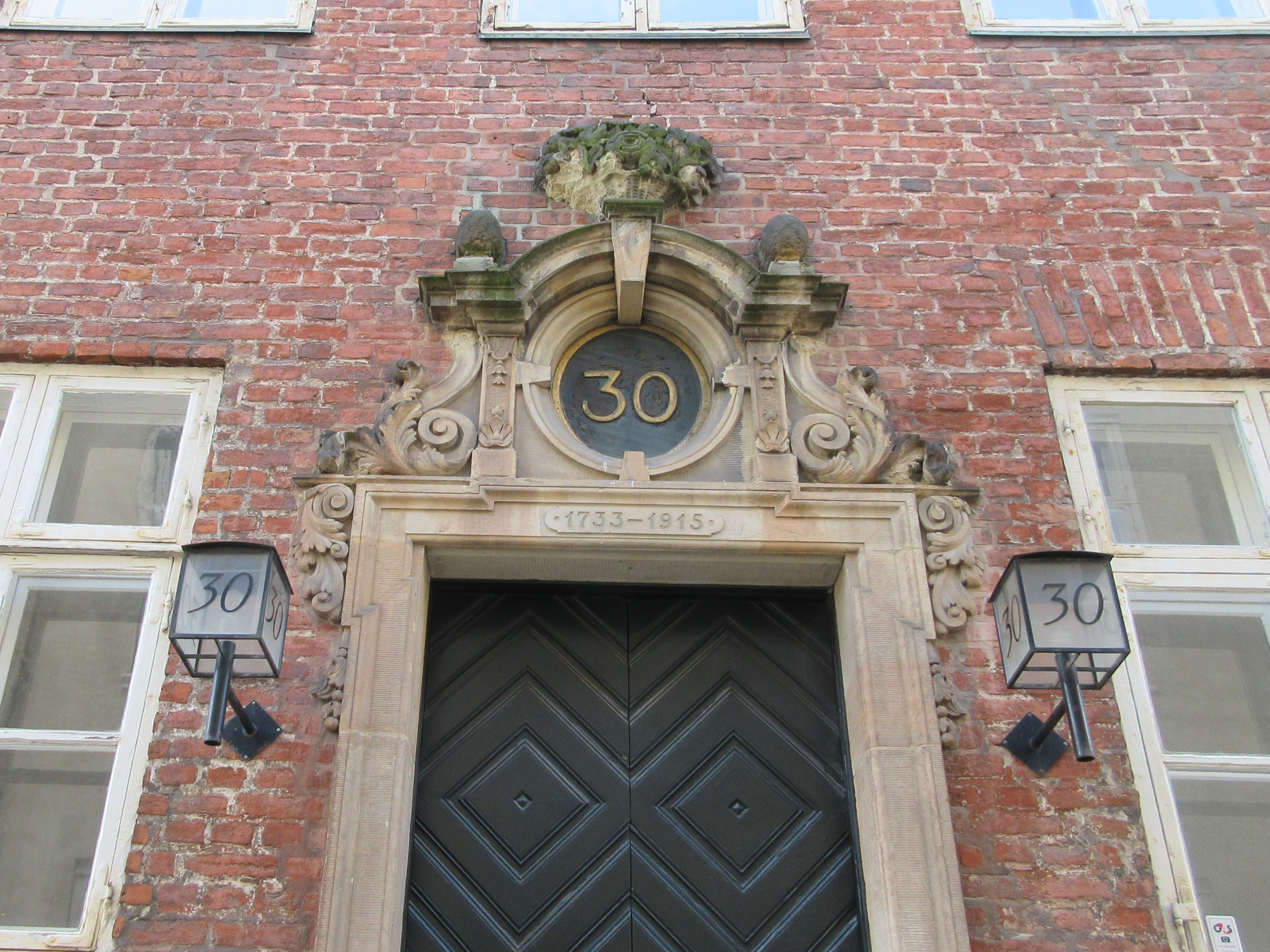
Knabrostræde 30

The building is constructed in red brick with three storeys over a walk-out basement around an asymmetrically shaped light well. It has a 12 bays long facade towards Knabrostræde, four bays towards Magstræde and five bays towards Nybrogade. The facade towards Knabrostræde is crowned by a three-bay gabled wall dormer with a pulley beam. The main entrance in one of the two central bays is surrounded by a lavishly decorated sandstone portal, incorporating a round window with the house number (30). The sandstone portal was added as late as 1915 and is a copy of a sandstone portal from Dronningensgade. A basement entrance is located in the other central bay. The facade is decorated with two rows of Fleur-de-lis-shaped wall anchors between the upper floors.

The facade towards Nybrogade is crowned by a three-bay gabled wall dormer with cornice returns. The basement entrance in the second bay from the right is topped by a key stone decorated with a buoy. This decorative element was also added in 1915. The construction year (1733) is written on the wall with large metal numbers between the windows on the second and third floors. The four-bay gable towards Magstræde is also finished with gable returns.

== Today ==
The building is owned by Vision Properties, a property company jointly owned by Lars Larsen Group and Schou Family Invest. Restaurant 1733 is based in the basement at Nybrogade 14. The rest of the building is let out as office space.m with shared canteen facilities in the garret.

== Gallery ==
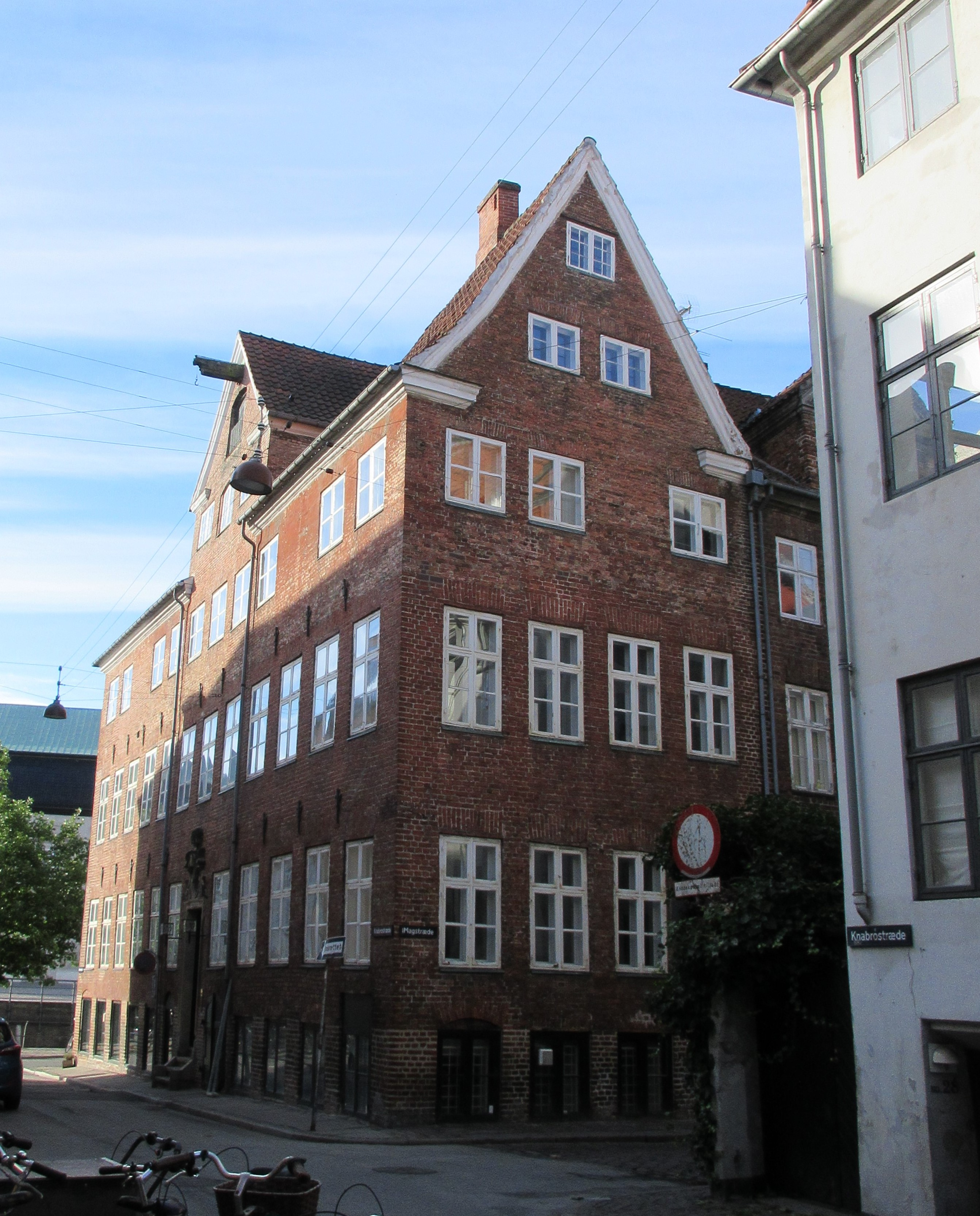
Corner of Magstræde (right) and Knabrostræde (left)

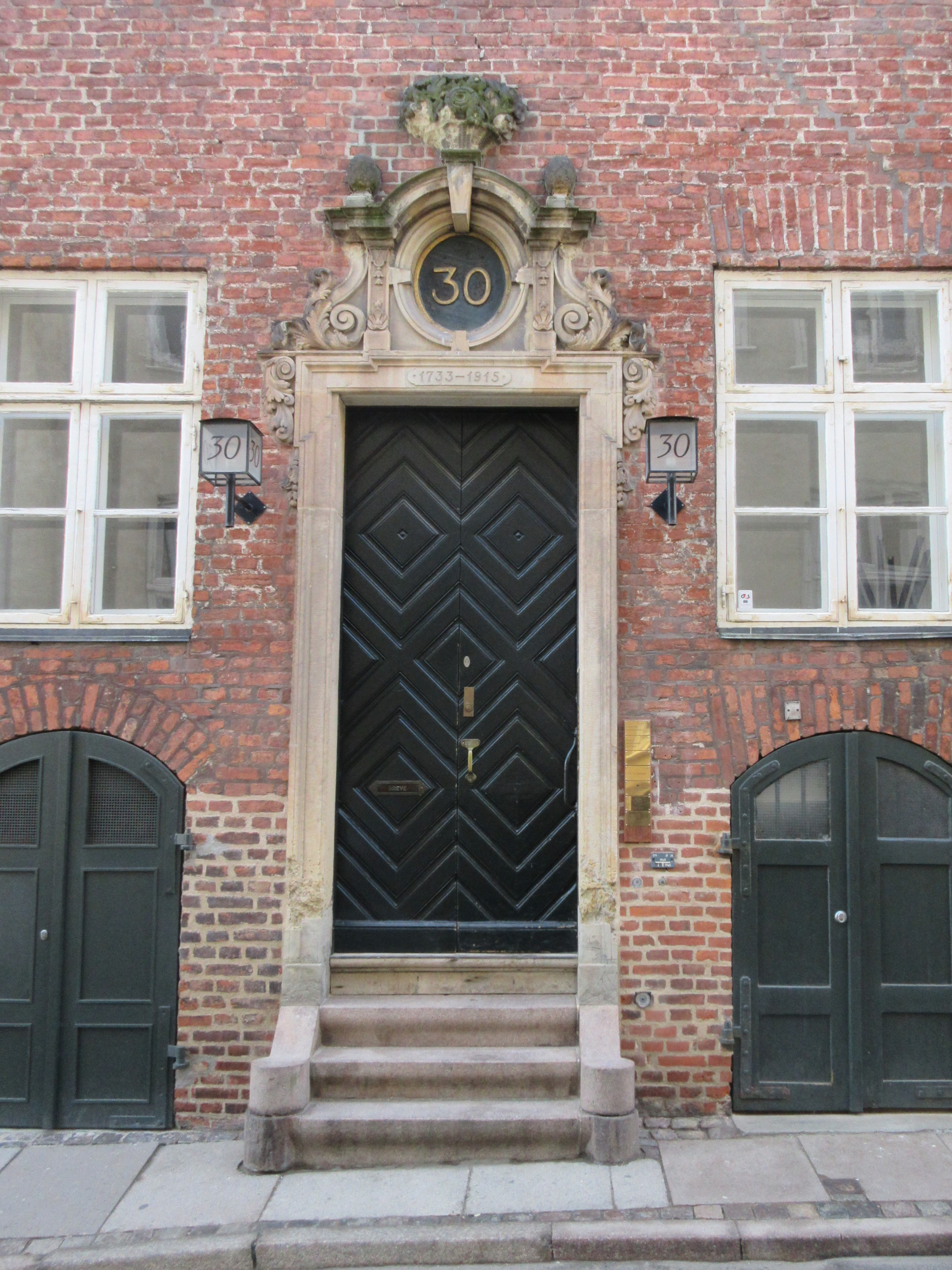
Door

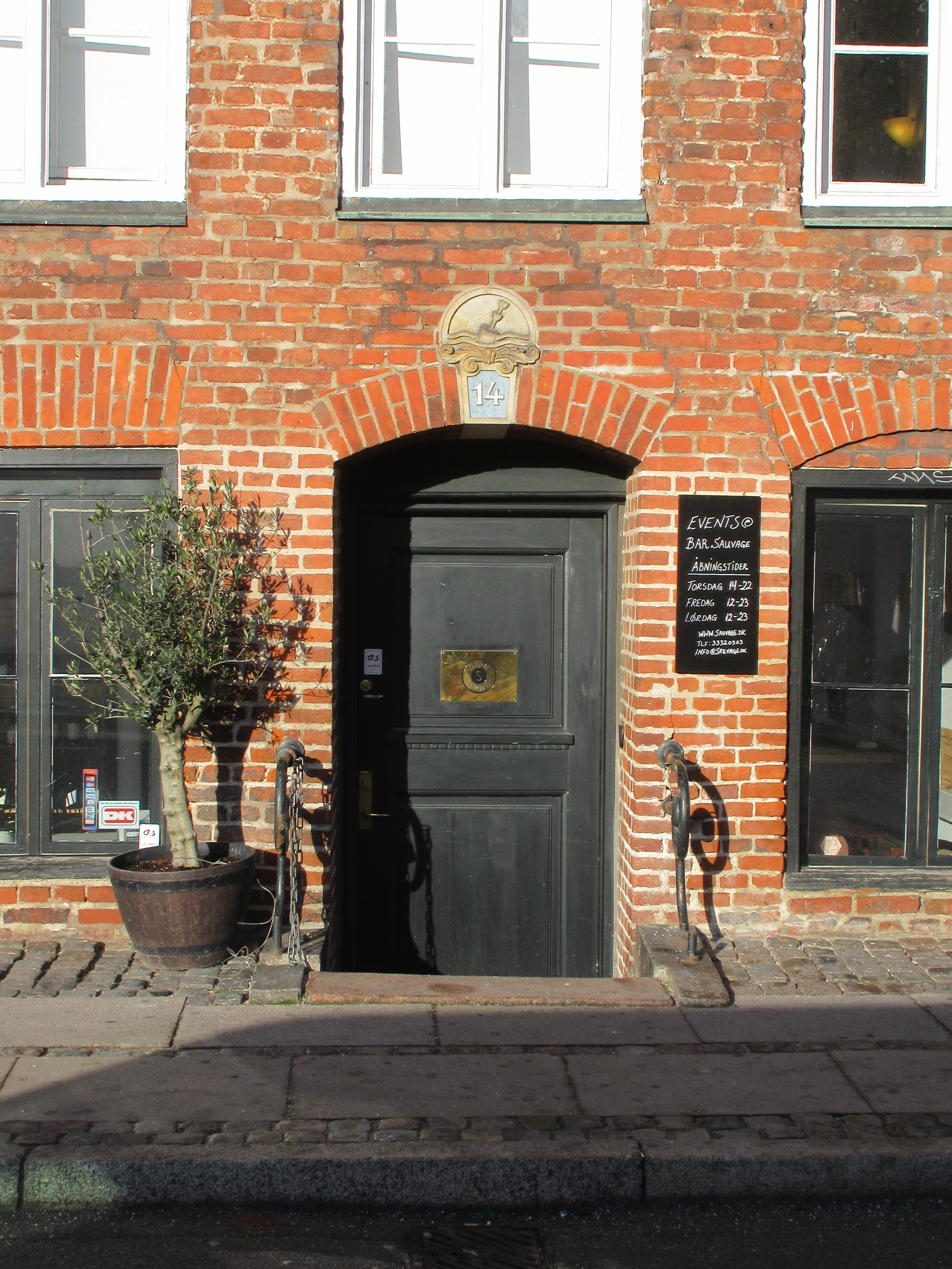
Detail from Nybrogade 14

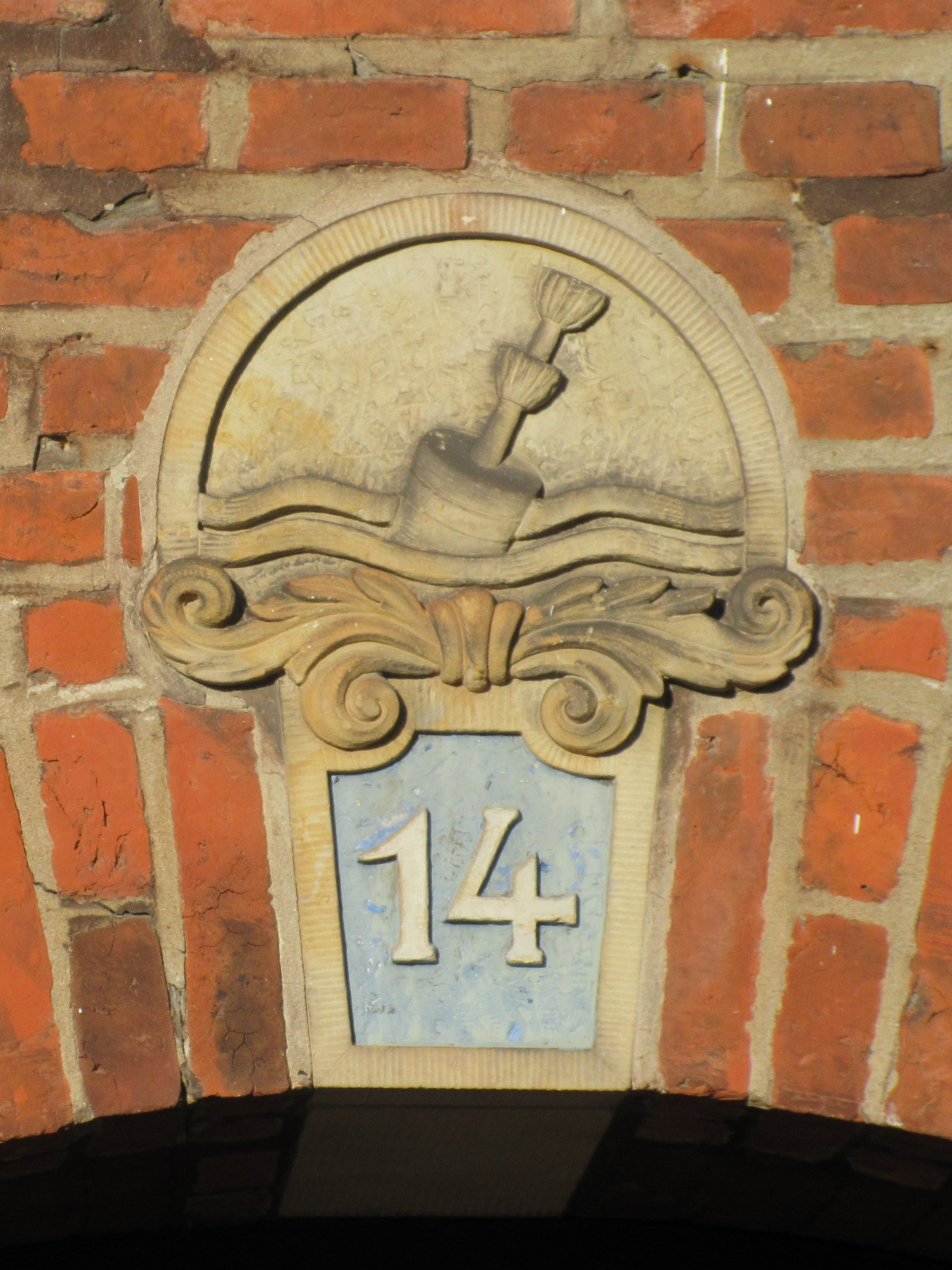
Keystone at Nybrogade 14

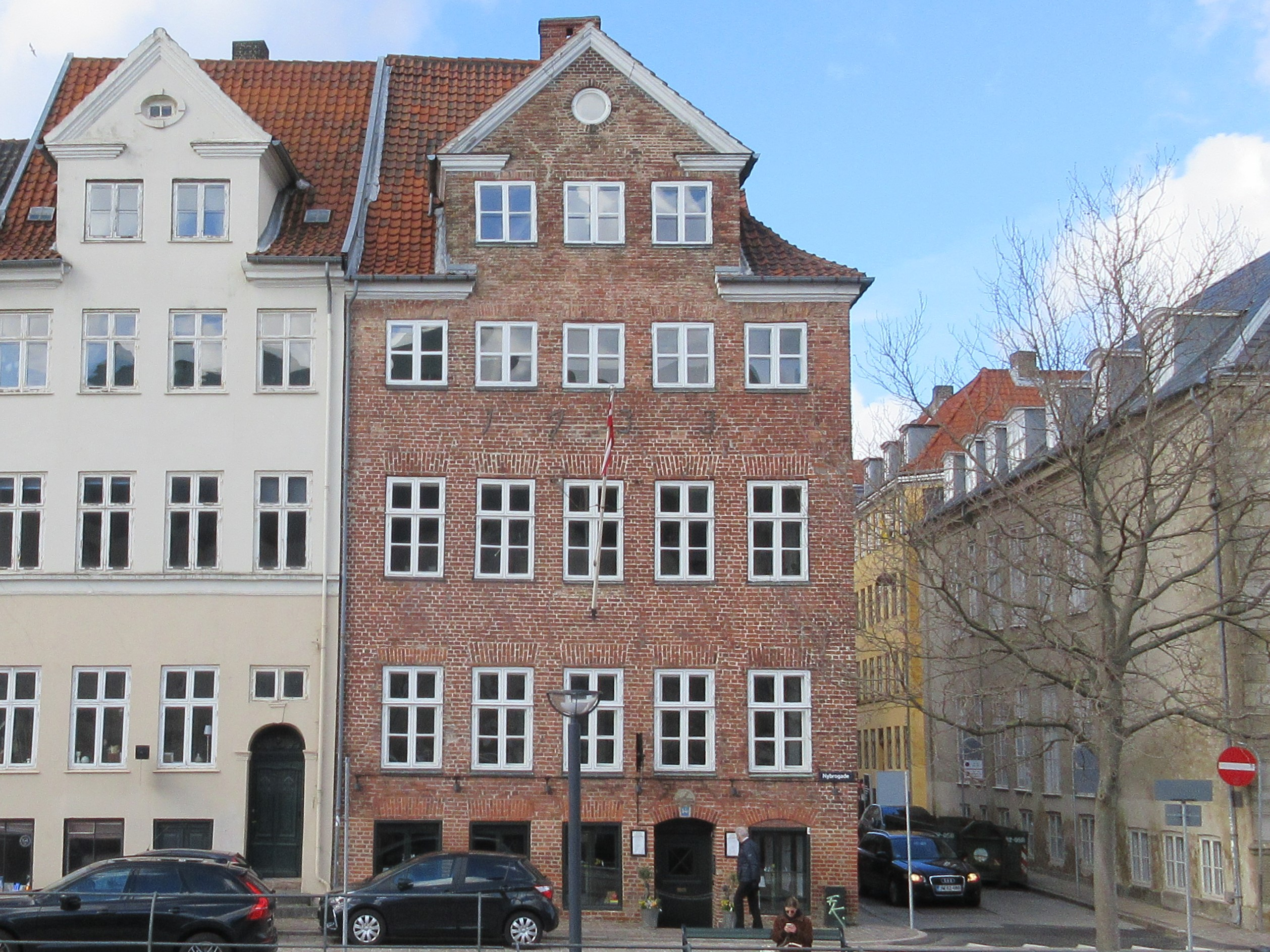
Nybrogade 14

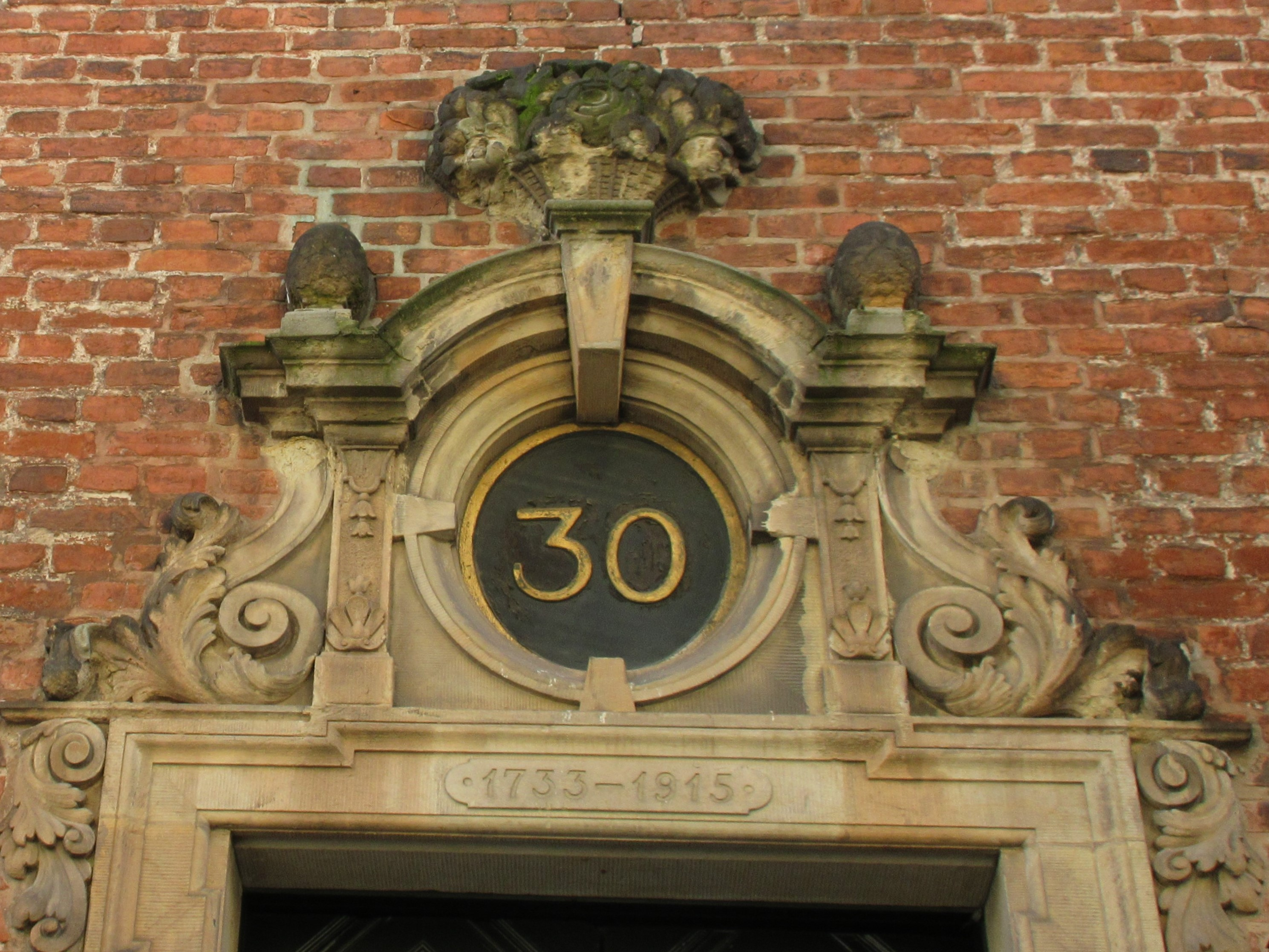
Detail from Knabrostræde 30
