= Wildersgade Barracks =

Building in Copenhagen, Denmark

Coordinates: 55.6742°N 12.5926°E

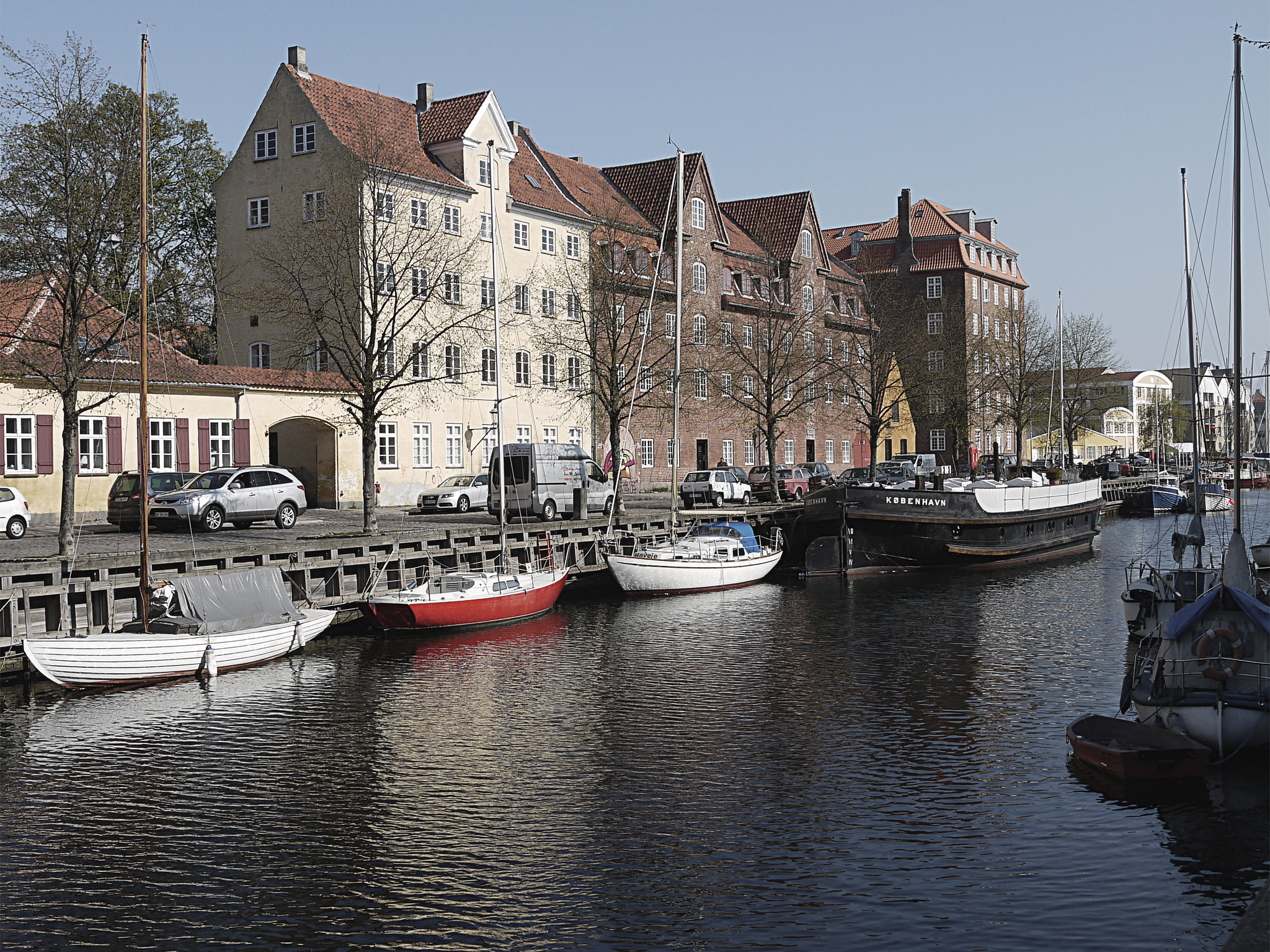
The rear side of the barracks

Wildersgade Barracks (Danish: Wildersgades Kaserne) was a barracks which existed from 1802 until 1822 in the Christianshavn district of Copenhagen, Denmark. Its former premises, which include a purpose-built main building on Wildersgade and converted warehouses, two of them facing Christianshavn Canal, are now listed. They surround a central courtyard which has been converted into a community garden.

== History ==
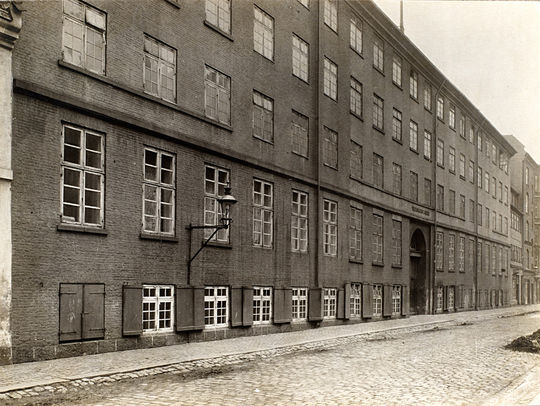
The main building in 1924

The main building was built by the architects and developers Jørgen Henrich Rawert and Andreas Hallander who let it to the Marine Infantry Corps(Marineregimentet). Located to the rear of the Irgens House, which had served as artillery barracks since 1789, the site had previously housed Denmark's first canvas manufactury, which had been founded by the Weavers Guild. The new facility accommodated 600 men. The military acquired the buildings in 1830 following the death of a later owner, Justice Counselor A. P. Rønne. In 1831 and 1847, the barracks were expanded with two warehouses situated on the opposite side of the block, fronting Christianshavn Canal,

Towards the end of its existence, the barracks housed the Arsenal Corps (Tøjhusafdelingen), the Service Corps ( Arbejdstropperne), the Medical Corps (Sundhedstropperne), and parts of the Provisions Corps (hærens sanitetsenheder) og dele af Forplejningskorpset). The installation was closed in 1922.

== The site today ==
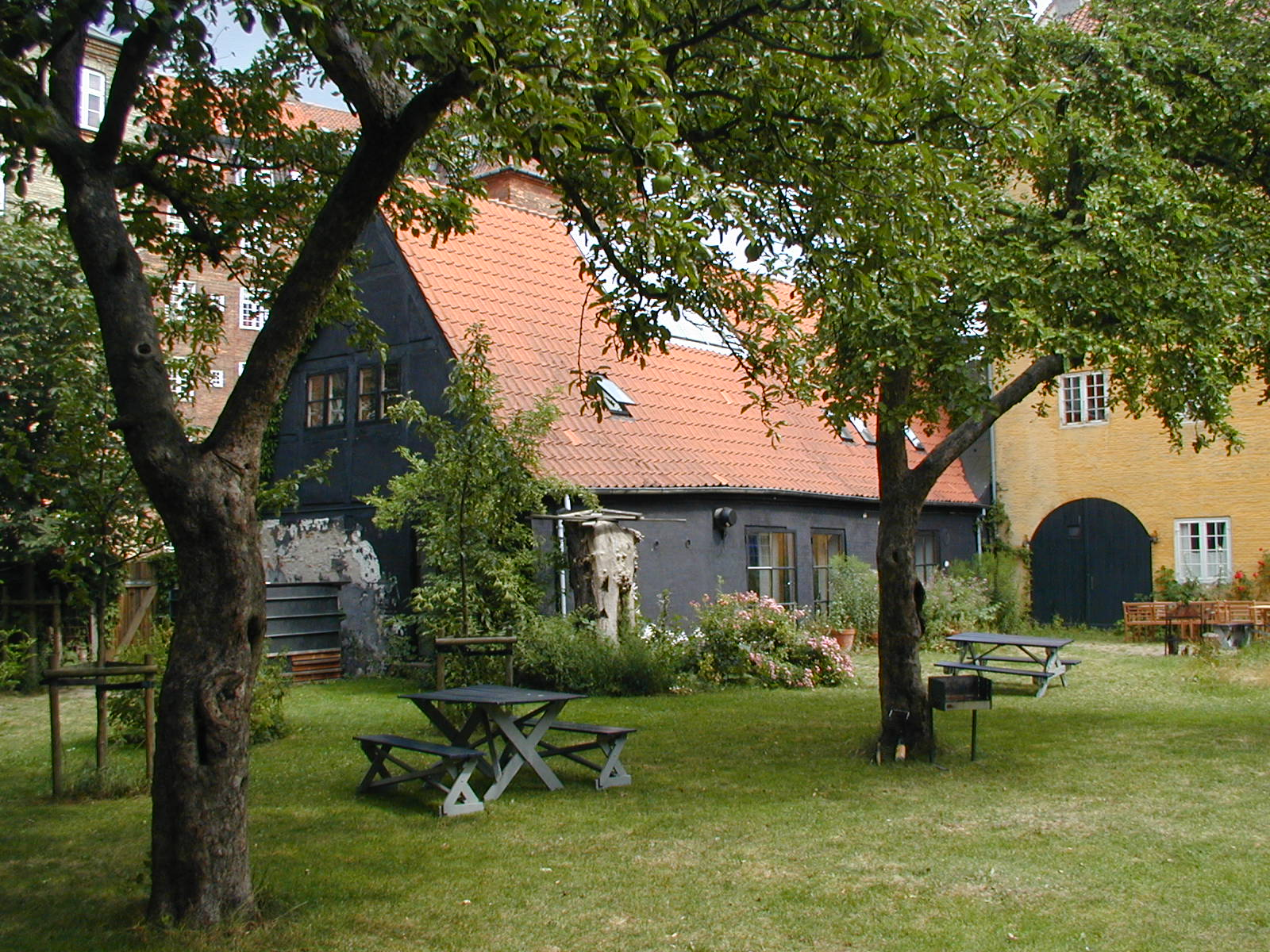
The courtyard garden with the low wing along Bådsmandsstræde in the background

The former main building on Wildersgade is in four stories. A small building on its left hand side contains a gate which opens to the former barracks courtyard, now converted into a garden space. It connects to a long one-story wing which continues almost to the corner of Bådsmandsstræde. Another one-story building runs along Bådsmandsstræde (No. 6). Dating from the 18th century, it was originally a warehouse but formed part of the barracks from its opening in 1802 where it served as horse stables.

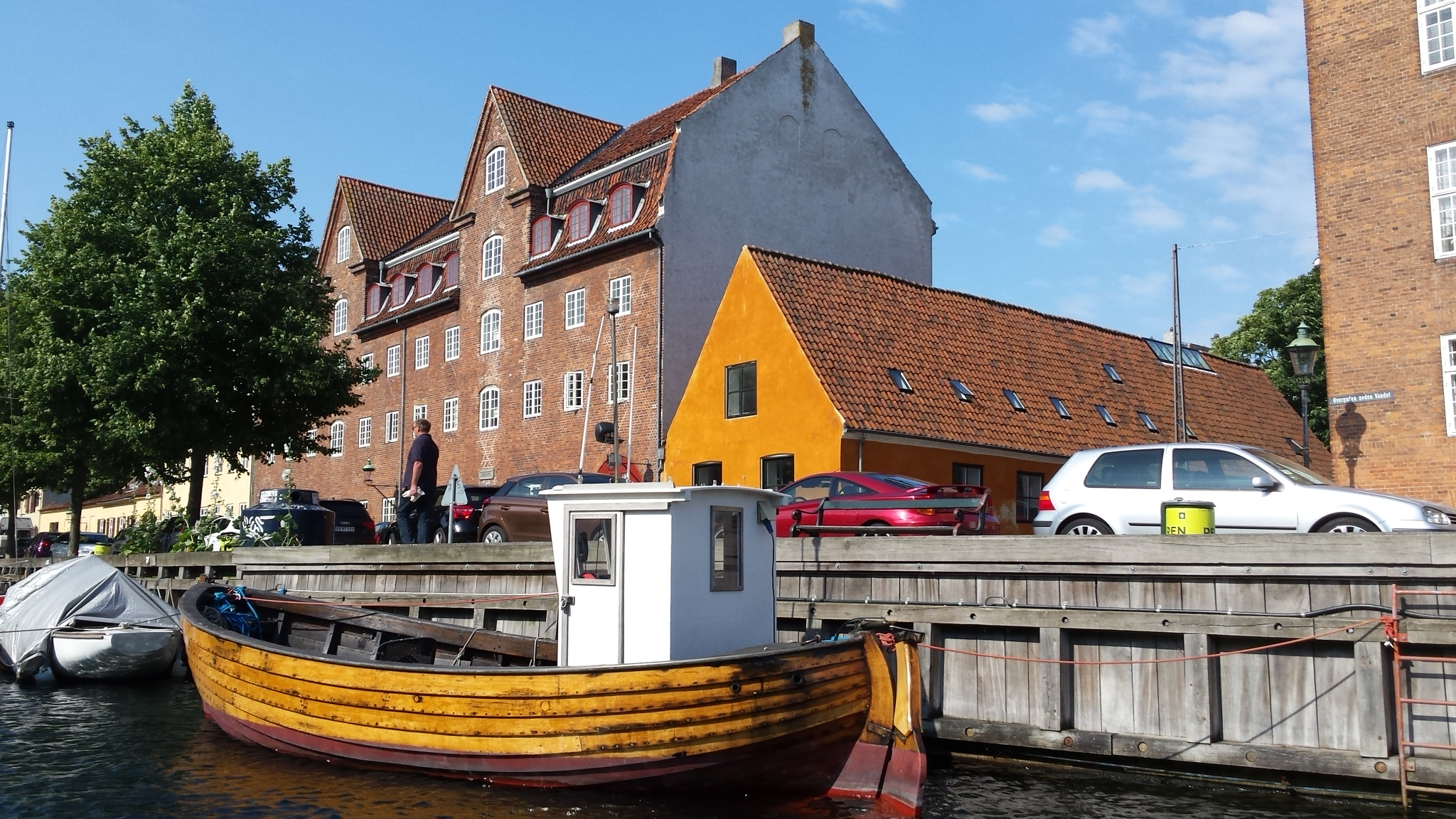
The low building at Bådsmandsstræde 6 seen from the canal

The building was converted into an architectural studio by Tegnestuen Vandkunsten in the 1980s, although the firm later moved to larger premises. Its gable, which faces Christianshavn Canal, adjoins the two large warehouses which expanded the barracks in 1831 and 1847. They were adapted for use as living quarters when they were acquired by the Army but their design still testifies to their original use. The one to the right, known as Tuteins Pakhus (English: The Tutein Warehouse), is from 1762 while the one to the left is slightly older. A wall with another gateway connects the warehouses to the buildings which complete the block to the south along Sankt Annæ Gade.

== See also ==
- Royal Horse Guards Barracks
- Rosenborg Barracks
- Sølvgade Barracks
