= Peter Borre =

Danish merchant

Peter Borre (2 September 1716 – 20 December 1789) was a Danish merchant. He owned the Copenhagen-based trading house Borre & Fenger in a partnership with Peter Fenger from around 1755. The company traded in the Danish West Indies with its own fleet of merchant ships. Borre owned the Irgens House at Strandgade 44 in Copenhagen as well as several other properties in the city.

== Early life and education ==
Borre was born in Aarhus, the son of merchant Mikkel Pedersen Borre (1669–1724) and Anne Mogensdatter Blach (1692–1726). His maternal uncle was Oluf Blach.

== Career ==
In 1750, Borre was granted citizenship as a merchant in Copenhagen. In circa 1755, he established the trading house Borre & Fenger in a partnership with Peter Fenger. From 1761 to 1778 he was administrator of the national tobacco monopoly in return for 12.5 % of the revenues. He was the principal participant in the General Trading Company from 1753 and from 1759 served as its managing director until it was taken over by the crown in 1774. Borre then served as director of the new Royal Iceland Trading Department (Kgl. islandske, finmarkske og færøske handel og Fiskefangst) and the Royal Greenland Trading Department until 1779.

Borre was from 1757 to 1776 a member of the Merchant Society's (Grosserer-Societetet) governing council and its president from 1762. He supported Schimmelmann's proposal to establish a free port in Copenhagen in 1769. He was appointed royal agent in 1761 and etatsråd in 1779.

== Property ==
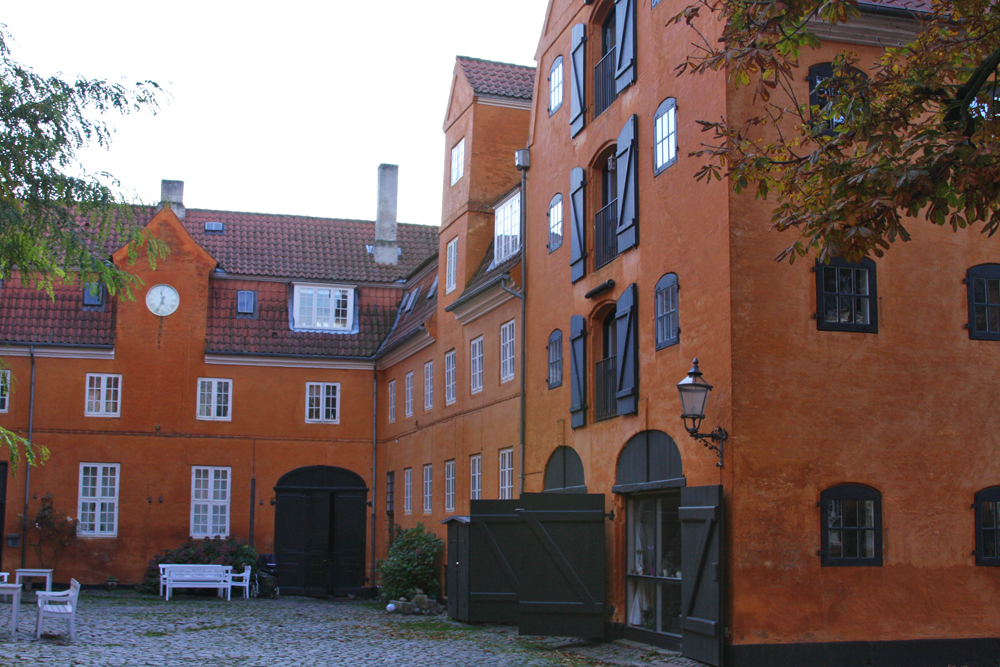
The Irgens House at Strandgade 44 in Copenhagen

Borre owned the Irgens House at Strandgade 44 in Christianshavn from 1851 to 1883. He expanded the complex with a new building for manufacturing tobacco towards Wildersgade. The warehouse at Overgaden neden Vandet 51A-B was built by Borre & Fenger in 1761–1762. From 1762, Borre was also the owner of the neighbouring warehouse at No. 49 and after his death it was owned by his widow until 1802. He spent the summers at his country house Sophieshøj aat Nærum.

== Personal life ==
On 18 June 1751 Borre married Sophia Aagaard (1735–1778), daughter of merchant Oluf Hansen Aaaard (1689–1749) and Anna Elisabeth Tvede (1708–1747). This made him the brother-in-law of Johan Peter Suhr and merchant and later landowner Mathias Wassard. His daughter Birgitte (1757–1809) married Charles August Selby.
