= Irgens House =

Heritage listed building complex in central Copenhagen, Denmark

- Den Irgenske Gård
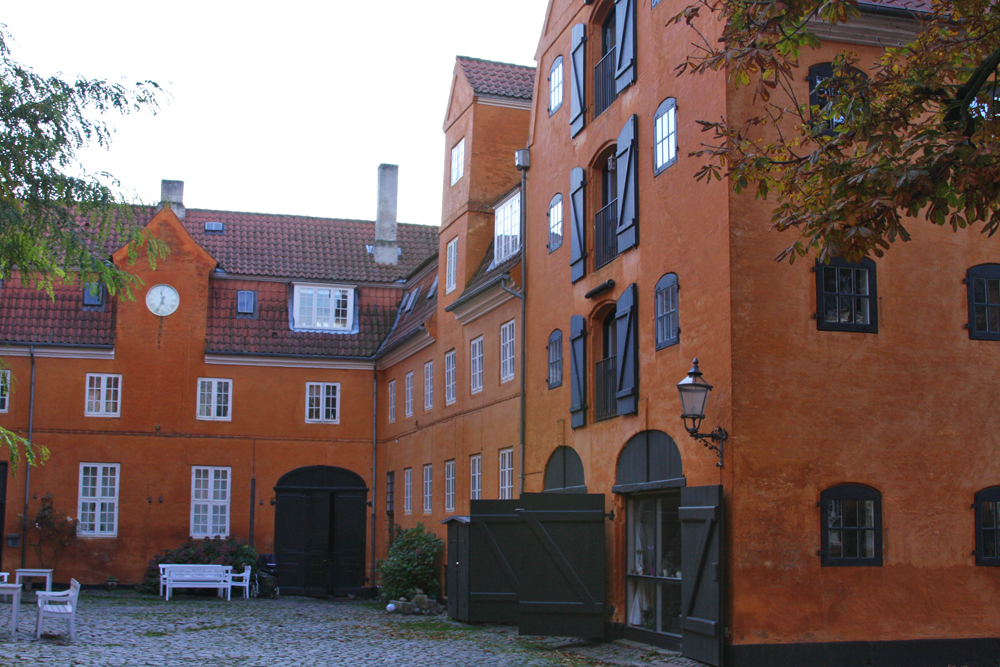
- Interactive map of the Irgens House area
- Alternative names: Old Artillery Barracks

General information
- Location: Copenhagen, Denmark
- Coordinates: 55°40′29″N 12°35′31″E
- Client: Hinrich Ladiges

The Irgens House (Danish: Irgens Gård), also known as the Old Artillery Barracks, is a heritage listed building complex situated on Strandgade in the Christianshavn district of central Copenhagen, Denmark. It takes its name after Joachim Irgens, one of its first owners. The property was later owned by the wealthy general trader Peter Borre. The karge building complex was later adapted for use as artillery barracks. It was kater joined by Wildersgade Barracks and Bpdsmandsgade Barracks on nearby sites. The army left the buildings in 1923. The complex has since been converted into apartments.

== History ==
=== 17th century ===
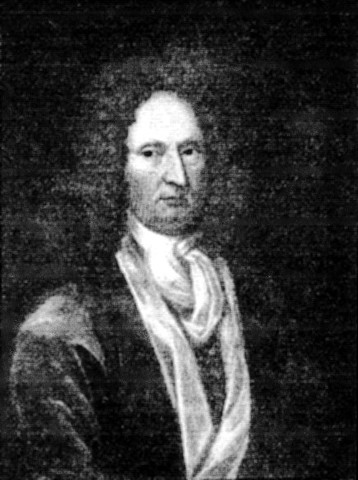
Joachim Irgens.

The first owner of the property was Claus Condevin. The property was located at the northeastern end of Strandgade, next to the original Christianshavn Rampart. It was not until more than one hundred years later that Andreas Bjørn reclaimed the area on the other side of Eilder's Canal, paving the way for a northeastern extension of Strandgade.

In 1623, he sold the still empty lot to Johan Post. The L-shaped building at the corner of Strandgade and Bådsmandsgade was constructed for Post some time between 1623 and 1635. In 1664, Joachim Irgens (1611–75) purchased the property. He had started his career as chamber servant for Christian IV. He had later made a fortune in the mining industry in Norway. His economy had also benefitted from his marriage to a wealthy Dutch woman. He carried out comprehensive alterations and extensions, creating most of the building complex seen today. He later also acquired Vestervig Abbey in North Jutland and Hjorslev on Stevns as payment of loans to the Crown. In 1784, he was ennobled under the name von Vestervig. He died in 1675.

In 1680, Nicolai Jensen Arf acquired the property. In 1690–1697, he held a monopoly on trade on the Danish Gold Coast. In 1700, he had to sell the property at auction.

=== 18th century ===
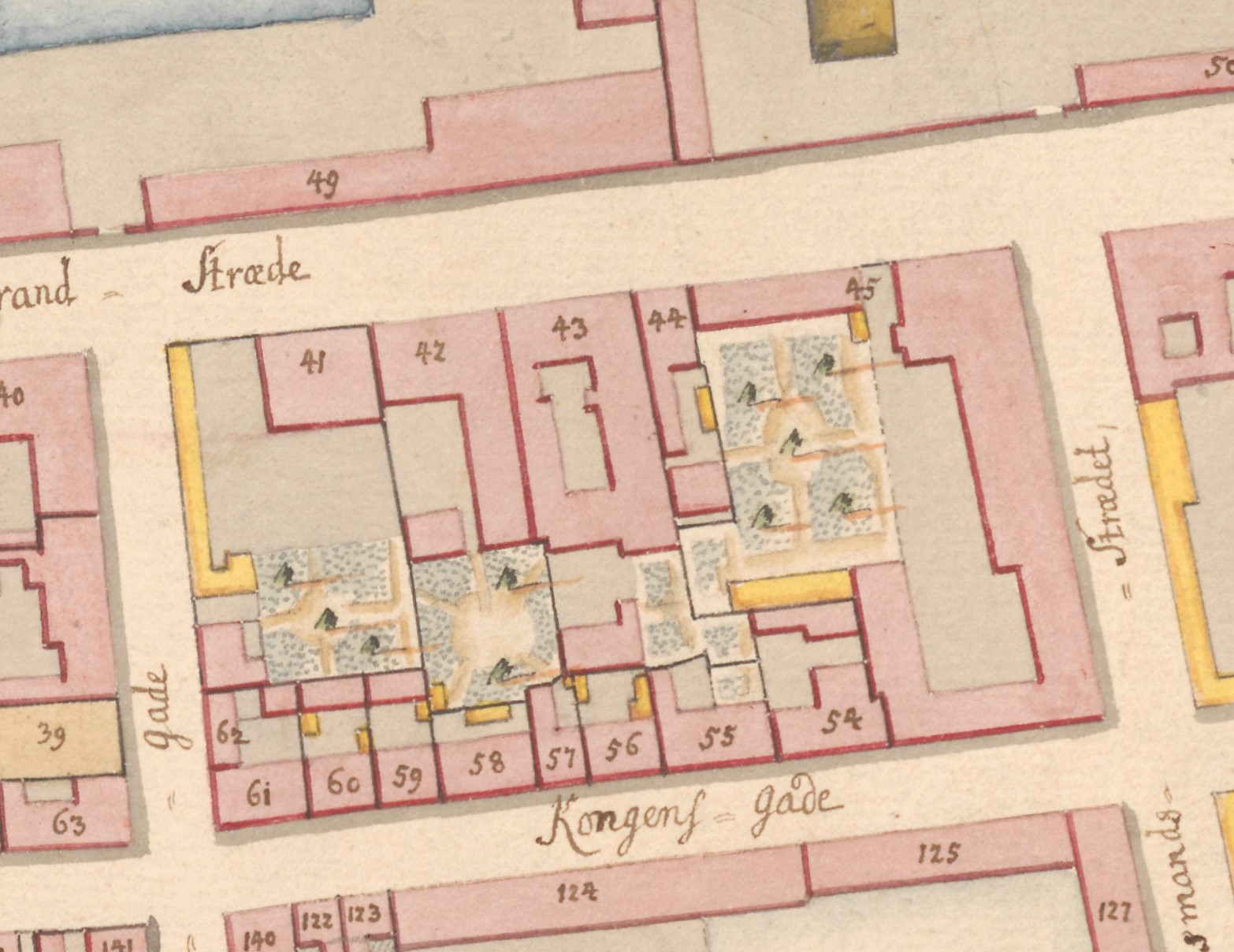
No. 45 seen on a detail from Christian Gedde's map of Christianshavn Quarter, 1757.

The new owner was Henrik Ocksen. In 1730, he was appointed as amtmand of Iceland and the Faroe Islands. He kept the property until his death in 1750.

In 1751, Oksen's heirs sold the Irgens House to merchant Peter Borre. His property was listed in the new cadastre of 1756 as No. 45 in Christianshavn Quarter.

In circa 1753, Borre partnered with Peter Fenger- as Borre & Fenger. His business partner resided in the Peter Fenger House at the other end of Strandgade. Their company Borre & Fenger owned a property facing Christianshavn Cabal (Overgaden Neden Vandet 51, later part of Wildersgade Barracks. Borre owned the adjacent warehouse (Overgaden Neden Vandet 49, later part of Wildersgade Barracks). In 1760, Borre & Fenger received a royal privilege to establish a sugar refinery but the plans were most likely not realized. Borre was instead appointed as manager of the country's newly monopolized tobacco industry in return for 12.5% of the government's incomes from the tobacco trade. The monopoly existed until 1778. Borre's daughter, Birgitte Kirstine Borre (1757-1809), married the merchant Charles August Selbye, a neighbor, on 26 November 1777.

In 1774–1779, Borre served as director of the Royal Greenland Trade Department. (Det grønlandske Handels- og Fiskefangstkompagni), Twice a year, Borre's property played host to the company's auctions. Vast quantities of whale oil (hvid hvaltran, brun tran, trekronertran etc), whale bards, dried fish (plat-fisk, klipfisk), lanolin, bird fethers, hides eiderdowns, whool, saltpeter, cured lamb meat and other products were sold from the premises.

In 1790, Borre sold the property to the Greenland Trade Department,.Hartvig Marcus Frich, who had succeeded Borre as director of the company, resided in the building at the time of the 1898 census. He lived there with his wife Dorothee Frisch (née Tutein), their two-year-old daughter Henriette Cauline Frisch, his 17-year-old niece Arengoth Sophie Føns, three maids, one male servant, a coachman and a concierge.

1788 saw the establishment of a commission tasked with investigating the economy of the Greenland Trade Department. It was subsequently decided to sell the Irgens House and relocate the company headquarters to a modest building at Grønlandske Handels Plads. Frisch would later biu a property on Gammeltorv. The Frisch House was constructed after the previous building on the site had been destroyed in the Copenhagen Fire of 1795.

=== Strandgade Artillery Barracks ===
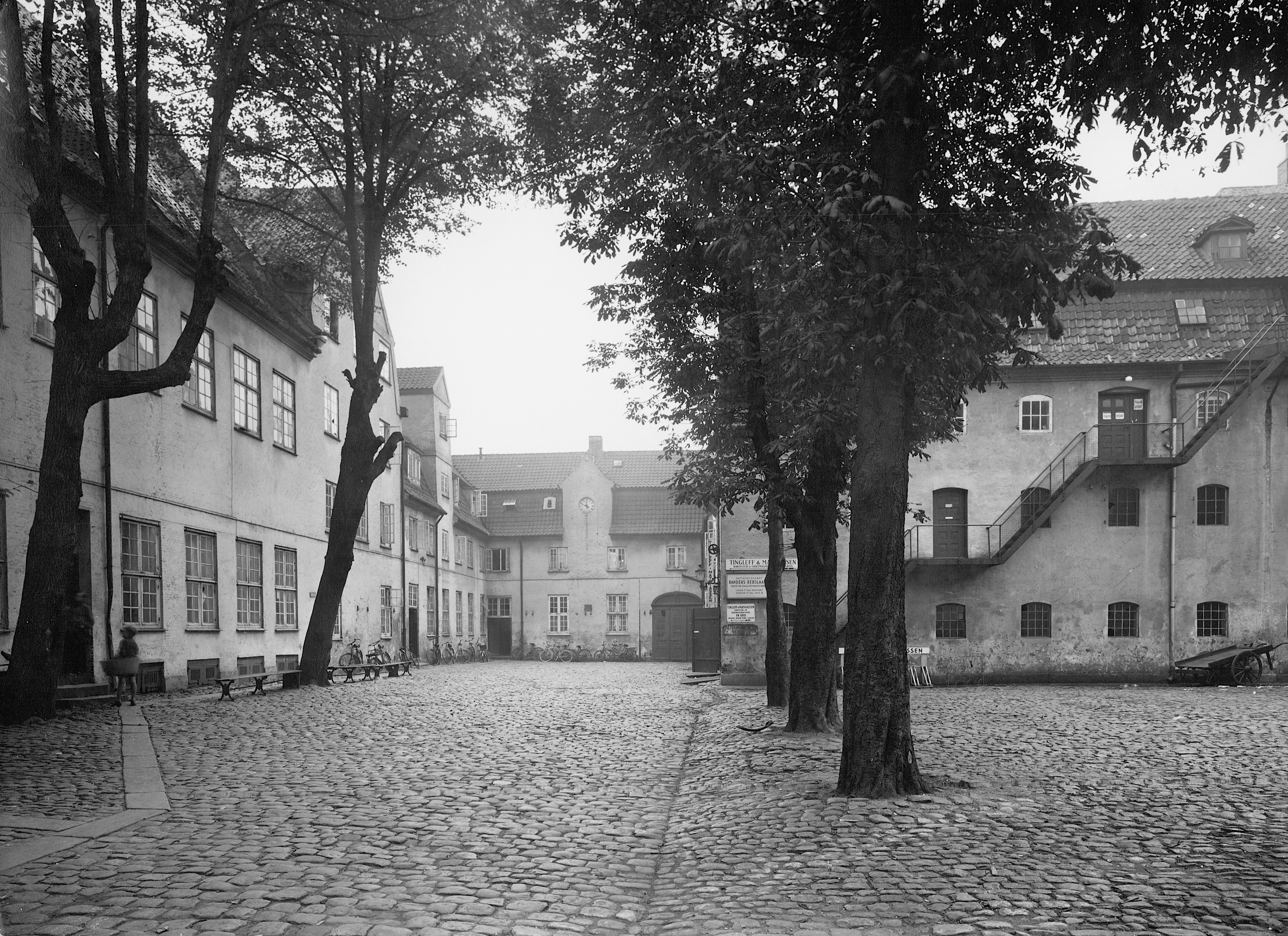
The yard of Strandgade 44.

The Irgens House was subsequently sold to General Commissariats and adapted for use as the Artillery Brigade barracks. On 13 February 1792, the army's engineering corps reported the conversion to be completed. Four artillery companies were subsequently transferred from their old premises at Kastellet to the new "Christianshavn Artillery Barracks"- Its first commandant was Major Salomon von Gedde. The larger Bådsmandsstræde Barracks opened on a nearby site adjacent to the Christianshavn Rampart in 1836 but the Old Artillery Barracks remained in use until 1923.

=== Later history ===
In 1924 the Ministry of Defence sold the property to the jurist and diplomat Georg Cohn. He kept it until his death in 1956- The property remained in the hands of his family until 1977. It was subsequently sold as condominiums.

== Architecture ==
The complex is bounded by Strandgade to the west, Bådsmandsstræde to the north and Wildersgade to the east, forming the northern part of a block which is completed by Sankt Annæ Gade to the south. The buildings seen today mainly date from 1700, although further alterations took place in 1779. They are built in brick with yellow dressing and tile roofs.

The complex surrounds a cobbled interior courtyard with large trees. A free-standing building in the courtyard dates from 1750.

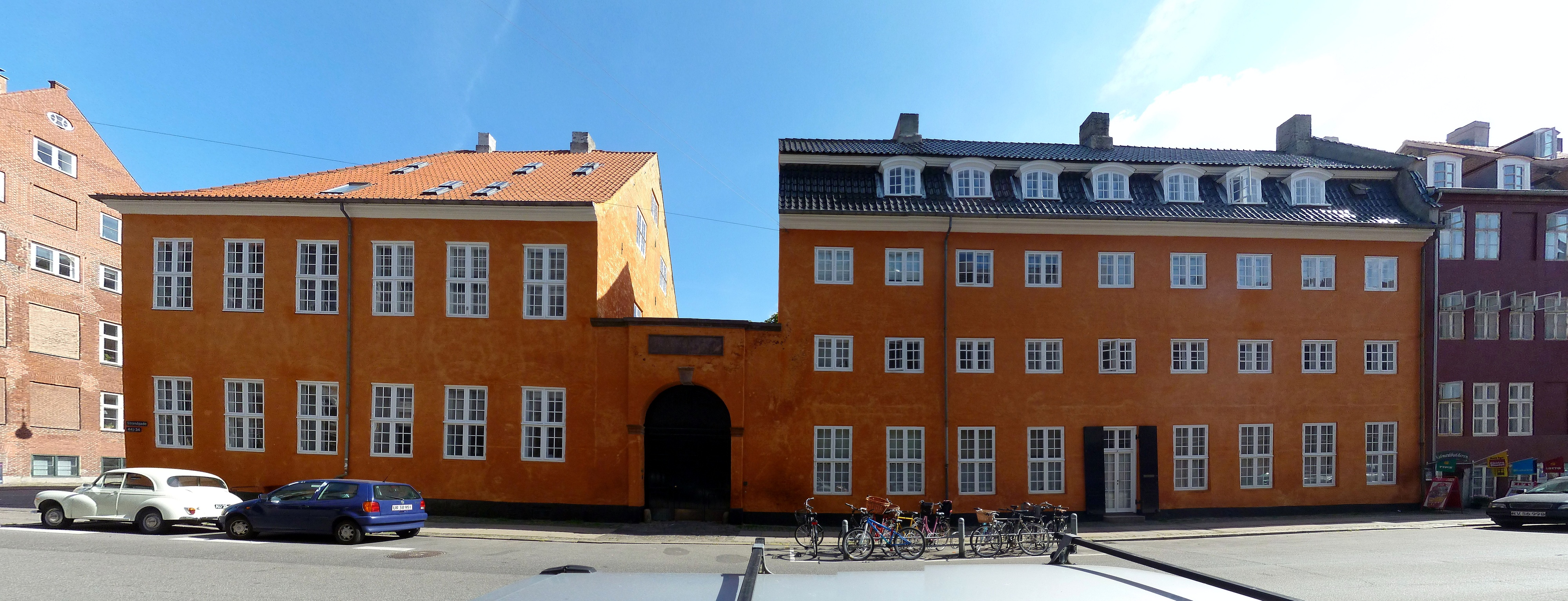
The facade on Strandgade

== List of owners ==
- (1620–23) Claus Condevin
- (1623–35) Johan Post
- (1635–64) Mathias Clausen and heirs
- (1664–80) Joachim Irgens and heirs
- (1680–99) Nicolai Jansen
- (1699–1751) Henrik Ochsen and heirs
- (1751–83) Peter Borre and estate
- (1783–92) The Kongelige Grønlandske, Islandske, Finmarkske og Færøiske Handel
- (1792–1924) The Kongelige Land Militair Etat Krigsministeriet, Forsvarsministeriet
- (1924–77) Georg Cohn and heirs
- (1977/1984–present) E/F Urgens Gård
