= Wildersgade =

Street in Copenhagen, Denmark

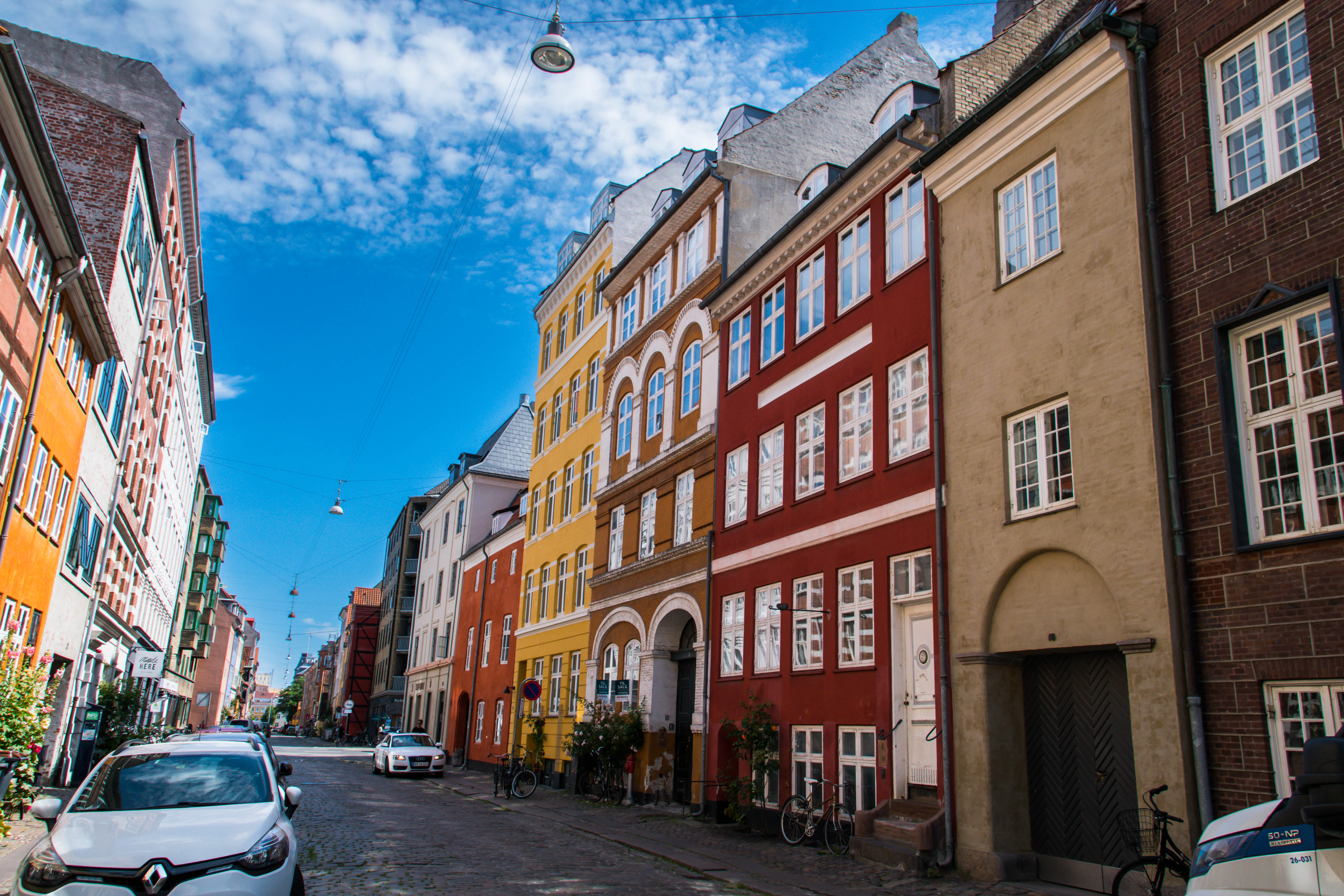
- Torvegade
- Length: 591 m (1,939 ft)
- Location: Christianshavn, Copenhagen, Denmark
- Postal code: 1408

Wildersgade is a street in the Christianshavn district of Copenhagen, Denmark. It runs along the length of the neighbourhood, parallel to Christianshavn Canal, one block to the east, from the Christiansbro development in the south(west) to Wilder's Canal in the north(east). The street is bisected by Torvegade, Christianshavn's principal thoroughfare, but is otherwise a quiet mainly residential street with cobbling and many old townhouses and storages from the 18th and 19th century.

== History ==
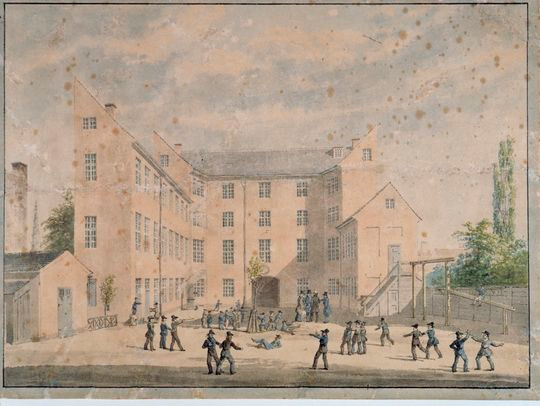
Borderdyd School's schoolyard in about 1845, painting by H. G. F. Holm

The history of Wildersgade dates back to the foundation of Christianshavn as an independent market town in 1617–22. The street was originally called Kongensgade (King's Street), complementing Dronningensgade (Queen's Street) and Prinsensgade (Prince's Street; now Prinsessegade, Princess Street) on the other side of the canal. The section to the north of Torvegade was known as Store Kongensgade (Great King's Street) while the section to the south of Torvegade was called Lille Kongensgade (Little King's Street). The current name was introduced in 1859 when the much larger street Ny Kongensgade (New King's Street) on the other side of the harbor took over the name Store Kongensgade). The rectory of Christian's Church was originally located at No. 5. In 1795, the building was taken over by a branch of Borgerdyd School which shortly thereafter was Borgerdyd School on Nørregade in the city centre. Its name was later changed to Vestre Borgerdyd School and it is now called Københavns Åbne Gymnasium. In 1890, the building in Wildersgade was acquired by Burmeister & Wain while the school relocated to a new building on Stockholmsgade in Østerbro.

== Notable buildings and residents ==
=== North of Torvegade ===
No. 60 is the former Wildersgade Barracks. The main building was built by Jørgen Henrich Rawert and Andreas Hallander in 1802. The long, one-storey building to the left is the barracks' former stables. The yellow building on the other side of the street is the rear side of the Irgens House complex which served as artillery barracks from 1789. Many other houses in the street are also listed. They consist mostly of townhouses and former warehouses. The large building at No. 70, on the corner of Cjristianshavn Canal and Wilder's Canal, is Princess Marie's Home for Old Seamen and Their Widows and also houses the Seamen's Association of 1856. The oldest part of the building is from 1874 while an extension dates from 1921.

The street is also home to a number of listed warehouses and townhouses. The warehouse at No. 51 was built in association with Niels Brock's House in Strandgade (No. 36 on the other side of the block. No. 41–43 is part of the Sigvart Grubbe House complex. No. 34, No. 36, No. 37, No. 38, No. 40, 42, 45, 48–50, No. 49, No. 52, No. 53 and No. 58 are also listed

=== South of Torvegade ===
The buildings at No. 9 and 10, which are connected by a two-storey skyway spans the street, were built for the B&W shipyard and are from 1925. No. 10 houses the one Michelin-starred restaurant Kadeau which mainly uses products from the island of Bornholm and has a sister restaurant in Aakirkeby. The large, neighbouring building (Overgaden Neden Vandet 9) is a former engine hall from the 1860s and was also built for B&W. It was adapted for use as an office building by Dissing ? Weitling in 1990. The two white buildings at the southern end of the street were built in 1998–2001 as part of Henning Larsen Architects¨Christiansbro masterplan for the redevelopment of the B&W site. They are called Løvens Hård and Enhjørningens Gård and were designed by Lauritz Vilhelmsen Arkitekter and Arkitema.

Listed buildings along this southern portion of the street includes the narrow townhouses at No. 15–19.

== Cultural references ==
In the 2009 film Applause Café Eiffel (Wildersgade 58) is the place where Thea Barfoed (Paprika Steen) goes to get drunk. Another bar, Fingerbøllet (Wildersgade 39), was used as a location in Anders Thomas Jensen's Blinkende Lygter (2000) and Nikolaj Arcel's Kongekabale (2004) as well as in the DR television series Taxa. Nikolaj og Julie and Livvagterne

== Image gallery ==
The skyway at No. 10

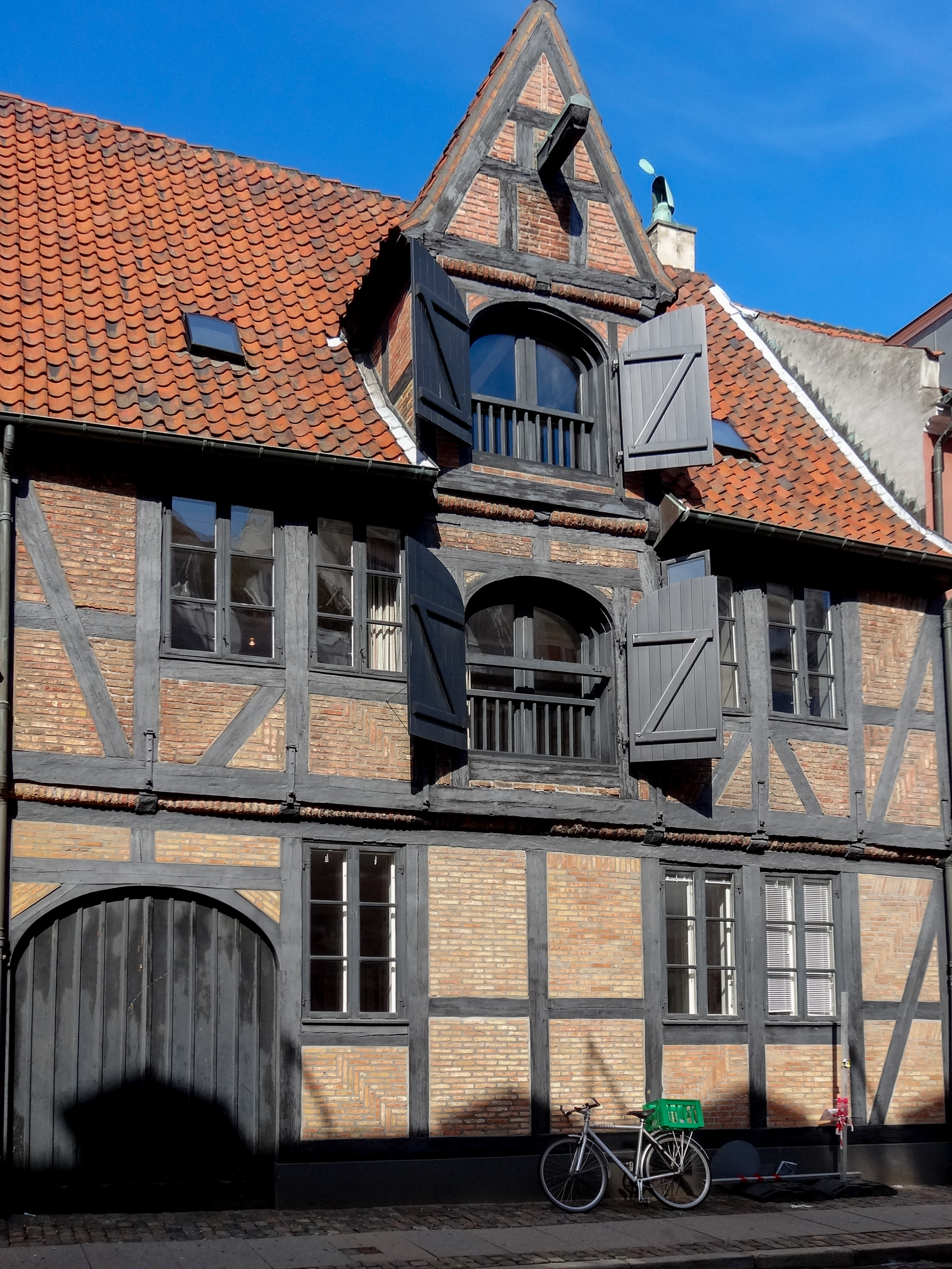
Wildersgade 41

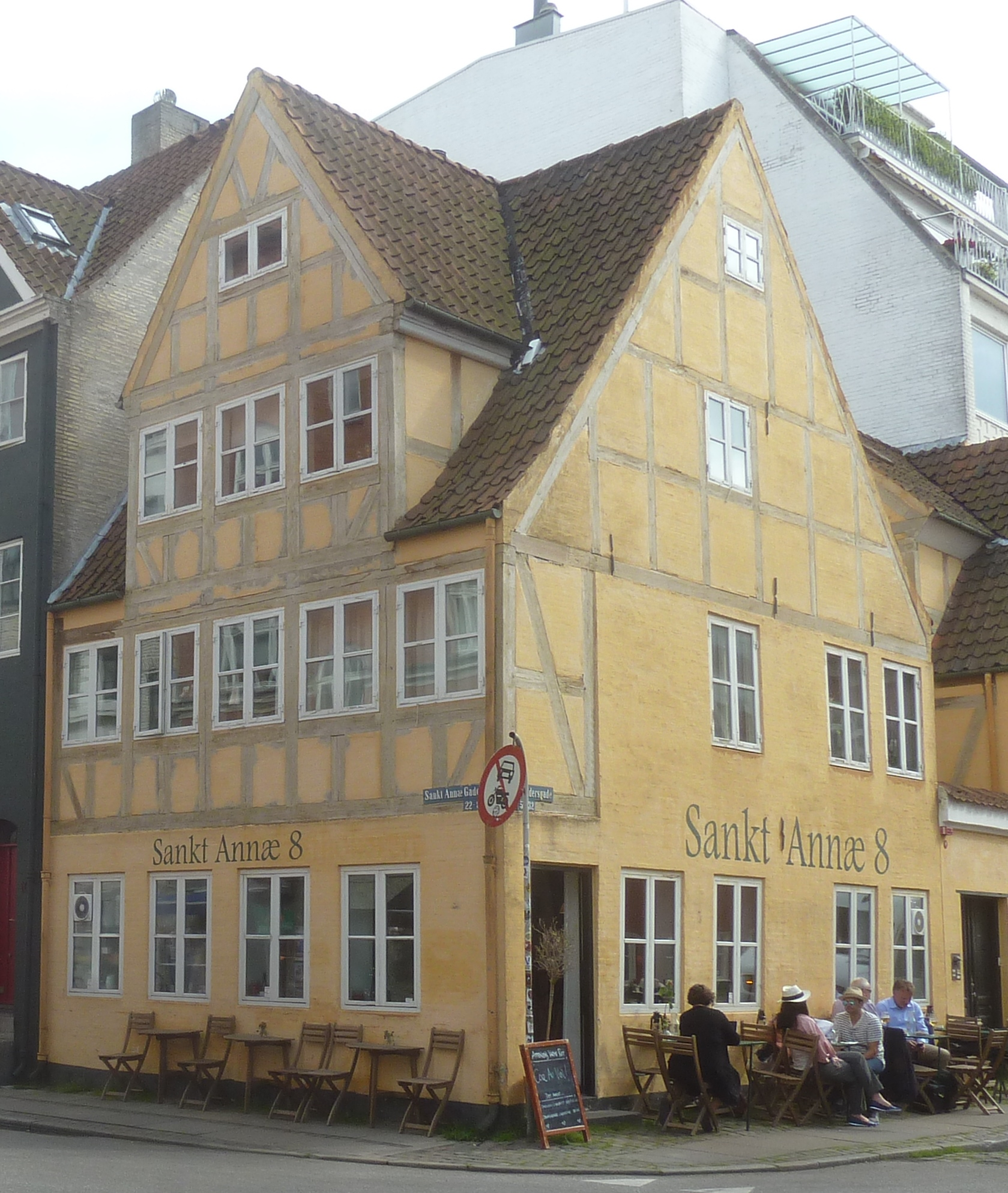
No. 52

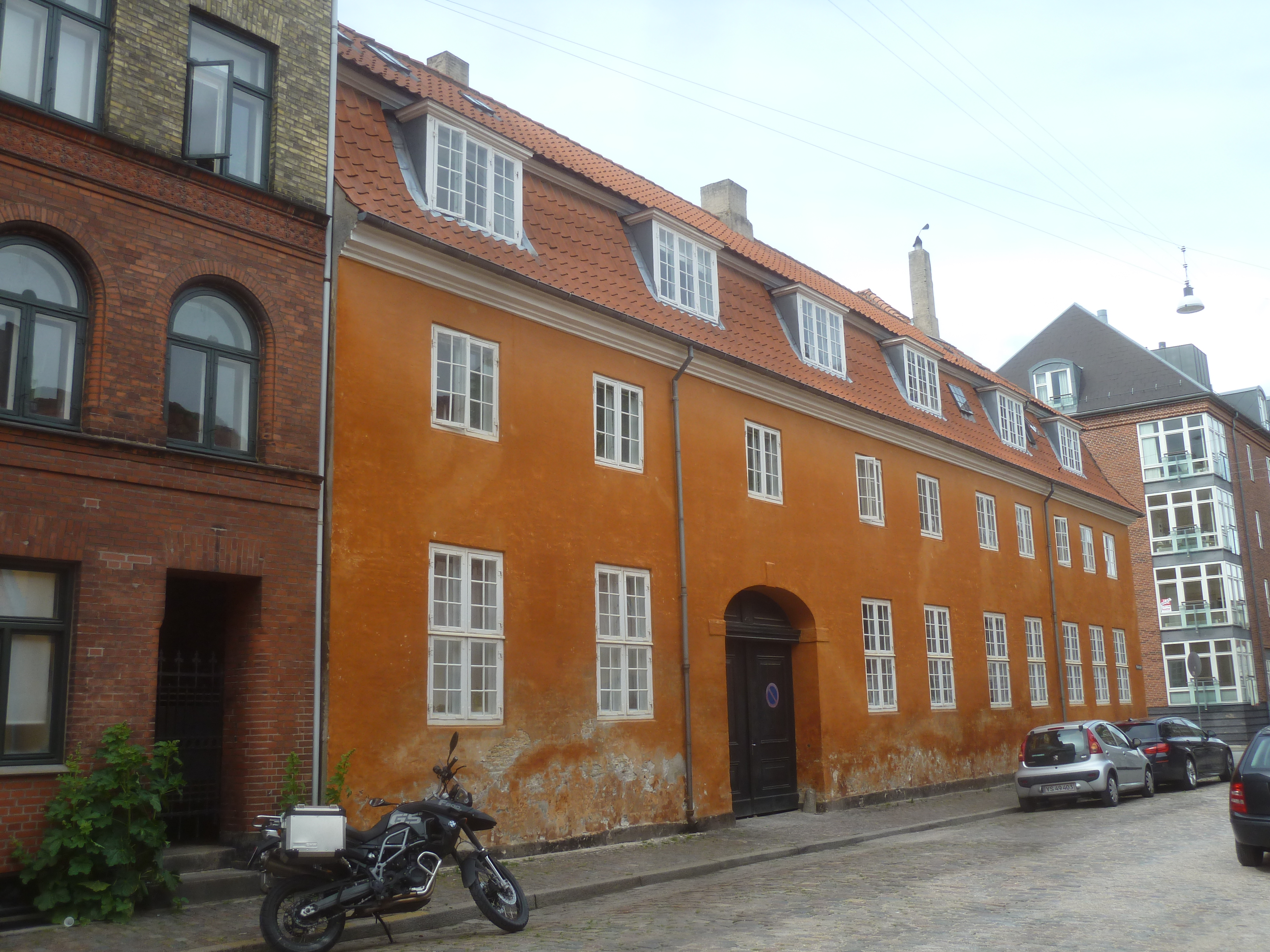
Irgens House

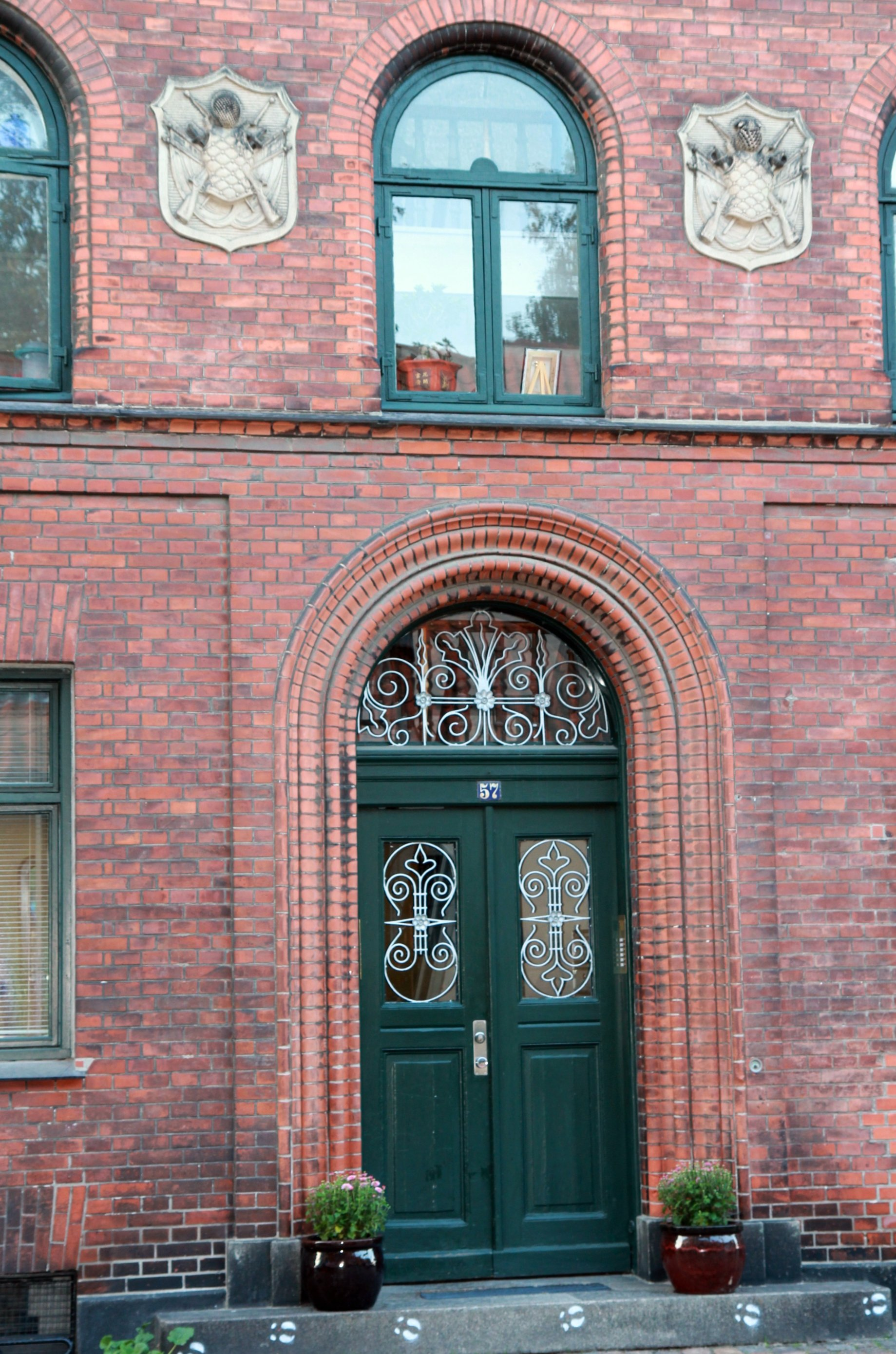
Door of No. 78

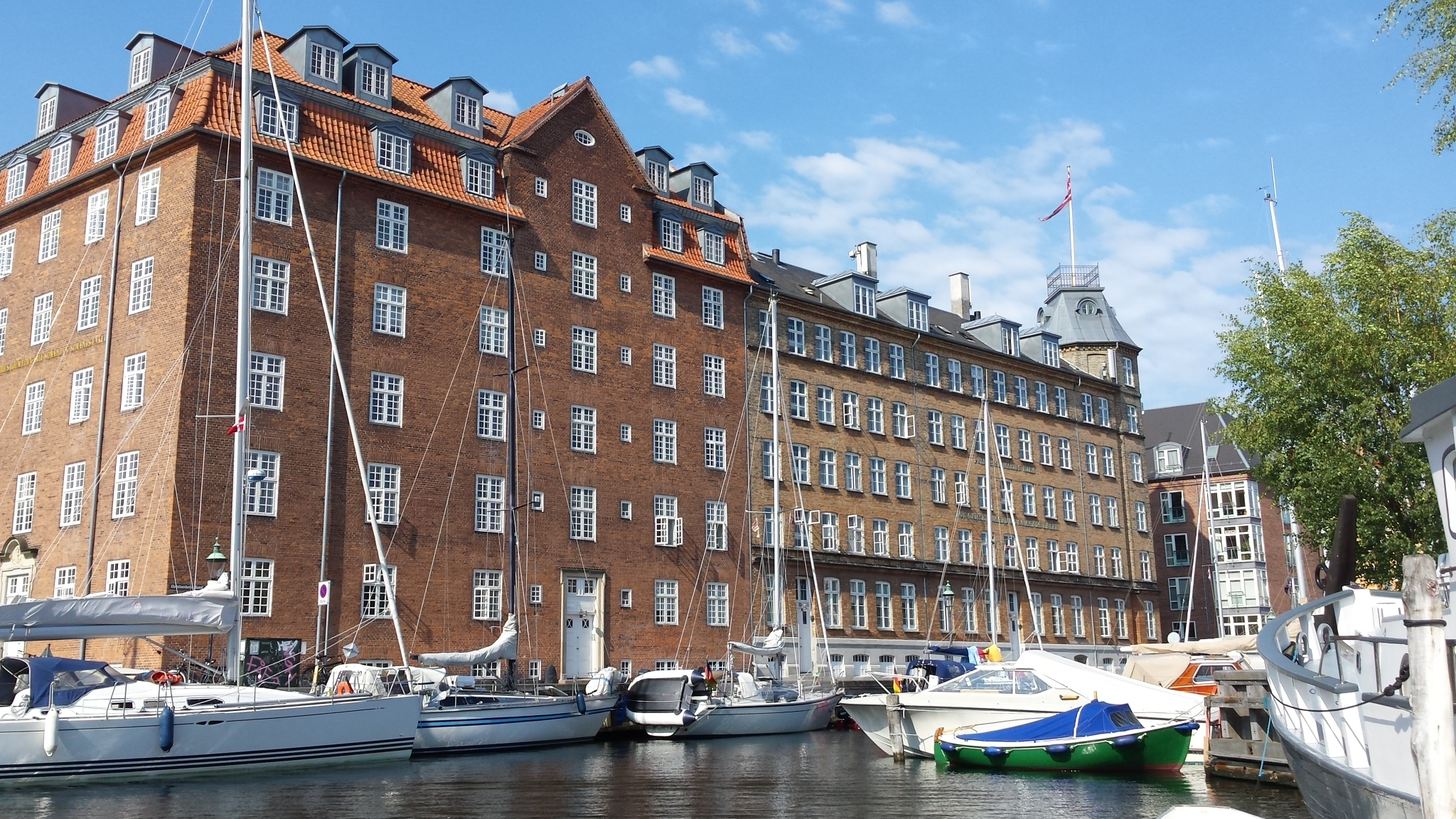
Princess Marie's Home for Seamen and Seamen's Windows
