= Peter Fenger (merchant) =

Danish merchant

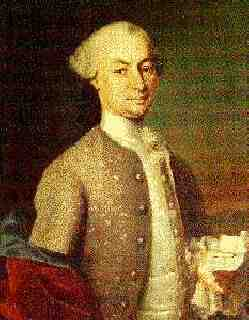
- Born: 23 October 1719; Lübeck, Schleswig-Holstein
- Died: 24 December 1774 (aged 55); Copenhagen, Denmark
- Occupations: Merchant and shipowner

Peter Fenger (23 October 1719 – 24 December 1774) was a Danish merchant.

== Early life and education ==
Fenger was born in Lübeck, the son of skipper Peter Fenger (1688–1737) and Magdalene Margrethe Seeländer (1692–1778). He came to Copenhagen in an early age where he became an apprentice in Johan Friederich Wewer's trading house. He stayed there for 14 years.

== Career ==
In 1752, Fenger established his own trading house in Christianshavn. In spite of his lack of experience as a company trader, he was hired by the Danish Asiatic Company as 1st supercargo on board the Dronning Juliana Maria on her expedition to Canton in 1753, Back in Copenhagen, in 1755, he began a partnership with Peter Borre under the name Borre & Fenger. The company traded in a wide array of products, including salt, flax, hemp and coal, spices, sugar and other colonial goods. The company was based in the Irgens House and constructed a building at Overgaden neden Vandet 51 in 1761–1762.

Fenger and Borre were granted a royal license to establish a sugar refinery in 1760 but do not seem to have used it. Fenger did, however, establish a large soap factory. He became a member of the merchants' Council of Elders and was also a member of the Council of 32 Men from 1772.

== Personal life and death ==
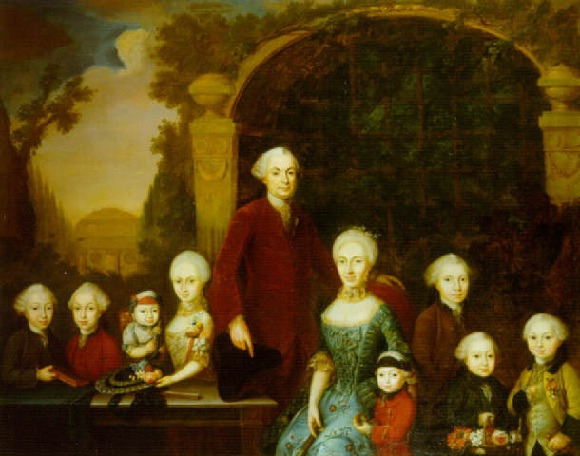
The Fenger family portrait. painted by Ulrich Ferdinand Beenfeldt in c. 1770 (National Museum of Denmark).

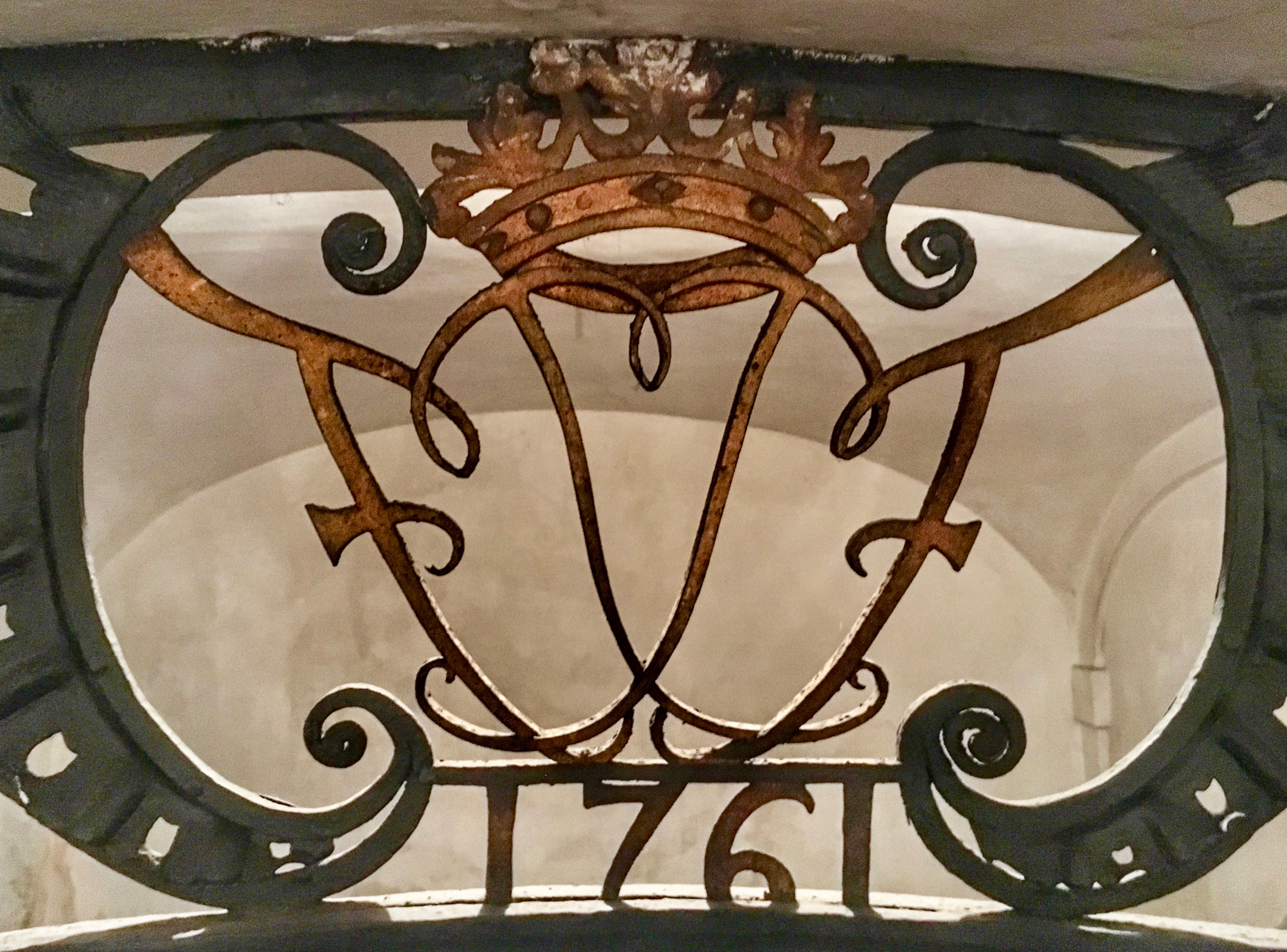
Fenger's monogram in Christian's Church, Copenhagen.

Fenger married Else Brock (1737–1811), the daughter of merchant Rasmus Brock (1695–1752) and Marie Kirstine Andersdatter Knudsen (1710–1745) and thus the sister of merchant Niels Broch, on 17 June 1758 in the Church of Our Saviour, Copenhagen. They had ten children.

Fenger died on 24 December 1774 and was buried in Frederick's German Church. The company was then continued by his widow with great skill.

== See also ==
- Christian August Broberg
