= Dronningensgade =

Street in Copenhagen, Denmark

Coordinates: 55.6724°N 12.5926°E

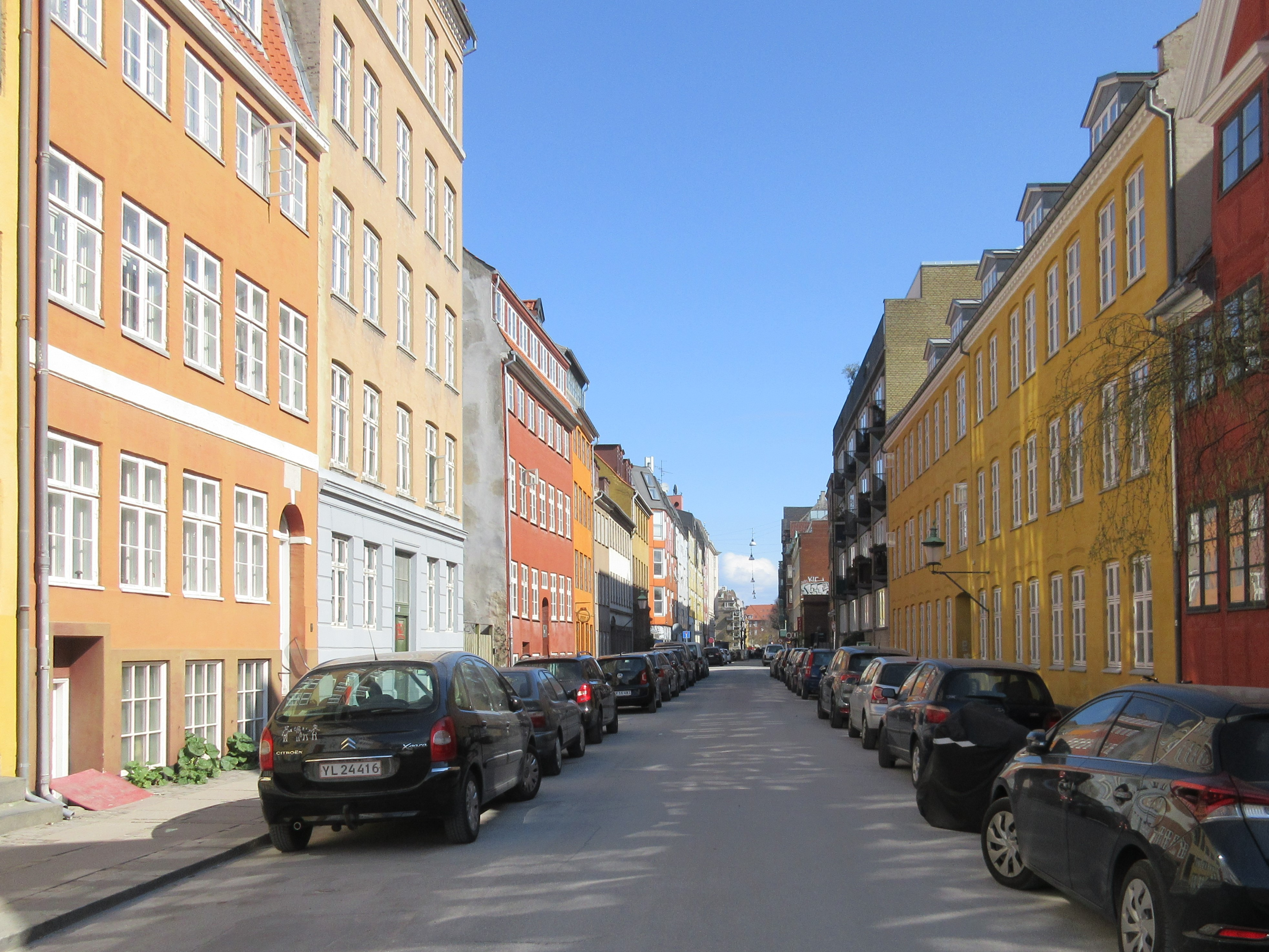
Looking north-east along Dronningensgade

Dronningensgade is a street in the Christianshavn district of Copenhagen, Denmark, running parallel to Christianshavn Canal one block to the east, from Christianshavn Rampart in the south to Bådsmandsstræde in the north.

== History ==
The history of the street dates back to the foundation of Christianshavn in the early 17th century. The name originally matched that of Kongensgade on the other side of Christianshavn Canal but that street was renamed Wildersgade when Christianshavn was merged with Copenhagen later in the century.

The Danish Film Foundation acquired No. 3 in 1965. The building was used for administration, Denmark's first film school and museum activities. This lasted until the opening of the Danish Film Institute in Gothersgade.

== Buildings ==
No. 3 was built in 1848 and was a combined forge and iron foundry. The chimney was added in 1860 and extended in 1861. In 1900, the ground floor was converted into a shop while the first floor became a residence.

No. 67 was built in 1778 as a school for poor children. The roof was adapted into a Mansard roof in 1898. In 1913, it was converted into a girls' school, Christianshavns Døttreskole (English: Christianshavn Daughters' School).

No. 75–77 is the former premises of Jensen & Møller, a trading company. Built in 1913 to designs by Heinrich Hansen, the facade still advertises some of the products sold: "Sugar goods, biscuits, confecture".

== Gallery ==
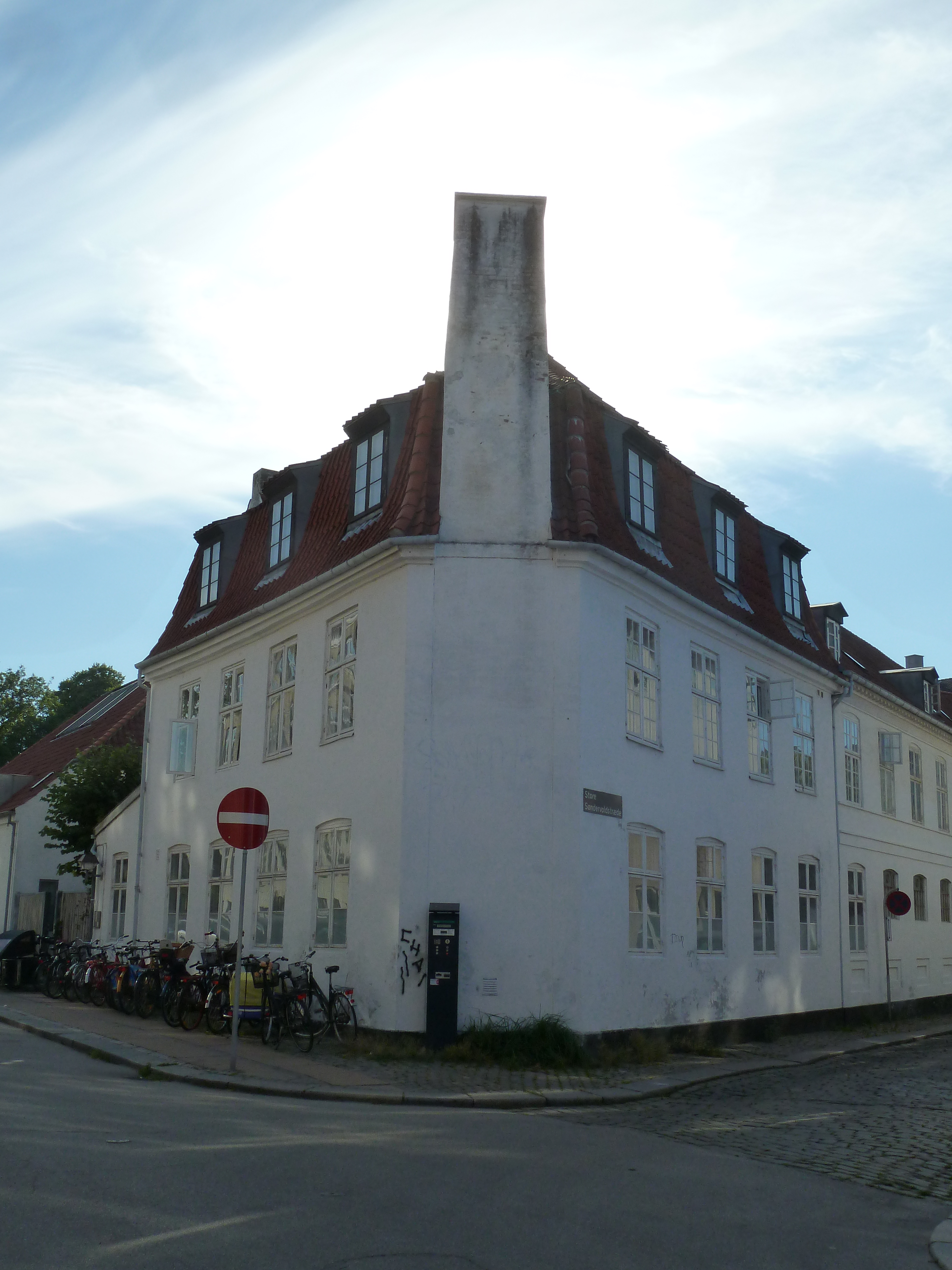
The former iron foundry at No. 3

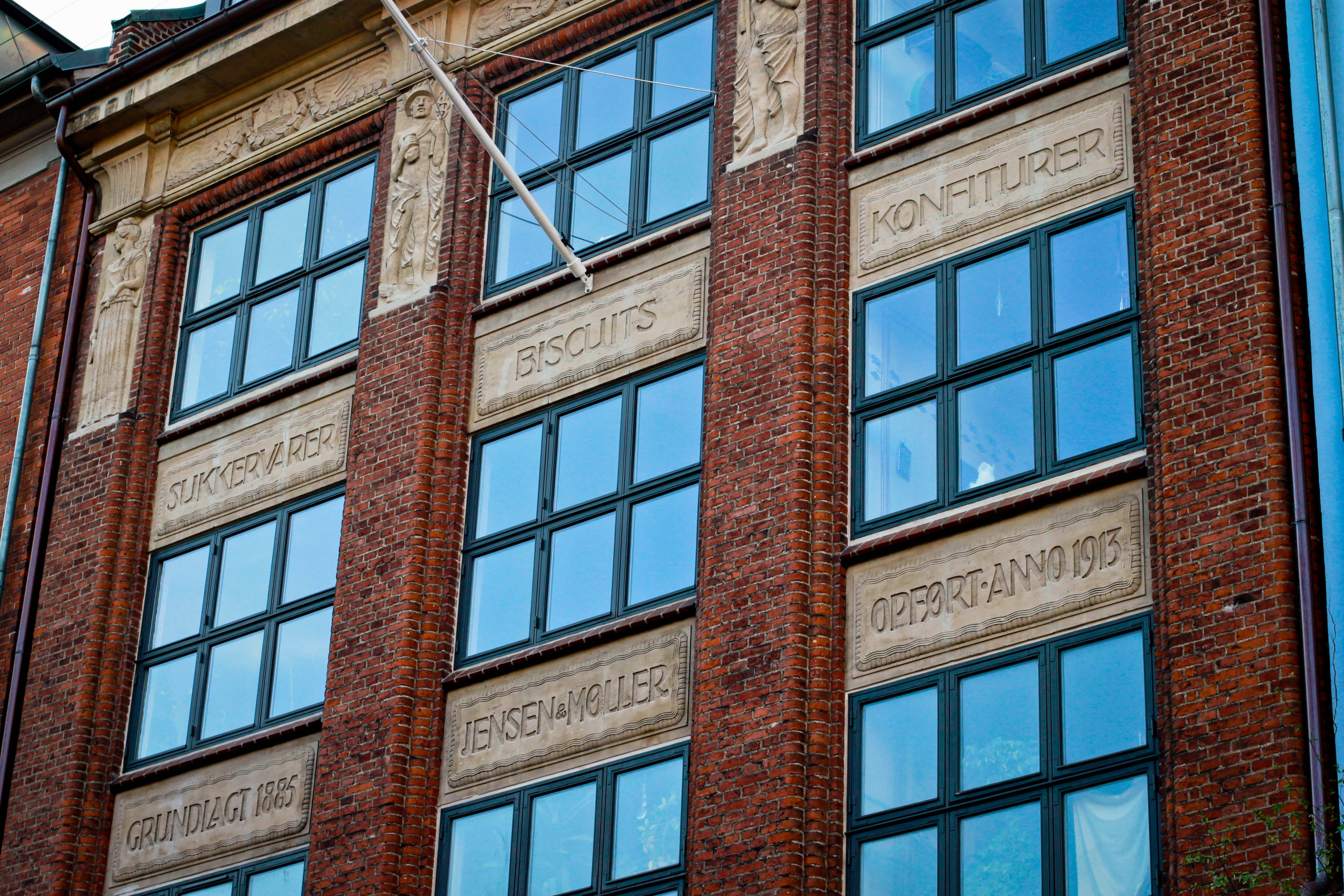
No. 77:Facade detail

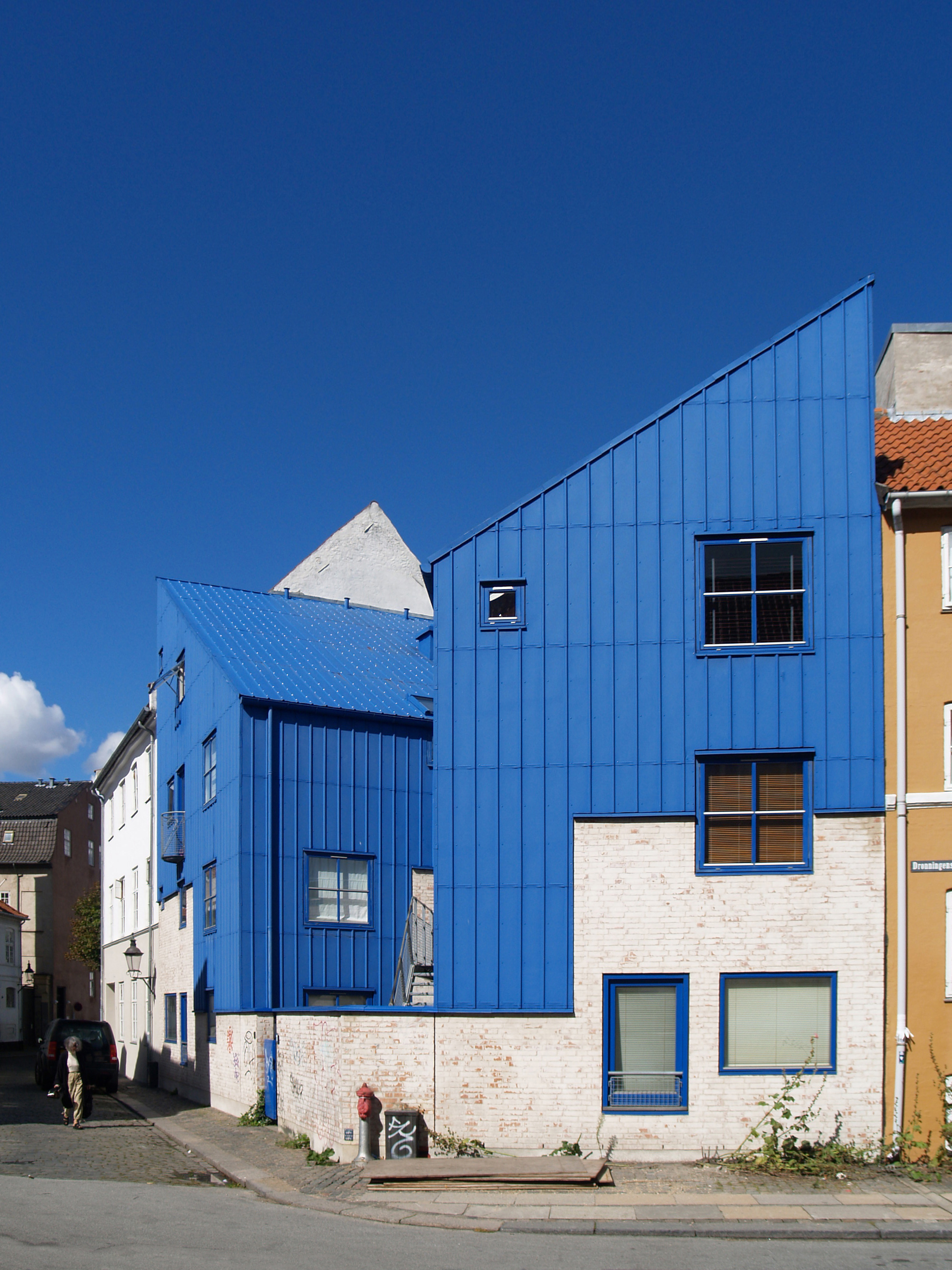
The Blue Corner: Social housing by Tegnestuen Vandkunsten

== See also ==
- Sankt Annæ Gade
