= Andreas Bjørn =

Danish merchant, shipbuilder and ship owner (1703–1750)

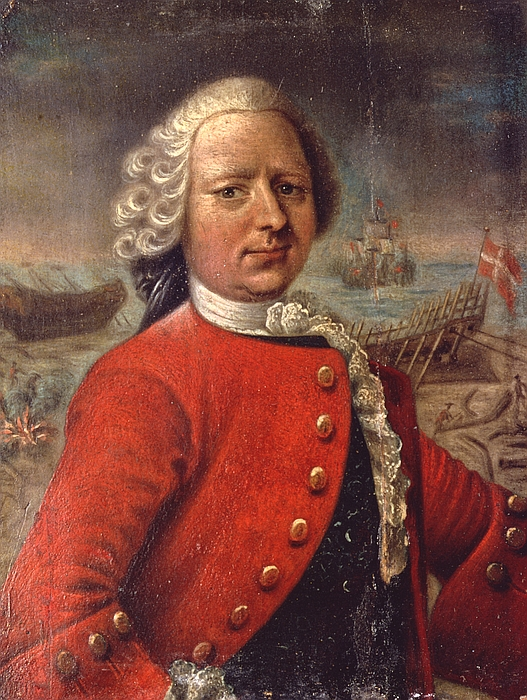
- Andreas Bjørn painted shortly before his death by A. Briinniche
- Born: 28 October 1703; Skælskør, Denmark
- Died: 27 January 1750 (aged 46); Copenhagen, Denmark
- Occupations: Industrialist, merchant, ship owner, ship builder
- Awards: Grand Cross of the Dannebrog

Andreas Bjørn (28 October 1703 – 27 January 1750) was a Danish merchant, shipbuilder and ship owner.

== Early life ==
Andreas Bjørn was born (as Anders Bjørn, name later changed to Andreas Bjørn) in Skælskør to Mads Andersen Bjørn and Karen Pedersdatter. His father was a peasant. He came to Copenhagen in an early age. In 1730, he took citizenship as a wholesaler. He initially worked in the lucrative timber trade. His lumberyard was located at the customs house (north of present-day Larsens Plads. From 1731 he supplied the Royal Danish Navy with provisions, cannons and large quantities of timber. From 1739, he also supplied the Royal Danish Army with cannons.

== Ship building ==
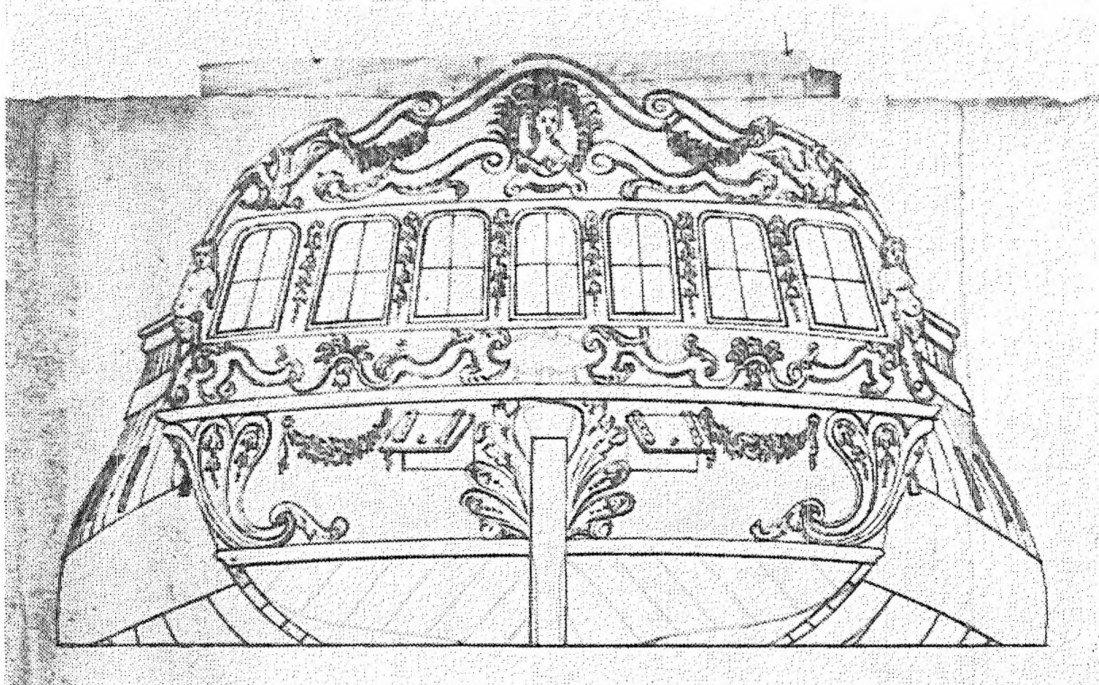
Construction drawing for the frigate Enigheden, the first ship built at Bjørn's shipyard.

In 1732, Bjørn bought Grønnegård Harbour at the southern tip of Christianshavn. He mainly used the area as a lumberyard. In the same year, he also bought Niels Alsing's lumberyard at the other end of Strandgade. The property reached all the way from Strandgade to Christianshavn Canal and was partly lined with a row of wooden warehouses along the street. He demolished most of the buildings and constructed a house for his own use (now known as the Andreas Bjørn House) at the corner of Strandgade and Bådsmandsstræde in 1734. He also constructed a number of warehouses and workshops on the land. In 1733, he was permission to establish a dockyard on reclaimed land to the north of his new property. Separated from the rest of Christianshavn by a branch of Christianshavn Canal (now Wilders Kanal), his dockyard became known as Bjørnsholm (Bjørn's Isle). Approximately 50 ships were built at the dockyard. Some of them were used by himself in oversea trade, while others were commissions from other trading houses or the government.

=== Ships built at Andreas Bjørn's Dockyard ===
The following ships were built by Andreas Bjørn. Most of them were built at Bjørnsholm but some of them were built in other locations.The place of construction of the individual ships is not known.

Year	Name	Type	Sgipbuilder	Comments
1741	Enigheden	Frigate		
1741	Københavns Slot	Frigate		Built for the navy.
1742	Dokken	Frigate		Commissioned by the navy bit shortly thereafter handed over to the Danish Asiatic Company.
1743	København	Frigate	Poul Brock	Built for Andfreas Bjørn's own use. In 1744, he sold it to the Danish Asiatic Company.
1743	Fortuna	Frigate	Poul Brock	Built for Andfreas Bjørn's own use. In 1748, he sold it to the General Trading Company..
1743	Fortuna	Galliot		Built for the nacy (decommissioned in 1747).
1743	Neptunus	Galliot		Built for the nacy. (decommissioned in 1852).
1743	Læsø	Galliot		Built for the nacy.
1744	Jonfru Birgitte	Galliot	Jacob Rasmussen Lund	Owned by Jens Gregersen Klitgaard.
1744	Christiansborg	Frigate		In 1844, Christiansborg was sold to the Danish East Asiatic Company and renamed Trankebar.
1744	Dortuna			Sold to the king for 7m000 Danish rigsdaler.
1745	Københavns Slot	Frigate		Used in the Triangle Trade. In April 1769, it was sold in auction to Andreas Bodenhoff.
1745	Rigernes Ønske	Frigate		Sold to the General Trading Company in 1748.
1745	Postillonen	Frigate		
1745	Jægerspris	Frigate		Andreas Bjørn.
1747	Jægersborg	Frigate	Andreas Thuresen	Danish West India Company.
1747	Prinsesse Sophia Magdelena	Frigate	Poul Brock	Danish West India Company.
1747	Emanuel	Galliot	Jakob Rasmussen Lund	Jens Larsen and Partners
1747	Svanholm	Hækbåden	Jens Sørensen	Andreas Bjørn and Partners
1747	Sorgenfri	Frigate		Vest.-Guin. Komp.
1747	Frederiksborg Slot	Brigantine	Poul Brock	
1748	Fredensborg			
1748	Fredensborg	Frigate	Poul Brock	Andreas Bjørn and Partners
1748	Landets Ønske	Frigate		The General Trading Company.
1748	Frydenlund	Hæk		
1749	Prinsesse Wilhelmine Caroline			
1749	Mercurius	Hukkert		
1749	Hertuginden af Helburghausen			
1749	Frederikshaab			The General Trading Company.
1749	Frederiksberg	Hukkert		
1749	Jubelfesten	Hukkert		

== Oversea trade ==
Bjørn participated widely in overseas trade, especially with the Danish West Indies. In 1747, together with Ulrik Frederik Suhm (1686-1758) and Frederik Holmsted (1683–1758), he founded the General Trading Company which mainly traded with Iceland, Finnmark and later Greenland. The company took over the northernmost part of Bjørnsholm.

== Other pursuits ==
In 1747 the Royal Copenhagen Shooting Society moved their activities to a corner of Bjørnsholm. When Frederick V became a member later that same year, Bjørn arranged a large celebration at his own expense. The king, in return, appointed him as Royal Agent. In 1748, Bjørn was appointed as one of the directors of the new Royal Danish Theatre.

== Legacy ==
Andreas Bjørn's site at Christianshavn is now known as Wilders Plads, Krøyers Plads and Grønlandske Handels Plads after later owners. The old main building and a half-timbered workshop of his shipyard is still found at Wilders Plads. The Andreas Bjørn House at Strandgade 46 is also a heritage listed building. Andreas Bjørns Gade, also in Christianshavn, is named after him.

== See also ==
- Andreas Bodenhoff
