= Wilders Plads =

Waterfront in Copenhagen, Denmark

Coordinates: 55°40′32″N 12°35′39″E

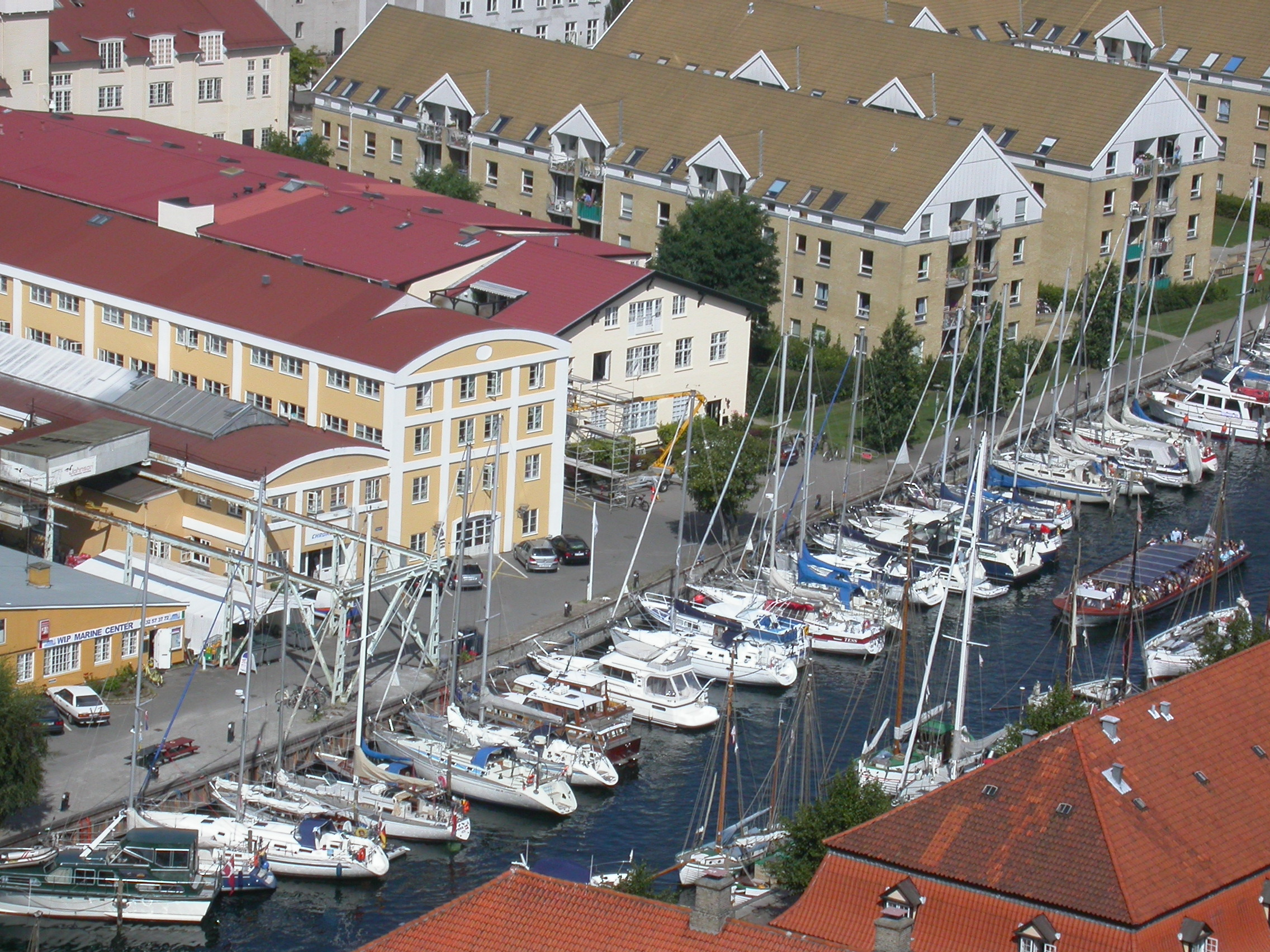
Surviving B & W buildings and The Yellow Envy seen from the top of Church of Our Saviour

Wilders Plads is a waterfront area located just north of Wilders Kanal, a branch of Christianshavns Kanal, in the north-western corner of the Christianshavn neighbourhood of Copenhagen, Denmark. The area is bounded by Christianshavn Canal to the east and Krøyers Plads to the north.

== Andreas Bjørn's shipyard ==
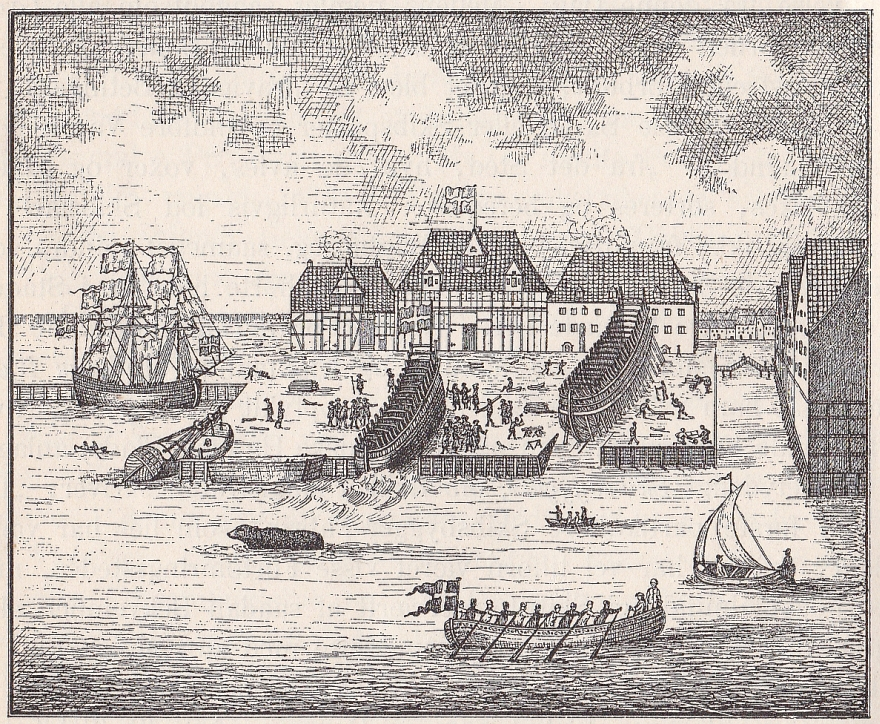
Andreas Bjørn's isle

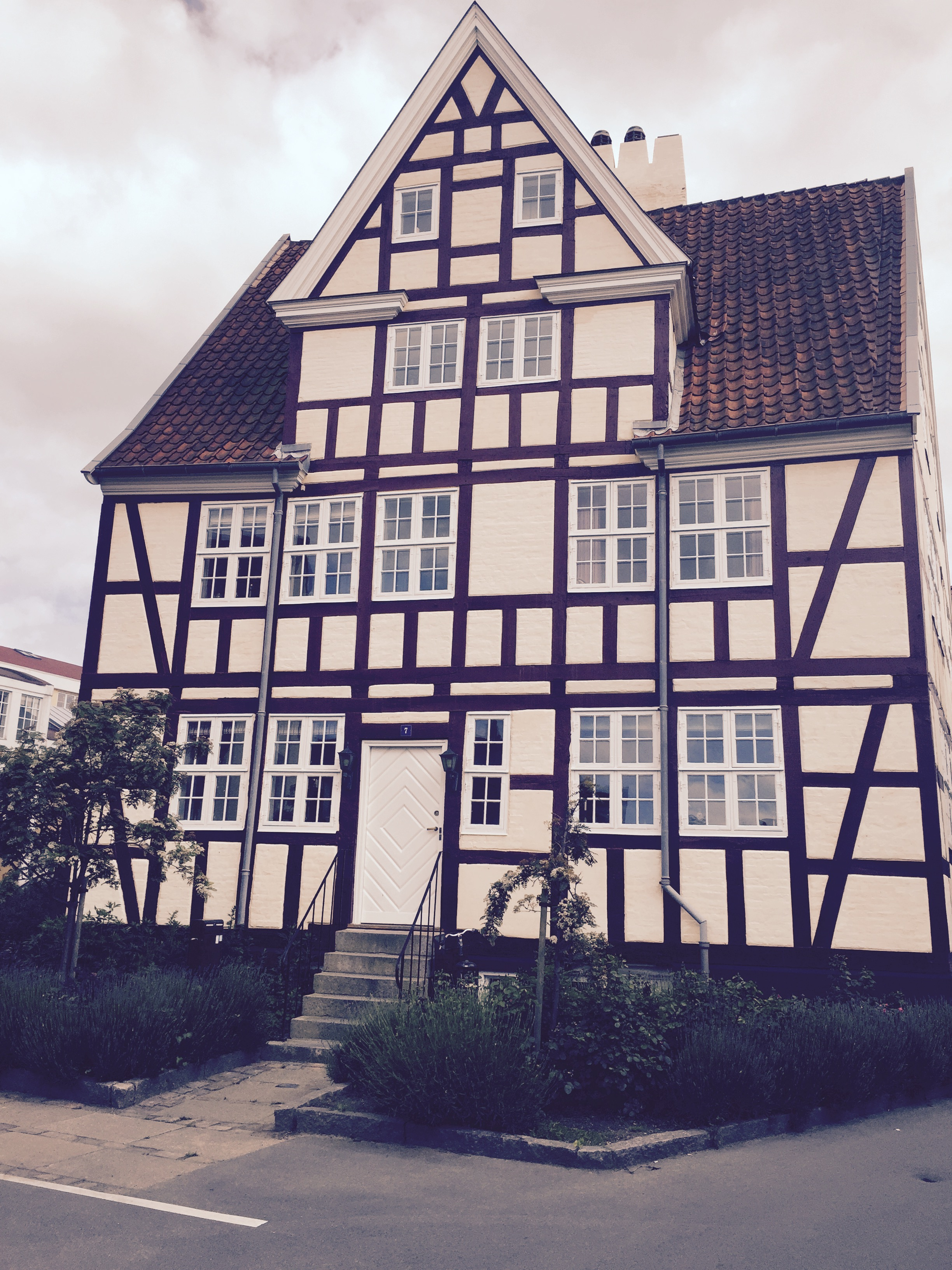
The old, half-timbered workshop building

The area now known as Wilders Plads was in the beginning of the 18th century still merely a marshy area north of Christianshavn. In 1735, Andreas Bjørn, obtained permission from King Christian VI to reclaim the area to establish a shipyard in the grounds. It managed to launch 59 ships before his death in 1750, including the naval ship Copenhagen Castle (Kjøbenhavns Slot) with 44 canons.

The oldest building in the area is the half-timbered building at Wilders Plads 10 which was built by Andreas Bjørn in 1736 as housing for workers at his shipyard and workshops for sailmakers. It

52 Strandgade, probably from about 1740, is the former main building of the shipyard. It was originally also used as housing for the most senior employees.

== Carl and Lars Wilder ==
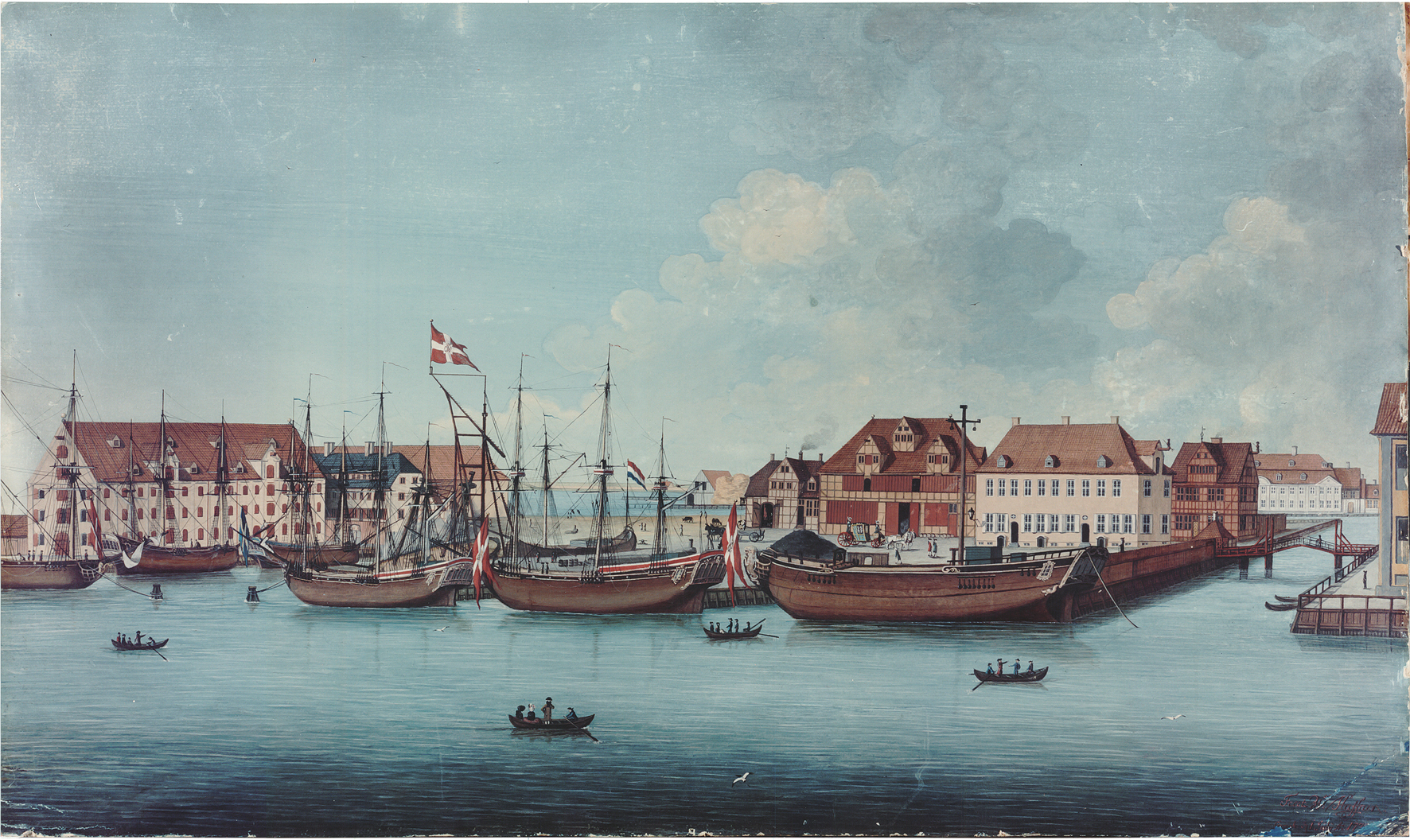
Wilders Plads with Wilder Warehouse seen from Bremerholm in 1776

In 1762, it was acquired by Carl Wilder who had made a fortune as a broker and merchant. He added a nail factory to the site before his death in 1764. His son, Lars Wilder, continued running the shipyard until his own death. He died unmarried and left his considerable fortune to the poor.

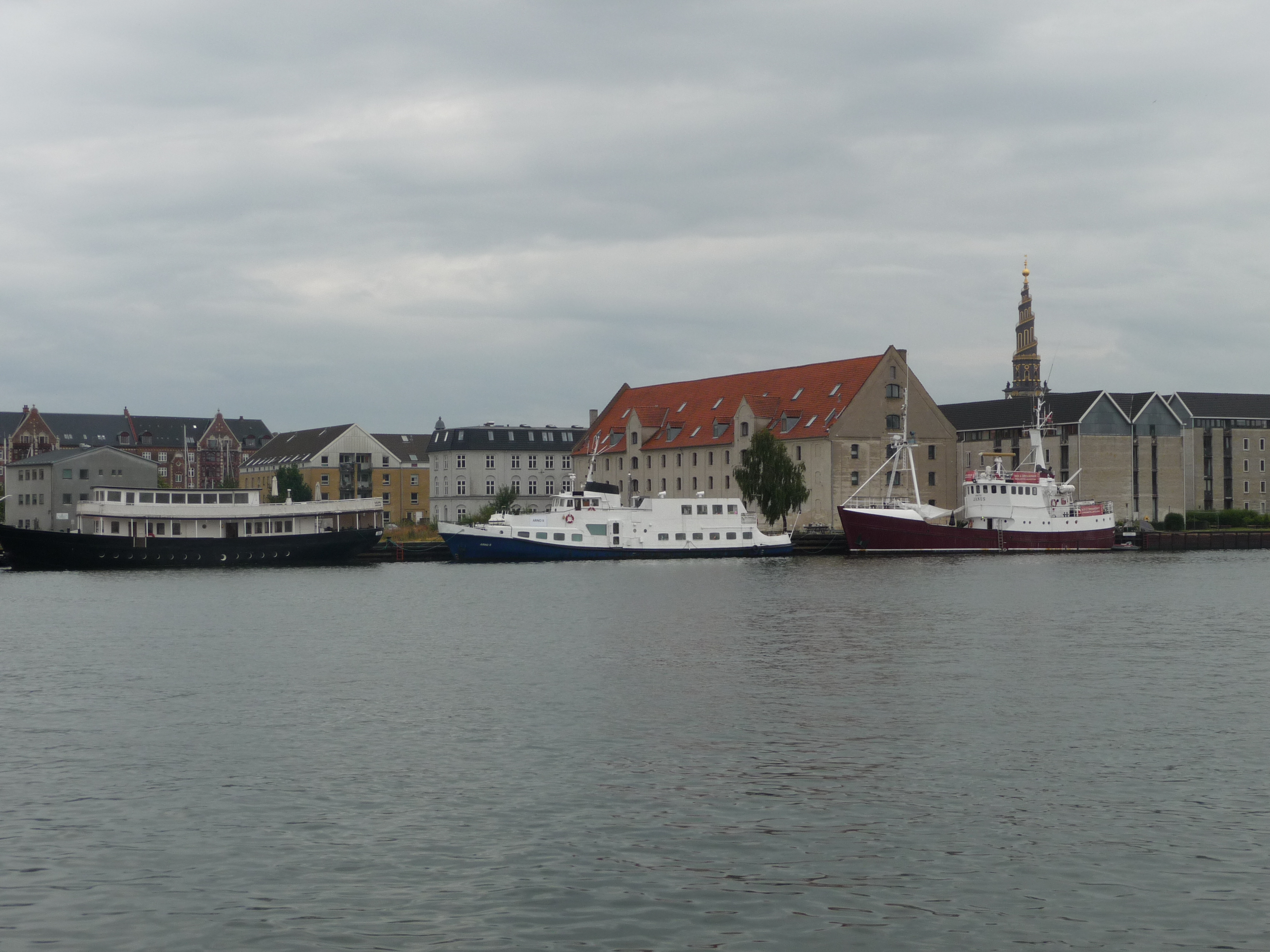
The Wilder Warehouse seen from the harbor

The so-called Wilder Warehouse (Danish: Wilders Pakhus) today marks the area's northern boundary with Krøyers Plads. It was built for Carl Wilder by Johan Christian Conradi in 1873.

== Jacob Holm and B & W ==
In 1814, Wilders Plads was acquired by Jacob Holm. He was a successful grocer and industrialist who was now moving into ship building, founding his own shipyard in the grounds.

The northern part of the island was sold to Royal Greenland Trade Department in the late 19th century and Burmeister & Wain took over Jacob Holm's shipyard in 1898. The company had most of its facilities in the southern part of Christianshavn, in the area now known as Christiansbro, but established a branch at Wilders Plads.

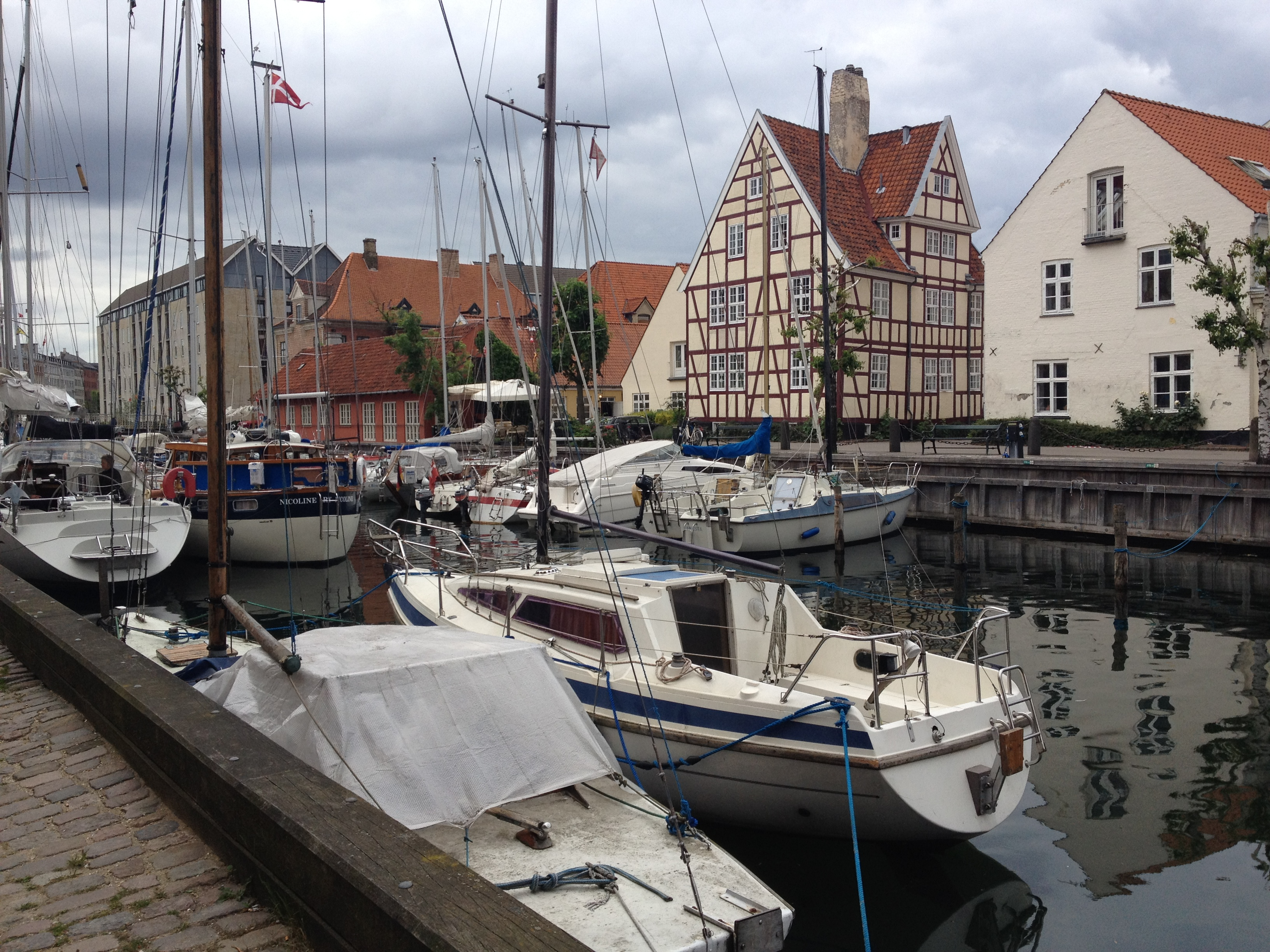
The White Cut to the left and the Sailmakers' House to the left viewed across Wilders Kanal

== Social housing ==
Part of the area was redeveloped as social housing in the 1970s and 80s. The first estate was built from 1975 to 1978 and faces the main harbour. It is popularly known as Det Gvide Snit (#The White Cut). A second housing estate facing the canal was completed in 1985. It is known as Den Gule Misundelse' ("Yellow Envy") and replaced some of Burmeister & Wain's old buildings. Both housing estates are administrated by Lejerbo.

== See also ==
- Larsens Plads
