= Sankt Annæ Gade =

Street in the Christianshavn district of Copenhagen, Denmark

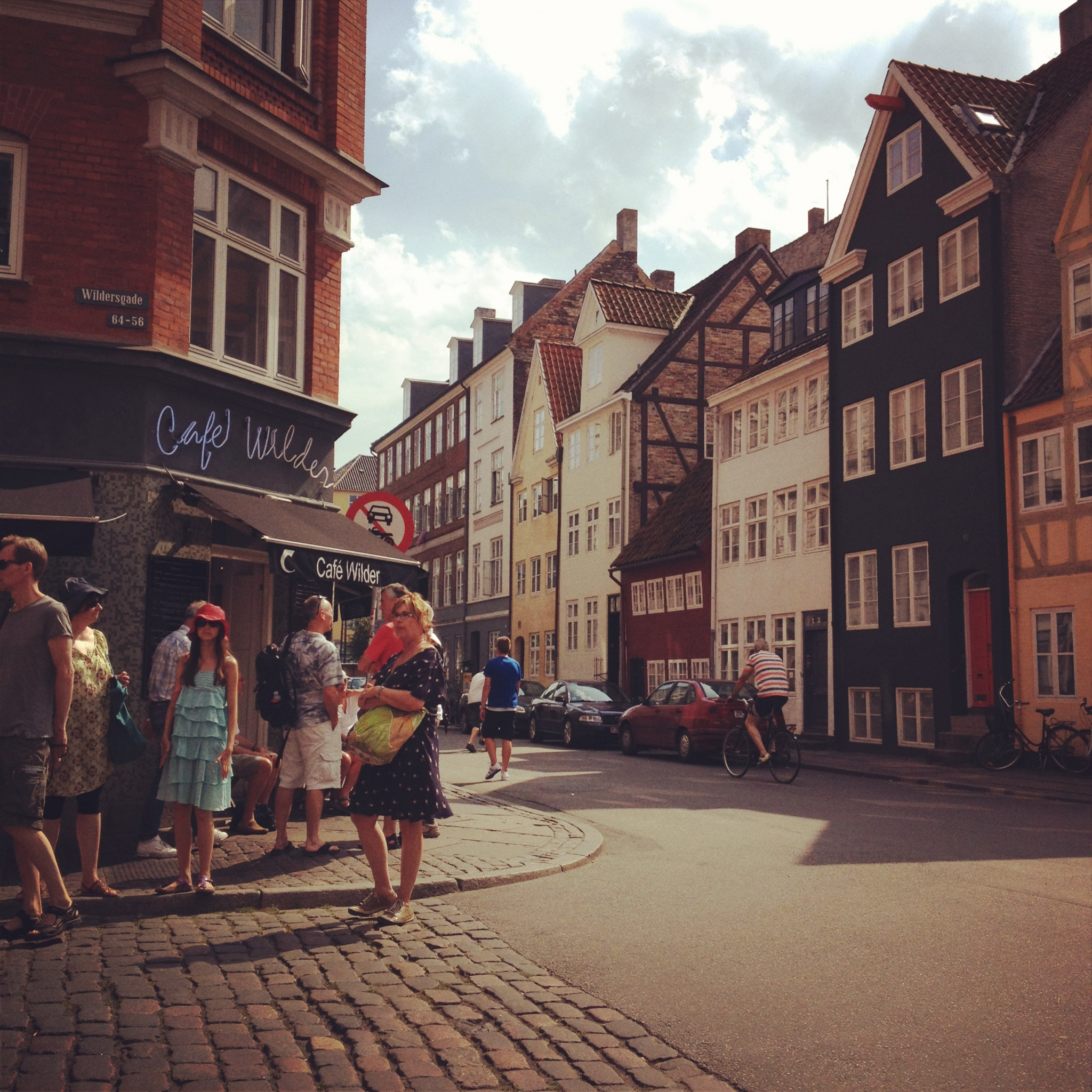
- Sankt Annæ Gade seen from WildersgadeScandinavia
- Interactive map of Sankt Annæ Gade
- Length: 1,266 m (4,154 ft)
- Location: Christianshavn, Copenhagen, Denmark
- Postal code: 1416
- Coordinates: 55°40′28.92″N 12°35′26.88″E

Sankt Annæ Gade is a street in the Christianshavn district of Copenhagen, Denmark. It connects the main harbourfront at Asiatisk Plads in the west to Christianshavn Rampart in the east via the Snorrebroen bridge. Church of Our Saviour is located in the street.

== History ==
=== Early history ===
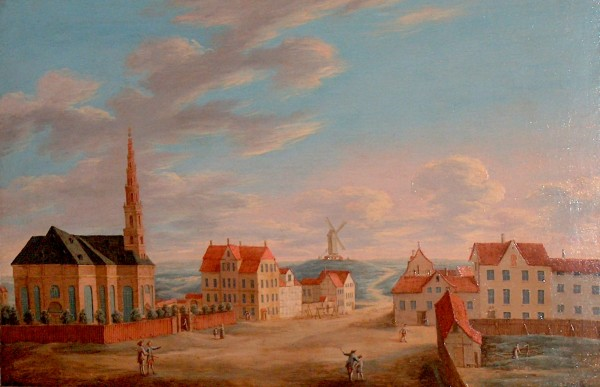
Church of Our Saviour in 1754

Founded in about 1620, Sankt Annæ Gade is one of the oldest streets in Christianshavn. It is named for Saint Anne, a patron saint of seamen. For more than a century, no bridge spanned the canal connecting the two halves of the street. Construction of townhouses soon began along the western half, while Christianshavn's first church, a temporary wooden structure, was built on the south side of the far end of the street in about 1640. The north side was used as the town's first graveyard. It was in these grounds, on the north side of the street, that construction of the present Church of Our Saviour began in 1882. It was inaugurated in 1696.

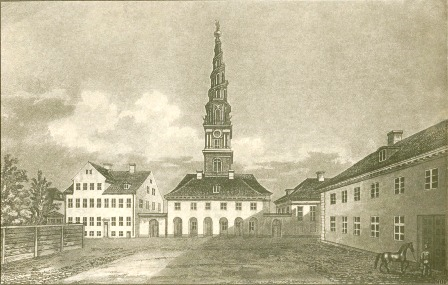
The veterinary school with Church of Our Saviour's spire in the background

=== The veterinary school ===
In 1772, instigated by the crown, Peter Christian Abildgaard, who had studied veterinary science in Lyon, began the construction of Denmark's first veterinary school on the site across the street from the church. The school was taken over by the crown in 1776. A number of new buildings were added over the course of the next decades.

=== The two prisons ===
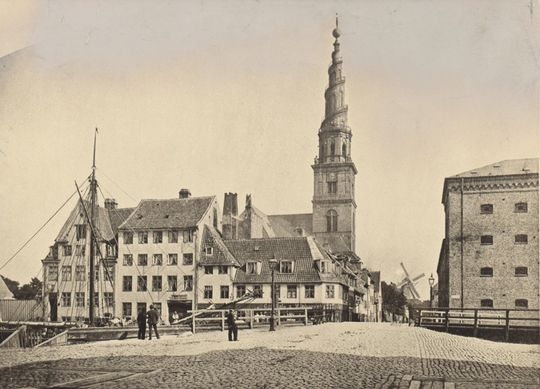
Sankt Annæ Gade with the Women's Prison seen to the left and Lille Mølle just visible in the background

In 1858, the Royal Veterinarian School left Sankt Annæ Gade when a large new Royal Veterinary and Agricultural College was inaugurated outside the city in Frederiksberg. The old buildings were all torn down and replaced by a prison complex which was used to accommodate prisoners from the neighbouring Christianshavn Penitentiary which was demolished in 1862 to make way for a modern prison building which was inaugurated in 1864 to designs by Niels Sigfred Nebelong. When the new building, which completely filled the block between Christianshavns Torv and Sankt Annæ Gade, was turned into a women's prison in 1870, the interim facility remained in use for male inmates. This lasted until 1908 when it became part of the women's prison, which finally closed in 1921.

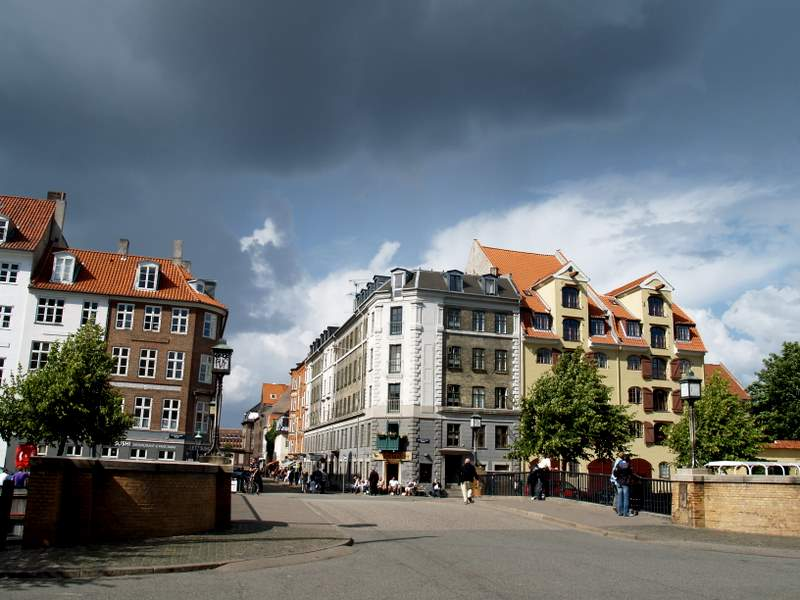
Sankt Annæ Gade at the bridge

== Bridge ==
The first bridge at the site was constructed in the early 18th century and private. It was opened to the public in 1785 and a new bridge was built for private means in 1786. It was purely for pedestrians and had a string (snurre, old form of the Danish word snor) at the middle to stop carriages from crossing, hence giving rise to the name. It opened to passing boats. The current bridge was built in its place in 1924.

== Notable buildings ==
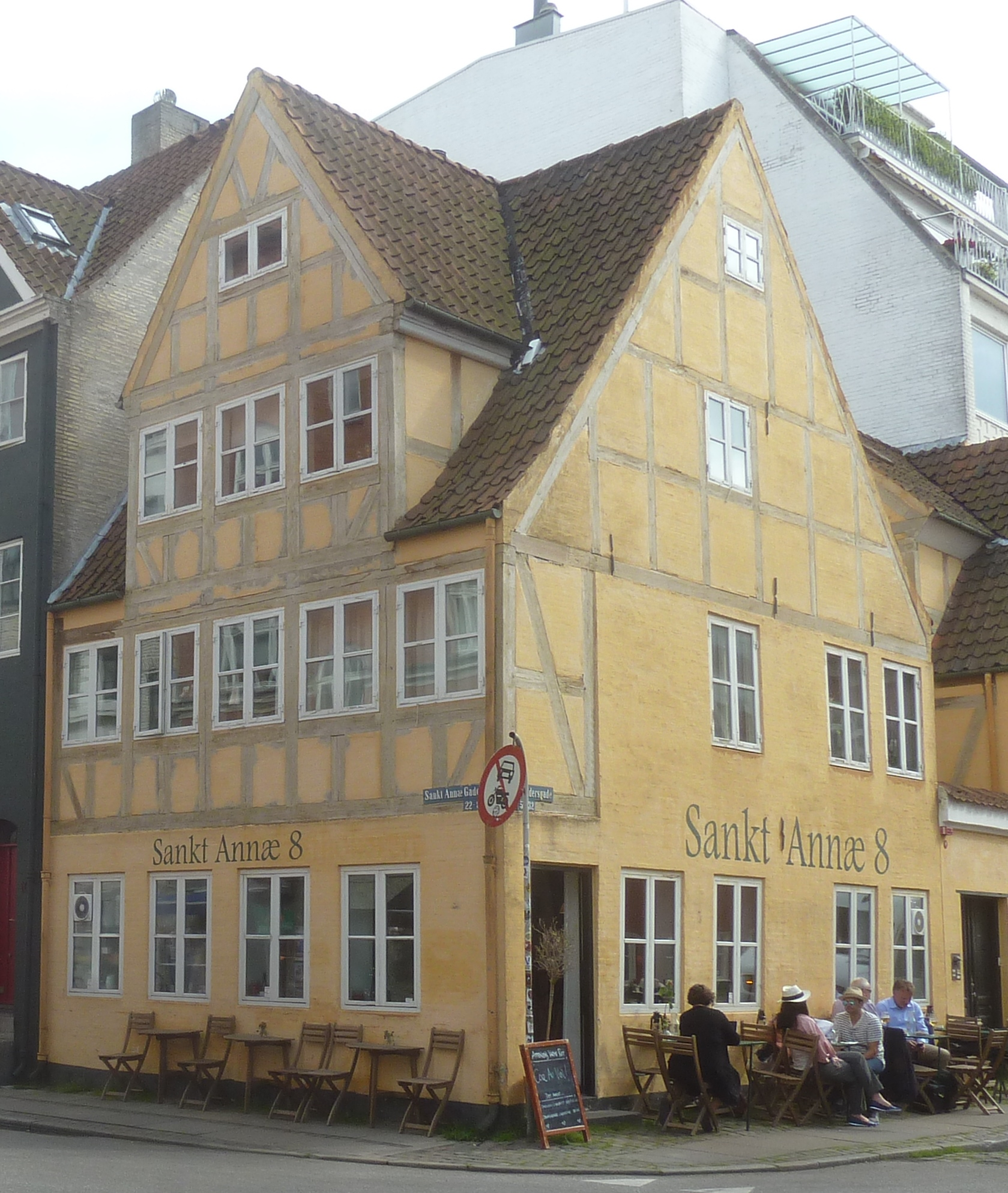
No. 8

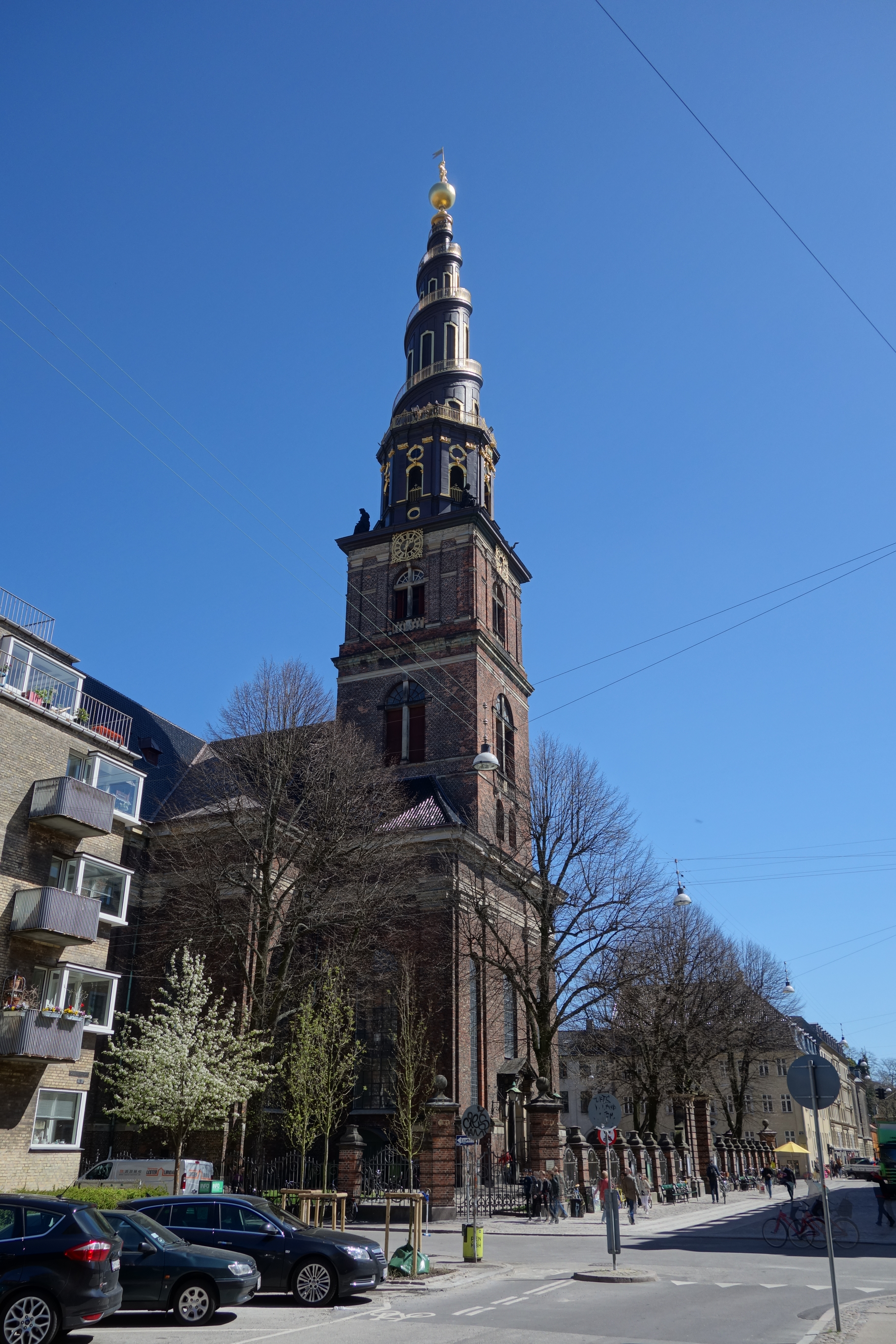
Church of Our Saviour seen from the street

The western section of the street, between Strandgade and the canal, is dominated by the 17th and 18th century townhouses with their colourful facades that are found throughout Christianshavn. The low red building at No. 14 is the last remains of the original row of one-storey, half-timbered houses which was built on the south side of the street by the lot's first owner, Johan Lauridsen, some time before 1635. The second floor was added some time during the 18th century. No. 4 is from about 1622 Other examples are the Toppe House on the corner of Strandgade is from 1733. No. 6 is from 1848, No. 10 from 1755, the narrow house at No. 12 from some time before 1779, No. 16 from before 1753, the Hans Burmand House from about 1750. They were all listed in 1950. No. 20-22 is from 1804 and was 1950.

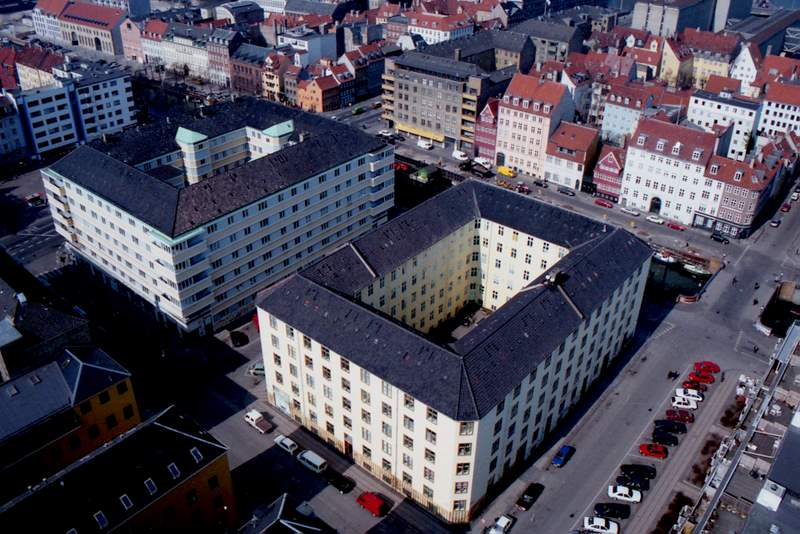
Edvard Thomsen's two blocks viewed from the top of Church of Our Saviour

The H-shaped building of the old men's prison opposite Our Saviour's Church still exists. It was acquired by a private consortium and converted into apartments and is now known as Sankt Annæs Gård. The Women's Prison was demolished and replaced by two large perimeter blocks designed by Edvard Thomsen. The one on Sankt Annæ Gade lacks the characteristic striped facade which has named its counterpart on Christianshavns Torv Lagkagehuset ('the Layer Cake House'). Also on the south side of the street, closest to Christianshavn Rampart is one of three detached wings of Ved Volden, a modernist housing complex completed in 1938 to designs by Tyge Hvass and Henning Jørgensen.

== See also ==
- Dronningensgade
