= Wilders Kanal =

Canal in Copenhagen, Denmark

Wilders Canal
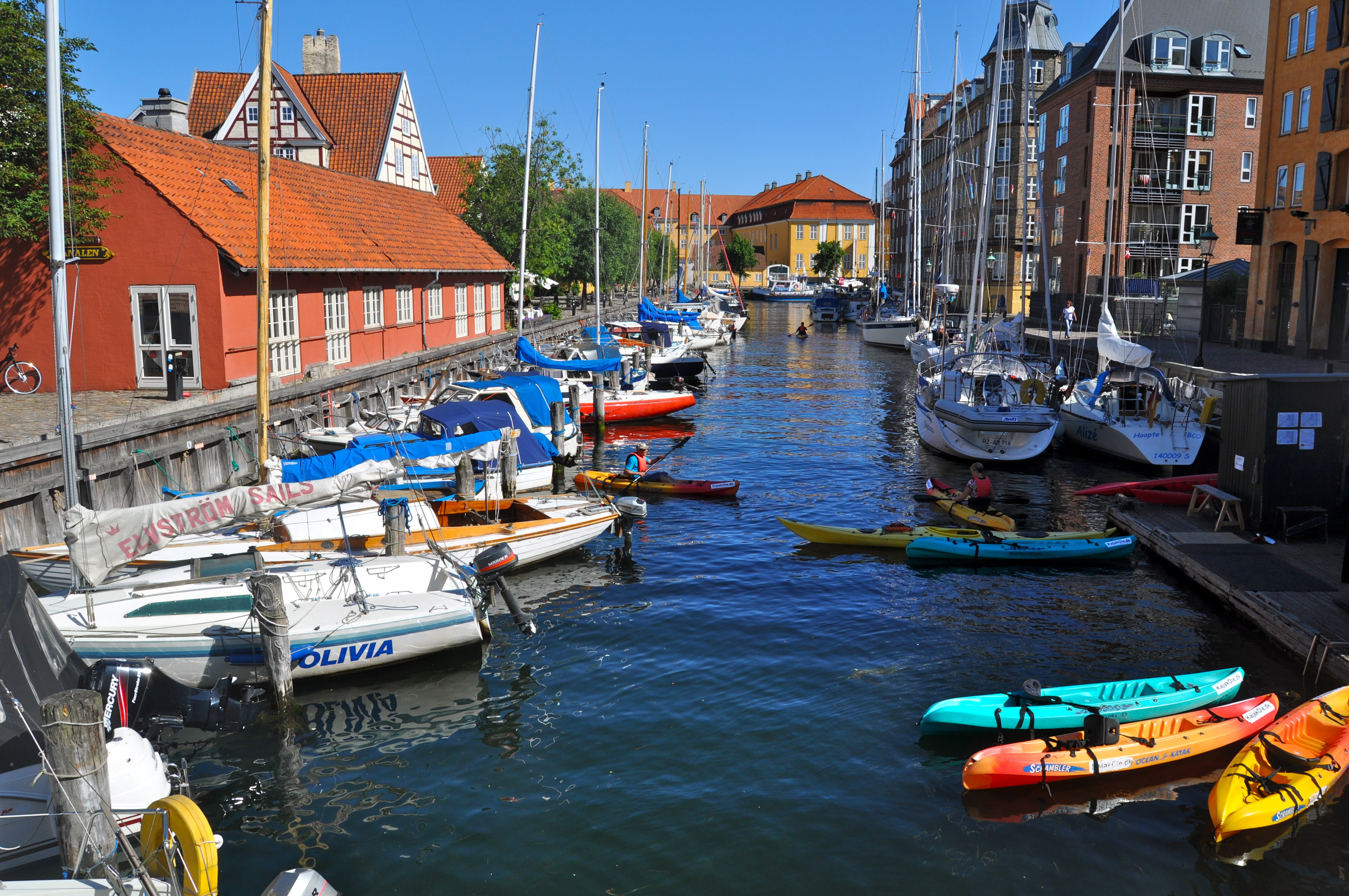
- Wilders Kanal with Wilders Bro and Søkvæsthuset as a backdrop
- Location: Copenhagen, Denmark

Geography
- Beginning coordinates: 55.6747°N 12.5940°E
- Ending coordinates: 55.6763°N 12.5919°E

Wilders Kanal (English: Wilder Canal) is a canal which connects Christianshavns Kanal to the main harbour, opposite Søkvæsthuset, in the Christianshavn neighbourhood of Copenhagen, Denmark. It is crossed by Wilders Bro which carries Strandgade.

The canal is named after father and son, Carl and Lars Wilder, who operated a shipyard in the area just north of it, now known as Wilders Plads.
