= Store Godthåb =

Historic building in Copenhagen, Denmark

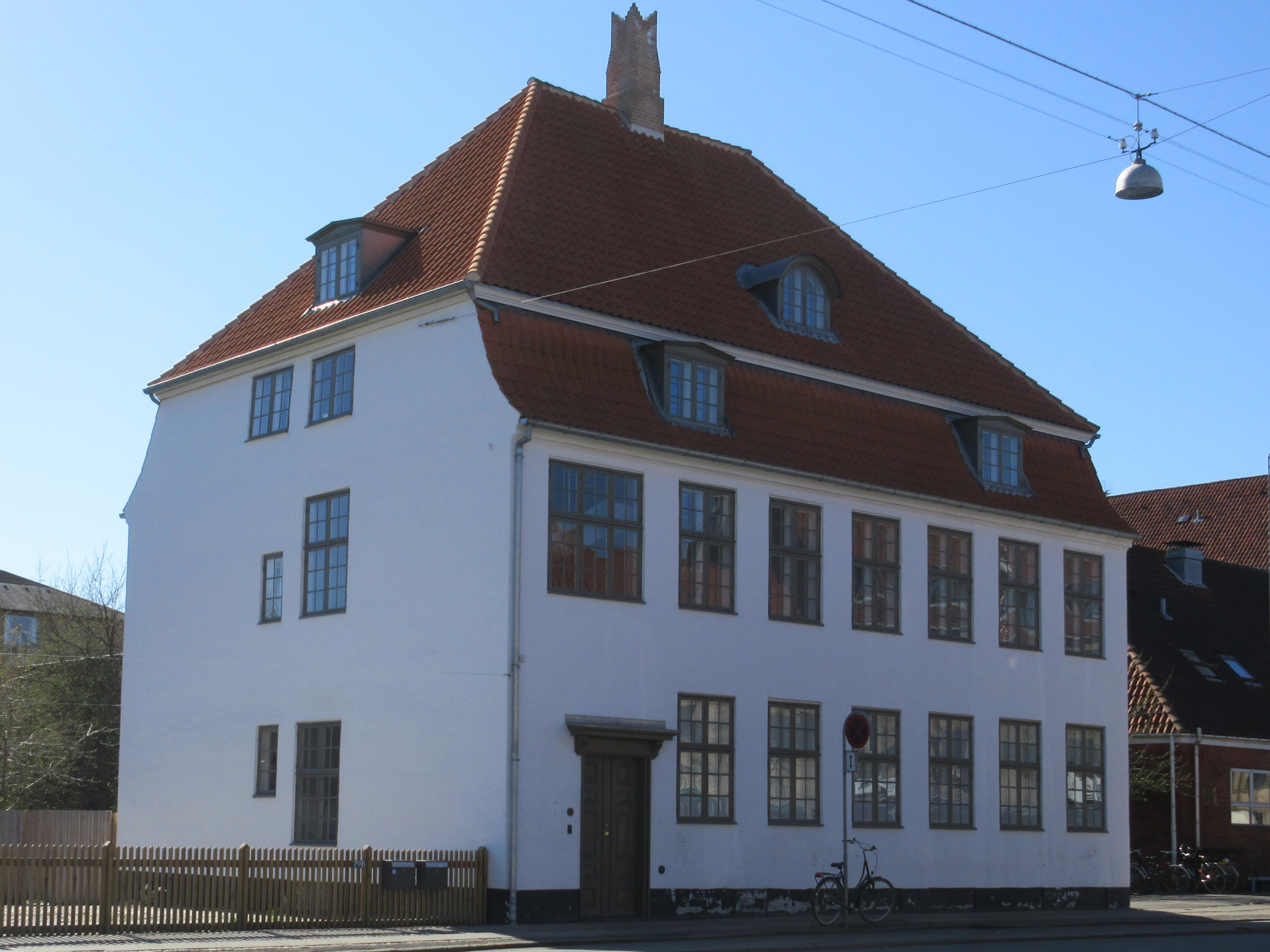
- The main building
- Interactive map of the Store Godthåb area

General information
- Location: Frederiksberg, Copenhagen, Denmark
- Coordinates: 55.6881°N 12.5257°E
- Completed: 1770

Design and construction
- Architect: Johan Christian Conradi (attribution)

Store Godthåb is a former late 18th-century country house in the Frederiksberg district of Copenhagen, Denmark. It is located on Godthåbsvej (No 79), which is named after the property, just west of its intersection with Nordre Fasanvej. The main building, a former barn and a third building were listed on the Danish registry of protected buildings and places in 1954.

== History ==
Store Godthåb is an example of the country houses which were built in the area after it had been auctioned off by the state in 1765. The house was built in 1770 for Henrich Wium, a manufacturer of face powder and starch. It is believed that Johan Christian Conradi designed the building. At that time, the estate covered large areas of land, both north and south of present-day Godthåbsvej.

Wium went bankrupt in 1775. Godthåb was therefore sold in forced auction. The buyer was Abraham Schneider, owner of the nearby Grøndal. He was the son-in-law of Joost van Hemert and thus the brother-in-law of Peter van Hemert and Gysbert Behagen. A few years later, Schneider came into economic difficulties and merged Godthåb and Grøndal into one large estate, demolished Grøndal's old buildings and renovated Wium's old main building. On 31 March 1785, Godthåb was divided into 17 lots and sold in public auction. Five of the lots, including the one with the main building, were sold to Johan Hansen. In 1787, he sold Godthåb to Frederik Fugl.

In 1792, Godthåb was sold to Baron Lucas de Bretton, a plantation owner from the Danish West Indies. The price was 52.000 Danish rigsdaler, which was to be paid in sugar and rum. Godthåb reverted to Fugl in 1795 when Bretton proved unable to pay.

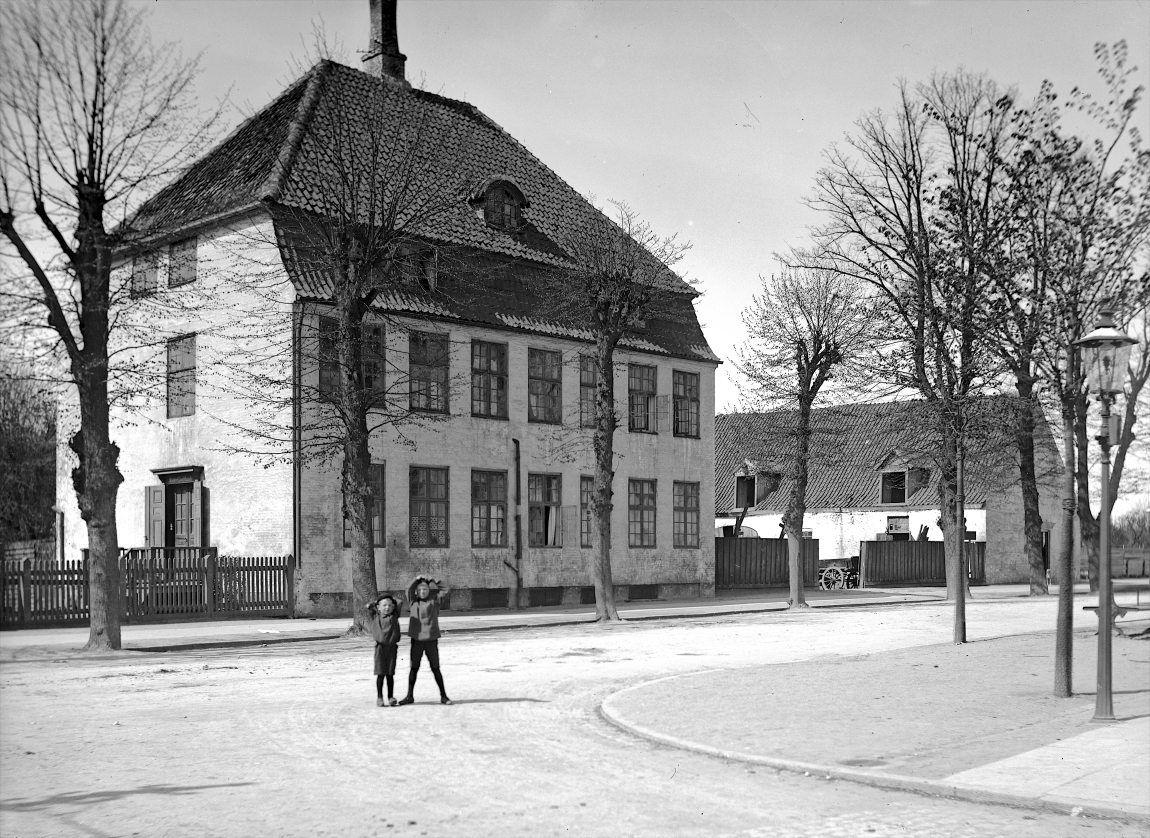
Store Godthåb in 1908

After the turn of the century, the land was gradually sold off in lots as the area along Godthåbsvej was built over, first with a low sprawl of one to three storeys and towards the end of the century by higher apartment buildings.

== Buildings ==
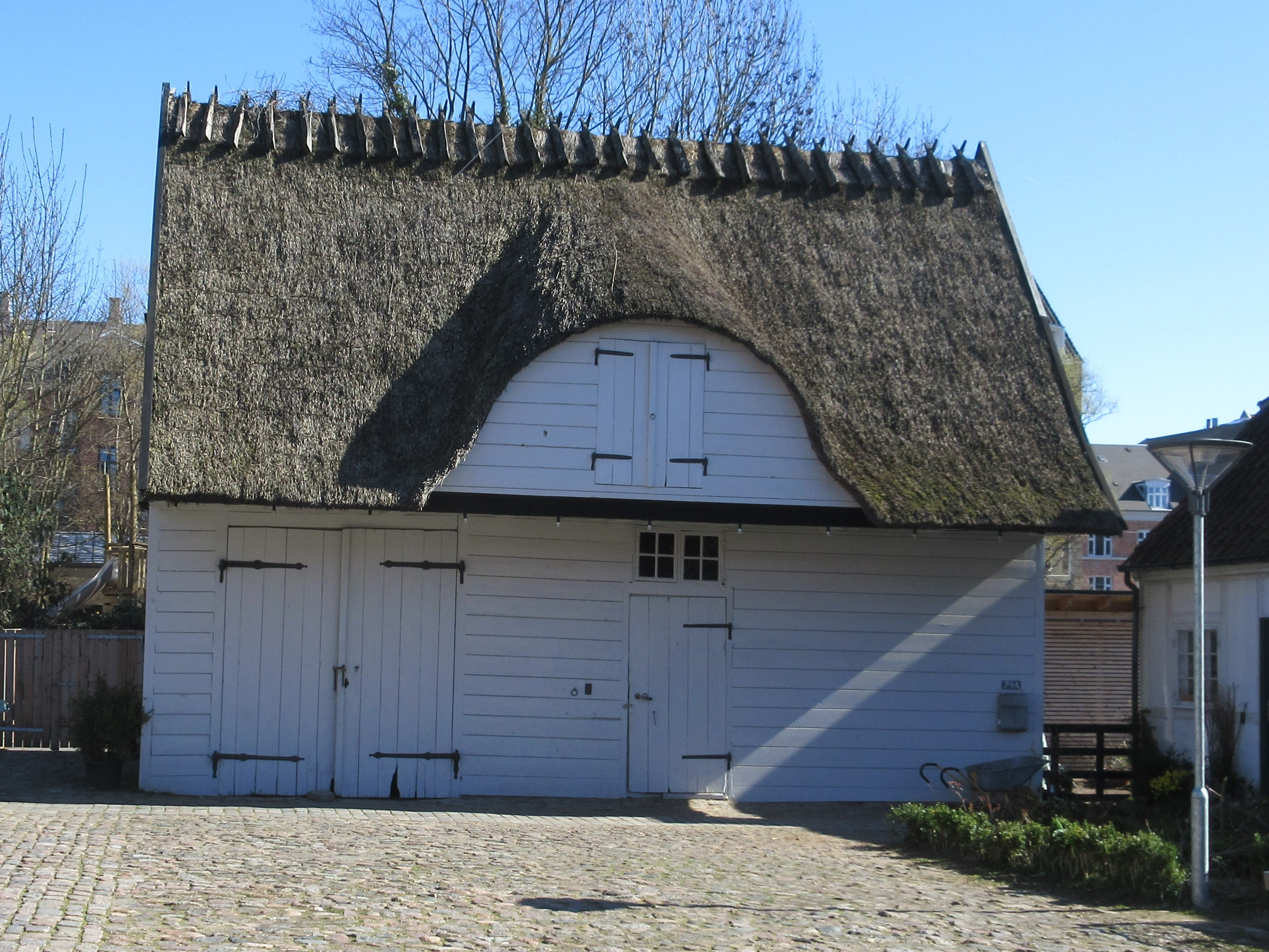
The old barn

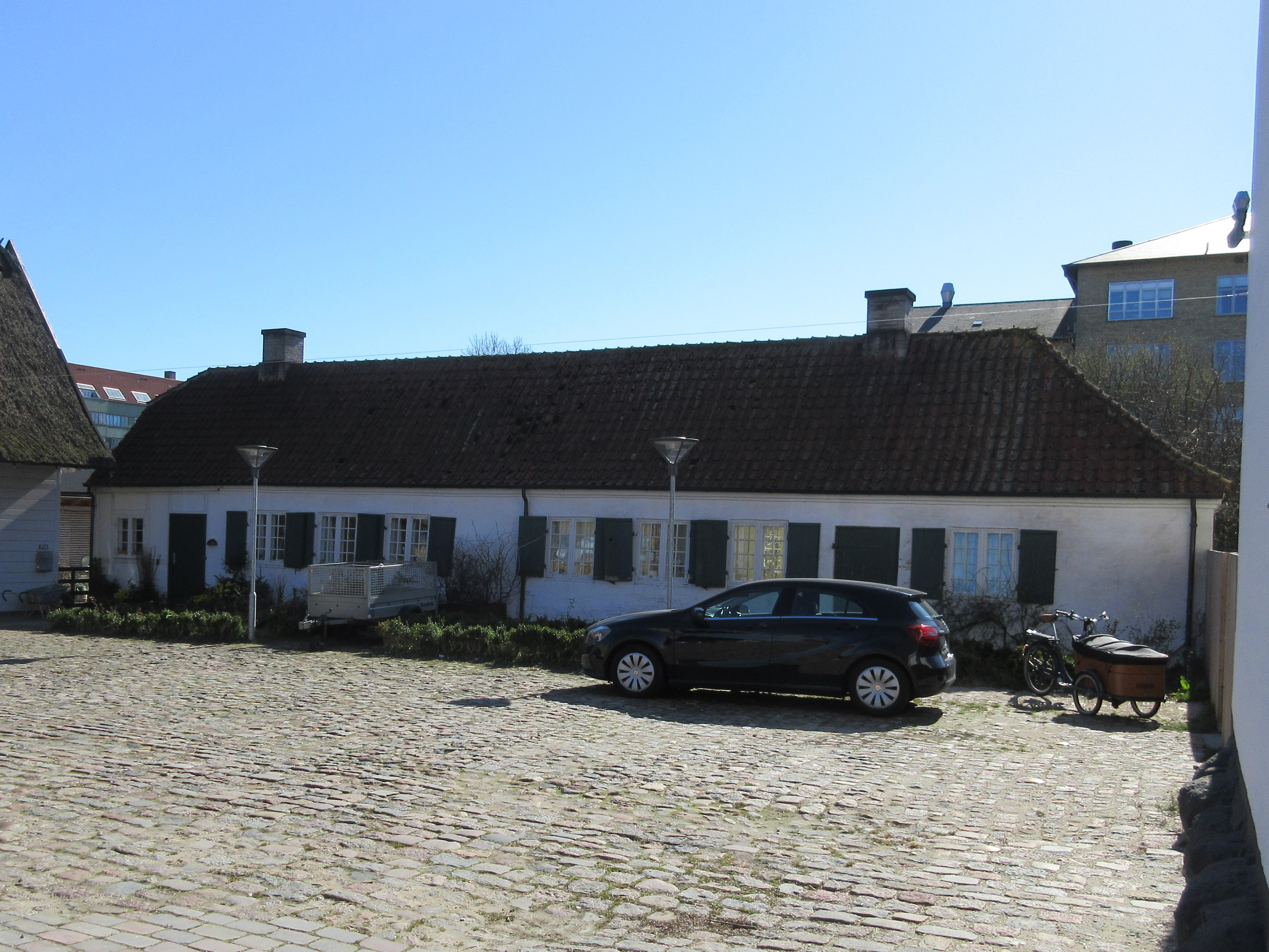
The Gardener's House

The property consists of three buildings surrounding a courtyard. The main building consists of two storeys under a high half-hipped tile roof. The two other buildings are a gardener's house from 1702 and a barn from about 1850. All three buildings and the courtyard were listed in 1954.

== See also ==
- Bakkehuset
