= Abraham Schneider =

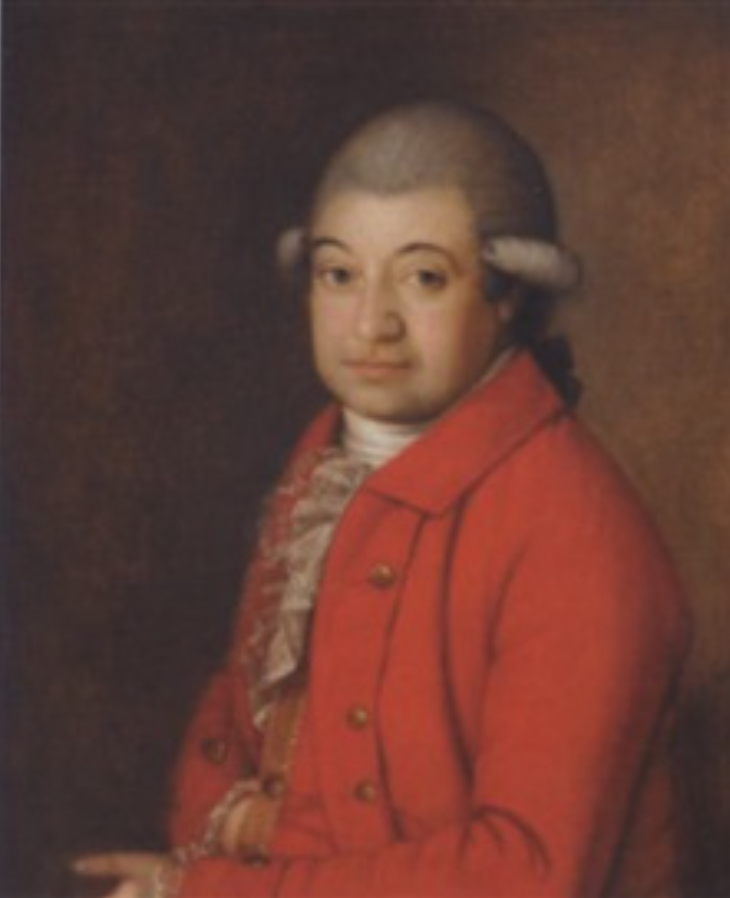
Abraham Schneider

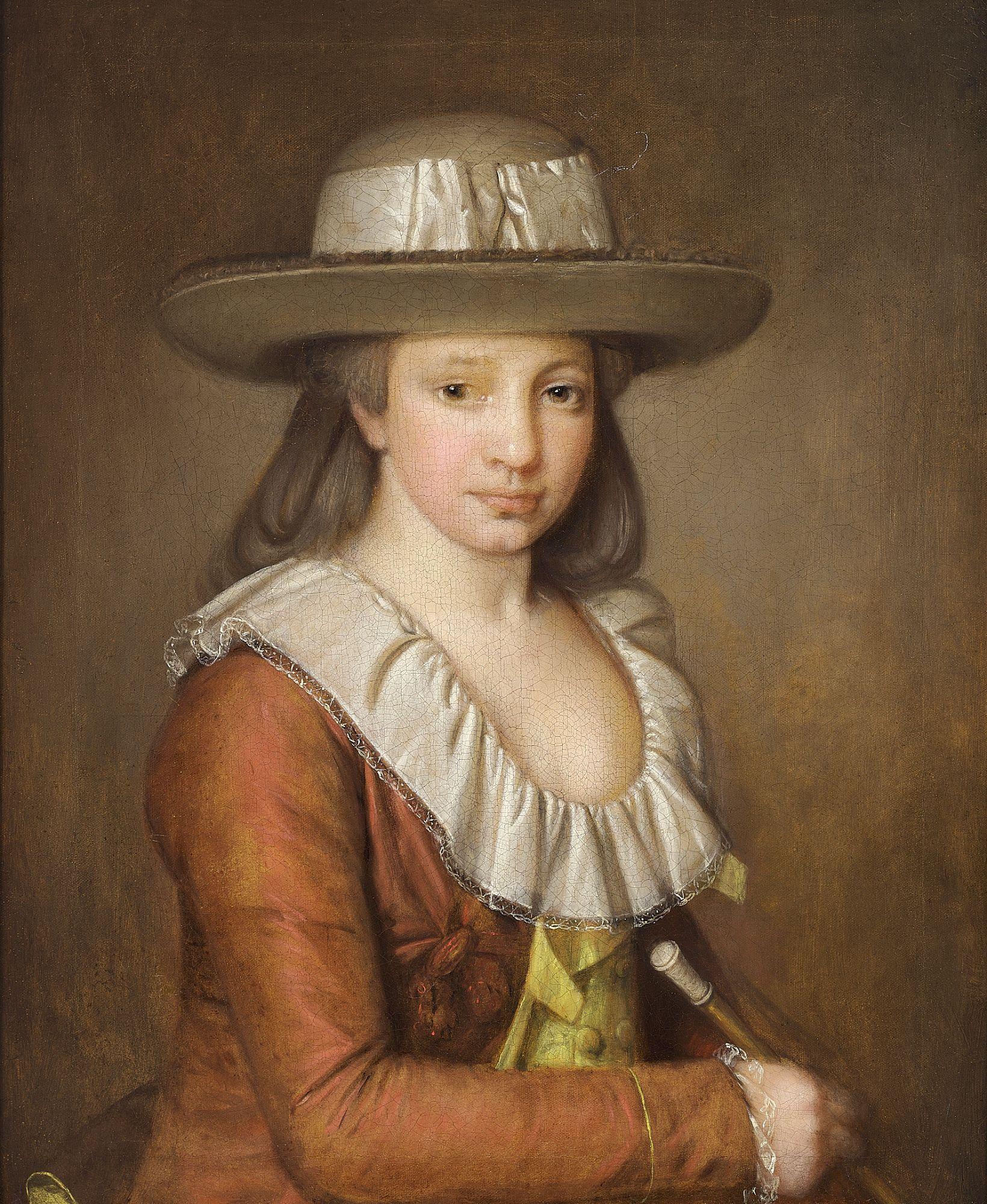
Elisabeth Schneider, painted by Erik Pauelsen

Abraham Schneider (9 May 1735 – 22 April 1795) was a German-Danish businessman, industrialist and ship-owner. He owned Jonstrup Textile Mill in Jonstrup outside Copenhagen as well as the country house Store Godthåb in Frederiksberg.

== Biography ==
Abraham Schneider was born on 9 May 1735 in Canton Bern. Switzerland. He came to Copenhagen to work for Reinhard Iselin. In 1762, he worked as a bookkeeper in Iselin's office (Købmager Quarter No. 22), together with another Swiss immigrant, Christopher Battier. In 1769, Schneider was married to Joost van Hemert's daughter Elisabeth. This made him the brother-in-law of Peter van Hemert and Gusbert Behagen.

Schneiderestablished his own trading firm. He was a co-owner of the ships Baronesse Iselin, Wenskabet, Constantia and Patientis. He was awarded the prestigious titles of Court Agent (Gof-Agent) and etatsråd.

In 1774, Schneider bought the country house Grøndal in Frederiksberg. In In 1776, he also bought the neighboring country house Store Godthåb. He merged the two properties into one, large estate, demolished Grøndal's buildings and refurbished Store Godthåb's old main building.

In 1777, Schneider bought Jonstrip Textile Mill. The factory was destroyed by fire in 1778. A large new building complex was completed in 1781.

In 1778, he borrowed 45,000 Danish rigsdaler from his father-in-law. In 1783, he obtained a loan of 130,000 rigsdaler from the government. In the same year, he went bankrupt.

On 31 March 1795, Store Godthåb was sold. Schneider died on 22 April 1795 in Paris.

== Legacy ==
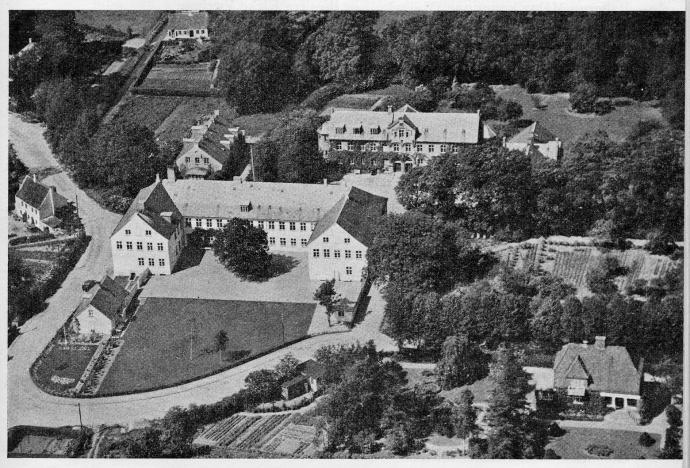
Jonstrup Seminarium

Konstrupgård (the textile mill's former main building) was later converted into a teacher training college (Jonstrup Seminarium). It is now home to a public school. Store Godthåb was listed in the Danish Registry of Protected buildings and Places in 1918.

Erik Pauelsen painted a pair of portrait paintings of Schneider and his wife.
