= Van Hemert =

van Hemert/van Heemert is a Dutch surname. Notable people with the surname include:

- Barend van Hemert (1891–1945), Dutch footballer
- Hans van Hemert (born 1945), Dutch music producer
- Joost van Hemert (1696–1775), Danish merchant, financier and shipowner
- Mirjam van Hemert (born 1950), Dutch swimmer
- Peter van Hemert (1734–1810), Danish merchant and shipowner, son of Joost
- Roel van Hemert (born 1984), Dutch footballer
- Ruud van Hemert (1938–2012), Dutch film director
- Willy van Hemert (1912–1993), Dutch actor, director and songwriter
