= Taastrup Teater =

Coordinates: 55.6553°N 12.2956°E

Taastrup Theatre
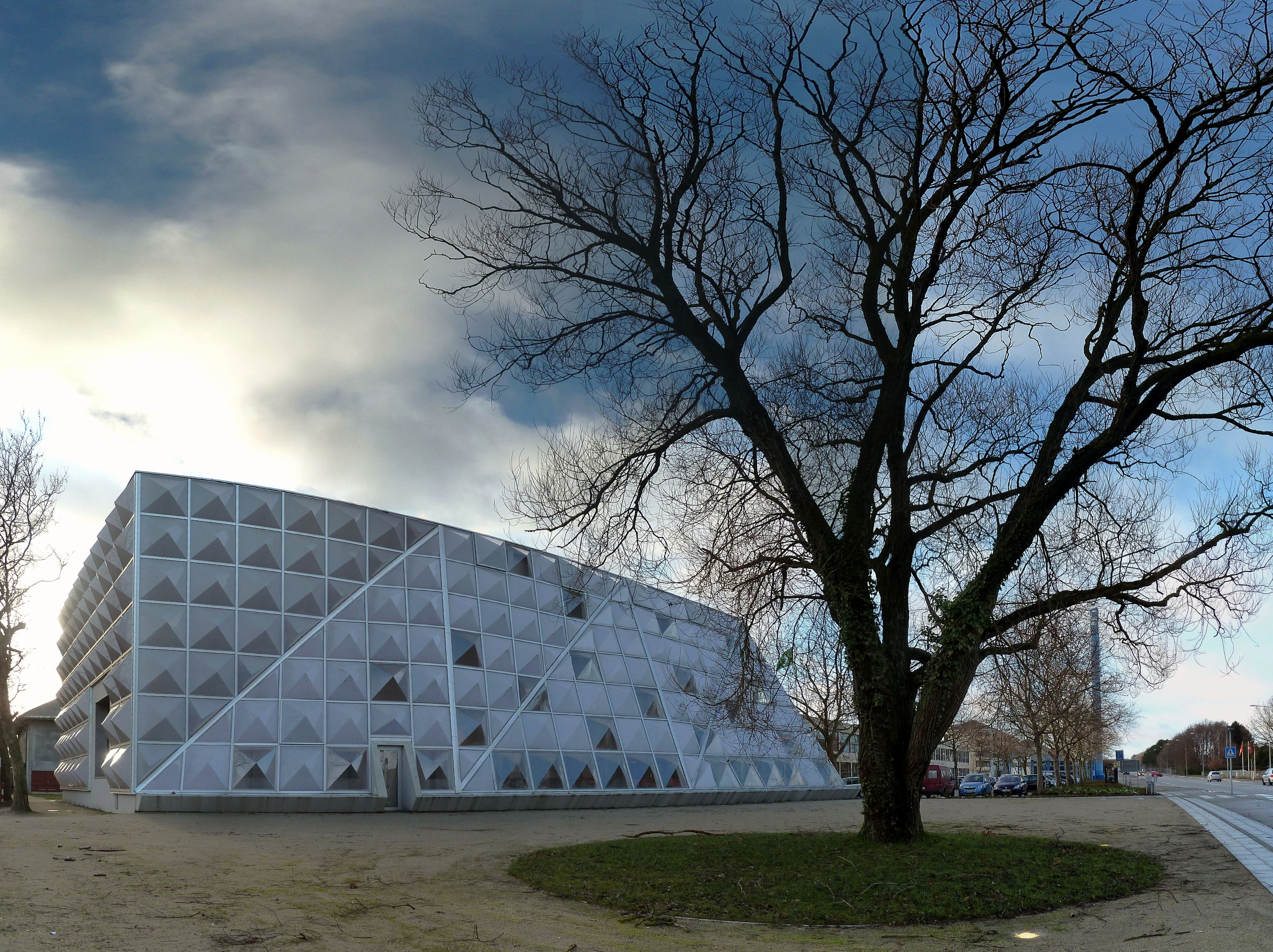
- The new foyer
- Interactive map of Taastrup Theatre
- Address: Kjeld Abels Plads, 2630 Taastrup; Taastrup, Copenhagen; Denmark
- Capacity: seats

Construction
- Opened: 1970
- Architect: COBE

Website
- Official website

Taastrup Teater is a theatre in Taastrup in the western suburbs of Copenhagen, Denmark.

== History ==
Taastrup Theatre was founded by a group of local residents in 1970. It received its current name and engaged an artistic director in 1987. The repertoire was also changed.

== Building ==
The theatre is based in a community centre from the 1970s which was expanded several times during the 1990s.

COBE was expanded the theatre with a new foyer. It consists of a curtain that slope away from the existing building. It consists of translucent and clear acrylic triangles which are illuminated by red lights from within when the theatre is sold out.
