= Grønlandske Handels Plads =

Square in Copenhagen, Denmark

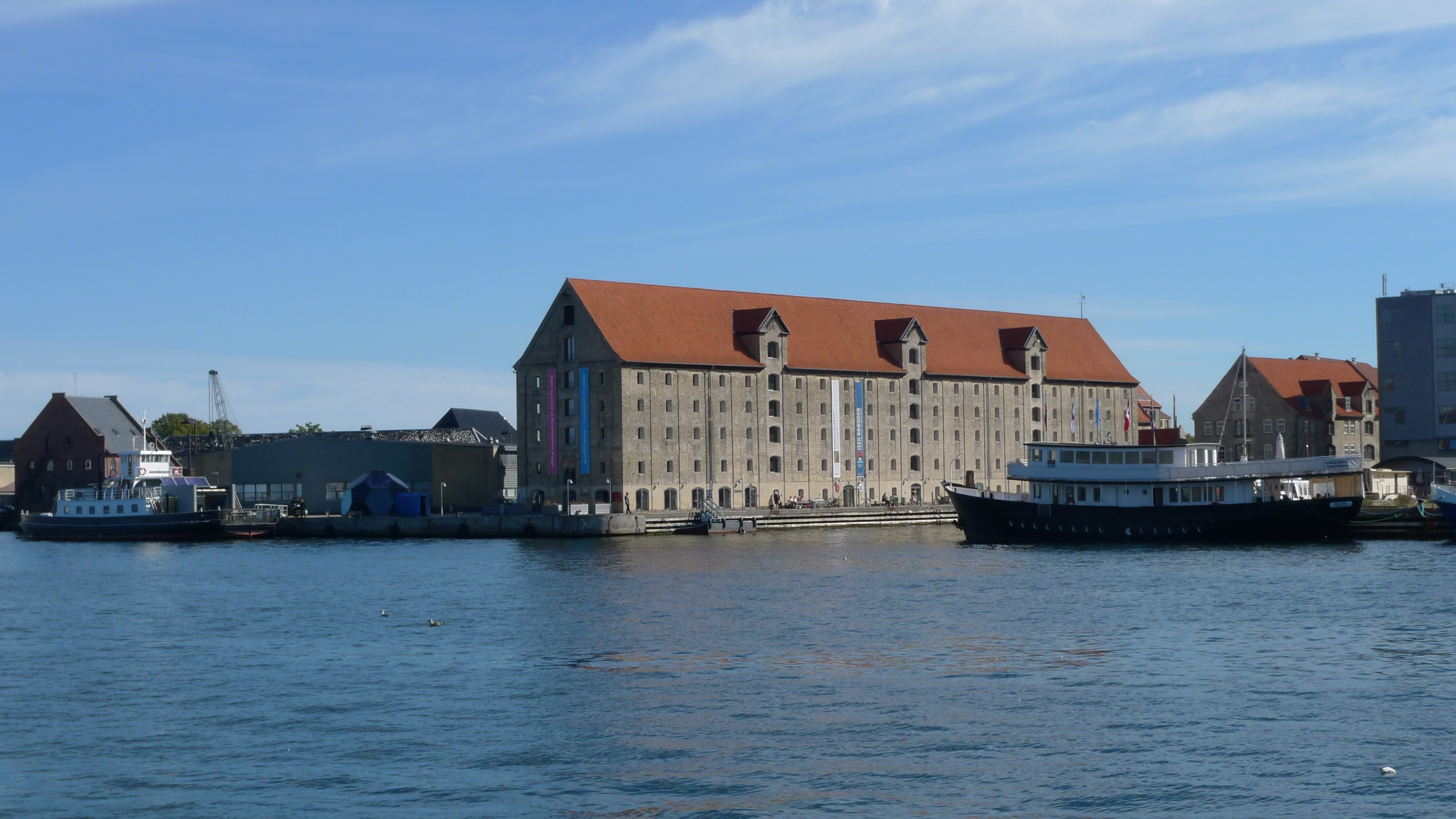
Grønlandske Handelsplads viewed from the water

(Kongelige) Grønlandske Handels Plads (English: "(Royal) Greenland Dock") is a waterfront area at the end of Strandgade in the northwestern corner of the Christianshavn neighbourhood of Copenhagen, Denmark. The area is bounded by the Trangraven canal to the north, Christianshavn Canal to the east, Krøyers Plads to the south and the main harbor to the west. The waterfront is also known as Nordatlantens Brygge (English: North Atlantic Quay). It is named for the Royal Greenland Trading Department and was for more than 200 years a hub for Danish trade on Greenland, Iceland and the Faroe Islands. The most notable building is North Atlantic House, an 18th-century warehouse now used as a cultural centre for the North Atlantic area.

The threeway Trangravsbroen bridge connects Grønlandske Handelsplads to Holmen on the other side of Trangraven and Bodenhoffs Plads (Islands Plads) on the other side of Christianshavn Canal while the Inderhavnsbroen bridge connects the area to Nyhavn on the other side of the harbor.

== History ==
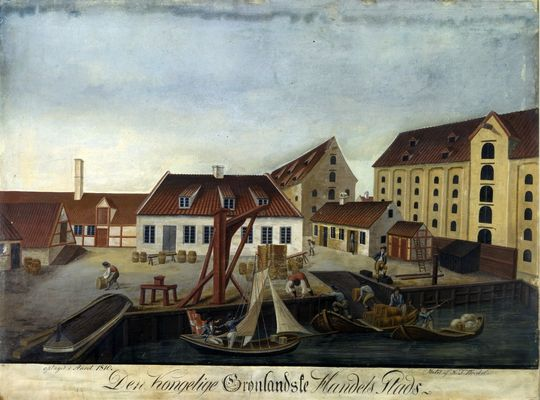
Royal Greenland Dock painted by N. J. Bredal in 1910

Grønlandske Handels Plads is part of the area that Andreas Bjørn reclaimed in the 1730s for his shipyard which became known as Bjørnholm ("Bjørn's Isle"). In 1747, Bjørn sold the northern part of the site to Det almindelige Handelsselskab ("The General Trading Company") which in 1750 obtained a monopoly on trade on Greenland. From 1763 the company was also responsible for trade on Iceland, Finmarken and the Faroe Islands. Master builder Johan Christian Conradi was commissioned to build a large warehouse for the company which was completed in 1767. Conradi had led the construction of the Eigtved Warehouse for the Danish Asia Company at Asiatisk Plads in 1750 and later also been involved in the construction of several other large warehouses in Christianshavn either as a builder or architect. The new warehouse was initially known as the Icelandic Warehouse and later as the Greenlandic Warehouse.

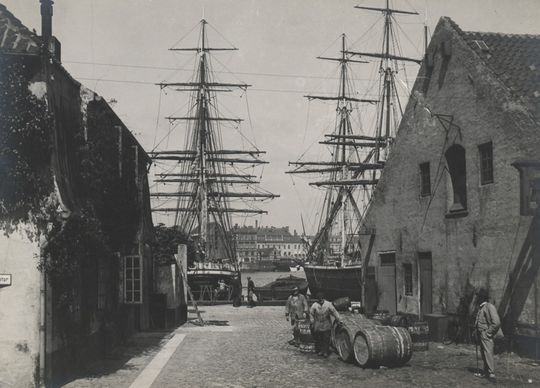
Grønlandske Handels Plads in the 1900s

In 1774, Det Almindelige Handelsselskab was dissolved and the Royal Greenland Trading Department came under direct control of the state. The southern part of Grønlandske Handels Plads was sold to Hans Krøyer in 1802 and became known as Krøyers Plads. Krøyers Plads was reacquired by Royal Greenland in 1938. The company sold the area to the Danish state in 1975 but continued to use the buildings until 1980. The buildings were left empty for a few years but then were used by the Danish Customs and Taxes Authority, then by the Danish Polar Center and University of Copenhagen's Arctic Institute and Institute of Eskimology.

== Public art ==
On the quayside next to Danish Polar Center stands Eva Sørensen's granite sculpture Pearl Anglais. It is three and a half metres high, weight 13 tons, and consists of five volumes in a Cairn-like composition.

== Notable buildings ==
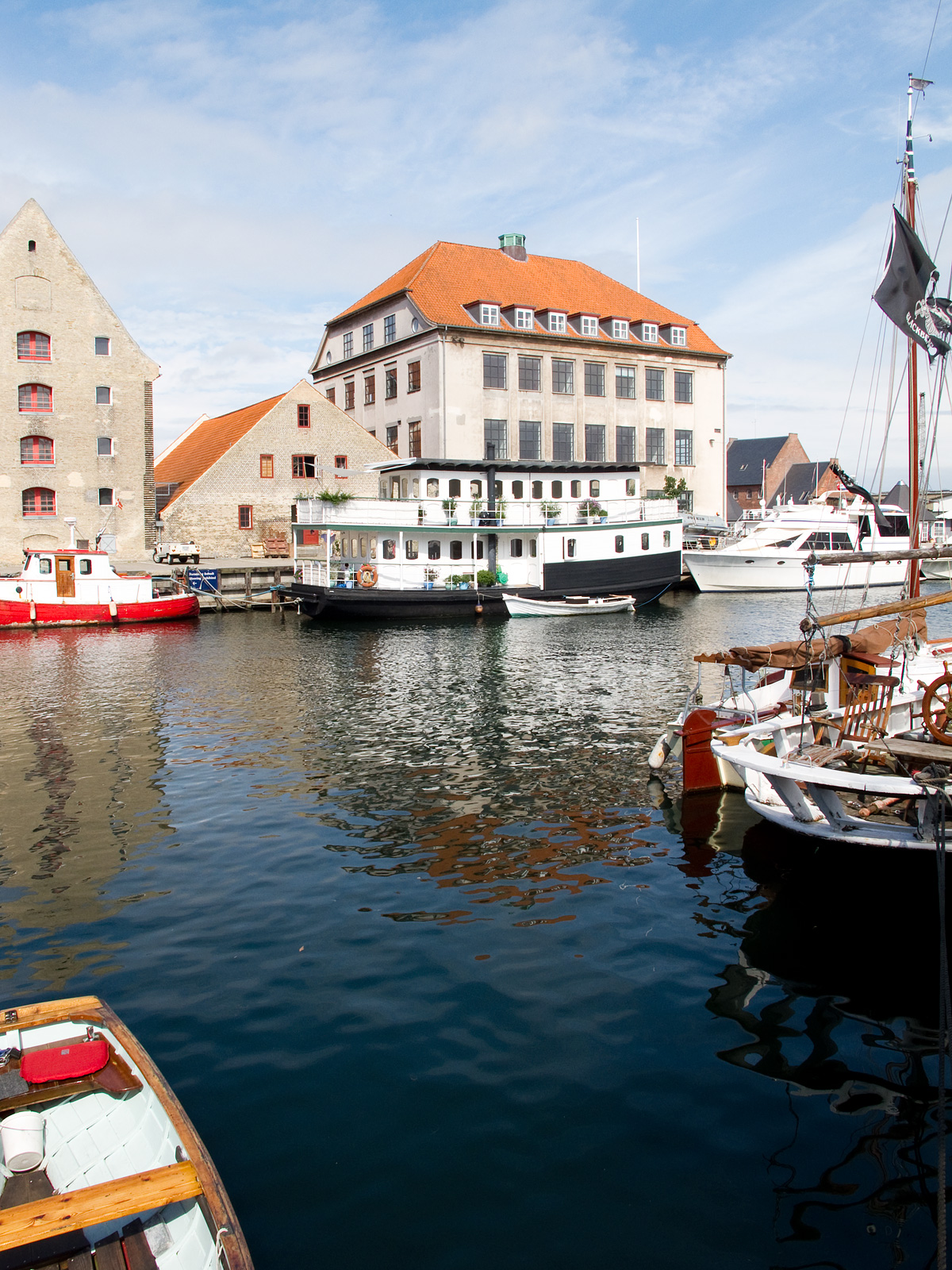
Strandgade 104 (left), 106 (middle) and 108 viewed from the other side of Christianshavn Canal

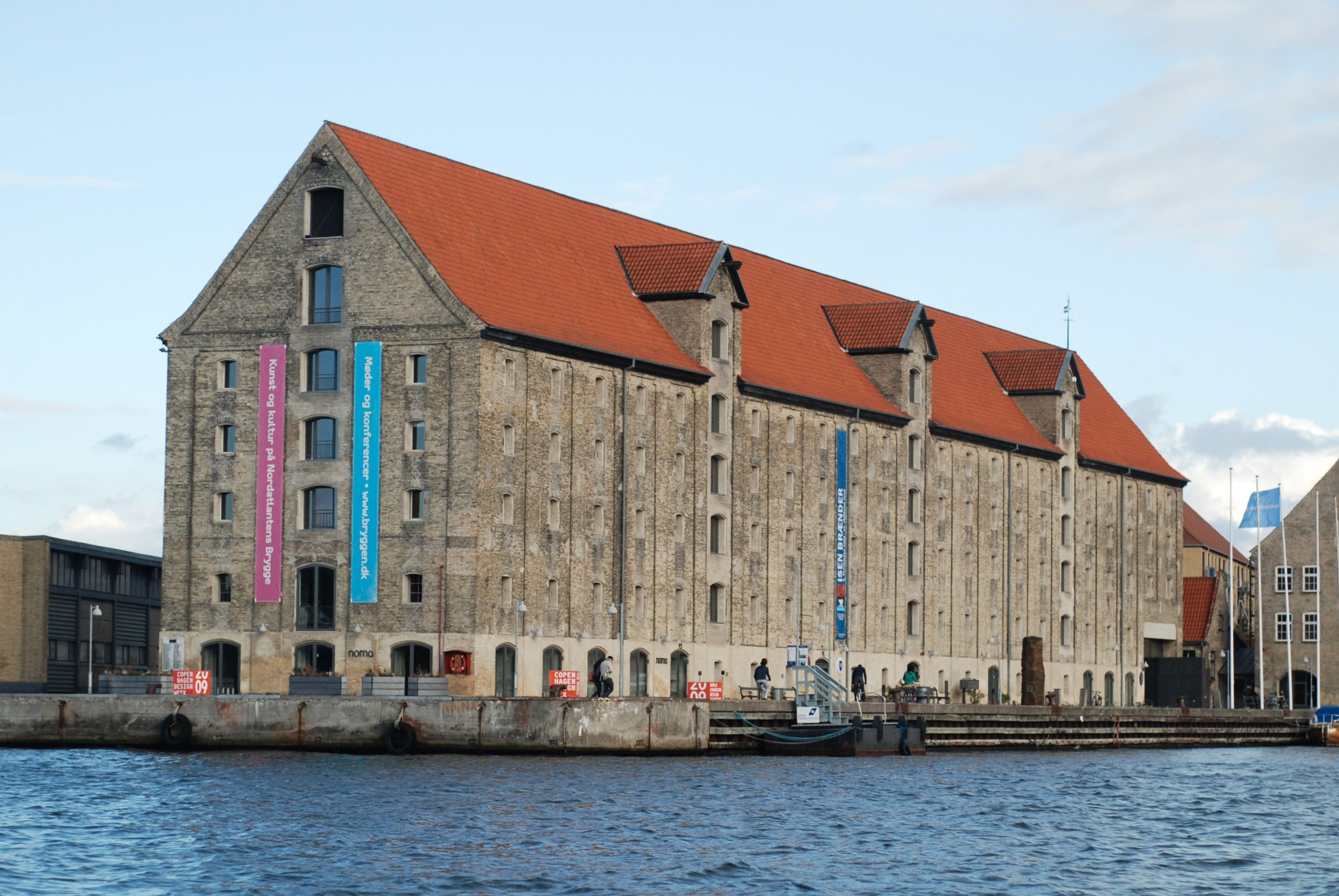
North Atlantic House

Conradi's warehouse is now known as North Atlantic House. The building contains representations of Greenland, Iceland and the Faroe Islands as well as a cultural centre dedicated to the North Atlantic area. Restaurant Noma was originally based in the building.

A row of four smaller buildings is located on the east side of Strandgade with their gables facing Christianshavn Canal. Danish Polar Center occupies the building at Strandgade 102. Then follows the so-called Skindpakhuset ("The Hide Warehouse", No. 104), a listed warehouse from 1906. Strandgade 106, which is variously known as Det Brede Pakhus ("The Wide Warehouse") or Store Bakkehus ("Great Warehouse"), is from 1781 and also listed. No. 108, located on the corner of Christianshavn Canal and Trangraven, is now home to the one Michelin starred restaurant 108. It is operated by the same owners as Noma.

== Redevelopment ==
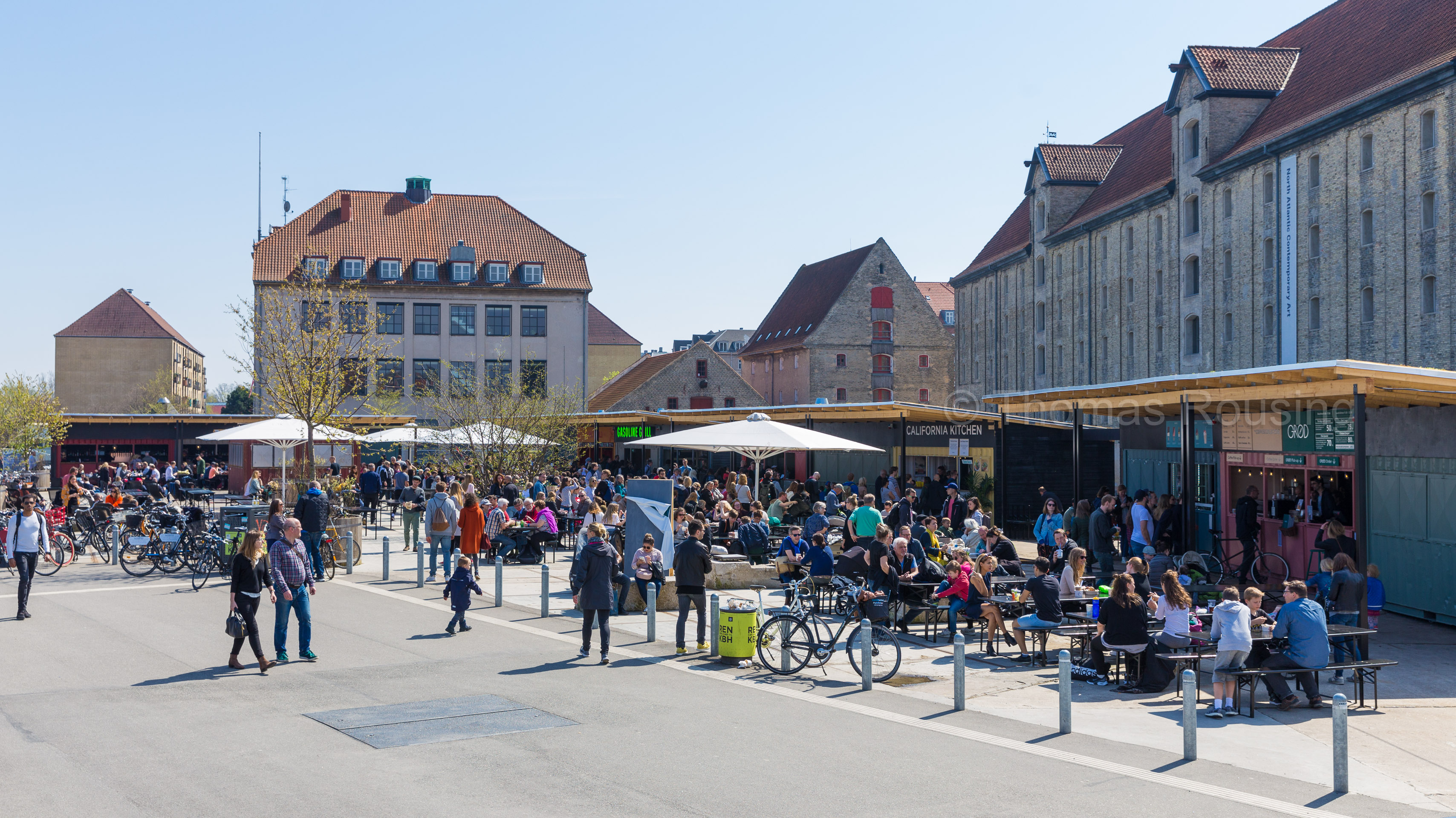
Grønlandske Handels Plads food market

Grønlandske Handelsplads has an area of approximately 6000 square metres. An architectural competition for the design of a new masterplan for Grønlandske Handelsplads, Christiansholm, Arsenaløen and Dokøen was launched in 2015.
