= Behagen House =

Historic building in Copenhagen, Denmark

- Behagens Gård
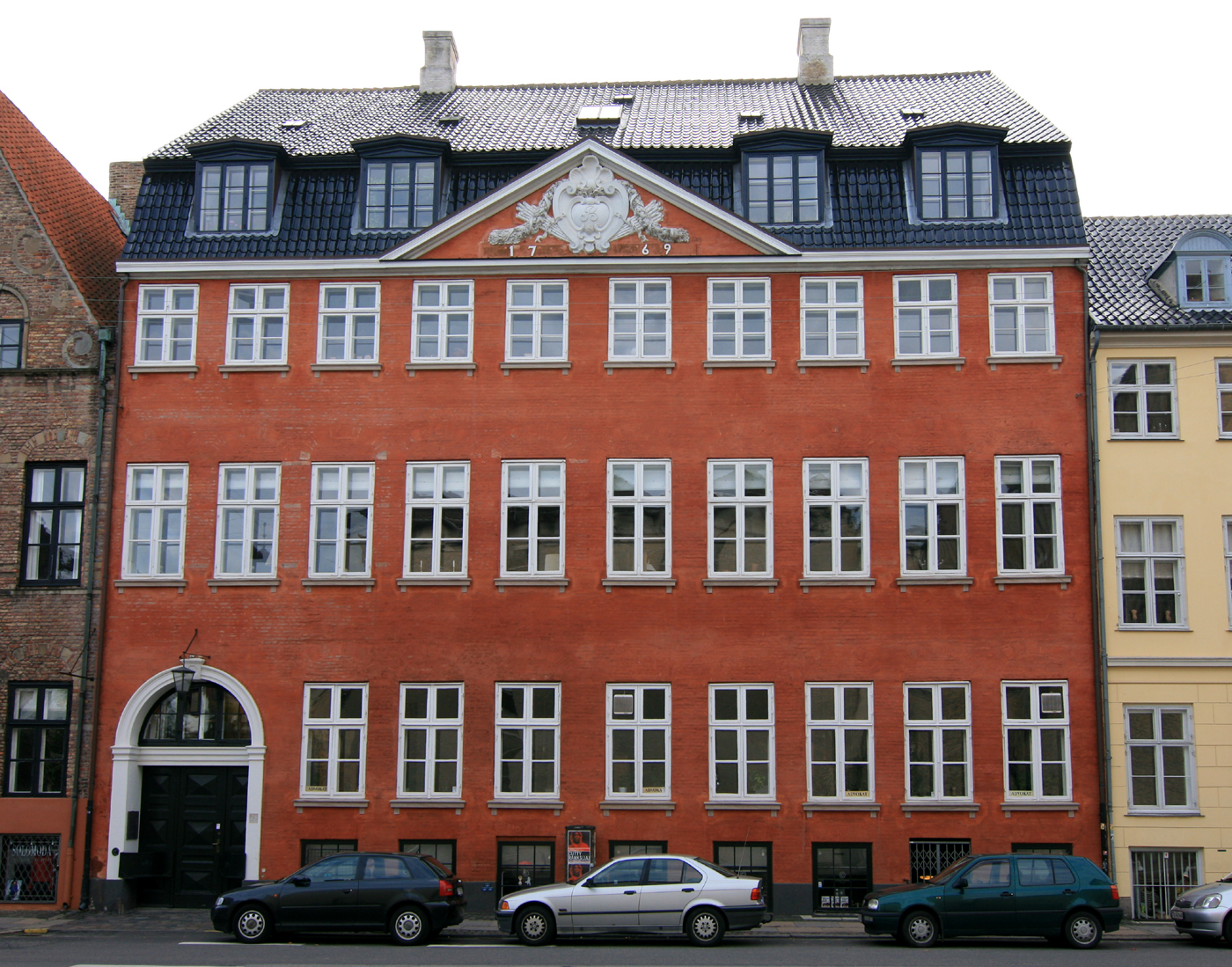
- The building seen from across the street
- Interactive map of the Behagen House area

General information
- Architectural style: Neoclassical
- Location: Copenhagen, Denmark, Denmark
- Coordinates: 55°40′26″N 12°35′24″E
- Completed: 1769
- Client: Gysbert Behagen

The Behagen House is a Neoclassical townhouse located at Strandgade 26 in the Christianshavn neighbourhood of Copenhagen, Denmark. The building was listed on the Danish registry of protected buildings and places in 1918.

== History ==
=== origins ===
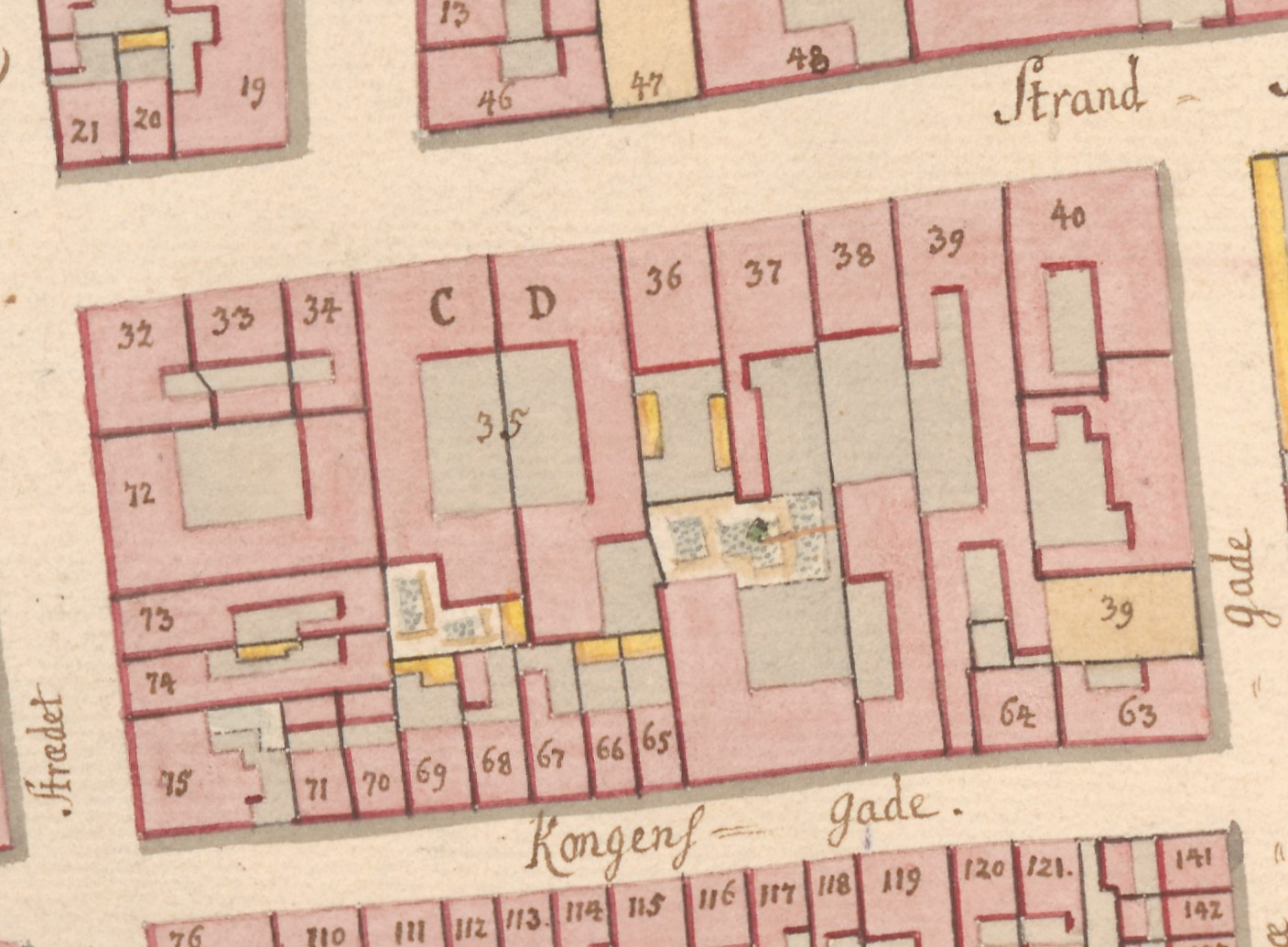
No. 36 C seen on a detail from Christian Gedde's map of Christianshavn Quarter, 1757.

Two houses similar to the neighbouring Sigvart Grubbe House at No. 28 were built at the site by Sigvart Grubbe in 1626. One of the properties was listed as No. 19 in Copenhagen's first cadastre of 1689 and was at that time owned by one schoutbynacht Dreier. The other one was as No. 20 owned by soap manufacturer Peder Hansen.

The old No. 19 was listed as No. 36 in the new cadastre of 1756 and was at that time owned by a widow named Hegelund. The old No 20 was as No. 37 owned by etatsråd Frederik Holmsted. Holmsted owned the property from 1739 to 1769.

=== Behagen family ===
In 1759, Gysbert Behagen, a wealthy merchant, acquired one of the two houses. In 1764, he obtained a royal licence to establish a sugar refinery in the yard. In 1768, Behagen also acquired the other house and in 1769 he undertook a comprehensive renovation of his properties, merging them into one building. Behagen lived there until his death in 1783. In 1791, the house was acquired by Jeppe Prætorius, another merchant. In 1796, it was subject to another renovation.

The property was home to 22 residents at the 1787 census. Elisabeth Giertrud Behagen resided in the building with her son Joost Johan Behagen, her daughter-in-law Maria Agatha Augusta and their one-year-old daughter Elisabeth Alida Augusta, sugar refinery master Christen Herbom and another nine employees associated with the refinery were also part of the household. The staff consisted of a housekeeper, five maids and a coachman.

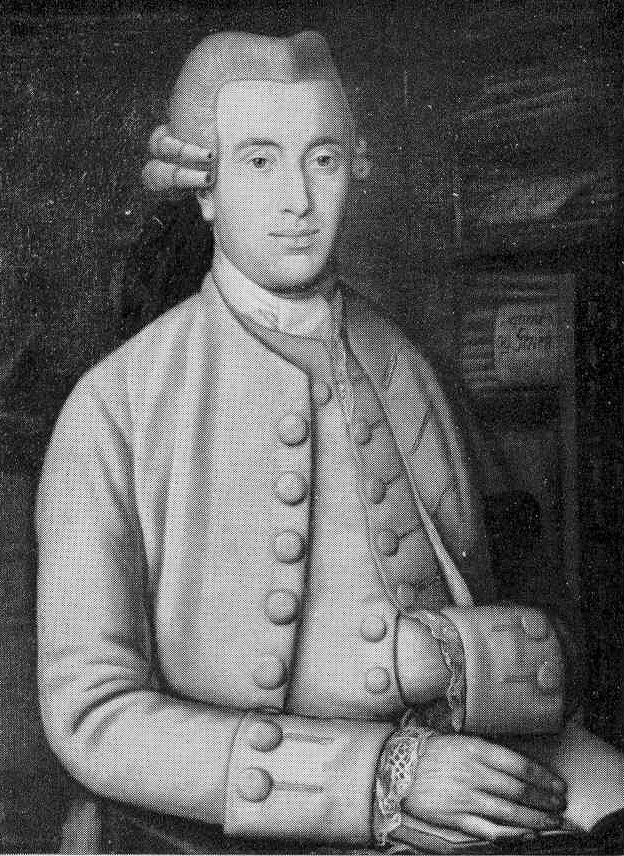
Andreas Ewald Meinert

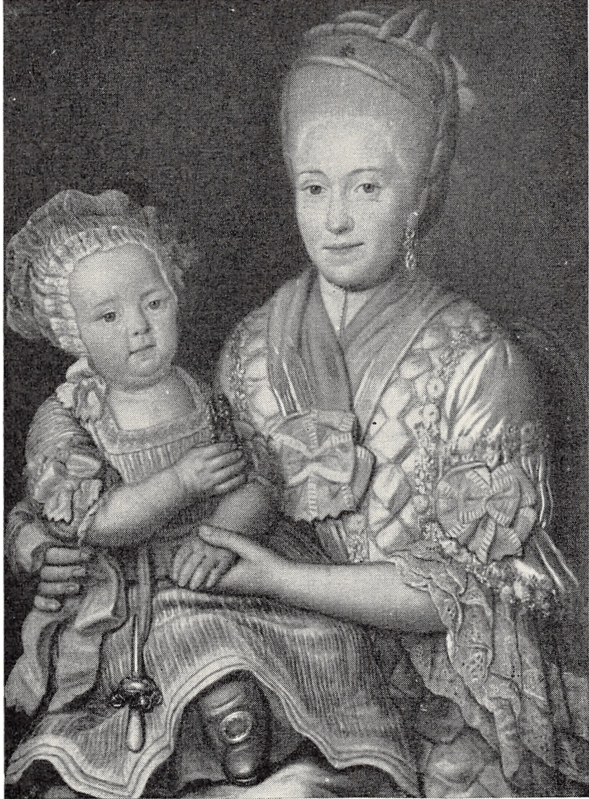
Maren Kirstine Meinert, Noe

The property was home to 25 residents in three households at the 1801 census. Andreas Ewald Meinert, a renteskriver, resided in the building with his wife Marie Kirstine Meinert, their five children (aged nine to 23), a housekeeper, a male servant and two maids. Carsten Carstensen, a bookkeeper, resided in the building with his eight-year-old daughter Mariane Charlotte Carstensdatter, a female cook and a maid. Rasmus Jensen, sugar master at the sugar refinery, resided in the building with his Christiane Frederikke Jensen, a female cook and seven workmen.

The property was listed as No. 45 in the new cadastre of 1806.

=== 1740–1900 ===
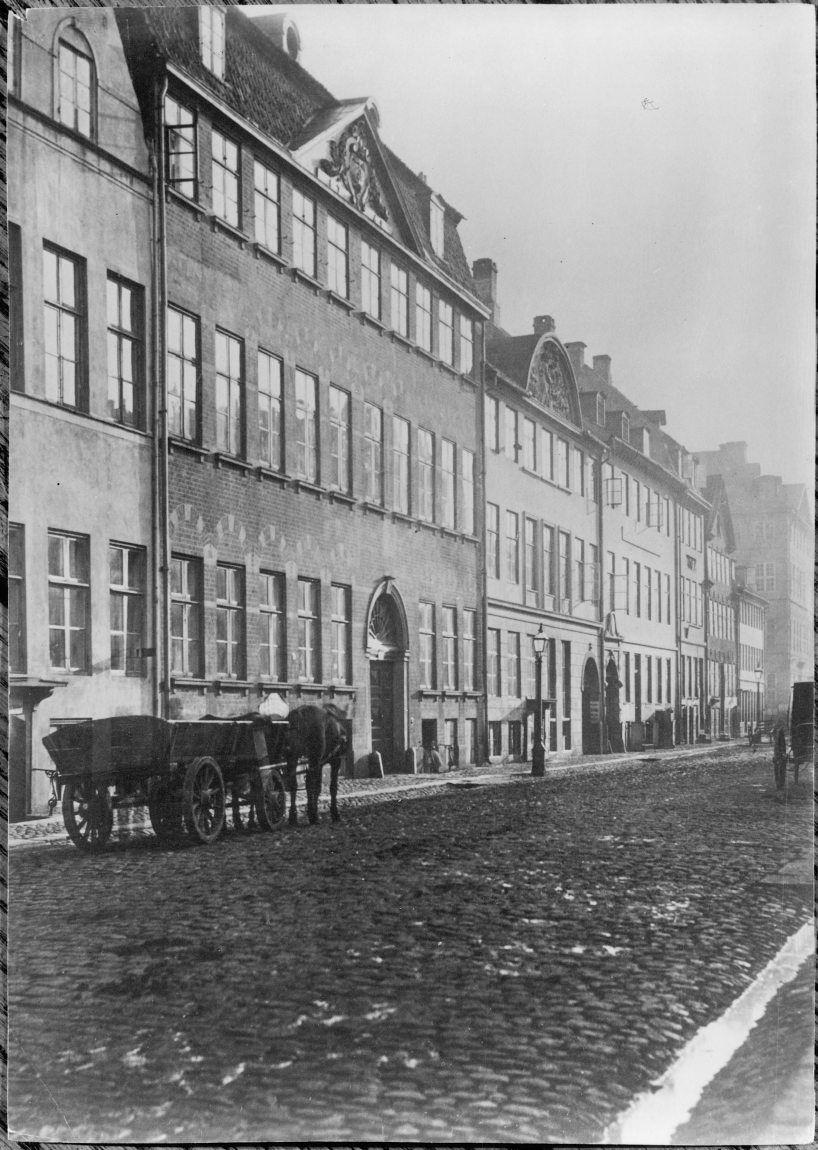
The Behagen House in the 1870s..

The property was home to 25 residents in two households at the 1840 census. Johannes Henrik Hedemann, a merchant (grosserer), resided on the ground floor with his wife Dorothea Margrethe Hedeman and five employees. Joh. St. Brandt, another merchant (grosserer), resided on the first floor with his nine children (aged nine to 30), three employees and a housekeeper. Two male servants and three maids resided on the third floor.

Later notable residents include supreme court attorney and politician Orla Lehmann who lived there in 1847–1848. He was one of the fathers of the Danish Constitution of 1849. Carl Joakim Brandt, a priest, church historian and literary historian, lived on the ground floor from 1876 to 79. The painter Frants Henningsen lived on the second floor from 1890 to 1894. The philosopher and professor Harald Høffding lived on the second floor from 1906 to 1908.

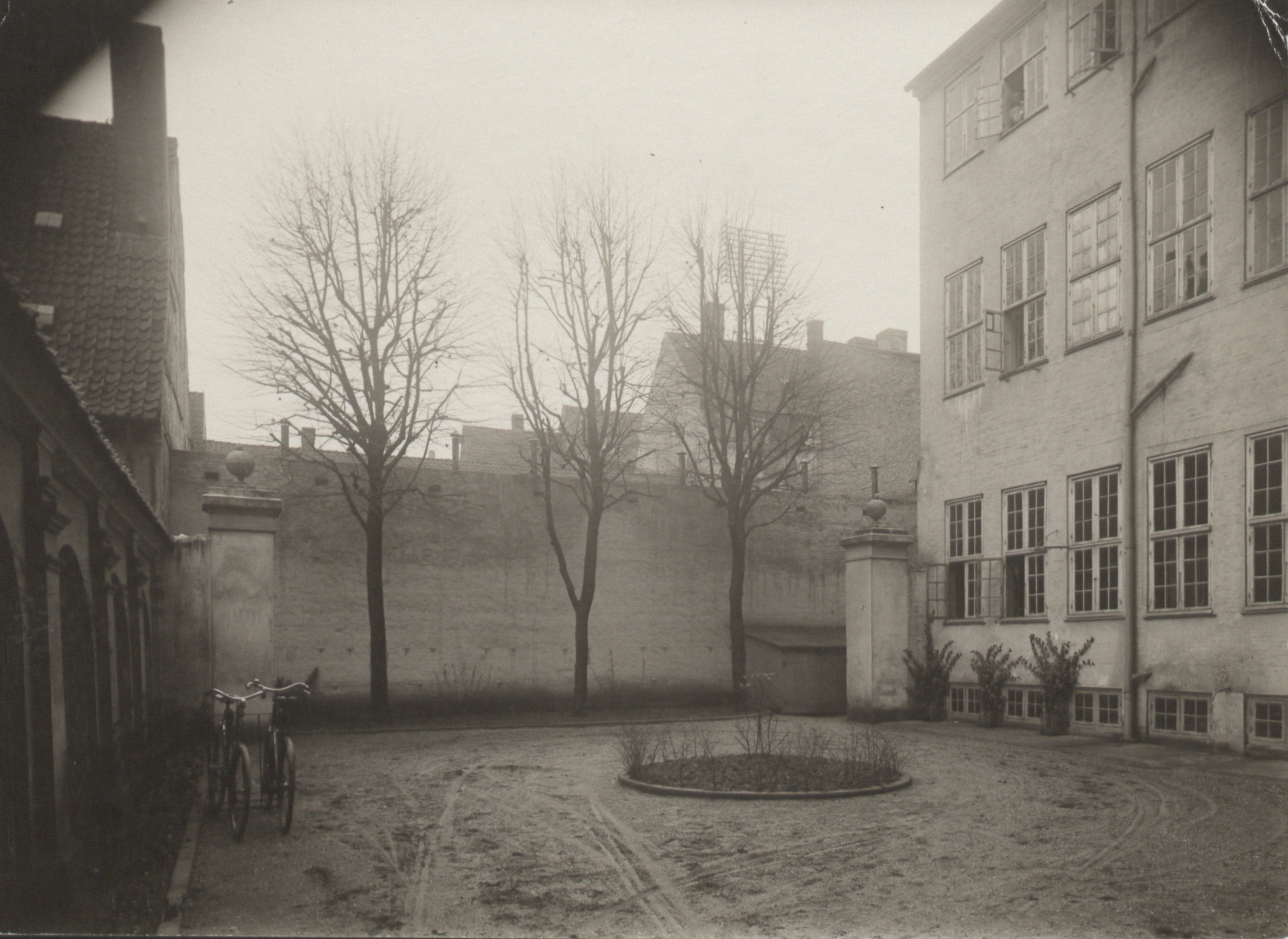
The yard photographed by Peter Elfelt in 1912 with the side wing visible to the right.

The property was home to 32 residents in four households at the 1850 census. August Seydal, a merchant (grosserer), resided on the ground floor with his wife Sira Helsted, lodger Peter Petersen (merchant, grosserer) and one maid. Hans Peter Prior, another merchant (grosserer), resided on the first floor with his wife Regine Schmidt, their six children (aged two to 18), a 27-year-old son from his first marriage, three clerks and two maids. Thora Brandt født Plugemacher, a widow, resided on the second floor with her three children (aged three to nine), her father Gottfried Plugemacher, a lodger, two maids and a coachman. Carl August Hemeche, a workman, resided in the basement with his wife Johanne Bruyn and their three children (aged two to nine).

Prior had lived in the building since 1848. He bought the Prior House in Bredgade in 1850.

=== 20th century ===
The property belonged to the jurist Ingvar Smidt Bertjelsen in 100.

== Architecture ==
The Neoclassical townhouse seen today is 10 bays wide and consists of three storeys, a cellar and a mansard roof with black-glazed tiles. The central triangular pediment above the third floor features a cartouche with the letter 'B' (for Behagen) and the year '1769'.

The building contains a mural from about 1771 featuring a royal hunting scene. It depicts Christian VII accompanied by Johann Friedrich Struensee and Queen Caroline Matilda during a par force hunt in what is believed to be an imaginary setting although it has been speculated that Selsø lake and manor house may have served as an inspiration. The artist is unknown. Christian VII revived par force hunting in August 1767 but the practice was abolished in 1777.

== Gallery ==
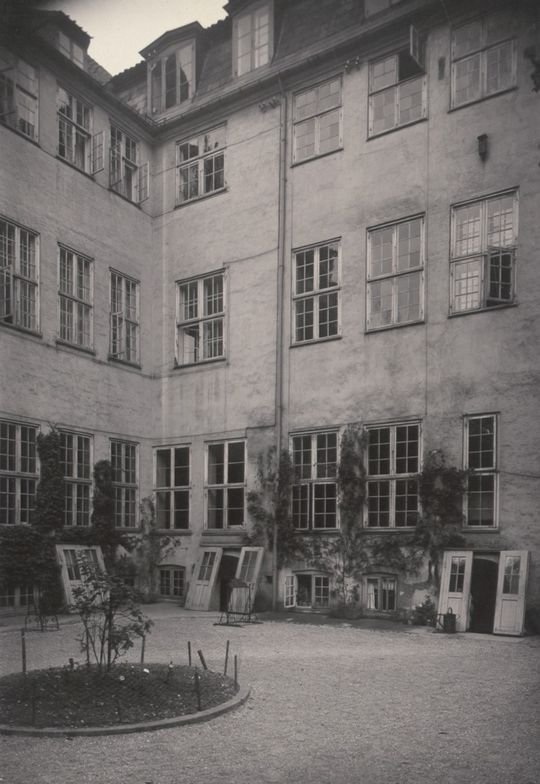
The yard in the 1910s

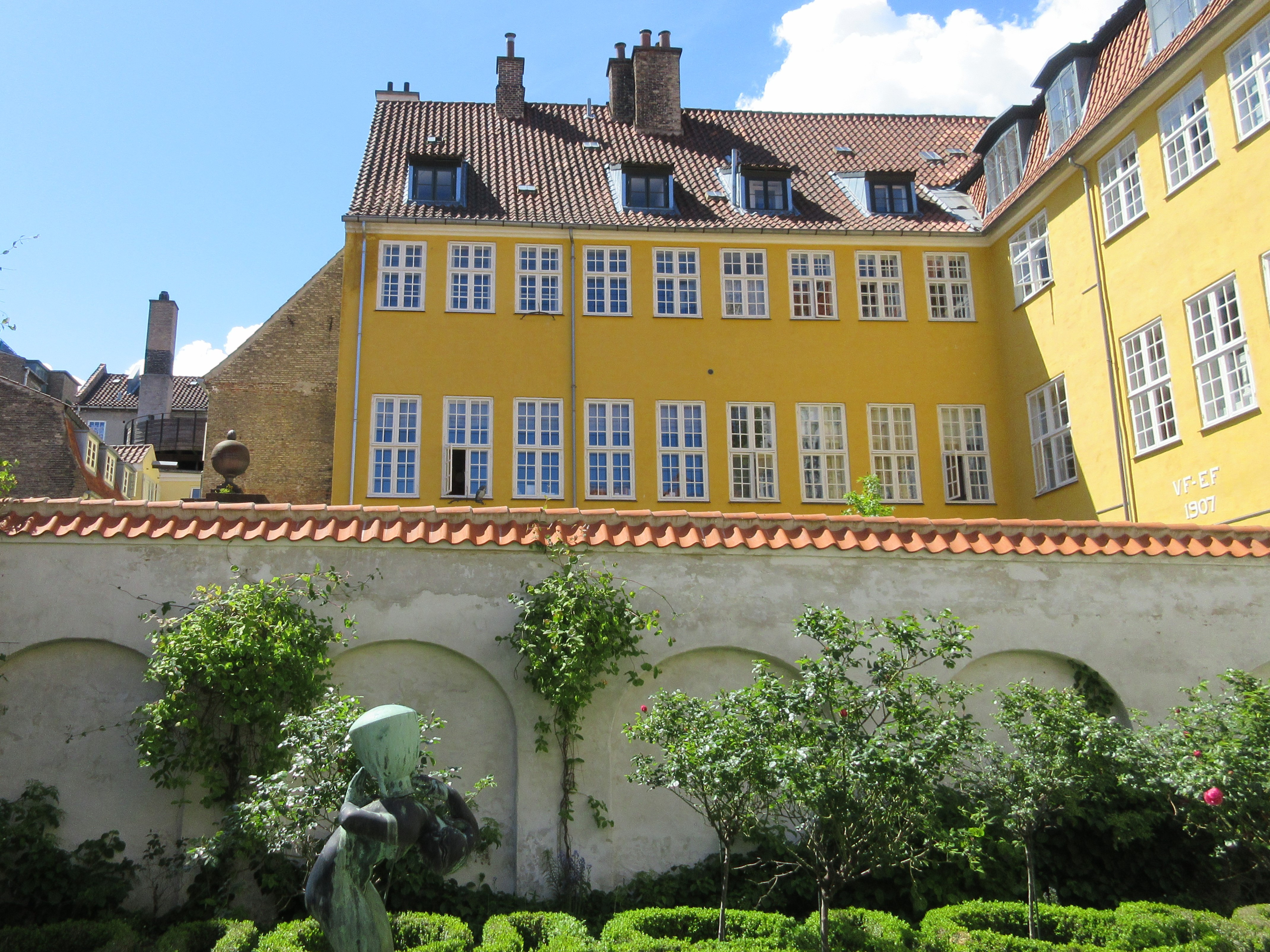
The side wing seen across the wall towards the courtyard of No. 28

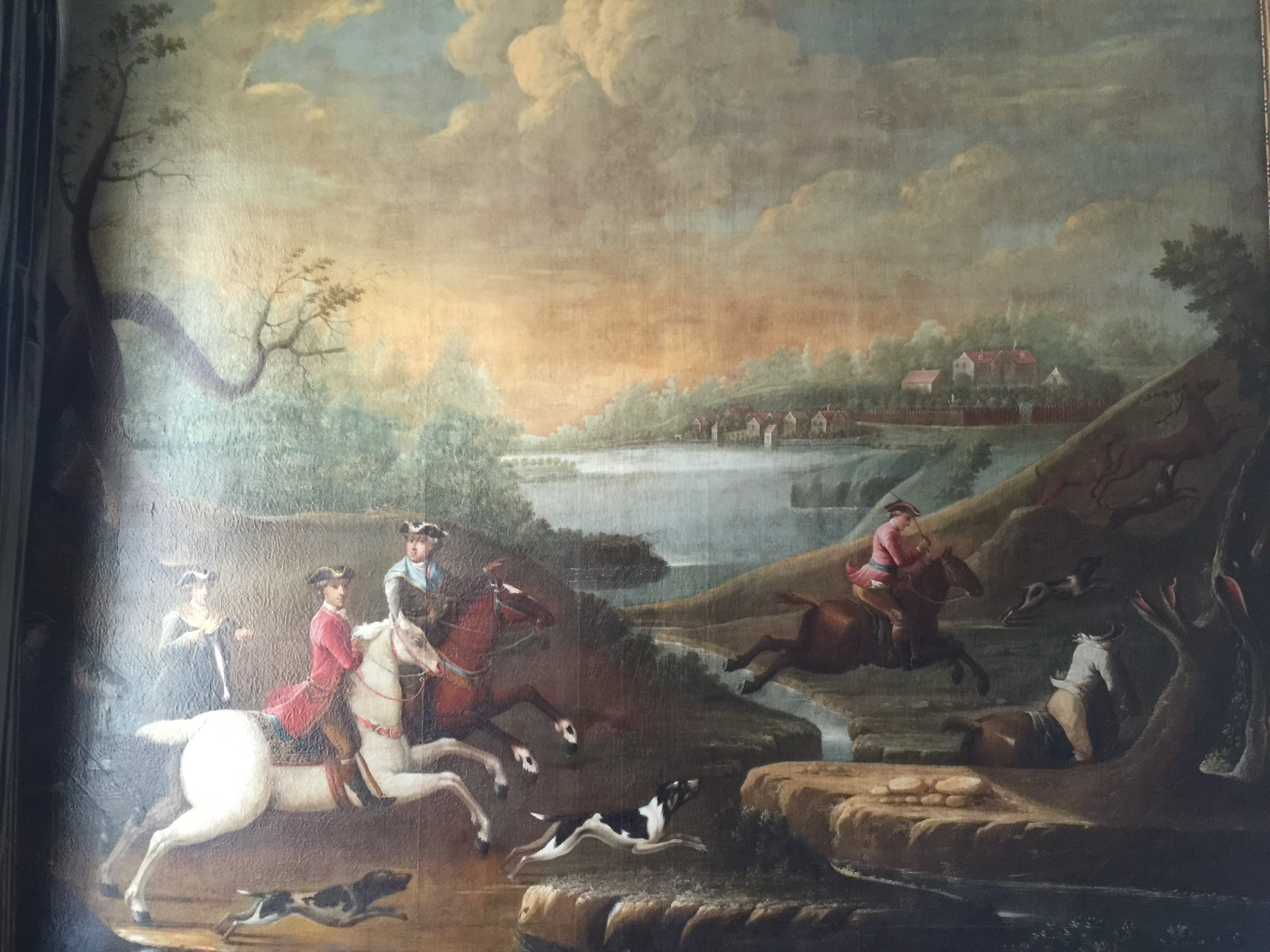
The mural of Christian VII during a par force hunt
