= Krøyers Plads =

Waterfront mixed-use development in central Copenhagen, Denmark

Coordinates: 55.6769°N 12.5953°E

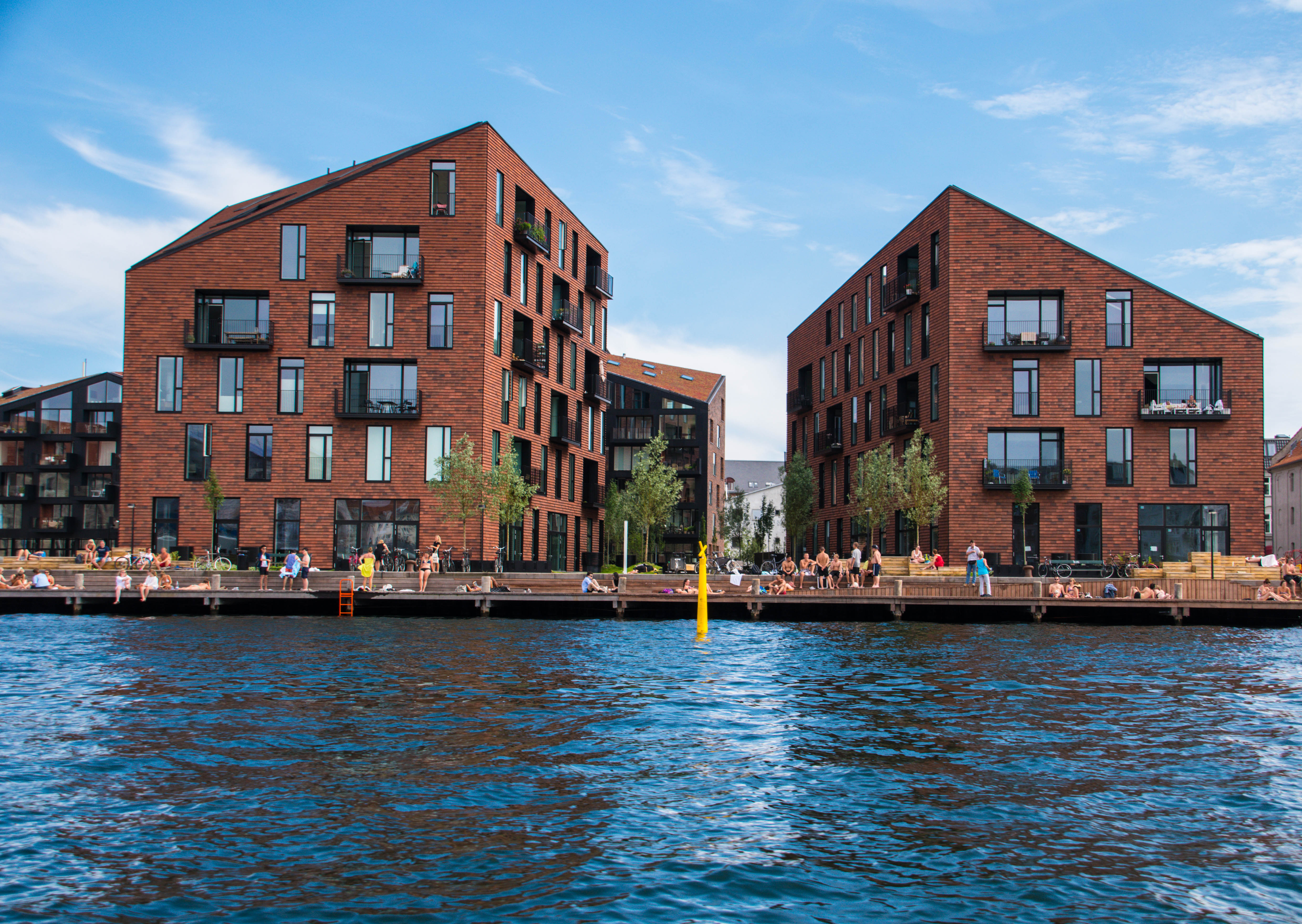
Krøyers Plads

Krøyers Plads is a waterfront mixed-use development in the Christianshavn neighbourhood of central Copenhagen, Denmark. It is located between Wilders Plads to the south and Grønlandske Handels Plads to the north. The current buildings were completed in 2016, and are inspired by the historic warehouses that dominate the waterfront.

== History ==
Krøyers Plads is part of an area that was reclaimed by Andreas Bjørn for use as a shipyard in the 1750s. The northern part of the area was acquired by the Royal Greenland Trade Department in the 1790s and became known as Grønlandske Handels Plads. The southern part of the area was purchased by the captain and merchant Hans Krøyer in 1802.

The site was reacquired by the Royal Greenland Trade Department in 1938. The ships were moved to Aalborg in the 1970s. The deserted area was in 1998 ceded to the new state-owned property company Freja Ejendomme. In July 2001, it was converted into am urban beach setting under the name Lufthastellet with the use of 17 t of sand from Råbjerg Mile.

In February 2003, an invited architectural competition was launched for the area. It was won by Erick van Egeraat. In April 2004, NCC acquired Krøyers Plads with the intention of realizing Egeraat's winning proposal. The plans resulted in comprehensive complaints from neighbours and interest organisations. In March 2005, the district plan proposal was rejected by the City Council. A new masterplan for the area was subsequently commissioned from a team consisting of Bjarke Ingels Group, Henning Larsen Architects and Kim Utzon Architects. In August 2005, NCC sold the project to Carlyle Group. The new plan for the area was presented in May 2006, but was again rejected by City Hall. The project was put on hold as a result of the financial crisis.

In 2010, NXX reacquired the site. A new plan for the area was subsequently created by Vilhelm Lauritzen Arkitekter, Cobe and GHB Landskabsarkitekter. It was approved in 2011 and construction finally began in the autumn of 2012. The last phase of the project was completed in 2016.

== Notable residents ==
Present and former owners of apartments include:

- Peter Asschenfeldt, businessman
- Michael Laudrup, footballer
