= The Silo (Copenhagen) =

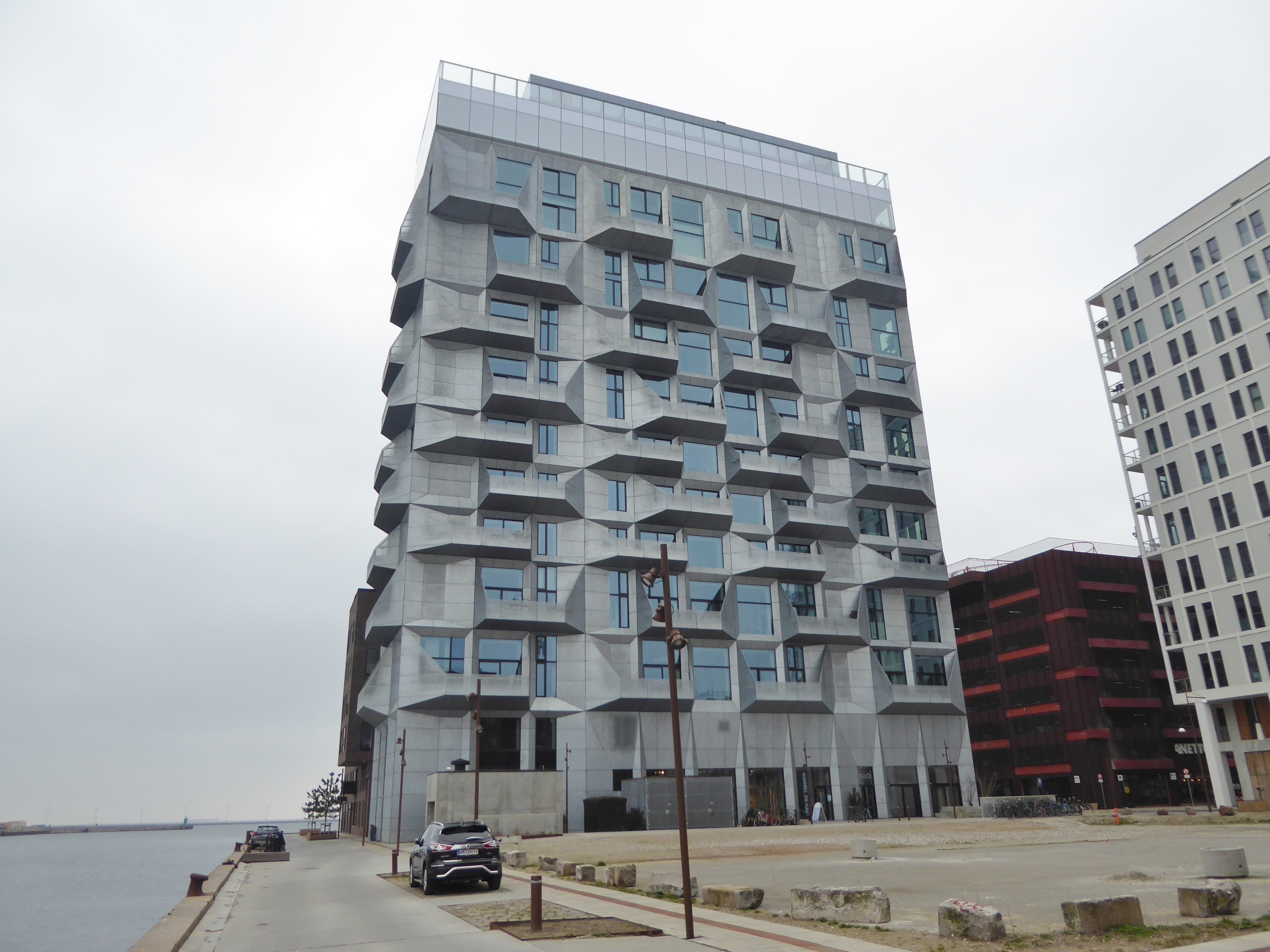
- The Silo in 2017
- Interactive map of the The Silo area

General information
- Status: Completed
- Type: Apartment
- Location: Fortkaj 30, Copenhagen, Denmark
- Coordinates: 55°42′29.646″N 12°35′52.609″E
- Construction started: 2015
- Completed: May 2017

Height
- Roof: 65 m (213 ft)

Technical details
- Floor count: 17

Design and construction
- Architect: Cobe
- Developer: NRE Denmark; UNIONKUL HOLDING A/S
- Structural engineer: Balslev and Wessberg
- Main contractor: NRE Denmark

References
- CTBUH

The Silo is a 65-meter (213 foot) apartment building converted from a former grain silo located in Nordhavn, Copenhagen, Denmark. The 17-storey structure was completed in May 2017 and houses 39 apartments, a restaurant, and lookout platform. The building was designed by the Copenhagen-based architectural firm Cobe.

The building forms part of the wider redevelopment of Copenhagen’s Nordhavnen district. Since 2008, Cobe has been responsible for the urban planning, which is estimated to take 40 to 50 years and expand the district to up to 3.5 million square meters.

== Background ==
The Silo is a part of the transformation of Copenhagen's Nordhaven (meaning North Harbour) from an industrial development into a new city district. Construction required the former grain silo's concrete facade to be upgraded and recladded. The interior was preserved as much as possible. The apartments housed in the Silo range from 106m² to 401m² in size, with floor heights up to 7 meters, and include floor-to-ceiling windows and balconies. The penthouse apartment is one of the country's most expensive apartments.

The Silo has won numerous design and architectural awards, including the Council on Tall Buildings and Urban Habitat 2018 Best Tall Building Europe, the Civic Trust Awards, and the Azure AZ Awards 2018 for design of the multi-storey residential building. In September 2018, the Silo was awarded the Renoverprisen for best renovation project.
