= Just Fabritius =

Danish merchant

Gotthilf Just Fabritius (1 September 1703 – 7 May 1766) was a Danish merchant.

== Early life ==
Just Fabritius was born in Copenhagen to German immigrants. His father was a wine merchant.

=== Career ===
He established his own trading house and had close ties to the state, both under the reign of Christian VI and Frederik V. He participated with great success in the expeditions to China and India which were planned and supported by Bernstorff on behalf of the state. He was one of the founders of Kurantbanken in 1736 and for a while served as its director. He became part of the board of directors of the Danish Africa Company in 1755. He took part in the preparations for the expedition led by Verrayon to the Levant with the aim of opening a new, lucrative market. The expedition was a failure but Fabritius avoided losses.

Fabritius was appointed to Agent in 1743. In 1746, the king gifted him the Christiansholm estate north of Copenhagen. He later established a calico textile manufactory at the site. He was appointed to etatsråd in 1751.

In 1745, he took part in Johan Frederik Classen's development of an establishment of a cannon and munitions factory at Frederiksværk, contributing mainly with contacts and funding.

In 1757, he was sent to Paris to negotiate loans for the Danish state and, in 1760–1761, he negotiated a substantial loan for the Danish state in Genoa.

== Personal life ==
He married Elisabeth Mariane de Bruguier. One of their daughters, Charlotte Fabritius, married Peter van Hemert. Another daughter, Anna Susanne Fabritius (1737–1792), married Johann Schultze.

Just Fabritius owned the country house Sølyst from 1753 to 1756. He died on 7 May 1766 in Copenhagen and is buried at the Cemetery of Holmen.
