= Johan Christian Conradi =

Johan Christian Conradi (1709 – 30 September 1779) was a German born, Danish master builder, contractor and architect.

== Early life and education ==
Conradi was born at Gotha in the Sazon duchy of Saxe-Gotha. He moved to Denmark in 1739 where he was accepted into the masons' guild in 1740.

== Work as builder ==
In the beginning of his career, Conradi worked as a mason and builder. His first major work as such was Ledreborg (1743–45). In the late 1740s he began routinely working for Niels Eigtved, architect to the Royal Court, executing projects such as the first Royal Danish Theatre at Kongens Nytorv (1748–49, demolished in 1874), Danish Asia Company's warehouse at Asiatisk Plads (1748–50), Christian's Church (1755-64) and the Lindencrone Mansion in Bredgade (1751). Later works include Almindelig Hospital in Amaliegade which he completed to designs by Nicolas-Henri Jardin in 1760 (demolished in 1892) and maintenance work both on Kongens Bryghus and Børsen (1779).

== Career as architect ==
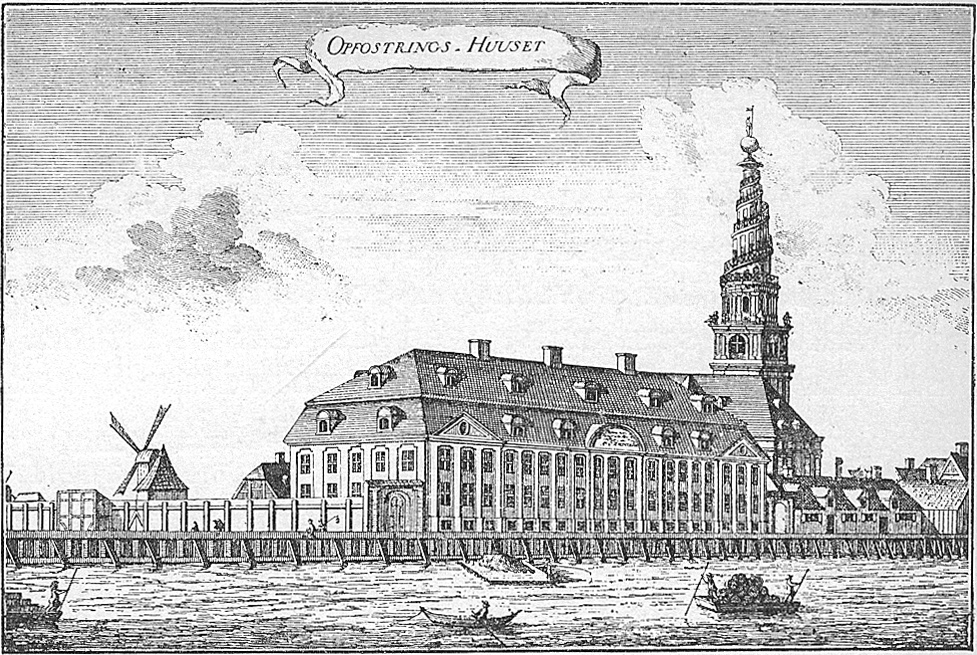
Royal Naval Hospice as it appeared prior to later alterations and expansion

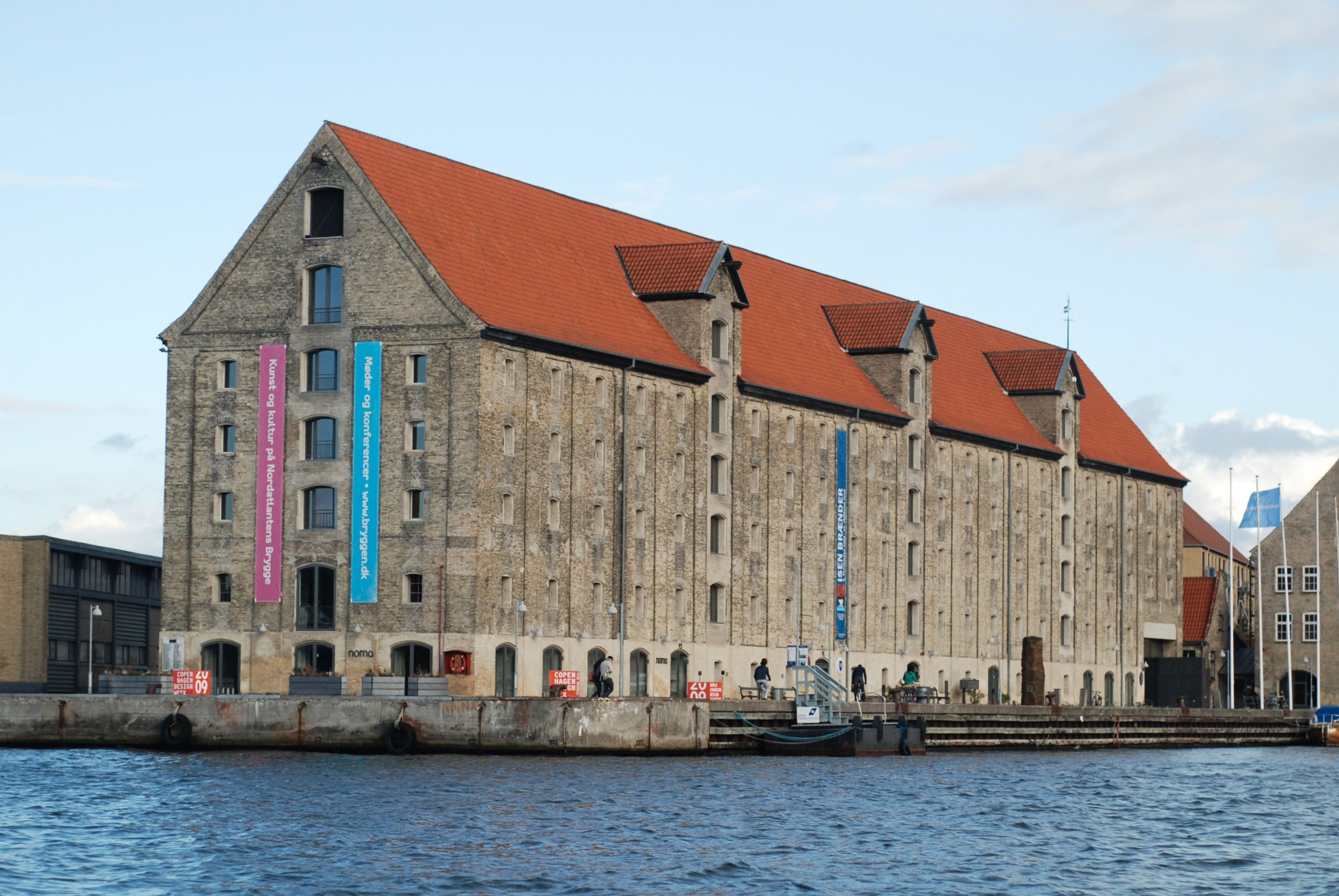
Royal Greenland's former warehouse, now North Atlantic House

From about 1750, Conradi increasingly also worked as an architect, designing the buildings that he built.

Many of Conradi's works are found in the Christianshavn neighbourhood. These include two houses at 50–52 Prinsessegade (1750), the Royal Naval Hospice, now known as Søkvæsthuset (1753–55, later altered and expanded), the Wilder Warehouse at Wilders Plads (1762–63) and Royal Greenland's warehouse at Grøndlandske Handels Palds (now North Atlantic House from 1764. His own house at Christianshavn Canal (29 Overgaden neden Vandet, 1752) and his rectory for Christian's Church have both been demolished.

In Frederiksstaden, Conradi has built the house on the corner of Amaliegade (No. 19) and Fredericiagade (No. 2).

Among the buildings which are attributed to Conradi are Sæbygård in the west of Zealand (1740s, demolished), Christiansholm at Klampenborg (c. 1748), Kaalund Convent (originally a farm under Kalundborg Castle, 1751–52), 40–42 Amaliegade in Copenhagen (1756–60) and Store Godthåb in Frederiksberg (1770).

== Other pursuits ==
In 1783, Conradi acquired the property Bakkegården in Valby with plans to run it as an inn. He expanded the building (from then on known as Gammel Bakkehus, "Old Hill House") and built a new house (Ny Bakkehus, "New Hill House", now demolished) on a neighbouring site in 1764. In 1766 he obtained a royal privilege to open the inn. It was sold at auction when he went bankrupt in 1777 and is now the site of the cultural museum Bakkehusmuseet.
