= Joost van Hemert =

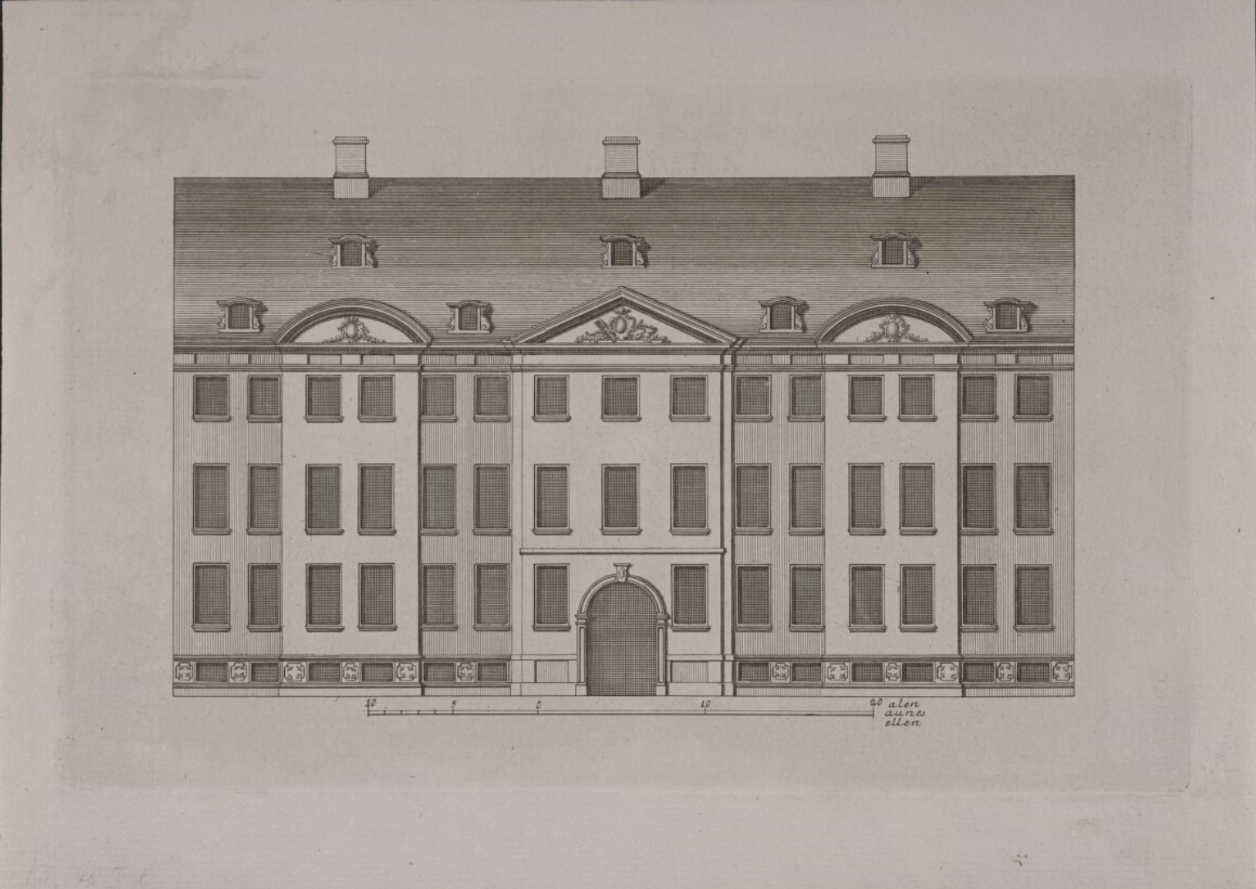
Rendering of Joost van Hemert's house on Købmagergade in Copenhagen

Joost van Hemert (22 June 1696 – 15 June 1775) was a Danish merchant, financier and shipowner. His trading house, Joost van H. & Sønner, founded circa 1740, was later continued by his son Peter van Hemert.

== Early life ==
Joost van Hemert was born in Copenhagen, the son of wine merchant Peter van Hemert (1648–1703) and Susanne Margrethe v. Tangen (died 1703). The family was originally from the Netherlands and belonged to the city's German Reformed congregation.

== Career ==
Hemert was granted citizenship as a merchant in 1728. In circa 1740, he founded his own trading house, which from 1765 traded under the name Joost van H. & Sønner. He took over the Royal Danish Silk Manufactury in Copenhagen in 1753.

His company developed into one of the leading trading houses in the city. He was also active as a financier, benefiting from good connections at the Court. He was appointed to royal agent in 1745 and etatsråd in 1751.

Together with Just Fabritius he was a driving force behind the establishment of the short-lived Danish Africa Company and served as its director from 1755 to 1767. He was director of the Danish Asiatic Company from 1743–1752, the Danish West Indies Company from 1747–1754 and the General Trading Company from 1757–1769. He was also appointed director of Kurantbanken when it was established in 1736.

Hemert was one of several merchants Johann Friedrich Struensee consulted in 1770 in connection with his work for more liberal conditions for the business community. In his response, Hemert advocated the establishment of a sort of Free port.

=== Ships ===
- 1758 – ST. THOMAS (ID=15040), owned jointly with Pelt
- 1762 – ELISABETH (ID=8773), purchased in Bergen and owned jointly with Tyberg
- 1781 – CONCORDIA (ID=11133), purchased in Amsterdam
- 1781 – PRINSESSE SOPHIA FREDERICA (ID=9429), owned until 1790
- 1782 – ELISABETH (ID=8785), purchased in Oostende
- 1782 – FREDERIKSDAL (ID=10181), owned by Peter v.H. and Gysbert Behagen
- 1782 – KRONPRINS FREDERIK (ID=8910), purchased in England, sold in 1793 to Norway
- 1782 – GREV REVENTLOW (ID=10040), purchased with several partners
- 1784 – ENIGHEDEN (ID=9856), built for the company
- 1803 – ELISABETH (ID=8804), purchased

== Personal life ==
Joost van Hemert married twice, He first married Cornelia Decker (31 March 1709 – 15 November 1731) on 6 September 1725 in the Reformed Church in Copenhagen. He then married, for a second time, Petronelle Elisabeth Mestecker (13 September 1703 – 19 February 1778) on 14 October 1732 in Hamburg. She was the widow of Anthony Behagen (1687–1727), a wine merchant from Hamburg, and brought a son, Gysbert Behagen, into the marriage. He and Petronelle had at least two children: Peter and Susanne Marie. Their daughter Susanne Marie married naval officer Antoine-Nicolas le Sage de Fontenay in 1758.

Joost van Hemert owned a large house in Købmagergade (present day No. 44) as well as the country house Frederiksdal Lyststed (now Tusculum) on the north side of Bagsværd Lake. He had a large collection of curiosities. He died on 15 June 1775 and is buried in the German Reformed Church. His two sons continued the company. It closed in the 1910s.
