= Cobe (architectural firm) =

Danish architectural firm

- Type: Architectural Practice
- Industry: Architecture, urbanism, interior design, landscape design, product design, research and development
- Founded: 2006
- Headquarters: Copenhagen
- Key people: Dan Stubbergaard (founder and architect)
- Number of employees: 150+
- Website: cobe.dk

Cobe is a Copenhagen-based architectural firm owned and managed by architect Dan Stubbergaard. As of 2020, the office has 150 employees and is involved in a large number of projects throughout Europe and North America within urban planning, architecture, landscape architecture, and interior design.

== History ==
Cobe was founded by Dan Stubbergaard in 2006 in Copenhagen, where he and his studio have since been involved with more than 200 projects in the city within urban planning, architecture, and landscape architecture. Among the firm's projects are Nørreport Station, The Silo, Israels Plads, Krøyers Plads, Køge Nord Station and the development of Papirøen (Paper Island) in Copenhagen.

== The Studio ==
Since 2018, Cobe's studio has been located in the new city district of Nordhavn in Copenhagen, for which the drawing office also won the master plan competition in 2008.

== Selected completed projects ==
- 2023: Europahafenkopf, Bremen, DE
- 2019: Frederiksberg Allé 41, Copenhagen, DK
- 2019: Alfred Nobels Bro, Copenhagen, DK
- 2019: Designmuseum Denmark, Copenhagen, DK
- 2019: Roskilde Festival Folk High School, Roskilde, DK
- 2019: Ultra-Fast Charging Stations for Electric Cars, Fredericia, DK
- 2019: Køge Nord Station, Køge, DK
- 2019: Karen Blixens Plads, Copenhagen, DK
- 2018: Adidas HalfTime, Herzogenaurauch, DE
- 2018: Tingbjerg Culture House and Library, Copenhagen, DK
- 2017: The Silo, Copenhagen, DK
- 2017: Red Cross Volunteer House, Copenhagen, DK
- 2017: Kids' City, Copenhagen, DK
- 2017: Landgangen, Esbjerg, DK
- 2016: Ragnarock - Museum for Pop, Rock and Youth Culture, Roskilde, DK
- 2015: Krøyers Plads, Copenhagen, DK
- 2015: Nørreport Station, Copenhagen, DK
- 2015: Frederiksvej Kindergarten, Frederiksberg, Copenhagen, DK
- 2014: Israels Plads, Copenhagen, DK,
- 2014: Forfatterhuset Kindergarten, Copenhagen, DK
- 2013: Porsgrunn Maritime Museum, Porsgrunn, NO
- 2012: The Danish Pavilion for Expo 2012, Yeosu, South Korea
- 2012: Vester Voldgade, Copenhagen, DK
- 2011: The Library, Copenhagen, DK
- 2009: Taastrup Theatre, Taastrup, DK

== Selected projects under construction (completion year) ==
- Paper Island, København, DK, (2023)
- The Tip of Redmolen, Nordhavn, DK, (2022)
- Place Schuman, Bruxelles, BE (2022)
- West Don Lands, Toronto, CA (2022)
- Kronløb Island, Copenhagen, DK (2023)
- The Opera Park, Copenhagen, DK (2023)
- ESS - European Spallation Source, Lund, SE, (2013–2025)
- Bremerhaven Harbour Masterplan, Bremerhaven. Germany

== Selected exhibitions (exhibition year) ==
- 2020: Our Urban Living Room, Aedes, Berlin, DE
- 2018: Our Urban Living Room, Laituri, Helsinki, FI
- 2016: Our Urban Living Room, DAC – the Danish Architecture Center, Copenhagen, DK

== Selected publications (publication year) ==
- 2018: The Silo, Strandberg Publishing
- 2016: Our Urban Living Room, Arvinius+Orfeus Publishing

== Selected awards ==
- 2020: MIPIM Award Finalist – Best Industrial & Logistics Development
- 2020: Archdaily Building of the Year Award
- 2020 German Design Award
- 2020: Dezeen Landscape Award
- 2019: Dezeen Awards Finalist
- 2019: Architizer A+ Awards Jury Winner
- 2019: Fast Company's Innovation by Design Award Honoree
- 2019: Danish Design Award Finalist
- 2019: IABSE Denmark's Structure Award
- 2019: Red Dot Communication & Brands Award
- 2018: Civic Trust Award
- 2018: MIPIM Award Finalist – Best Refurbished Building
- 2018: CTBUH Awards – Best Tall Building Europe
- 2018: AZ Awards – Best Residential Architecture
- 2018: Global Galvanizers Award
- 2018: RENOVER Prisen
- 2018: Architizer Project of the Year Award A+ Award
- 2018: German Design Award
- 2018: Building Awards – The Infrastructure Award
- 2017: German Design Award
- 2017: Danish Landscape Award
- 2017: ArchDaily Building of the Year Award
- 2017: Wallpaper*Design Award
- 2017: Architizer A+ Awards
- 2017: Green Good Design Award
- 2018, 2017, 2016, 2014, 2011: Copenhagen Award for Architecture
- 2017: Landezine International Landscape Award
- 2016: Danish Lighting Award
- 2016: WAN Transport Award
- 2016: Eckersberg Royal Medal
- 2016: European Prize for Urban Public Space
- 2016, 2015, 2014, 2013, 2012: Børsen Gazelle Award
- 2015: Iconic Award – Visionary Architecture
- 2015: MIPIM Award Finalist – Best Futura Project
- 2015: Dreyer's Foundation Grand Prize of Honor
- 2013: Byggeskikprisen
- 2012: MIPIM Award – Best Refurbished Building
- 2012: Nykredit's Architecture Prize
- 2007: Nykredit's Motivation Award
- 2006: The Golden Lion at the Venice Biennale of Architecture
