= North Atlantic House =

Culture centre in Copenhagen, Denmark

Coordinates: 55.6777°N 12.5966°E

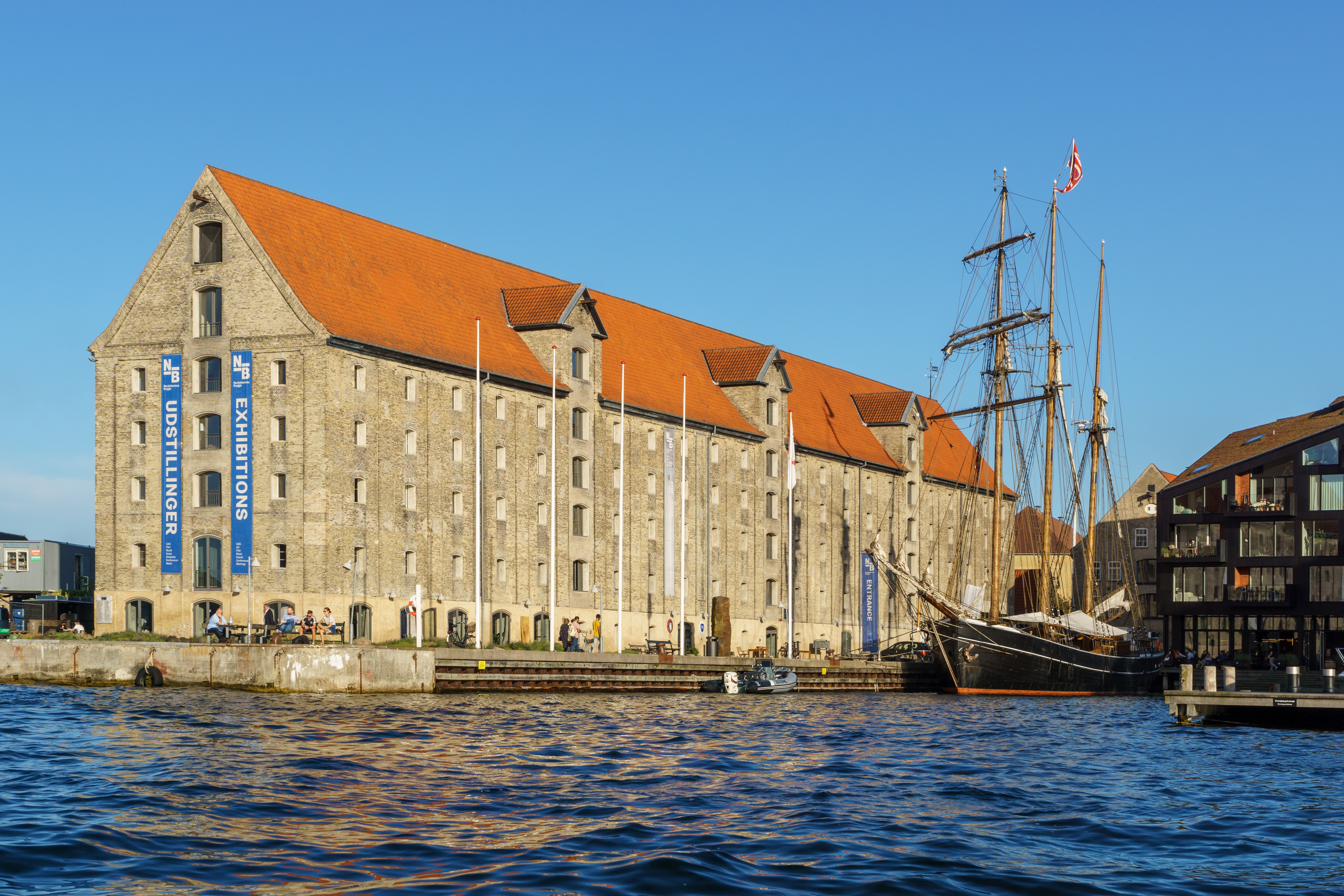
North Atlantic House, 2017

North Atlantic House (Danish: Nordatlantisk Hus) is a cultural centre located on the harbour front in Copenhagen, Denmark, dedicated to preserve, promote and communicate culture and art from the North Atlantic area. It is made as a cooperation between Denmark, Iceland, Greenland and the Faroe Islands and includes three galleries as well as conference facilities. The centre also houses the Icelandic embassy and the permanent representations of Greenland and the Faroe Islands, as well as some commercial activities and enterprises related to the area.

== Building ==
The centre is located in an old maritime warehouse from 1767 by the harbourfront in the Christianshavn neighbourhood of central Copenhagen.

The building is situated by the Greenlandic Trading Square (Danish: Grønlandske Handelsplads), which, for 200 years, was a centre for trade to and from the Faroe Islands, Finnmark, Iceland, and in particular, Greenland. Dried fish, salted herring, whale oil and skins are among the goods that were stored in and around the warehouse before being sold off to European markets.

== Activities ==
The centre arranges a mixture of exhibitions, events, concerts and debates, featuring everything from contemporary art, dance, music, performances and films to lectures.
