= Gysbert Behagen =

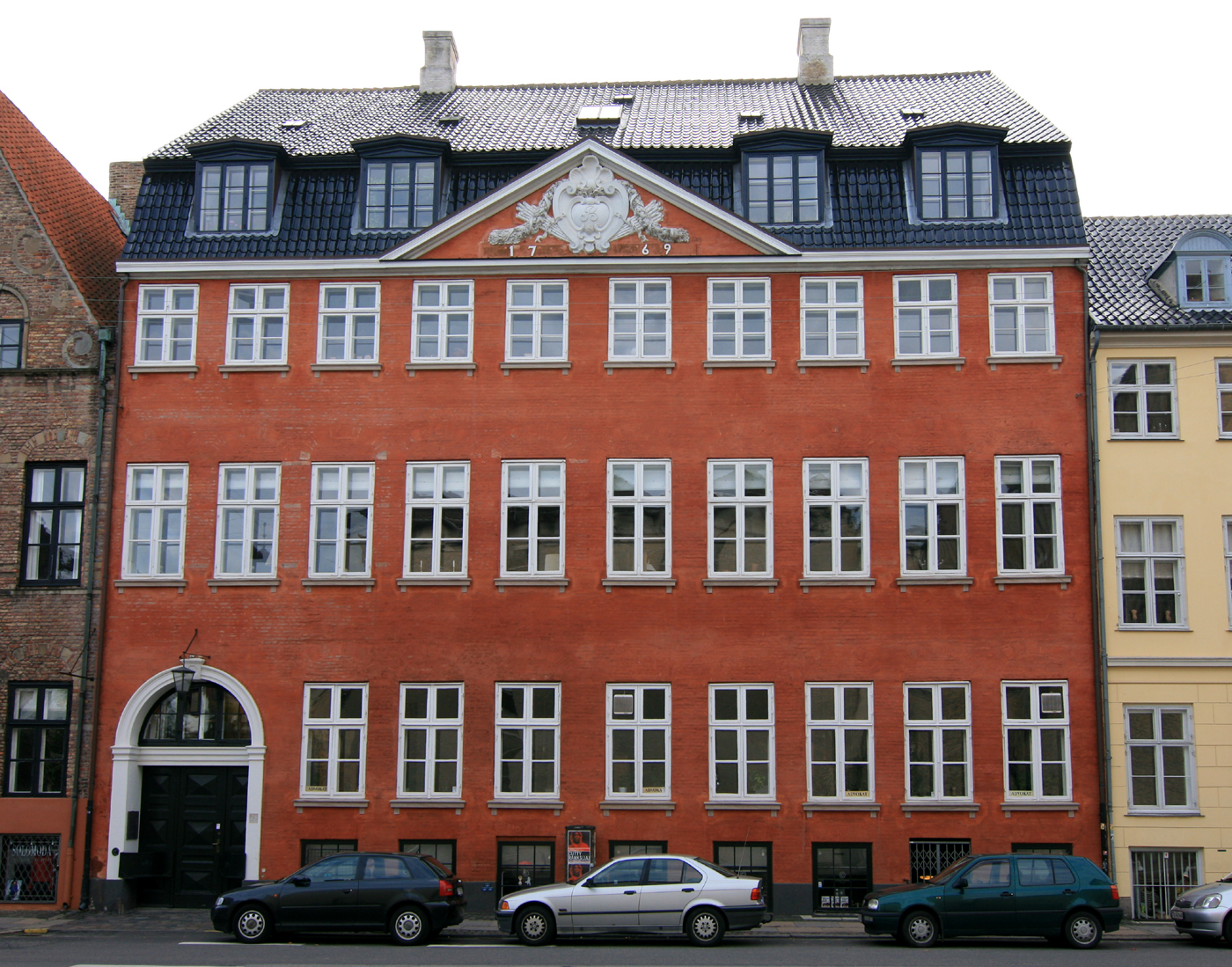
Behagen's House on Strandgade in Copenhagen

Gysbert Behagen (8 March 1725 – 17 December 1783) was a German-Danish merchant, ship owner and director of Danish Asia Company. His home at Strandgade 26 in the Christianshavn neighbourhood of Copenhagen is known as Behagen's House (Danish: Behagens Gård) after him.

== Biography ==
Behagen was born in Hamburg, the son of wine merchant Anthony Behagen (1687–1727) and Petronelle Elisabeth Mestecker (1703–1778). His father died when he was two years old. His mother later moved to Copenhagen where she married the wealthy merchant Joost van Hemert in 1732. Behagen joined his step father's company. He married Elisabeth Gertrud Wasserfall on 9 April 1755 in the Reformed Church in Copenhagen.

== Career ==
Behagen became an agent and a wholesaler (grosserer) in 1760 and was also active in Kurantbanken where he held several trusted posts. In 1764, he obtained a royal licence to establish a sugar refinery at his house in Strandgade. In 1769, he became a member of the board of directors of the Danish Asia Company. When the octroi was up for renewal in 1772, many stakeholders expressed their dissatisfaction with the management and a new board was elected.

== Later life ==
In 1776, he became etatsråd and in 1782 he was ennobled with a right to use a coat of arms dating from his ancestors. He died on 17 December 1783 and is buried in the graveyard of the Reformed Church in Copenhagen.
