= Peter van Hemert =

Danish merchant

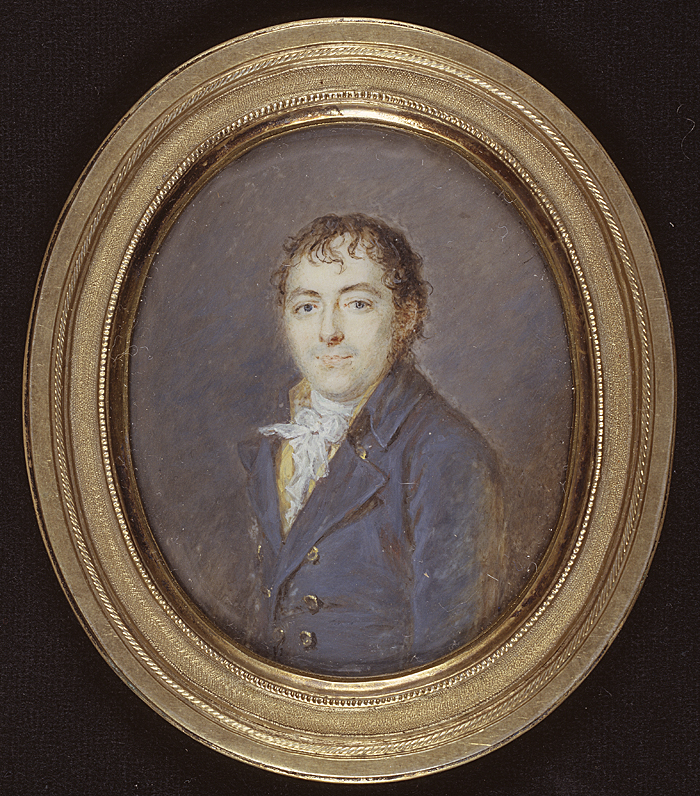
- Miniature portrait by Cornelius Høyer, c. 1800.
- Born: 29 May 1734; Copenhagen, Denmark
- Died: 20 May 1810 (aged 75); Copenhagen, Denmark
- Occupations: Businessman and shipowner

Peter van Hemert (29 May 1734 - 20 May 1810) was a Danish merchant and shipowner. His family's trading house, Joost van Hemert & S'nner, existed until 1805.

== Early life and education ==
Hemert was born in Copenhagen on 20 May 1734, the son of merchant and shipowner Joost van Hemert (1696–1775) and Petronelle Elisabeth Behagen, née Mestecker (1703–78). His mother was the widow of Anthony Behagen (1687–1727)), a wine merchant from Hamburg, and had brought a son, Gysbert Behagen, into the marriage. Peter van Hemert was educated in his father's company.

== Career ==
In 1765, Hemert was granted citizenship as a merchant. Peter van Hemert and his half-brother Gysbert Behagen were at this point made partners in their father's company, whose name was at the same event changed to Joost van Hemert & Sønner (Joost van Hemert & Sons. Peter van Hemert was also active in the Danish Asiatic Company in which he owned up to 50 shares. When trade was liberalized in 1772, he also began to trade on the Far East with his own fleet of merchant ships.

In 1776–1783:, Hemert served as one of the directors of the Danish Asiatic Company. The company was in this period hit by a scandal in which a group of high-ranking employees embezzled it for close to DKK 500,000. The outraged shareholders demanded that the directors were held accountable. The government led by Ove Høegh-Guldberg tried to calm them down but in vain. In the end, after a number of meetings and prolonged negotiations, the directors agreed to pay a certain compensation to the company. Peter van Hemert had to pay 10,000 Danish rigsdaler. His company was also hit by the economic downturn that followed the termination of the American Revolutionary War. In 1783, Hemert's trading house asked the government for a loan of 80,000 Danish rigsdaler and shortly thereafter for another loan of 200,000 Danish rigsdaler. A dismayed Guldberg forced the loans through despite the explicit protests of Joachim Otto Schack-Rathlou.

Hemert's trading house partly recovered during the economic upturn of the 1790s but it did not last long. The company was taken into bankruptcy in 1805 but Hemert died before it had been finalized.

== Property ==
Hemert bought the copper and brass works at Brede, Nymølle and Fuglevad from Povl Badstuber's bankruptcy estate but he had troubles paying down his debt. In 1784, he bought the canvas manufactory at Vodroffgård in auction but his attempts to revive the venture failed and he later had to pledge it to the government.

== Personal life ==
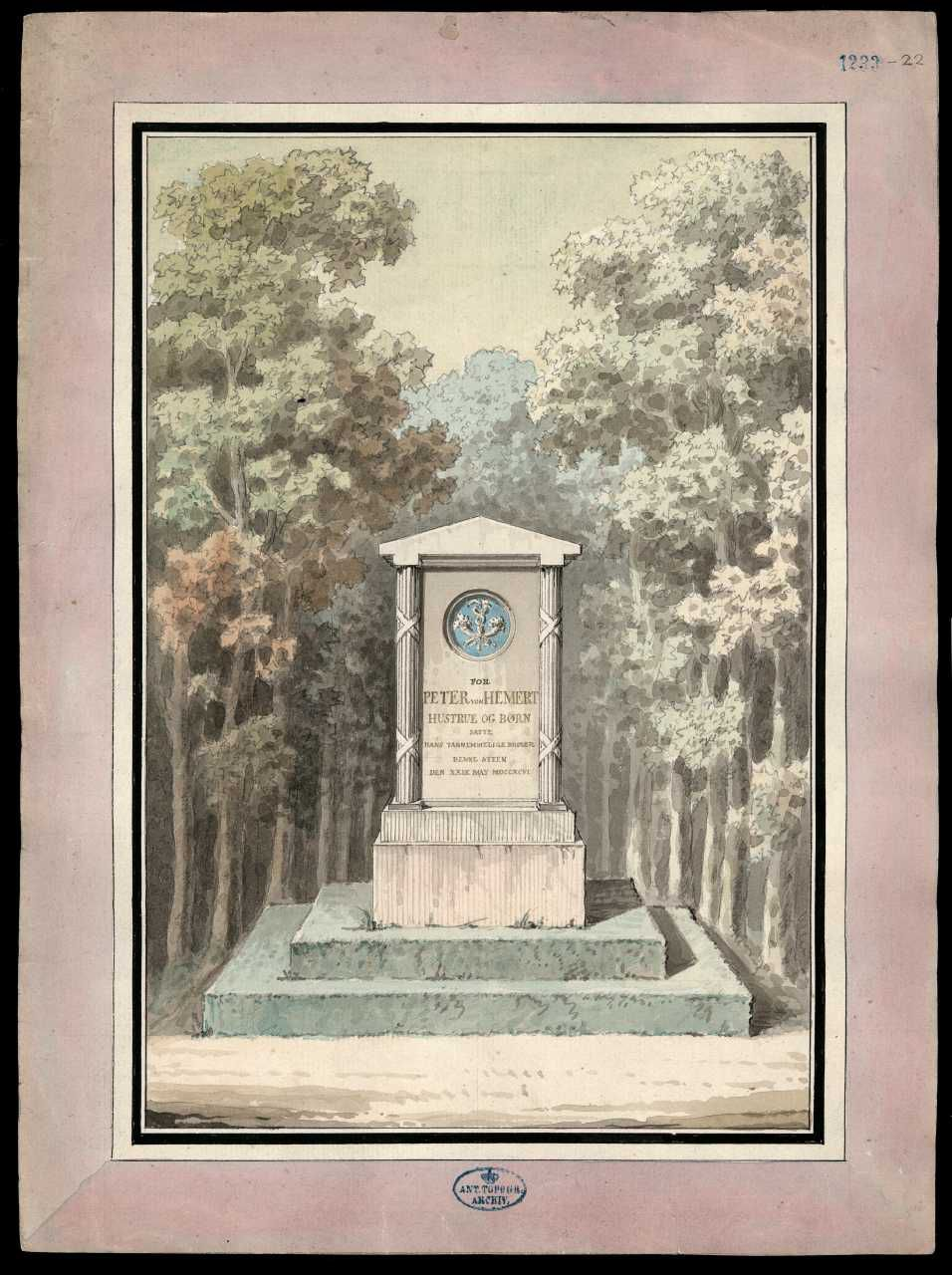
Peter van Hemmert's tomb on Assistens Cemetery

Peter van Hemert married twice. His first wife was Charlotte Fabritius, (2 December 1745 - 17 October 1766), a daughter of Just Fabritius (1703–66) and Elisabeth Mariane de Bruguier (1709–76). They were married on 3 August 1763 in the French Reformed Church. His second wife was Agathe Hooglant (5 January 1746 - 11 November 1823), a daughter of captain-lieutenant and later admiral Simon Hooglant (1712–89) and Marie Hooglandt (died 1754). They were married on 11 September 1767 in the German Reformed Church in Copenhagen.

Peter van Hemert spent the last years of his life in the house of his son Jost Johan van Hemert. He died on 20 May 1810 and was buried in Assistens Cemetery.
