= Etatsråd =

Danish and Norwegian honorary title

Etatsråd was a Danish and Norwegian title, which was conferred by the king until 1909 and entailed a third-class rank in the order of precedence, and thus the right to enroll one's daughters in Gisselfeld Convent and Vemmetofte Convent. It was awarded to civil servants and some business people.

Although literally meaning 'councilor of state', the title was purely honorary. The title could also be obtained by depositing a sum of money in the king's coffers. The same was true of other honorary titles such as justitsråd (Norwegian justisråd, 'councilor of justice') and kancelliråd (Norwegian kanselliråd, 'councilor of the chancellery').

Shipping magnate Hans Niels Andersen, for example, held the title. A particularly distinguished variant was the title gehejmeetatsråd ('privy councilor'), which was introduced in 1808 and conferred the rank of second class. In the Danish monarchy, however, the king's advisory ministers bore the title of gehejmeråd, not etatsråd, and very few gehejmeråder had a seat on the privy council.

The title was widely used during the Romantic era but was formally abolished in 1909, but several business leaders received the title later. Bank director Emil Glückstadt received it in 1911. Wholesaler William Richardt Tidemand, Holbæk, was appointed etatsråd upon King Frederik VIII's visit due to the inauguration of the city's new town hall on 11 February 1911. Printer Christian Lehmann Pagh (1 April 1912) was the last recipient of the title. The title is protected.

The wife of an etatsråd bore the title of gehejmerådinde. Marie Kofoed was the only woman to be awarded the title on her own merits, after inheriting her husband's assets and doing charitable work.
