= Købmagergade 44 =

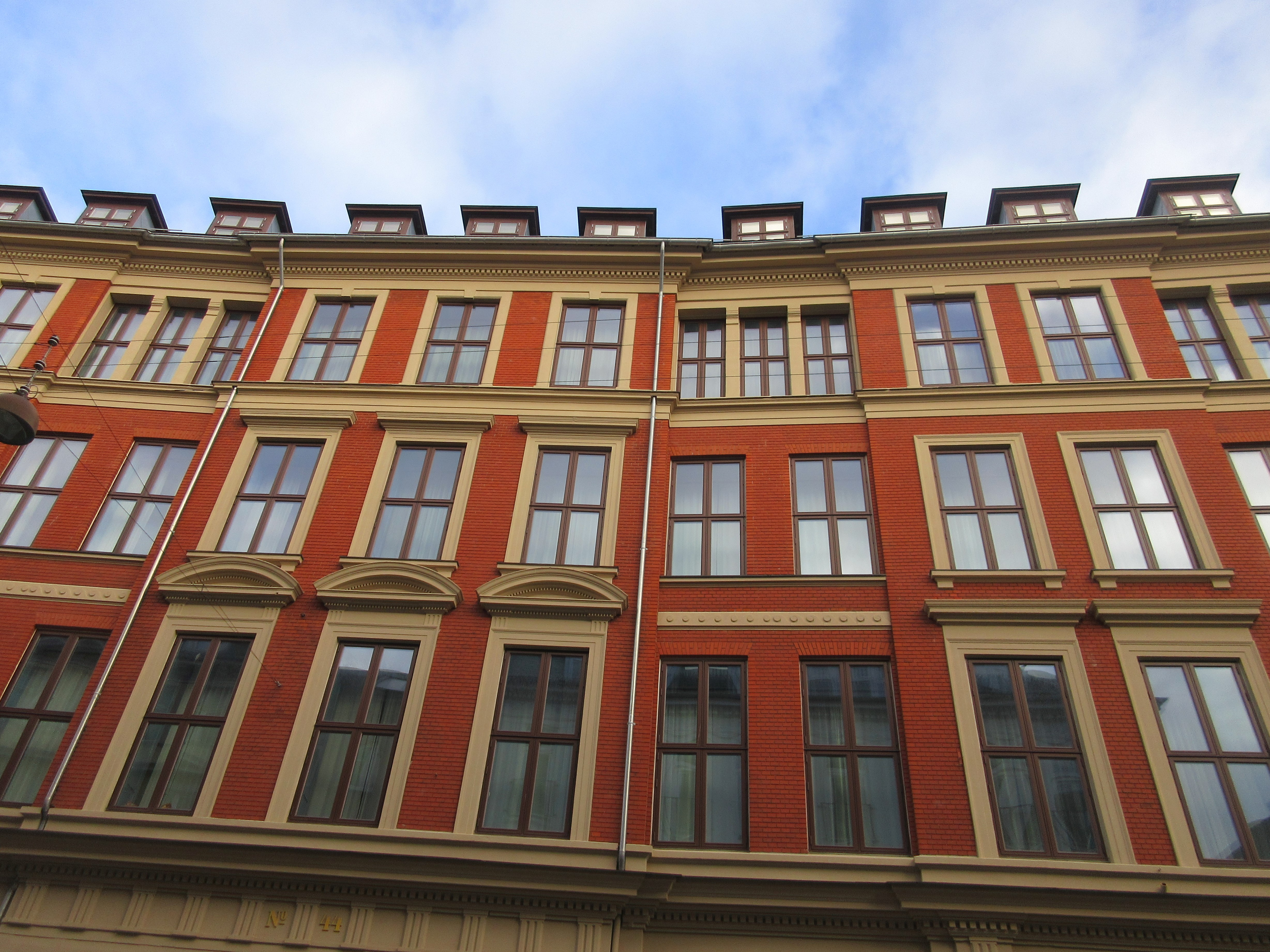

General information
- Location: Copenhagen, Denmark
- Coordinates: 55°40′51.3″N 12°34′38.4″E
- Completed: 1881

Købmagergade 44 is the former headquarters of Holger Petersen's textile company in Copenhagen, Denmark. The present building on the site, which is from the 1880s, replaced the Royal Waisen House (Danish: Det Kgl. Waisenhus), a combined school and orphanagefor indigent children, which relocated to a new purpose-built school building on Nørre Farimagsgade. The institution's old building on Købmagergade was a former Baroque style town mansion from the 1740s, whose earlier residents included Russian envoy to Copenhagen Johann Albrecht Korff and businessmen Joost and Peter van Hemert. From 1971 to 2017, University of Copenhagen's Department of Theology was based in the building. It is now part of the Trinity Quarter, a mixed-use complex owned by Hines, with a 24-hour boutique hotel, retail and six residential apartments.

== History ==
=== Early history ===
Back in the 18th century, the site was made up of two smaller properties. These properties were listed in Copenhagen's first cadastre from 1689 as No. 7 and No. 8 in Rosenborg Quarter.

The northern property (No. 7) had belonged to Ove Christoffersen Liunge til Odden from before 1603 to 1620. It was subsequently owned by successive brewers until 1686. On 11 March 1686, the property was acquired by merchant Jens Nielsen Hald. The next owners were mayor Bartholomæus Jensen (25 April 1694 – 21 June 1715), Chancellery Councillor Hans Scavenius (21 June 1715 – 22 October 1731) and Margrethe Lemvig (22 October 1731 – 15 December 1731).

The southern property (No. 8) belonged to members of the noble Daa family from at least the 1530s. In the years around 1645, it belonged to Admiral of the Realm Claus Daa. The next owners were Christian IV's daughter Sophia Elisabeth (died 1657) and Hans Jørgensen Friis til Clausholm. On 25 August 1664, it was acquired by Christen Jørgensen Skeel. After his death, it passed to his son Jørgen Christensen Skeel. Before 1717, it was acquired by Christian Ditlev Reventlow.

=== Becker ===
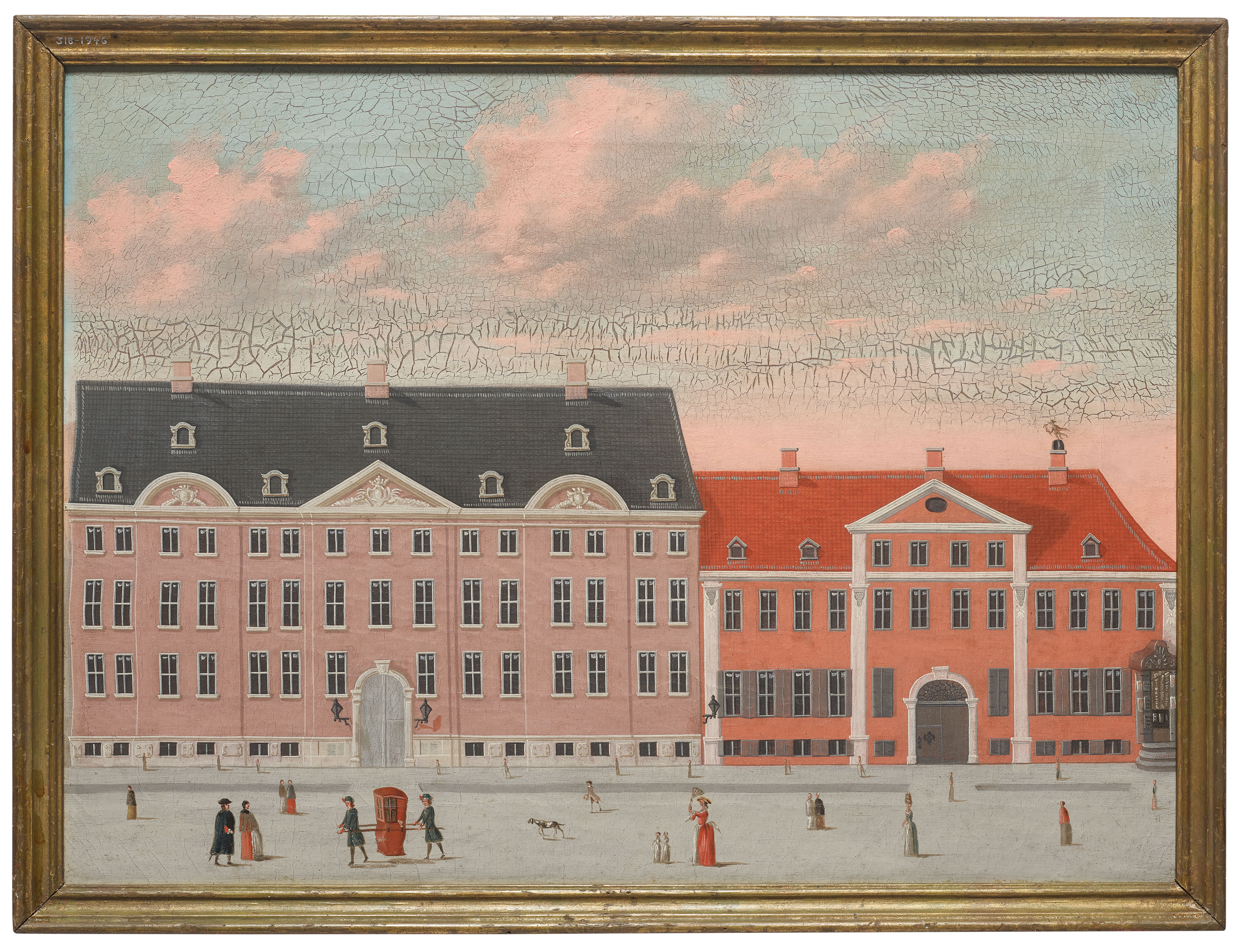
Beckers house to the left, c. 1749. The house to the right is present-day Købmagergade 42 )then No. 9).

On 15 December 1731, No. 7 was acquired by court tailor Henrik Wilhelm Becker. He was married to Johanne Elisabeth Pritsche. On 17 December 1743, No. 8 was also acquired by Becker. He subsequently demolished the two buildings and replaced them with a large, Baroque style town mansion. In the new cadastre of 1756, Becker's properties were individually listed as No. 6–7 in Rosenborg Quarter. He also served as Royal Kitchen Inspector (kitchen supplier, that is). The building was therefore often referred to as "Royal Kitchen-Inspector Becker's House".

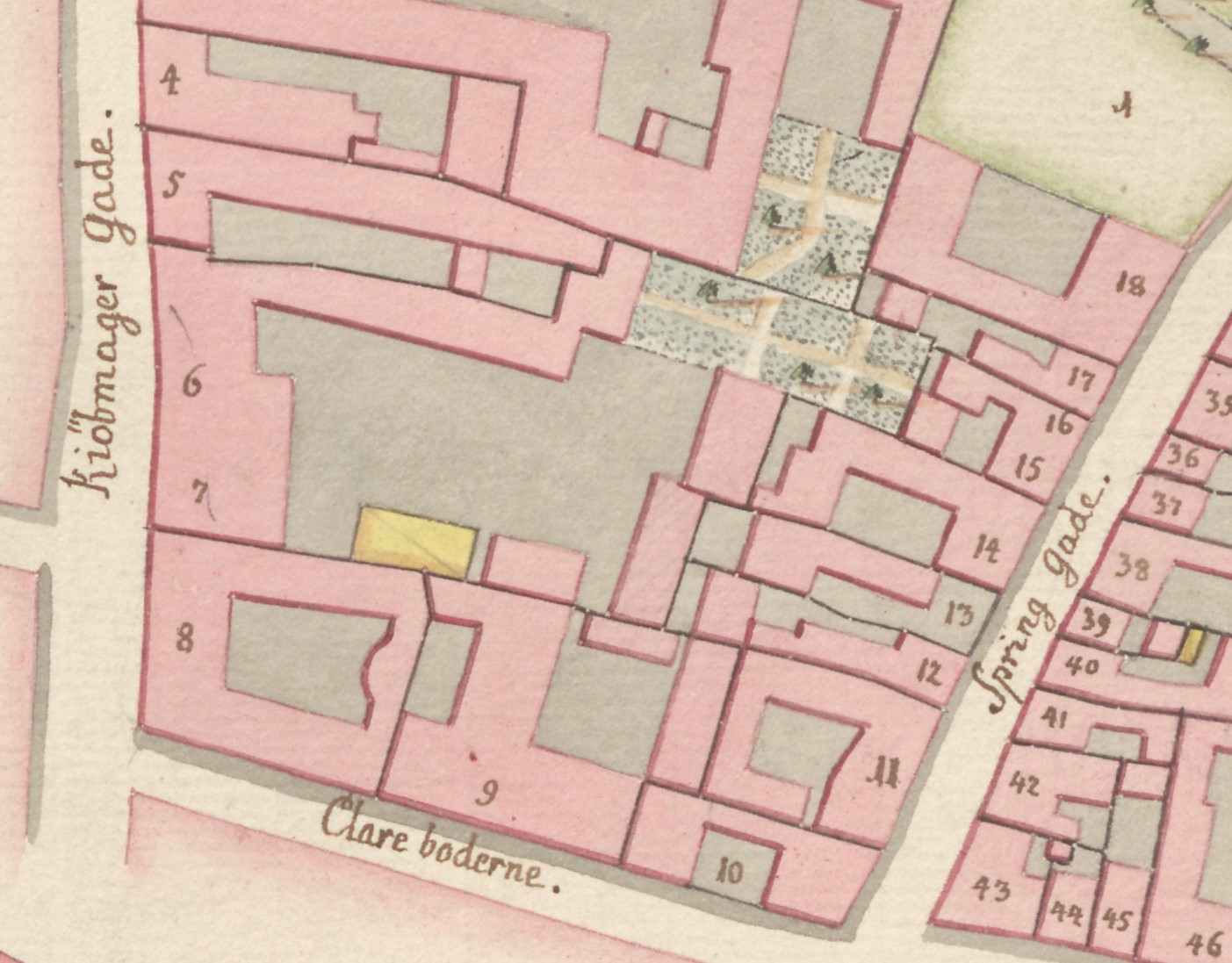
No. 6–7 seen in a detail from Gedde's map of Rosenborg Quarter, 1757

The bel étage of Becker's building was let out to dignitaries. In 1748, it was thus let out to the Russian envoy Johann Albrecht Korff. He served in Copenhagen for two periods: the first time from April 1740 to July 1746. After two years in Stockholm, he returned to the Danish court in February 1748 and stayed here until his death in 1766. He was the owner of an extensive book collection and an excuisite collection of Saxon and Chinese porcelain. In 1743, he instigated the establishment of the first Danish Masonic Lodge (from 1745 known as St. Martin's Lodge), and the meetings were held in his house. Korff's secretary, Aladinsky, was interested in theater and translated two plays for the Royal Theatre: The Ghost by The Drum and The Disguised Doctor. In 1752, Korff engaged in an affair with the actress Caroline Thielo, whom he installed in an extravagant apartment at the corner of Frederiksberggade and Mikkel Bryggersgade. In late 1752, it came to an abrupt end.

=== Joost and Peter van Hemert ===
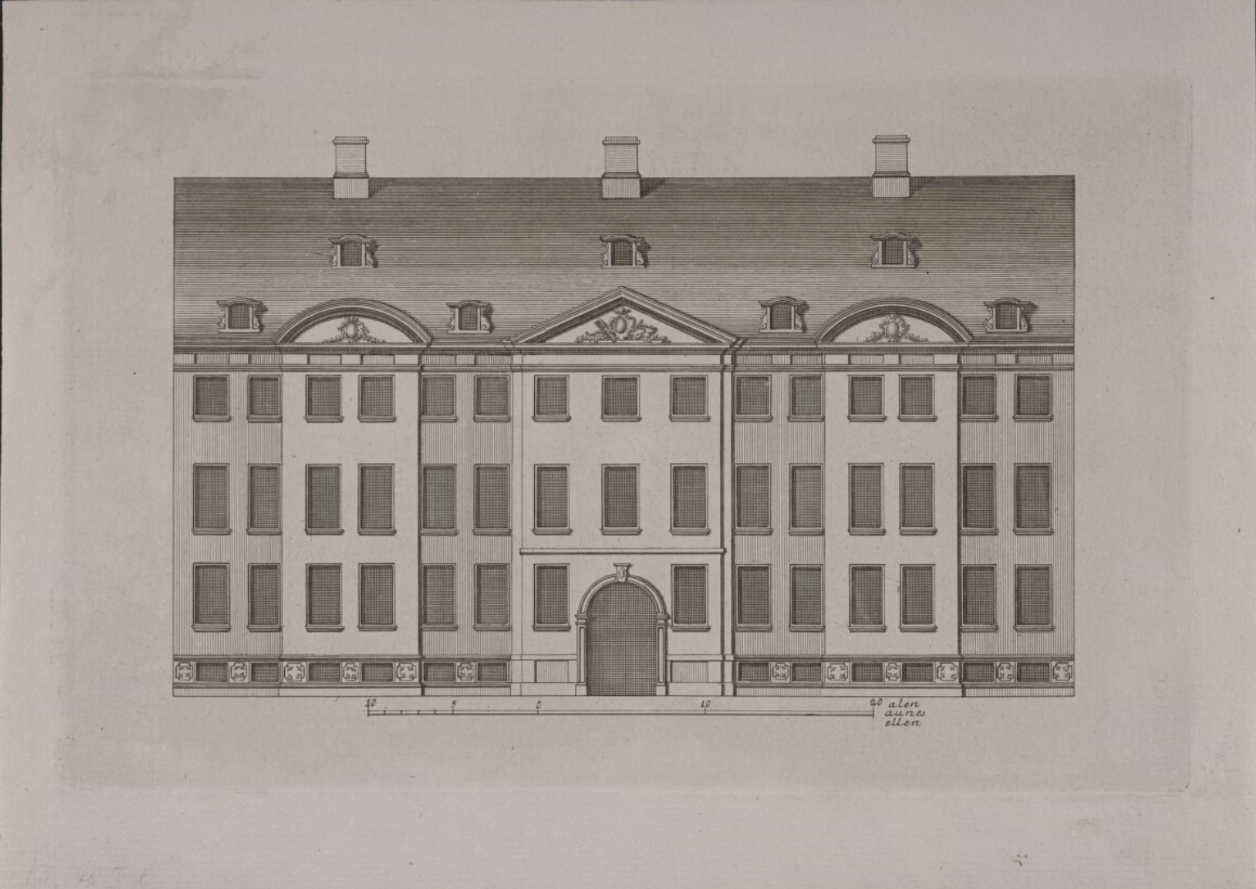
Rendering of Hemert's house

The property was later acquired by Joost van Hemert. He was married to Petronelle Elisabeth Mestecker (1703–1778). Hemert was also the owner of the country house Frederiksdal Lyststed (now Tusculum) on the north side of Bagsværd Lake. He had a large collection of curiosities.

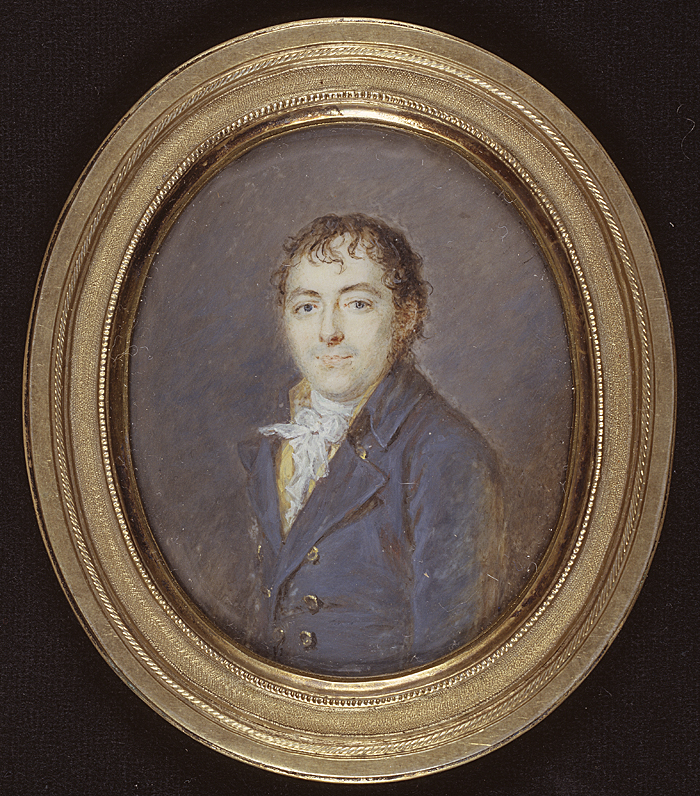
Peter van Hemert

Hemert died on 15 June 1775 and was buried in the German Reformed Church. The property was subsequently passed to his son Peter van Hemert, who, together with his half-brother, Gysbert Behagen, also continued the family firm. Peter van Hemert was married to Agathe Hooglant (1746-1823), a daughter of admiral Simon Hooglant (1712–89) and Marie Hooglandt (died 1754).

At the 1787 census, Hemert and his wife lived in the building with their five children (aged 10 to 19), the wife's sister Alida de Favin (née Hoglandh), their children's French-teacher Charlotte Amalia Rosenkilde, a hovmester associated with Hemert's office, five office clerks, a manager of the store in the basement, a housekeeper, four maids, a coachman, a male servant and a caretaker.

Hemert's trading firm was hit hard by the negative effects that the Napoleonic Wars had on overseas trade. In 1805, it was taken into bankruptcy. It was therefore decided to sell his property at auction. The property was listed in the new cadastre of 1806 as No. 6 in Rosenborg Quarter.

=== The Royal Weissen House ===
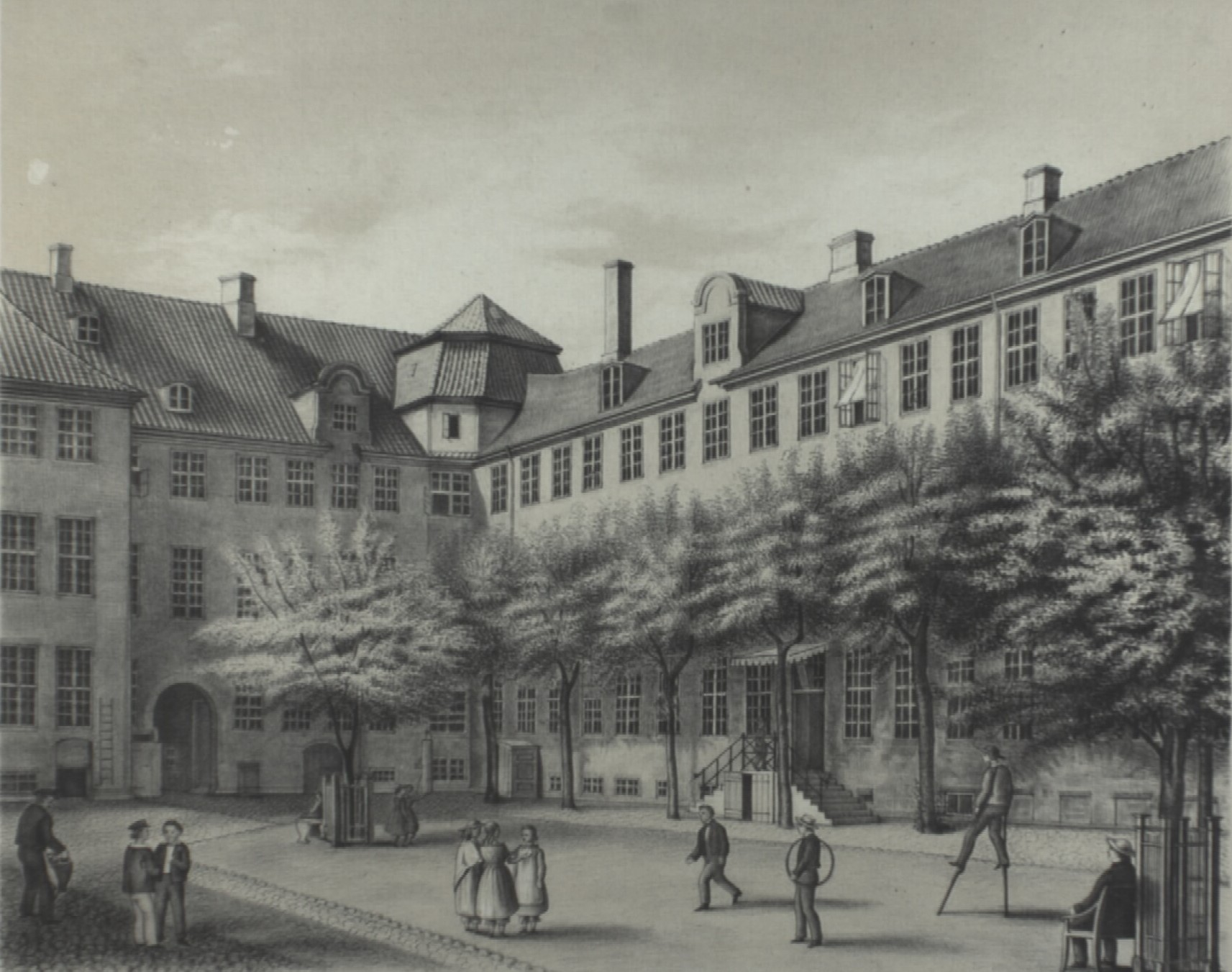
The Vajsenhus' yard, between 1840 and 1892

Jacob Gude saw Hemert's property as a suitable new home for the Royal Wajsen House, an institution for indigent children, whose previous building, on Nytorv, where Copenhagen Court House stands today, had been destroyed in the Copenhagen Fire of 1795. At the auction, which took place on 26 August 1806, Gude succeeded in buying the property with a final bid of 41,250 Danish rigsdaler. The Royal Waisen House had found a temporary home at Blågård. The inauguration of its new building on Købmagergade was heavily delayed by the British bombardment of Copenhagen in 1807.

The new institution was inaugurated on 9 December 1811. It had room for 37 children. In 1824 the Normal School for Mutual Education for 100 children was established, and from 1826 the foundation completely stopped providing accommodation for children.

The Royal Waisenhus Pharmacy was located in one of the side wings. Jens Peter Groth, its proprietor, found the new premises, without direct access from the street, highly unsatisfactory. In 1826. he moved it to another building further down the street (now Købmagergade 36).

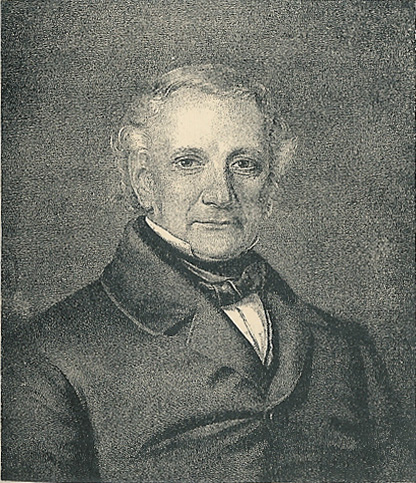
C. A. Reitzel.

In 1827, C. A. Reitzel's publishing house and book shop relocated to the building. Its new premises served almost as a literary club. It was frequented by most of the leading writers of the Danish Golden Age, including Genrik Hertz, Christian Winther, B. S. Ingemann, Hauch, Steen Steensen Blicher, N. F. S. Grundtvig, H. P. Holst and Søren Kierkegaard. Hans Christian Andersen was often represented by Rdward Collin. On Reitzel's death in 1853, C. A. Reitzel was continued by his son Theodor Reitzel (1828-1906) and Carl Valdemar Reitzel (1833-1911) with as parft of the management. Shortly thereafter, it relocated to Løvstræde 7.

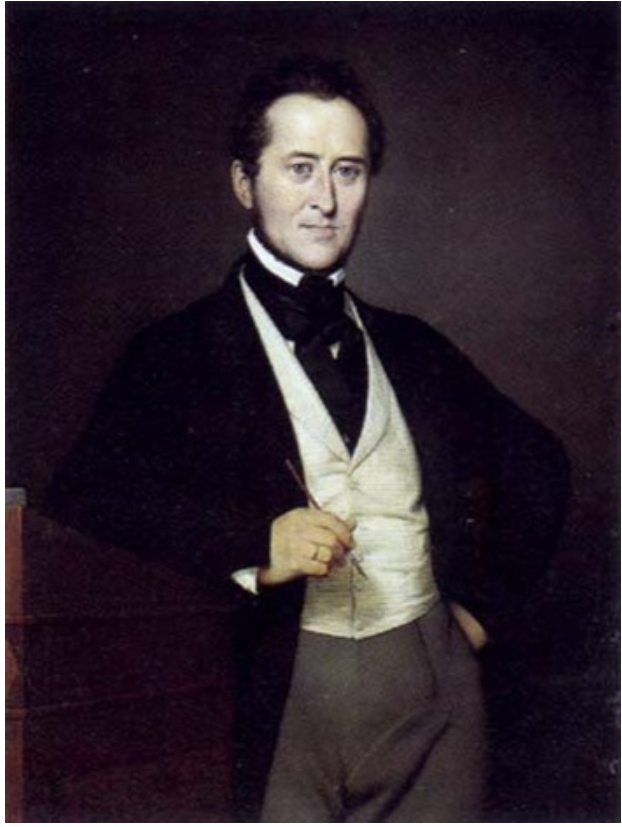
Wilhelm Eanscher.

One of Wajsenhuset's other tenants was the parer merchant Wilhelm Wanscher, In 1733, he established his own firm in one of the side wings.He was the first external distributor of paper products from Strandmøllen north of Copenhagen. He was one of the largest suppliers of paper products to the Danish state. His other customers included the newspaper Adresseavisen and the book printer Bianco Luno. In 1912, Nanna Wanscher published her childhood memoirs as Minder fra min barndom og ungdom.

The property was home to five households at the 1840 census. Georg Rung (1799–1868, brother of composer Genrik Rung), inspector of Vajsenhuset, resided on the first floor with his wife Nicoline Lindgreen, their two daughters (aged five and eight), his mother Helene Rung, his brother Frederik Rung, one male servant and two maids. C. A. Reitzel resided on the ground floor to the left with his wife Sophie Thostrup, their six children (aged seven to 19), his mother-in-law Dorthea Thostrup, her two apprentices, two male servants and two maids. William Wanscher resided on the ground floor to the right with his wife Johanne Wamscher, their two daughters (aged two and four), an apprentice and two maids. Oline Lützen, a teacher at the school, resided on the second floor with her mother Margrethe Lützen, a lodger and a maid. Anton Guldbrandsen, another teacher at the school, resided on the same floor with his wife Anna Guldbrandsen and their seven children (aged three to 24).

Georg Rung and Anth. Ferd. Christ. Gulbrandsen were still residents of the building at the 1860 census. Theodor Lind, a new bookseller, resided in the building with his wife Betty Wilhelmine Lind født Honum and one maid. Gotfred Buchwald, a new paper retailer, resided in the building with his wife Hanne Buchwald født Doring, their two children (aged five and eight) and one maid.

In 1872, it was decided to sell the Wajsenhus Building. In 1874–76, its new building on Nørre Farimagsgade was constructed. The new building was designed by the architect C. F. Rasmussen.

=== Hoffensberg & Trap ===
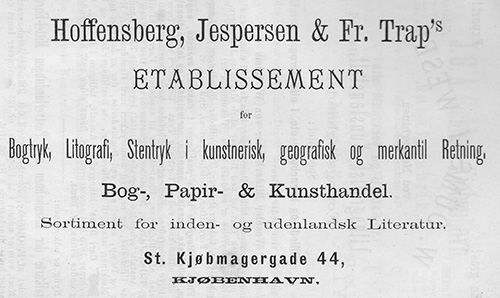
Advert for Hoffensberg, Jespersen & Trap (1876).

In 1876, Købmagergade 44 was sold for DKK 442,600 to Hoffensberg, Jespersen & Trap purchased the building. The company was the result of a resent merger between Det Hoffensbergske Etablissement (founded 1855, owned by Julius Hoffensberg), Otto Schwarts Eftf.s Boghandel (founded 1865) and Em. Bærentzen & Co. (founded 1838). The book printing business G. S. Eibes Bogtrykkeri (founded 1859) was also part of the merger. Later in the same year, I. P. Trap passed his share of the company to his son, Frederik. The name of the company was changed to Hoffenberg & Trap when E. Jespersen left the company in 1878. In 1788, Hoffensberg & Trap undertook a comprehensive renovation of the building. Trap died in 1882, leaving Hoffensberg as the sole proprietor until he was joined by Alfred Grut 1887 in 1898.

From 1883 to 1885, the artist Frans Henningsen's studio was located on the third floor of the building.

=== Holger Petersen ===
In 1875, Holger Petersen relocated to the building. The company's previous home was at Købmagergade 0. In 1888, Petersen bought the property. Over the next years, especially in 1889-90 and 1906–07, it was subject to extensive alterations and expansions. Det Hoffenbergske Etablissement was a tenant in their old building until 1906. Their next home was at Kronprinsessegade 28. The company N. Hansen & Co. was a tenant in the building until 1917. Holger Petersen A/S was based in the building until at least the 1940s. The ground floor of the building was let out to the adjacent department store Messen.

=== Later history ===
The University of Copenhagen's Department of Theology relocated to the building complex in 1971. In 2015/2+17, it relocated to the university's South Campus on Amager.

== Architecture ==
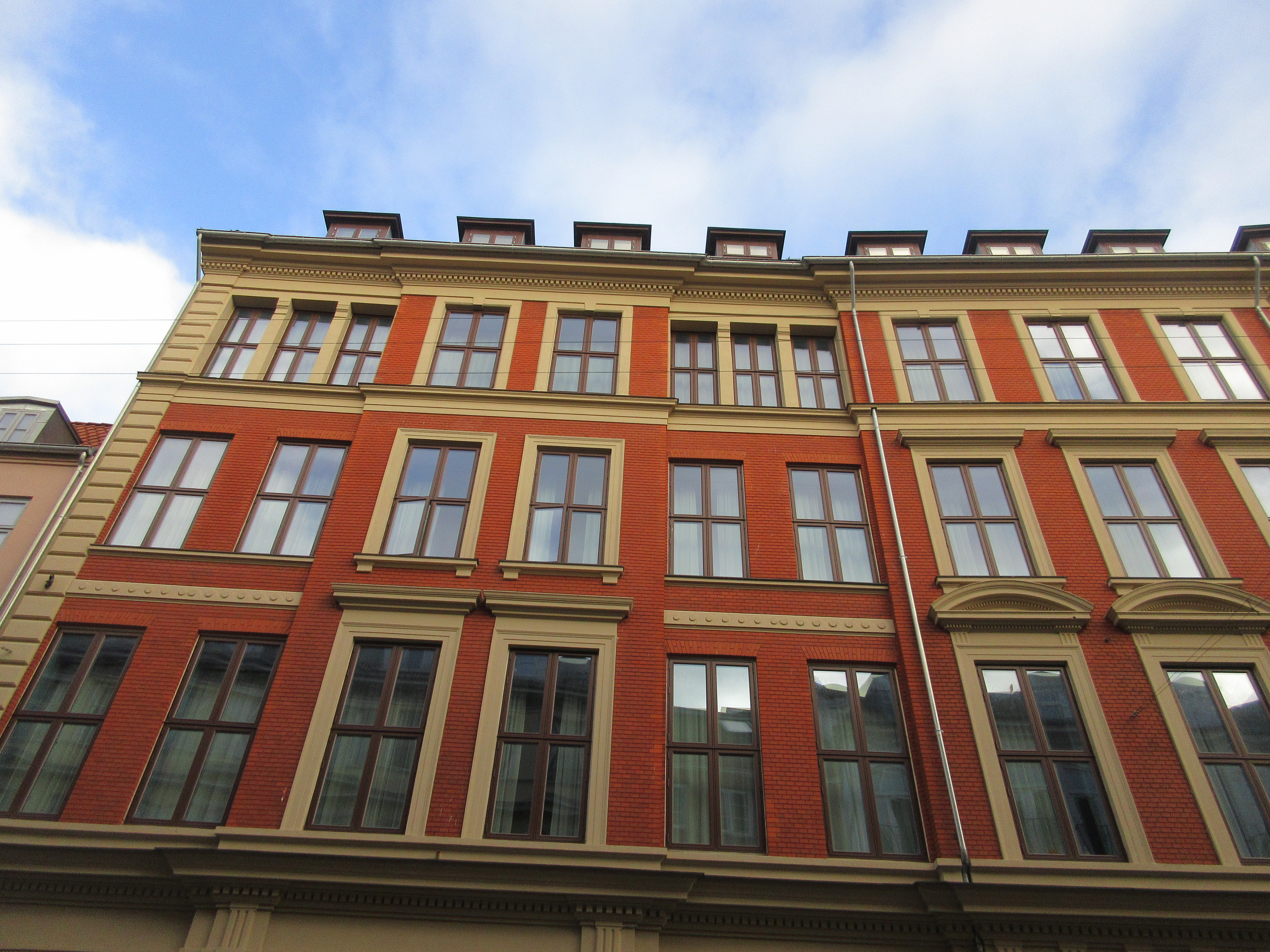
Købmagergade 44 in 2024.

Købmagergade 44 is a 15-bay-wide, four-storey brick building. The facade is rendered in a rusty-red colour with grey-painted ornamental details. The windows of the slightly projecting three central bays and the third-and-fourth bay from each side are accented with extra framing. The three central first-floor windows are in addition to this tipped by segmental pediments. A central gateway opens to the building's central courtyard. The recessed sections of the facade (first-and second and fifth-and sixth bay from each side) feature a narrow band with circular relief motifsd between the windows of the second and the third floor. Other decorative details include quoin lesenes at the edges and a dentillated cornice.

== Today ==
In 2017, Hines bought Købmagergade 44–46 and Købmagergade 50. The 22m000 square metre building complex was subsequently transformed into a mixed-use complex with boutique hotel, retail and six residential apartments.
