= 1837 in Denmark =

- Decades: 1810s; 1820s; 1830s; 1840s; 1850s
- See also: Other events of 1837; List of years in Denmark

Events from the year 1837 in Denmark.

== Incumbents ==
- Monarch – Frederick VI
- Prime minister – Otto Joachim

== Events ==
- 7 April - C.A. Reitzel publishes Hans Christian Andersen's Fairy Tales Told for Children. First Collection. Third Booklet (Eventyr, fortalte for Børn. Første Samling. Tredie Hefte. 1837) containing fairytales such as The Little Mermaid and The Emperor's New Clothes.

=== Undated ===
- The artist Emil Bærentzen founds his own printing business as Em. Bærentzen & Co.'s Lithografiske Institut.

== Culture ==
=== Music ===
- B. S. Ingemann publishes Morgensange for Børn with seven morning songs for children as well as Foraarssang ("Storken sidder paa Bondens Tag;"),

== Births ==
- 21 April – Fredrik Bajer, writer (died 1922)
- 4 July – Sophus Mads Jørgensen, chemist (died 1914)
- 5 September – Janus la Cour, painter (died 1909)
- 5 November – Philip Heyman, businessman (died 1893)
- 26 December – Budtz Müller, photographer (born 1884)

== Deaths ==
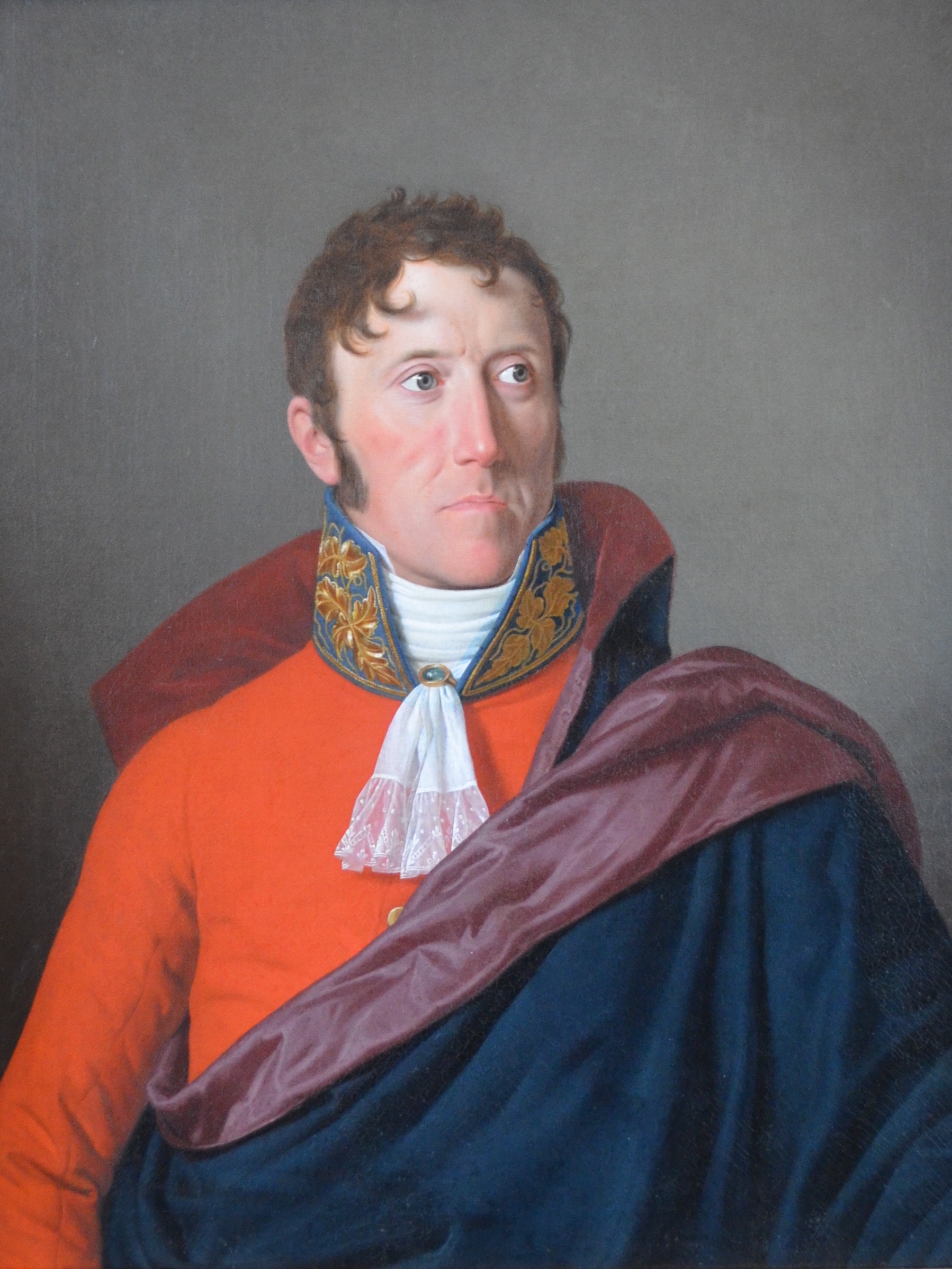
Frederik Hoppe.

- 7 January – Erich Erichsen, merchant and ship-owner (born (1752)
- 22 February – Frederik Hoppe, landowner (died 1770)
- 15 April – Marie Christine Björn, ballet dancer (born 1763)
- 21 October – Hans Nicolai Arctander, county governor (born 1757 in Norway)
- 27 November – Salomon Soldin, publisher and writer (born 1774)
