= Franz Šedivý =

Danish illustrator

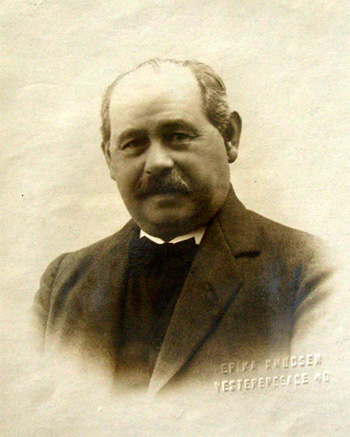
- Photograph of Franz Šedivý
- Born: 2 December 1864; Prague, Austria-Hungary
- Died: 20 April 1945 (aged 80); Frederiksberg, Denmark
- Known for: Illustrator

Franz Šedivý (2 December 1864 – 20 April 1945) was a Czech-born Danish illustrator, most known for his detailed bird's-eye view prospects. He worked for many of the leading newspapers and magazines of his time. His work was also featured on postcards, advertisements and in schoolbooks.

== Early life and education ==
Šedivý was born on 2 December 1864 in Prague, the son of xylographer Franz Joseph Sedivý and Therese Josephine Sadlo. He was educated as a lithographer and draughtsman from Hoffenberg & Trap in 1883. He was also following classes in drawing at the Royal Danish Academy of Fine Arts in 1882.

== Career ==
Šedivý worked for Illustreret Tidende from 1884. He became known for his large and extremely detailed bird's-eye view panoramas of Danish towns, districts and other localities.

He worked for Familie Journalen in 1895-1911 and as a freelancer for the magazines Nutiden, Nordstjernen and Hjemmet as well as for the newspapers Politiken and Berlingske Tidende.

He was also active as an illustrator of school books through thefirm Alfred Jacobsens Litografiske Etablissement. He was also creating scenography for puppet theatre, and his work was popular as motifs on postcards and Christmas cards, for instance from Stenders Kunstforlag.

== Personal life ==
Šedivý married twice, first with Anna Kæmmer on 3 May 1889 and second time with Doris Anna Poulsen on 2 August 1919. He lived in Frederiksberg.

== Gallery ==
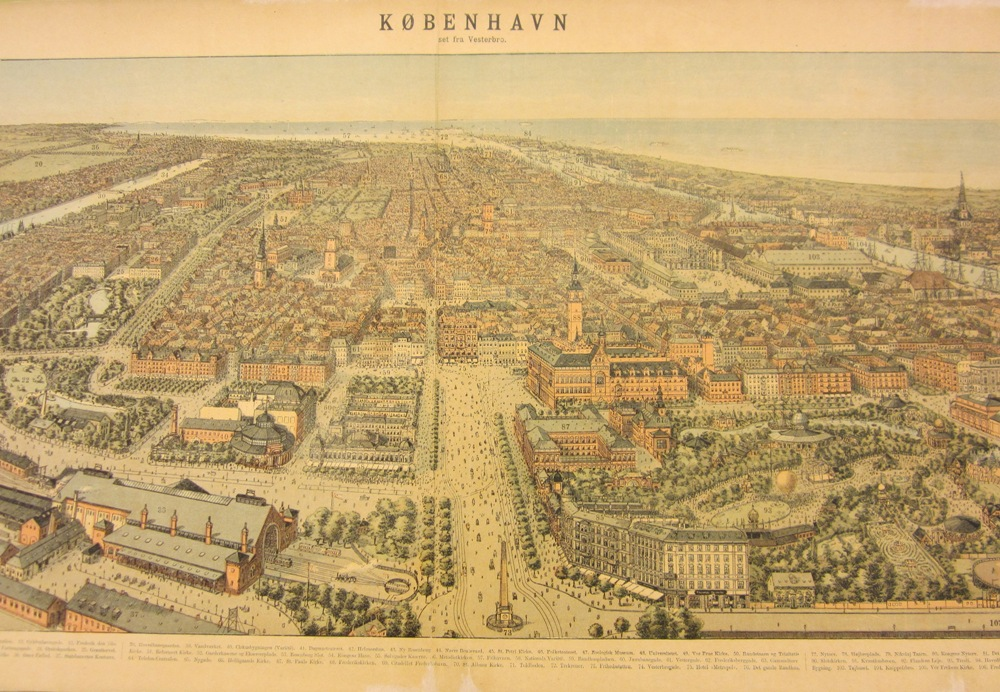
Copenhagen, 1887

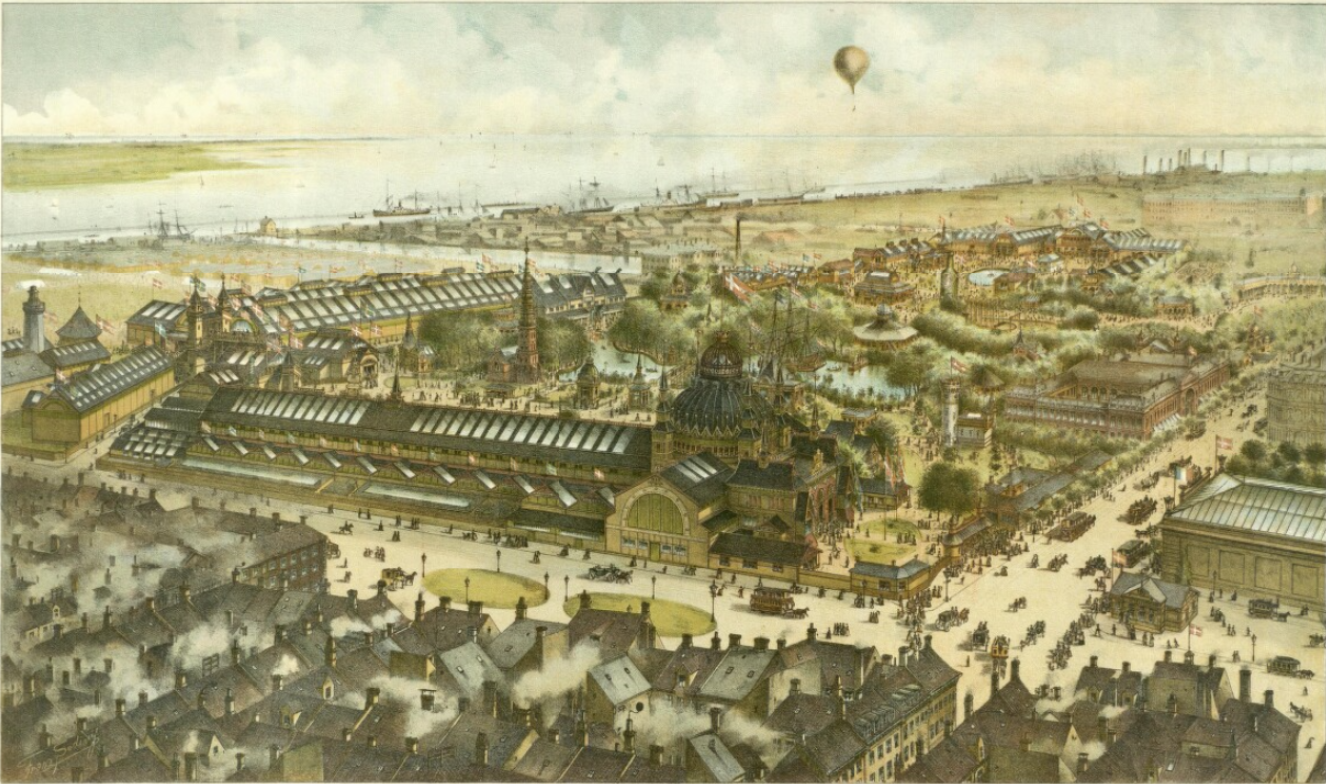
Nordic Exhibition of 1888 in Copenhagen (zoom)

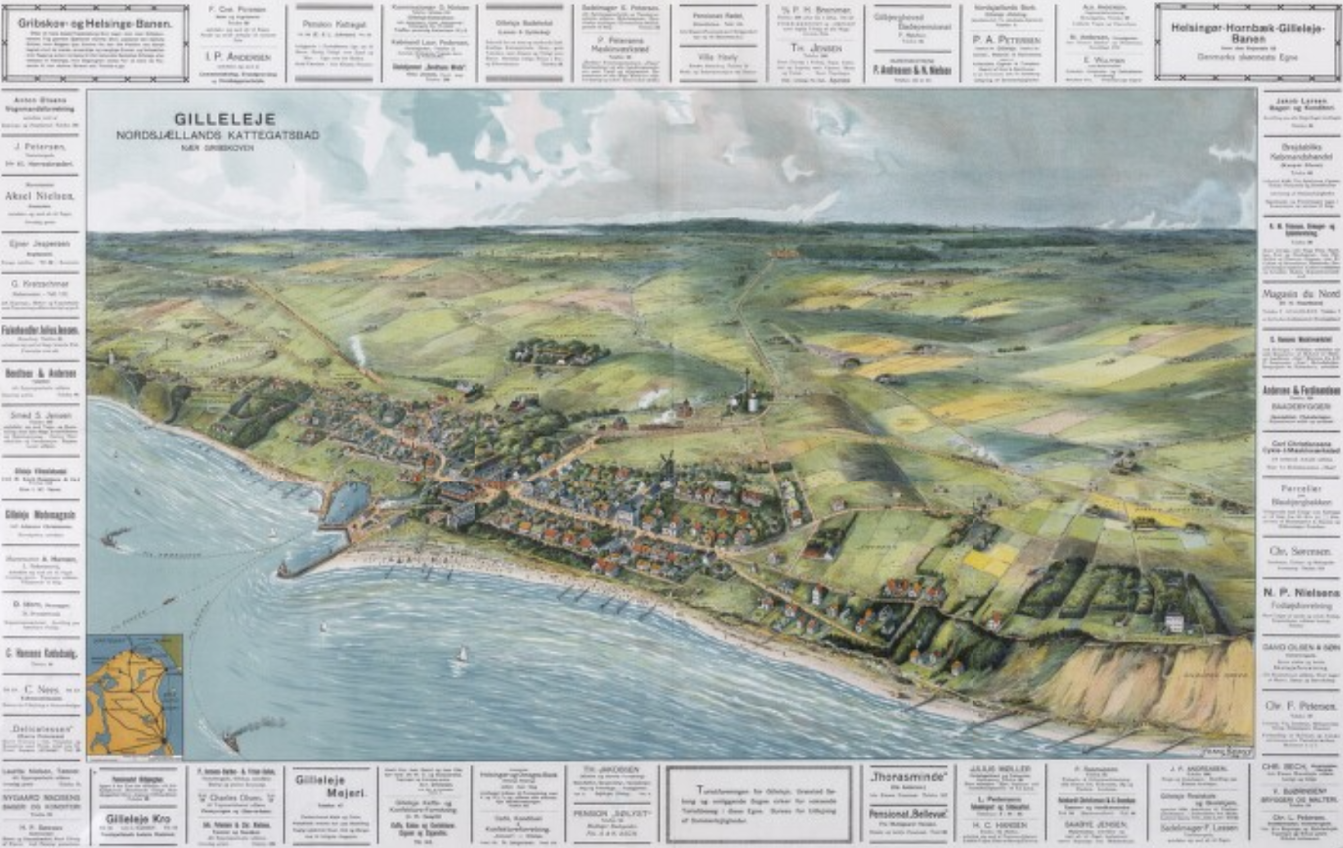
Gilleleje, 1918 (zoom)

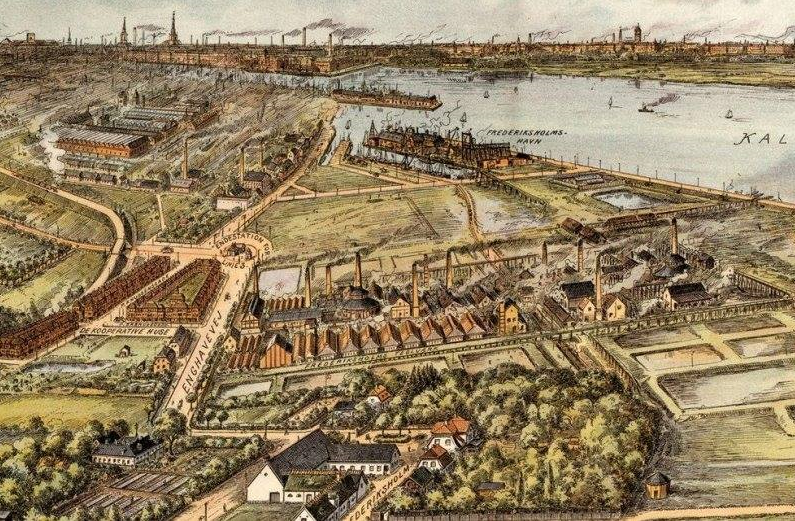
Southern Docklands of Copenhagen

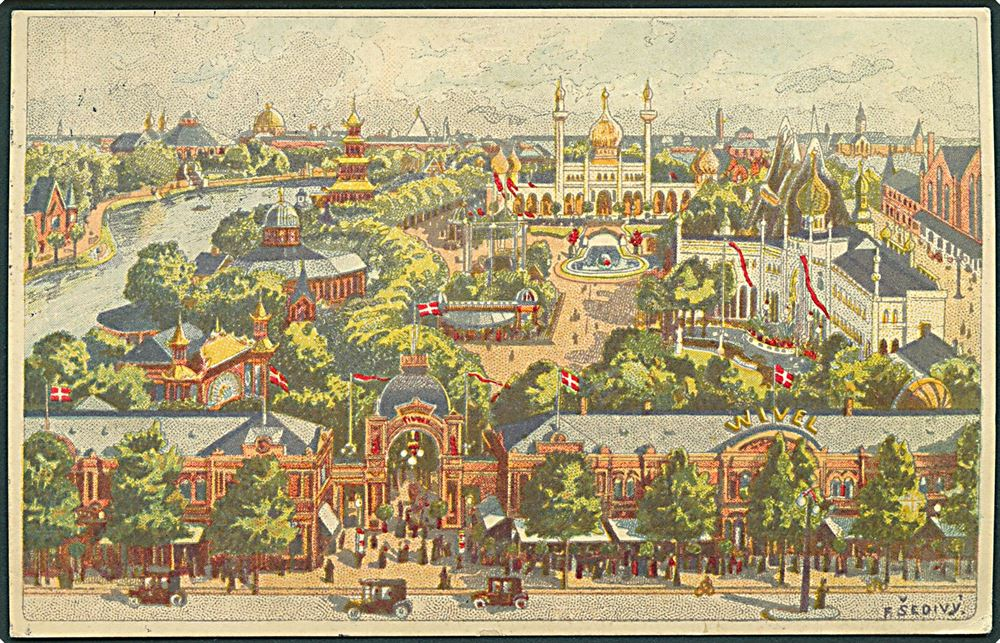
Tivoli Gardens, 1921

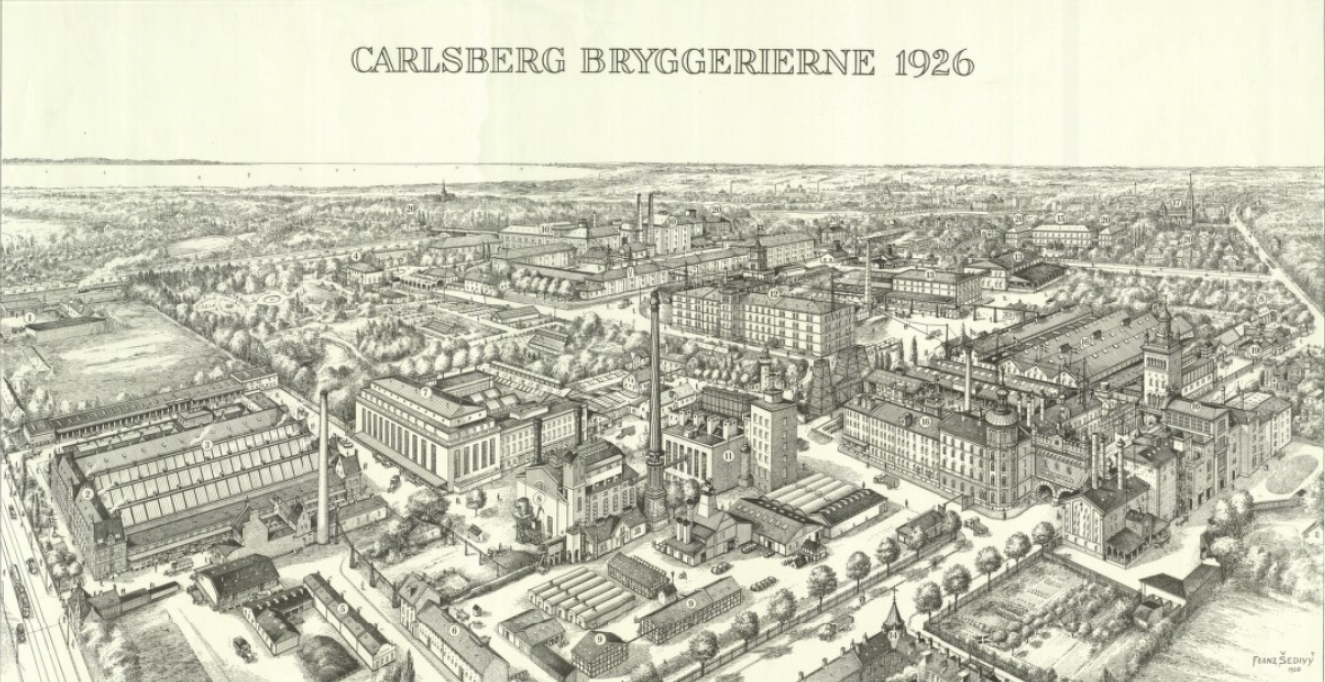
Carlsberg Copenhagen (zoom)
