= Kronprinsessegade 28 =

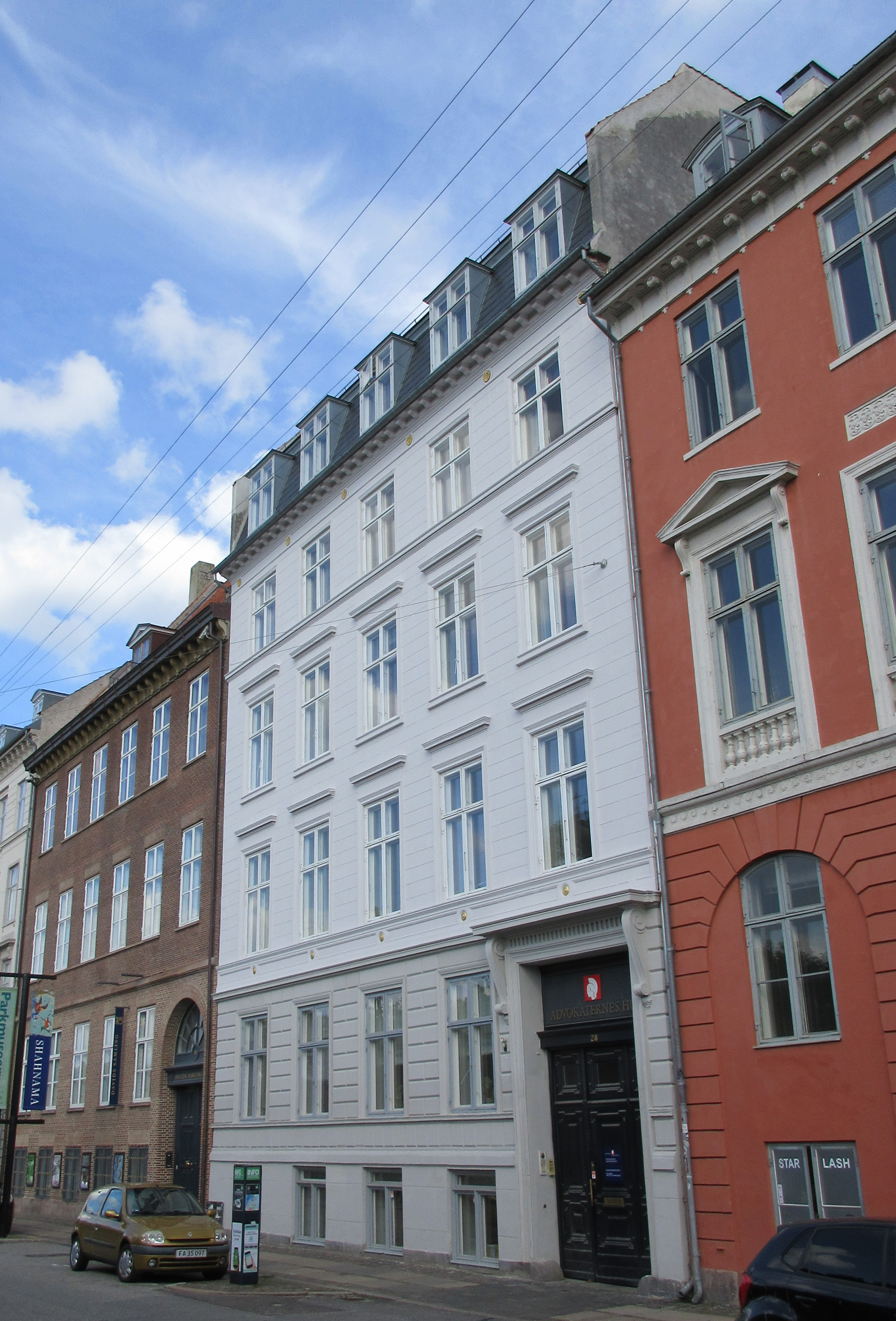
- Interactive map of the Kronprinsessegade 28 area

General information
- Location: Copenhagen, Denmark
- Coordinates: 55°41′2.99″N 12°34′55.89″E
- Completed: 1806

Design and construction
- Architect: Jørgen Henrich Rawert

Kronprinsessegade 28 is a listed, Neoclassical property overlooking Rosenborg Castle Garden in central Copenhagen, Denmark. It was listed on the Danish registry of protected buildings and places in 1945. The building was for many years owned by the politician and busi businessman L. N. Hvidt. Other notable former residents include naval officer Poul de Løvenørn, politician and jurist Anders Sandøe Ørsted, archeologist Jens Jacob Asmussen Worsaae, government official and publisher Jens Peter Trap, architect Ferdinand Meldahl, journalist and politician C. St. A. Bille (1828-1898) and Fyldendal-publisher Peter Nansen.

== History ==
=== Rawert ===
Kronprinsessegade 28 was built by city builder (stadskonduktør) Jørgen Henrich Rawert in 1805–1806. Rawert was a resident in the building in 1808. The naval officer Poul de Løvenørn resided in the building from 1808 to 1810.

=== [Lauritz Nicolai Hvidt, 1812–56 ===
Ship-owner and politician Lauritz Nicolai Hvidt lived in the building from 1812 until his death in 1856. He was a member of the Copenhagen City Council from 1840 and its chairman from 1841. As a liberal politician, he was involved in the work for a free constitution. On 20 March 1848, he led a procession of 10,000 people that marched from Copenhagen City Hall on Nytorv to Christiansborg Palace.

Hvidt resided on the third floor at the 1840 census. He lived there with his wife Vilhelmine Therese Borck, their three children (aged 16 to 23), three male servants and four maids. Johan Franciscus Gottlieb Schønheyder[ (1773-1850), director of Rentekammeret, resided on the second floor with his wife Engelke Marie (née Smith, 1770-1847), their five children (aged 16 to 26), one male servant and two maids. Moses Martin Ludvig Fürst (1784-1846), a wholesale merchant (grosserer), resided on the first floor with his wife Frederikke Emilie (mée Hertz, 1794-1845), their 10 children (aged one to 25), one male servant and four maids. Joachim Kretchmer Malling, a commander in the King's Life Regiment, resided on the first floor with his wife Mathilde Kitzon, their four children (aged 12 to 21), 36-year-old Louise v. Leth (tutor and de facto member of the family), one male servant and three maids. Margrethe Due, a concierge, resided in the basement with her son Andreas Peter Knie.

The jurist F. T. J. Gram (1816–1871) was a resident in the building from 1848 to 1853. His next home was in Gammel Strand 36.

The politician Anders Sandøe Ørsted lived in the building as Hvidt's tenant from 1851 and remained there until his death in 1861.

The archeologist Jens Jacob Asmussen Worsaae lived in the building from 1853 to 1857.

=== 1860–1900 ===
Cabinet Secretary Jens Peter Trap (1810–1885), publisher of the monumental work Trap Danmark, lived in the building 1857–1871. The influential architect and local politician Ferdinand Meldahl lived in the building from 1858 to 1875.

Journalist and politician C. St. A. Bille (1828–1898) lived in the building from 1875 to 1880. Ferdinand Frederik Ekman (1839–1901) was a resident in the building at the time of his death in 1901. He is one of the businessmen depicted on Peder Severin Krøyer's monumental 1895 group portrait painting From Copenhagen Stock Exchange. He was married to royal opera singer Nanna Maria Andrejette Ekman.

=== 20th century ===
Gyldendal director Peter Nansen (1861–1918) lived in the building from 1912 until his death in 1918.

Det Hoffensbergske Etablissement, a printing business was based in the building from at least 1910 to 1950.

Fru Trolles Vævestue, a textile manufacturer, relocated to the building in 1931. It had until then been located in Dronningens Tværgade. The associated weaving school was based at Store Kongensgade 68 from 1934.

== Architecture ==
The building consists of four storeys over a high cellar. It is five bays wide. The roof has three dormers.

== Gallery ==
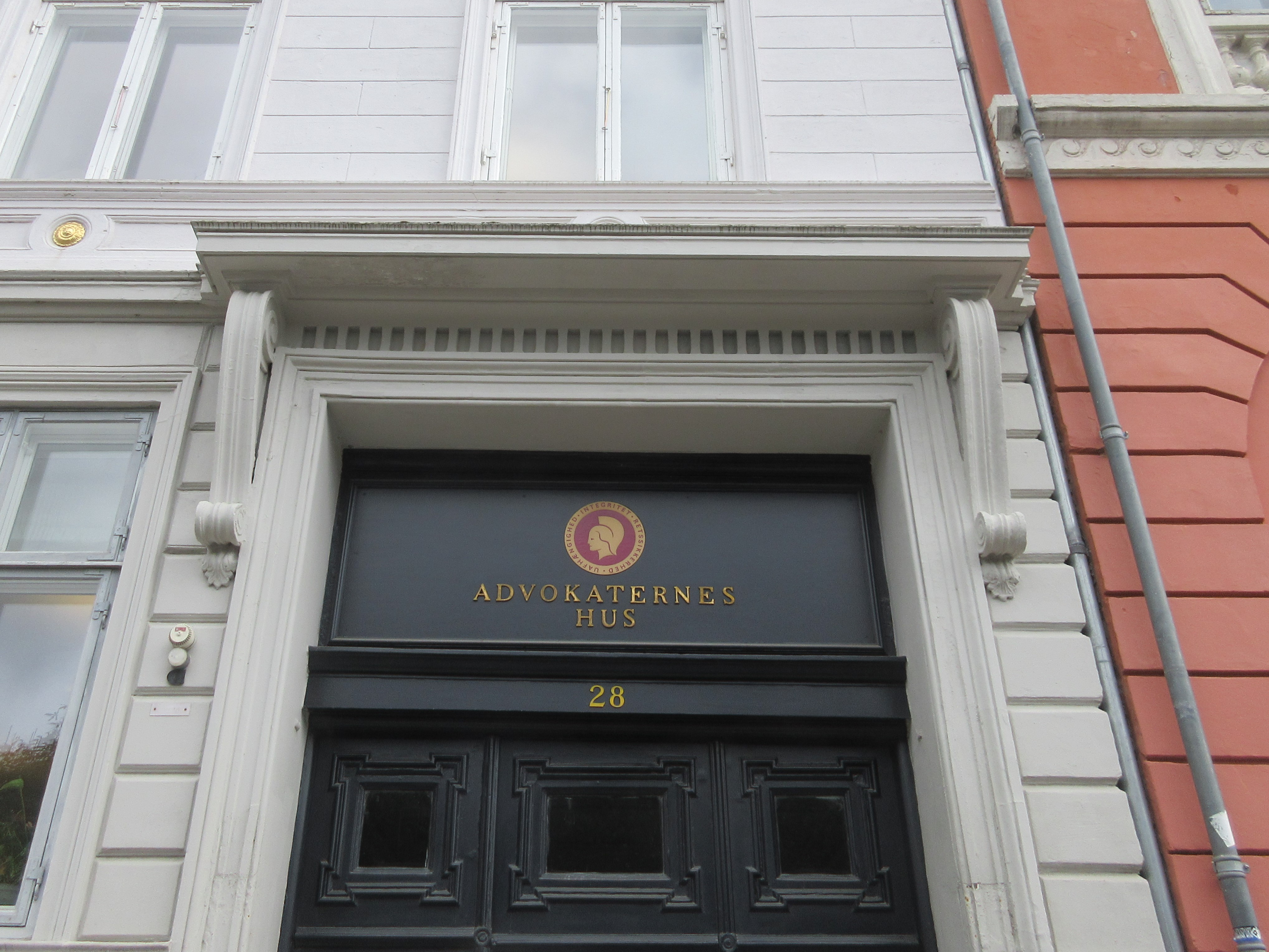
Detail
