= Kittendorff & Aagaard =

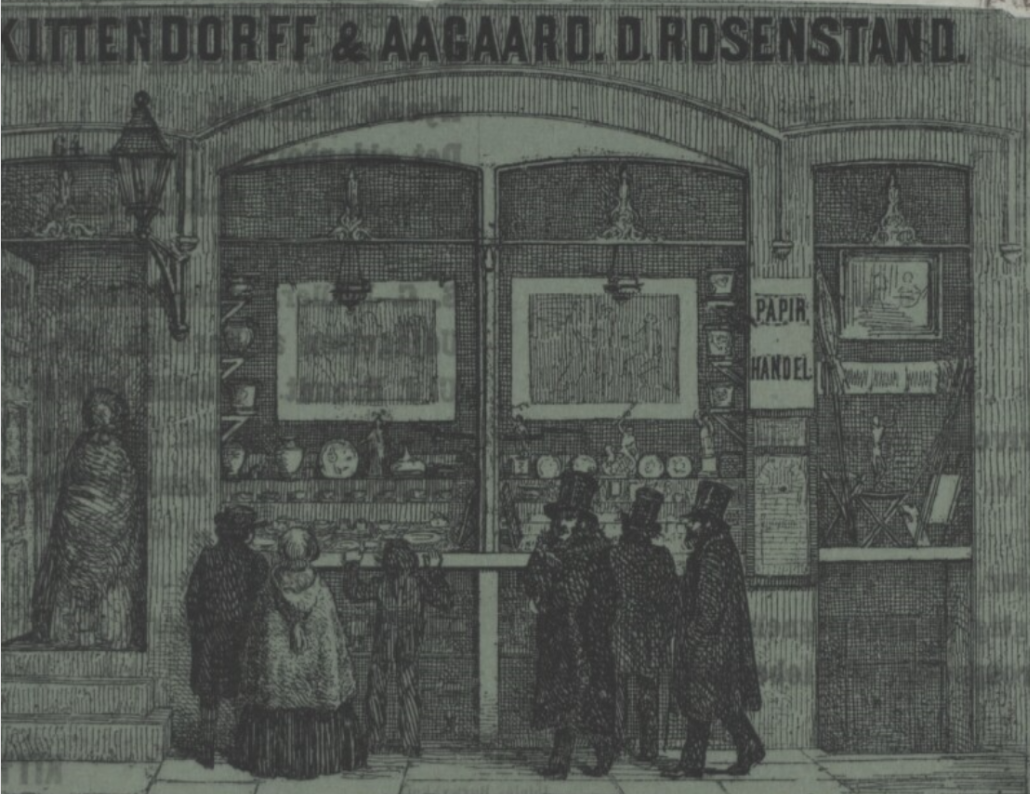
Kittendorff & Aagaard in Købmagergade

Kittendorff & Aagaard, later Kittendorff & Aagaar & B. Olsen was a leading woodcut printer and photographic studio and publishing house based in Copenhagen, Denmark.

== History ==
The studio was founded in 1849 by xylographers (woodcut printers) Axel Kittendorff and Johan Aagaard in 1849. It soon developed into one of the leading studios of its kind in Copenhagen. The company was based in Købmagergade. The activities also comprised a store with prints and book publishing. Woodcut printers who worked for the firm included H.C. Henneberg, J.F. Rosenstand and H.P. Hansen.

Bernhard Olsen worked at the studio in the 1860s and ended up as a partner. The firm closed when Kittendorff died in 1868, followed by Aagaard in 1879.

== Publications ==
- Holst, Vilhelm : Felttogene 1848, 49, 50 (1852)
- Fabricius, Adam: Illustreret Danmarkshistorie (1854–55)
- Erslev, Edvard: Den Danske Stat (1855–57)
- Bache, Niels: Danmarks Norges og Sveriges Historie (I-V, 1867–76)
