= Varehuset Messen =

Building in Copenhagen, Denmark

Coordinates: 55.6808°N 12.5779°E

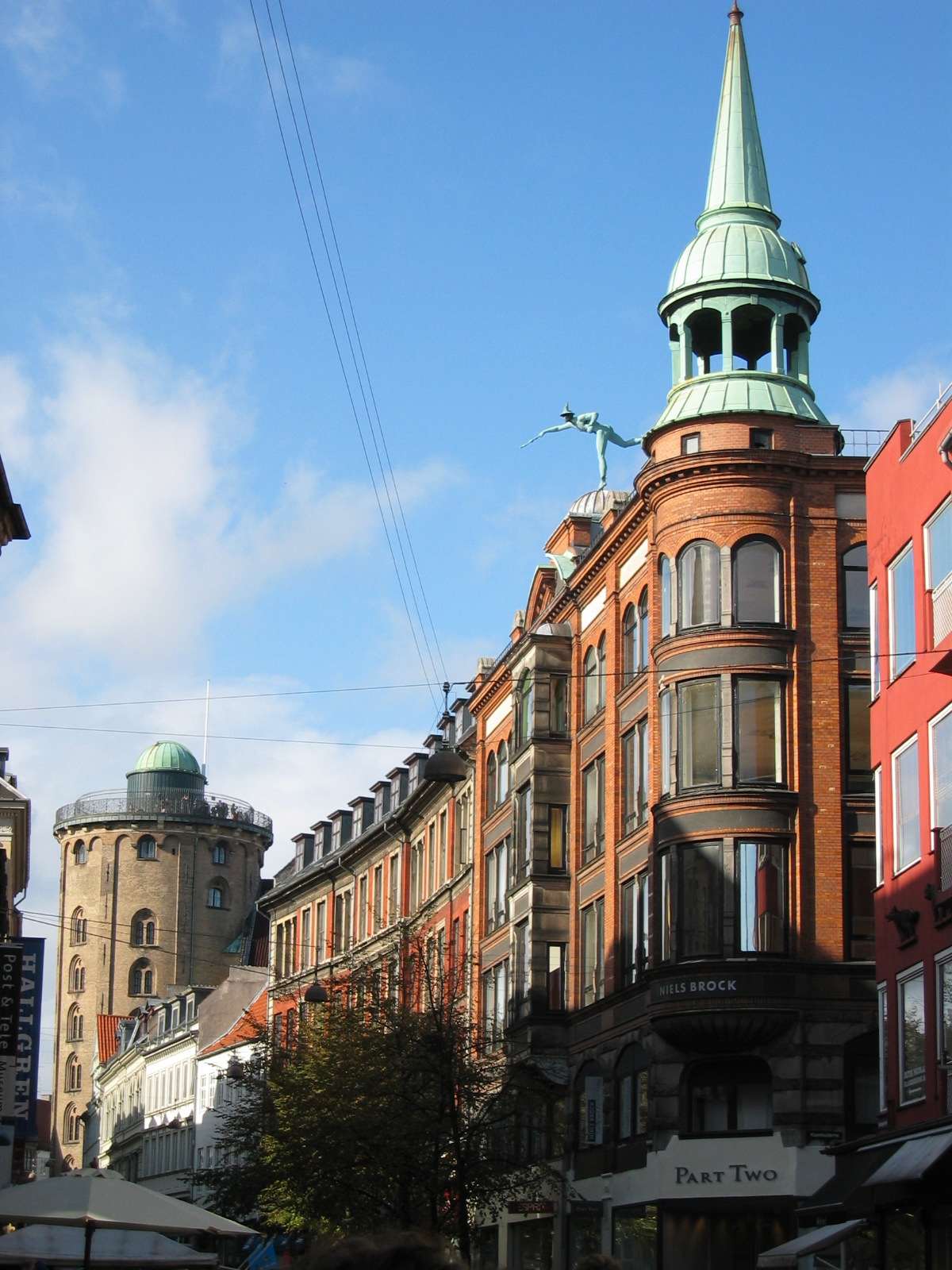
The building on Købmagergade

Varehuset Messen was a department store on Købmagergade in central Copenhagen, Denmark, operated by Hilligsøe, Køedt & Co.. The department store closed in 1971. The building was completed in 1895 to designs by Emil Blichfeldt. A branch of Niels Brock Copenhagen Business College is now based in the building. A plaque on the facade commemorates that Niels Steensen lived on the site.

== History ==
=== Origins ===
Back in the 17th century, the site was made up of two smaller properties. One of them was listed in Copenhagen's first cadastre from 1689 as No. 9 in Tosenborg Quarter, owned by Jørgen Bielke. The other one was listed as No. 10, owned by Jacob Kitzerod's widow.

=== Peter de Wind ===
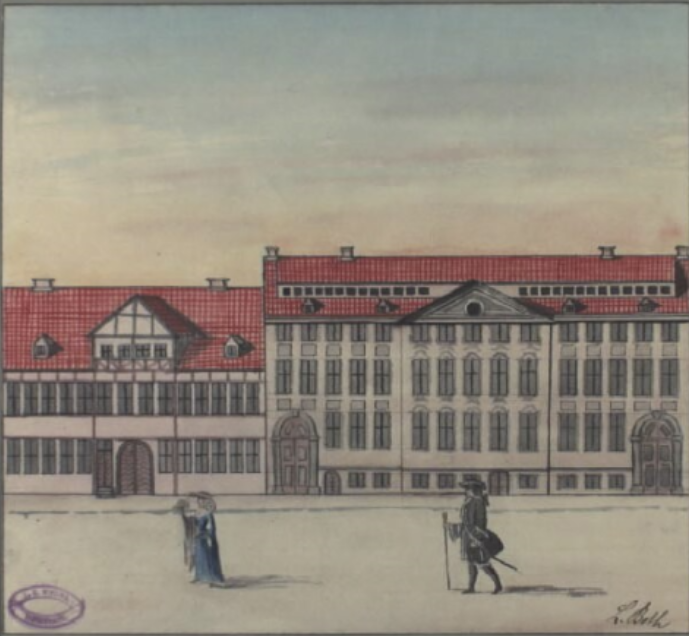
The building's facade towards Klareboderne seen to the next to the larger Stoy House (now Klareboderne 3), 1648.

The two properties were later merged into a single property. This property was listed in the new cadastre of 1756 as No. 8 in Rosenborg Quarter, owned by merchant Peter de Windt. The mentioned owner was most likely Pieter de Windt (1814-1753), a son of a plantation owner on Saint Thomas in the Danish West Indies, who had died a few years earlier. He was married twice, first to Anna Maria Benners and secondly to Marie Catherine Fabritius von Tengnagel. His second wife was the daughter of Michael Fabritius and Anna Maria Marie de Köster. After her husband's death, she was married to Jacob Frederik Schaffalitzky von Muccadel (1722-1776).

=== Tutein family ===
In 1772, No. 8 was acquired by the merchant Peter Pierre Tutein. He had previously worked for Peter de Windt and assisted his widow with the management of her husband's trading firm. Tutein was already the owner of another property on the same street, {{Jøbmagergade 13|Købmagergade No. 98]]. He lived on his old property until his death.

At the time of the 1787 census, No. 8 was let out to Lord President (Over Præsident) Gotthardt Albert Braen (1710-1788). His wife Johanne Marie Kjærskjold (1717-1750) had already died in 1750. He was the owner of Baggesvogn at Sindal. He lived in the building with four lodgers and a relatively large staff consisting of two male servants, two maids, a female cook and a coachman.

No. 8 was later taken over by Tutein's daughter Pauline and her husband Peter Tutein (a cousin). They lived in the building with their six children at the 1801 census. Their staff consisted of a male servant, a housekeeper, a female cook, a maid, a coachman and a caretaker.

In the new cadastre of 1806, Tutein's property was listed in the new cadastre of 1806 as No. 7 in Rosenborg Quarter.

=== Johan Christian Lund ===
Peter Tutein died on 11 January 1828, The property was subsequently acquired by the sulk and textile merchant Johan Christian Lund (1799-1875). He was married to Nicoline Christine Kierkegaard (1688-1832), a sister of the philosopher Søren Kierkegaard. Kierkegaard was a frequent visitor in their home on the first floor.

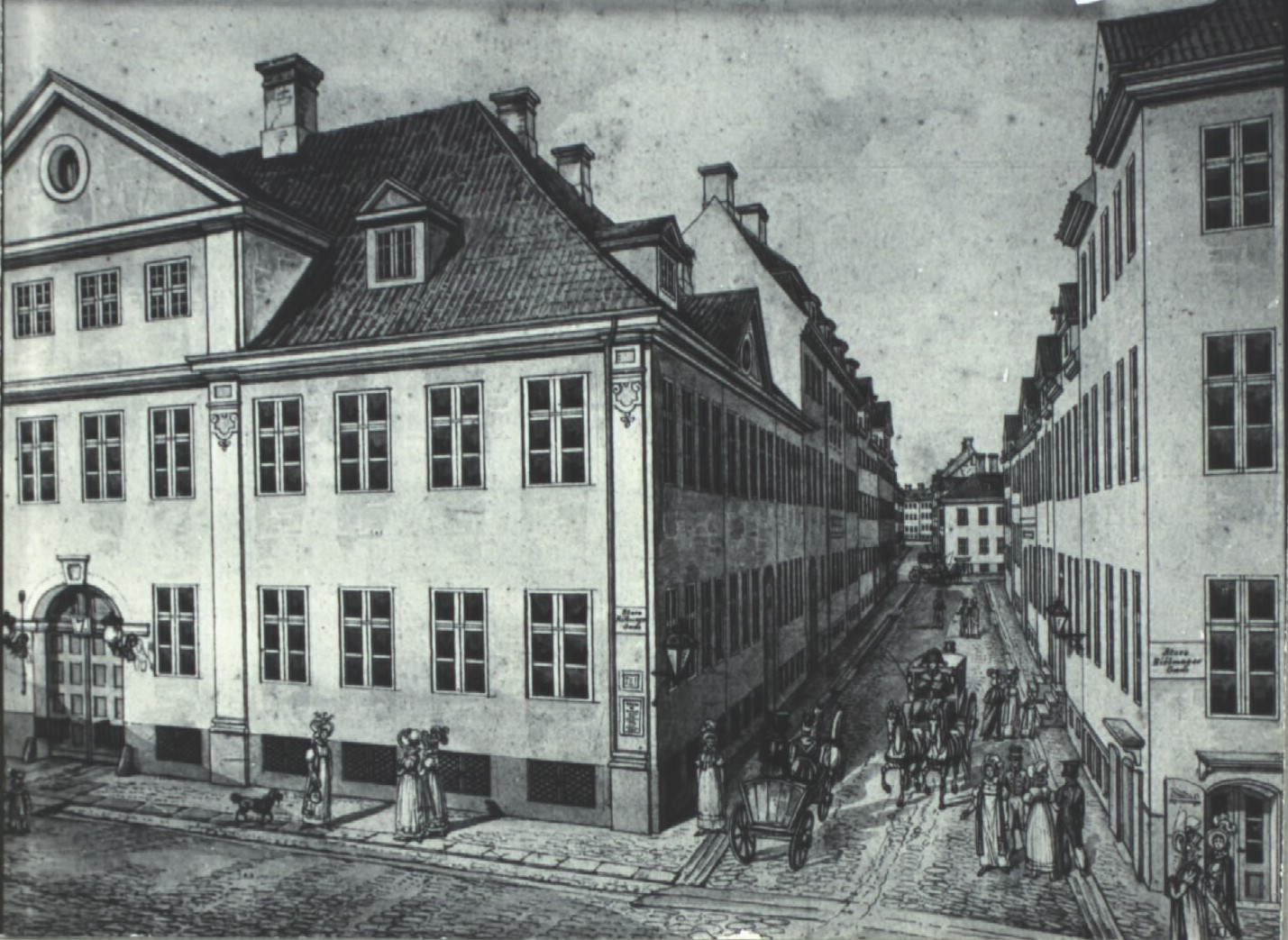
A view down Klareboderne from Købmagergade with No. 8 seen to the left.

Lund's property was home to 7+ residents at the 1840 census. Johan Christian Lund (1789-1875) resided in one of the first-floor apartment with his five children (aged 12 to 15), husjomfru Elisa Denker, three drapers (employees), an apprentice, two male servants and two maids. Michael Ditleff Bering, a grocer (urtekræmmer), resided in one of the first-floor apartments with his wife Charlotte Christine Bering (née Selmer), a grocer /employee), a grocer's apprentice, one male servant and one maid.

The ground floor was occupied by two shoemakers, two clothing retailers and a goldsmith/juvelerer. A total of 39 residents made up their five households. Jacob Jacobsen, a junk dealer, resided in one half of the basement with his wife Anna Kirstine Jacobsen (née Jepsen), their three-year-old son, a 13-year-old foster son and a male servant. Johanne Agathe Kyhl (née Grosskoff), a widow plumber, resided in the other half of the basement with her two children (aged three and five), a plumber (employee) and two plumber's apprentices. Geosepphi Barsugli, a plasterer, resided on the first floor of the rear wing with his wife Julia Concordia Barsugli, their seven children (aged 3 to 13), two plasterers (employees) and a maid.

The property was home to 60 residents at the 1850 census. Johan Christian Lund resided in one of the two first-floor apartments with his four children (aged 21 to 24), husjomfru Elise Dencker and engineering student Heinriette Reimers. Conrad Martin Julius Steincke, Wilhelm August Schneider and Carl Anton Frøde—three new silk and textile merchants—resided in the other first-floor apartment with one male servant and two maids. A total of seven households resided in the basement, including plumber Michael Soldin, goldsmith and juveleer Lauritz Falck, silk and silk and textile merchant Andreas Paulin Hein.

C. Barsugli's plaster manufactory (kalipastafabrik) was still based in the building in 1888. The Cafonia coffee roastery was also based in the building in 1999.

=== Varehuset Messen ===
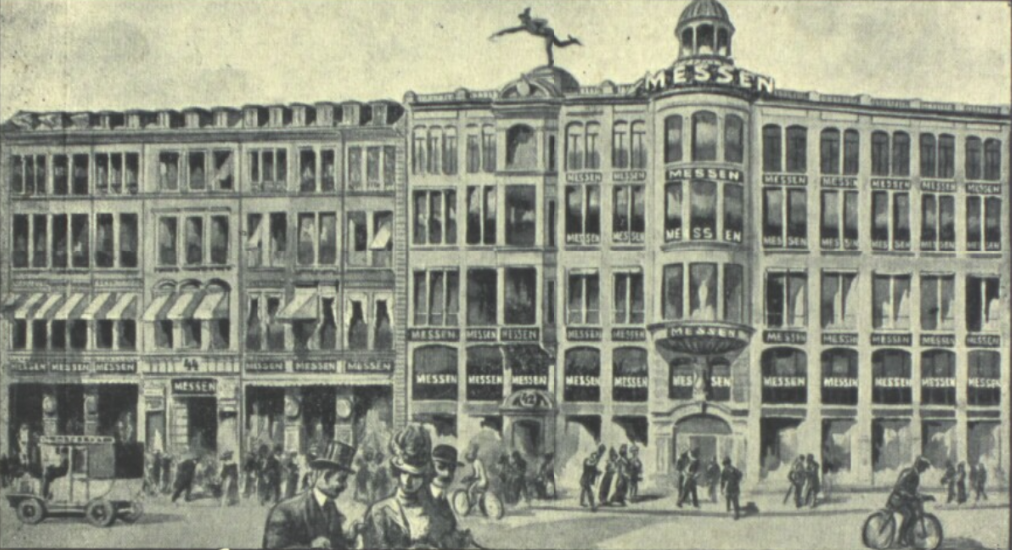
Messen in Købmagergade

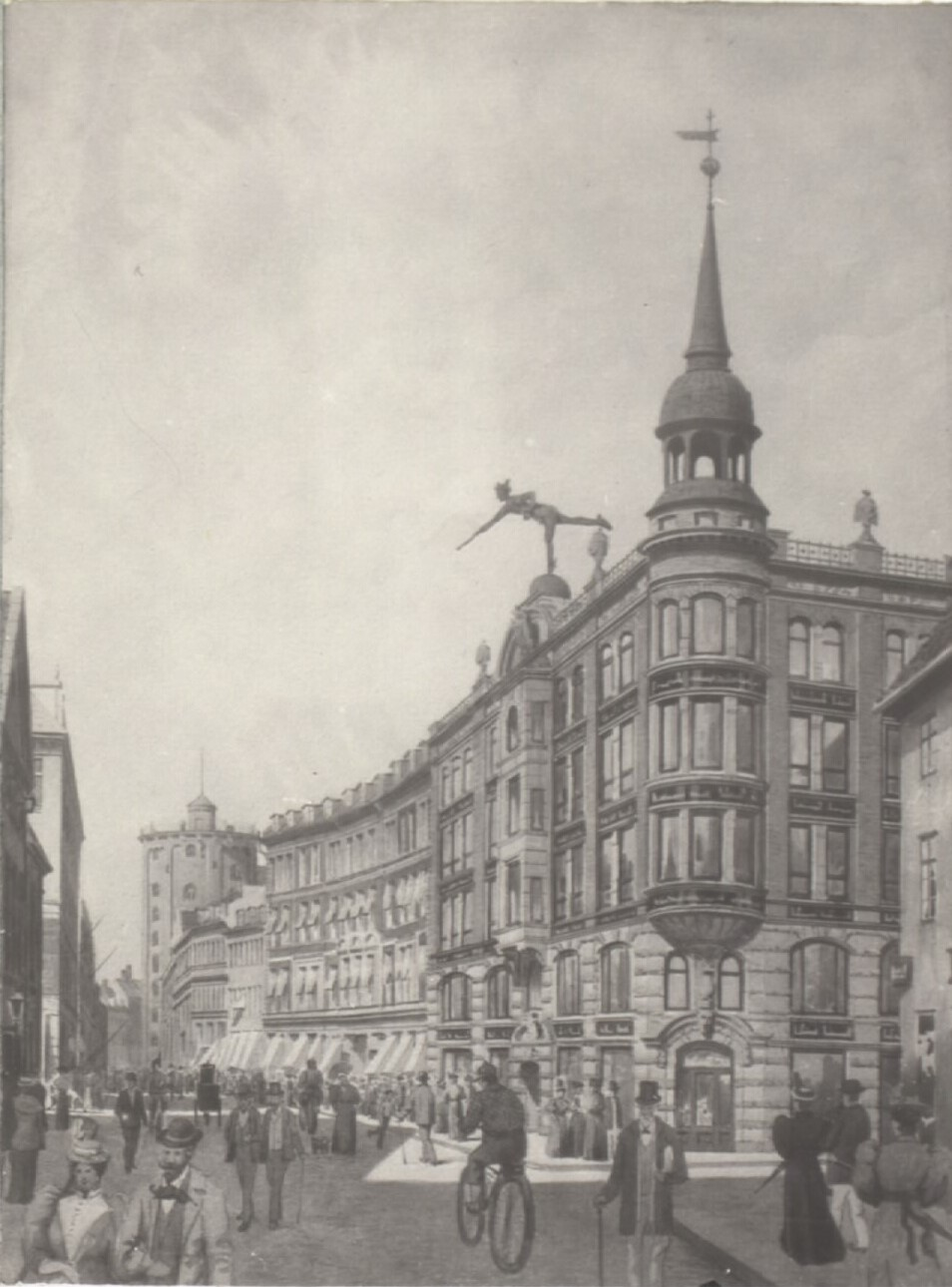
Varehuset Messen

The building was completed in 1895 to designs by Emil Blichfeldt.

Toyal court photographer Leopold Albert (1868-1949) was based on the fourth floor from 1911 to 1916.

The department store closed in 1971.

== Architecture ==
The five-story building consists of nine bays on Købmagergade and 10 bays on Klareboderne. The building is topped by a Hermes statue by Julius Schultz.

It is now used by Niels Brock Copenhagen Business College whose main building is on Kultorvet.

== Today ==
The building is now used by Niels Brock Copenhagen Business College, whose main building is on Kultorvet.
