= Emil Bærentzen =

Danish painter and lithographer (1799–1868)

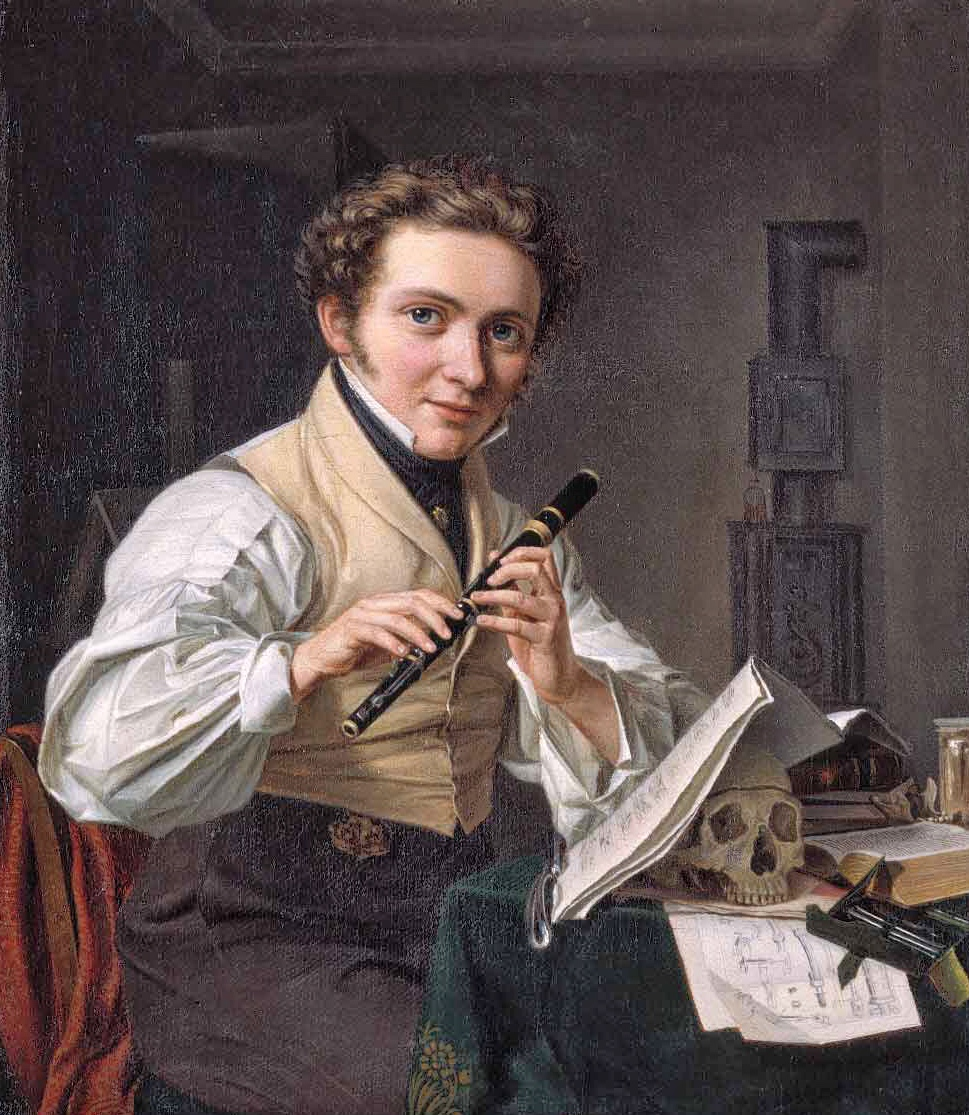
- Self-portrait 1825
- Born: 30 October 1799; Copenhagen, Denmark
- Died: 14 October 1868 (aged 68); Copenhagen, Denmark
- Education: Royal Danish Academy of Fine Arts
- Known for: Painting
- Movement: Danish Golden Age

Emilius Ditlev Bærentzen, usually known as Emil Bærentzen (30 October 1799 – 14 February 1868) was a Danish portrait painter and lithographer, active during the Golden Age of Danish Painting. He founded Em. Bærentzen & Co.

== Biography ==
Born in Copenhagen on 30 October 1799, Bærentzen served an apprenticeship at the pharmacy in Nykøbing Sjælland but then travelled to Christiansted on the then Danish island of St. Croix in the West Indies where he worked in one of the government offices. Five years later he returned to Denmark and, after qualifying as a lawyer, moved into painting which until then he had practiced as a hobby. In 1821, he entered the Danish Academy where he studied under Christoffer Wilhelm Eckersberg. He was awarded the little silver medal in 1826 and the large silver medal the following year. He soon became one of Copenhagen's most popular portrait painters. His paintings were characterized by an elegant but sober style, free of psychological trimmings in accordance with contemporary practice. One of his most successful works is the portrait of Søren Kierkegaard's fiancée Regine Olsen (1840).

In 1837, he began to specialize in lithography with H.L. Danschell who managed his deceased father-in-law's oilcloth factory where stones were used to colour the fabric. This led to the founding of a lithographic company, Emilius Bärentzen & Co.s litografiske Institut, which later became Hoffensberg, Jespersen & Fr. Trap. Bærentzen made lithographs of many of the period's most important figures. He continued to work both as a lithographer and artist until 1866 when he painted the portrait of Cosmus Bræstrup for the Freemasons lodge in Helsingør. He died on 14 February 1868.

== Selected works ==
Bærentzen was a very popular and productive artist. Among his works are:

- Familien Winther (1827)
- Familien Tutein (1828)
- Det Schramske familiebillede (1829)
- Anders Ancker (1829)
- En 110 år gammel invalid (1833)
- C.W. Eckersberg (1835)
- Slotspræst Søren Schiødte (1836)
- Søren Ludvig Tuxen (1837)
- Adam Oehlenschläger (1839)
- Regine Olsen (1840)
- Augusta Nielsen (c. 1840)
- Johanne Luise Heiberg (1841)
- Frederik VI på lit de parade (1841)
- Christian VIII (1842)
- Dronn. Caroline Amalie (1842)
- Laurids Skau (1844)
- Johan Fr. Schlegel (c. 1847)
- Operasangerinden Catharine Simonsen f. Rysslaender (1844-45)

== Gallery ==
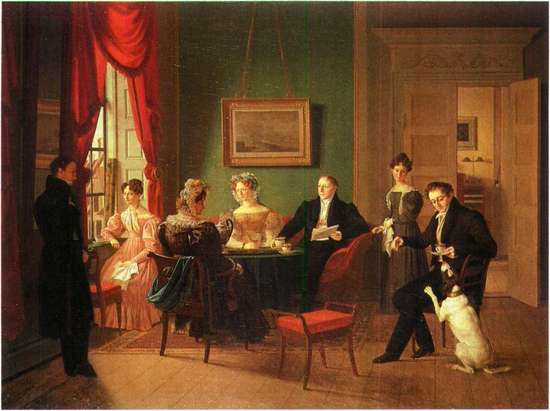
Det Schramske familiebillede (1829)

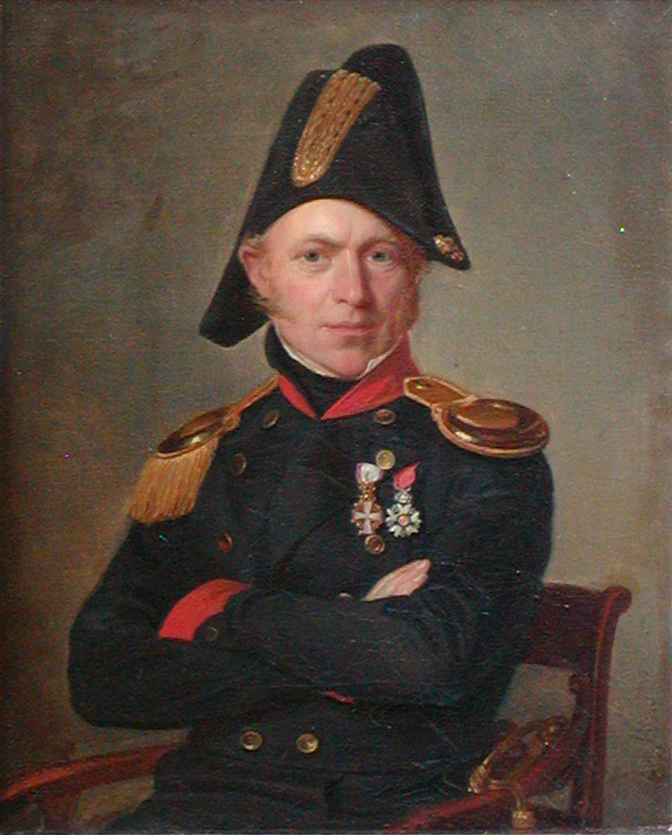
Søren Ludvig Tuxen (1837)

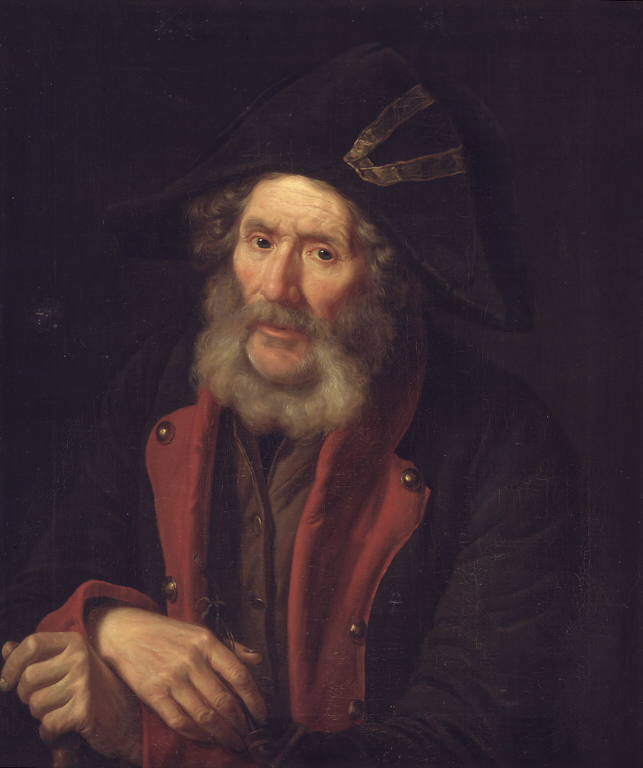
En gammel invalid. Portræt af en soldat (1828)

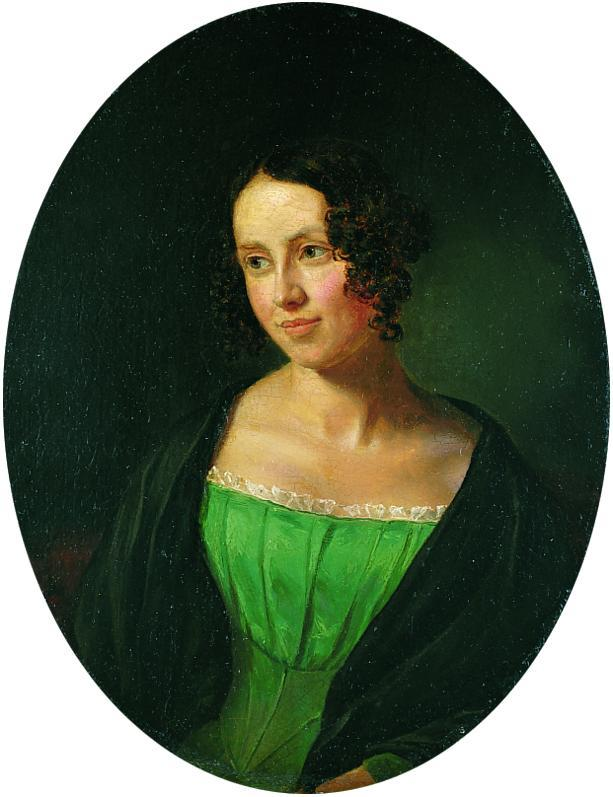
Regine Olsen (1840

== See also ==
- Peter Gemzøe
