= Em. Bærentzen & Co. =

Danish lithography workshop and publisher (1837–c. 1874)

Em. Bærentzen & Co., also known as Em. Bærentzen's lithographiske Institut or Em. Bærentzen & Comp., was a leading lithography workshop and publisher based in Copenhagen, Denmark. It was founded in 1837 and merged into Det Hoffensbergske Etablissement in 1874.

== History ==
The company was founded in 1837 as Em. Bærentzen & Co.'s Lithografiske Institut by the painter Emilius Ditlev Bærentzen in collaboration with the manufacturer Henrik Leonhard Danchell.

In 1843, Danchell sold Frederik Emil Winning a share of the business, and in 1845, Brentzen was bought out. When it was sold to Jens Peter Trap and printer Adolph Bull in 1856, it changed ownership once more. Trap became the sole owner of the enterprise when Bull died in 1874. He ceded it to his son who, in September 1874, merged it into Det Hoffensbergske Etablissement in 1874.

== Notable works ==
Notable works include Portefeuillens lithografiske Bilag, Pantheon, Samling af berømte danske Mænd og Kvinder I—III with text by J. P. Trap, Danmark i Billeder, Frederiksborg (in six large color prints), Danske Mindesmærker published by a company, Danmark i Billeder fra Land og Sø in color, and others.

It began Prospecter af danske Herregaarde which was later completed by I.W. Tegner & Kittendorff.

== See also ==
- Kittendorff & Aagaard
