= Det Hoffensbergske Etablissement =

Danish publishing house and printing business

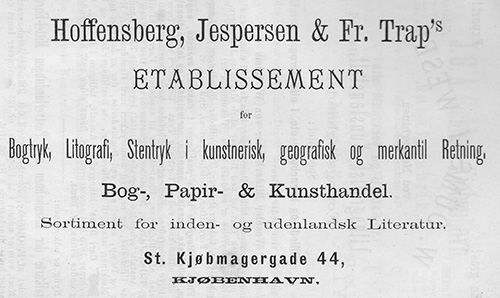
Advert for Hoffensberg, Jespersen & Trap (1876).

Det Hoffensbergske Etablissement was a publishing house and printing business based at Kronprinsessegade 28 in Copenhagen, Denmark.

== History ==
The company was founded 1855 when Julius Hoffensberg (1828-1895) took over a small lithography workshop after a deceased brother. The firm was based at Kronprinsensgade 6.

In 1874 this company merged with Otto Schwarts Eftf.s Boghandel (founded 1865) and Em. Bærentzen & Co. (founded 1838, owned by Jens Peter Trap) under the name Hoffensberg, Jespersen & Trap. The book printing business G. S. Eibes Bogtrykkeri (founded 1859) was also part of the merger. In 1875, Hoffensberg, Jespersen & Trap purchased the former Waisen House at Købmagergade 44.

I. P. Trap's son, Frederik Trap, took over his father's share over the company later that same year. The name of the company was changed to Hoffenberg & Trap when E. Jespersen left the company in 1878. Trap died in 1882, leaving Hoffensberg as the sole proprietor until he was joined by Alfred Grut 1887. When Hoffensberg returned in 1888, Grut was instead joined by P. Poulsen but he died the following year. In 1890, the company was converted into a limited company (aktieselskab).

== Location ==
The company was based at Kronprinsessegade 28 in Copenhagen.

== See also ==
- Hagen & Sievertsen
