= Johannes Christensen Meller =

Danish brewer, burgermaster and President of Copenhagen's Magistracy)

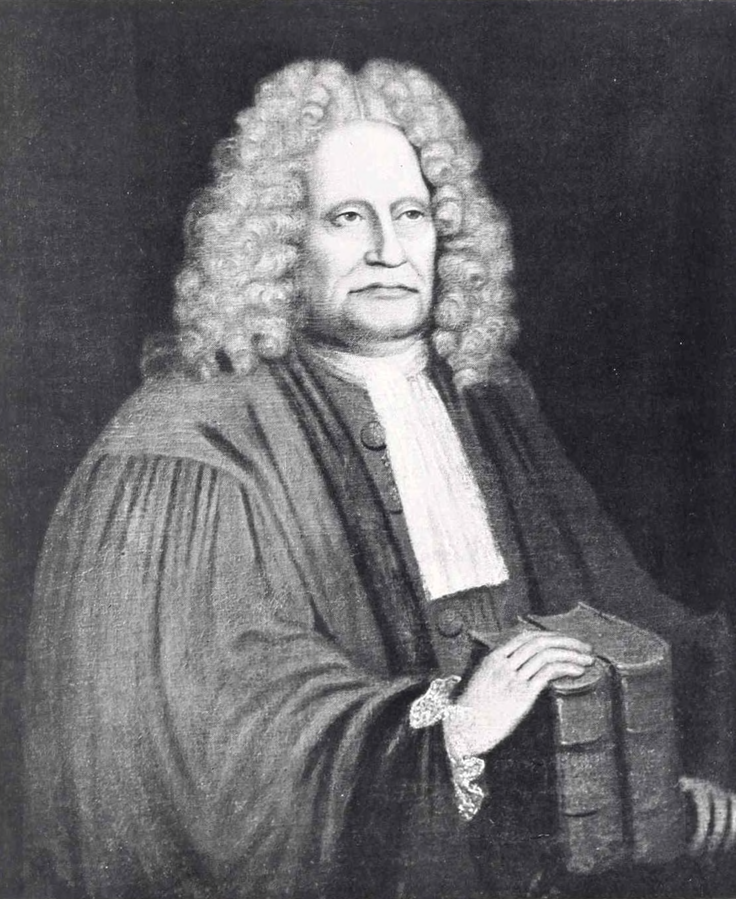

President of Copenhagen's Magistracy
- In office 1713–1724
- Monarch: Frederick IV of Denmark
- Preceded by: Hans Hansen Nansen
- Succeeded by: Johann Hermann Schrader

Personal details
- Born: c. 1650
- Died: 10 October 1724 Copenhagen, Denmark
- Occupation: President of Copenhagen

Johannes Christensen Meller (c. 1650 – 10 November 1724) was a Danish brewer who served as head (stadshauptmand) of Copenhagen's Civil Guard (1701–1713) and President of Copenhagen's Magistracy (1713–1724). Prior to the latter appointment, he had also served as burgermaster (1710–1713), councilman and one of the city's 32 Men. He was one of the largest property owners in Christianshavn.

== Early life ==
Meller was born in around 1650. Almost nothing is known about his early life. He may be identical to a Meller who served as cornet at a cavalry regiment in Scania in 1677. In c. 1679, he was granted citizenship as a brewer in Copenhagen. He was also part of the management of the city's Water Commission.

== Career ==
In 1682, he became churchwarden (kirkeværge) of the still-under-construction Church of Our Saviour.. 1687 saw him elected as one of the city's 32 Men. In 1692, he was appointed councilman. From 1697, he oversaw the construction of the Garrison Church on Sankt Annø Plads. He was also used as a member of a number of other commissions.

In 1700, when Denmark was threatened by a new attack from Sweden, he was charged with assisting stadshauptmand Niels Enevoldsen. In this capacity, he was instrumental in improving the training of Copenhagen's Civil Guard (Borgervæbningen) and the city's fortifications. He unsuccessfully tried to convince commandant Hans Schack (1642-1706) to attack the Swedish troops. In 1701, he succeeded Enevoldsen as stadshauptmand.

In 1710, Meller was appointed burgermaster. During the 1711 Copenhagen Outbreak of Plague, he played a key role in the efforts to control the catastrophic effects of the decease. In 1713, he was promoted to President of Copenhagen's Magistracy.

Meller was appointed Justitsråd in 1709, etatsråd 1713 and Konferensråd in 1722.

== Property ==
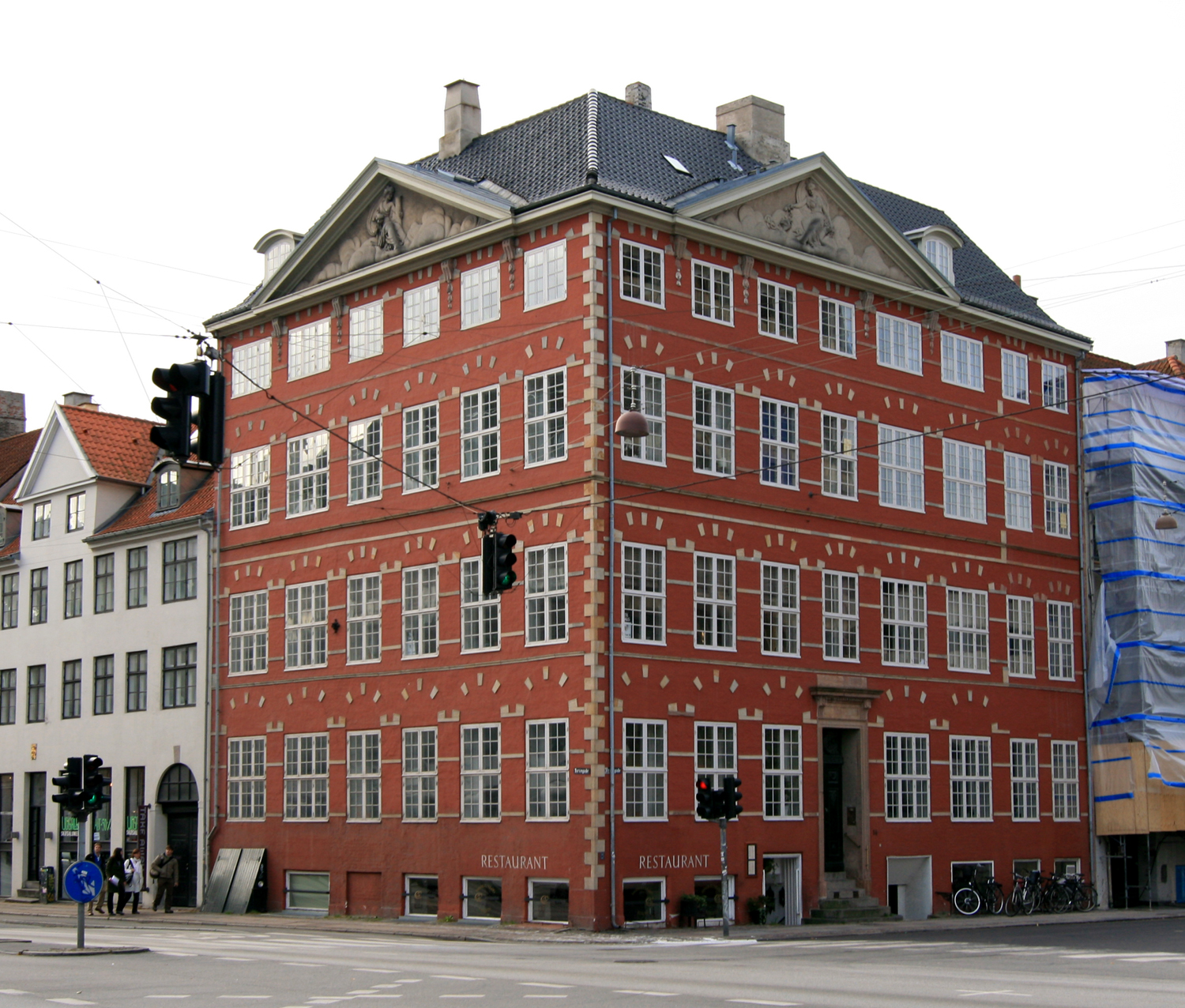
Meller's home from 1603 to 1714, now known as the Rohde House after a later owner.

Meller's first property (home and brewery) was located at the corner of Strandgade and Bådmandsstræde (No. 31, Christianshavn Quarter). In 1703, he moved to the Rohde House at the corner of Strandgade and Torvegade (No. 15b) He owned the house until 1714. In 1714, he bought No. 101, Frimand's Quarter on Købmagergade.

In 1719, he bought a soap manufacttory on Langebrogade. His other properties in Christianshavn included:

- Dronningensgade No. 151 (1676-1717)
- Kongensgade No, 54 (1576-1578)
- No. 103 (c. 1689-c. 1694, No. 103A: 1702; No. 103B: 1702-1707, 1714-1714)
- Dronningensgade No. 149 (1694-1721)
- Kongensgade No. 39 (1696-1717)
- Lille Sankt Annegade No. 79 (1703-1717)
- No. 104 (1702-1717)
- Dronningensgade/Christianshavns TorvNo. 245a (1710-1716)
- Kongensgade No. 32 (1713-1714)
- Lille Sankt Annegade No. 81 (1714-1723)
- Søndervoldstræde101 No. 118 (1714-1724)
- Dronningensgade No. 144 (1715-1824)
- Dronningensgade No. 147b /1716-1822)
- Dronningensgade No. 129b (1722-1723)
- Christianshavns Torv No. 249b (1724)

== Personal life ==
In 1676, Meller was married to Anna Henriksdatter Hojer (died 1722). They were the parents of two daughters. Johannes Christensen Meller died on 10 November 1724. He is buried in the Church of Our Lady.

The elder daughter Anne Dorthe Meller (1677 - 1722) was married twice, first to ship captain Nicolaj Espen Povelsen (Paulsen) (1690-1760) and then to parish priest in Asminderød and Grønholt Laurids Lauridsen Grøngaard. (1663 - 1721). The younger daughter Maria Johansdatter Meller (1679-1705) was married to merchant Herman Valør. The grandson Johannes Valeur was named after him and adopted his coat of artms.
