= Johannes Valeur =

Danish judge and mayor of Copenhagen

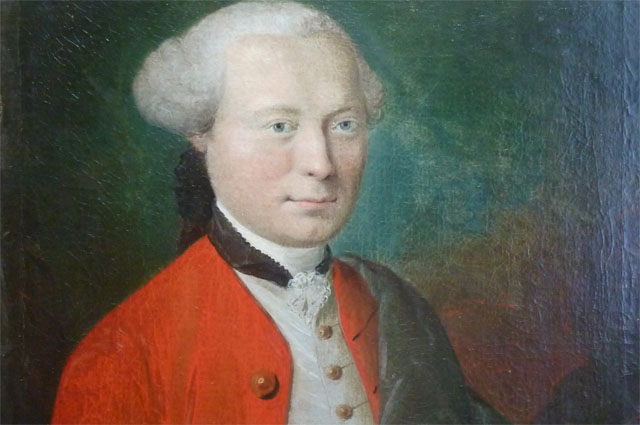
Johannes Valeur.

Johannes Valeur (23 February 1701 – 20 September 1771) was a Danish judge and mayor of Copenhagen. A contemporary rumour had it that he was the real father of poet Johannes Ewald.

== Early life and education ==
Valeur was born on 23 February 1701 in Copenhagen, the son of silk-and-canvas merchant Herman Walør (Wallør, 1662-1726) and Maria Johansdatter Meller (died 1705). He was named after his maternal grandfather, Magistrate President Johannes Christensen Meller, upon whose death in 1724 he inherited a large sum of money. Valeur's father was first time married in 1692 to Barbara Haagensdatter (1659-1697) and third time married in 1719 to Margrethe Christiansdatter Ottesen.

The Valør family's home was on Strandgade (No. 19, now part of Strandgade 26) in Christianshavn. Valeur's father had bought the property in 1700. Valeur matriculated from Metropolitanskolen in 1720. He earned a theology degree from the University of Copenhagen in 1822. He later worked as a tutor on Samsø. In 1724, he embark on a Grand Tour abroad. He spent most of the time in France.

== Career ==
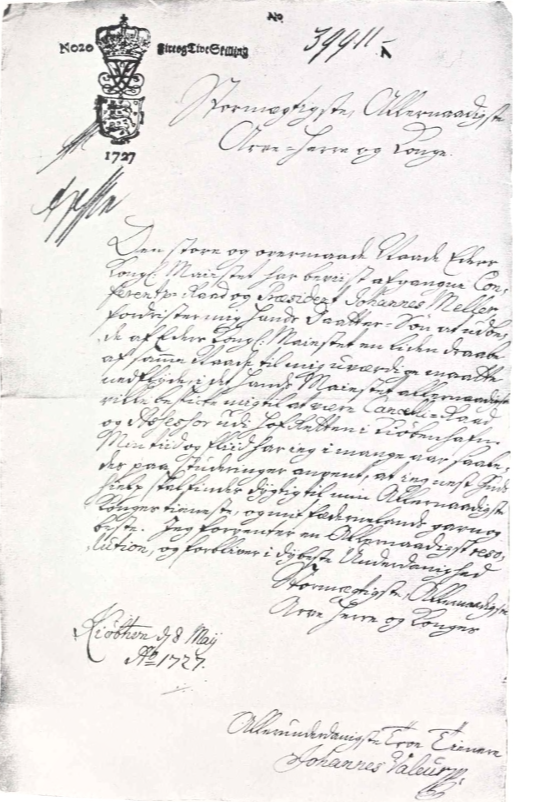
Valeur's application for a position as judge at Hofretten

After his return to Copenhagen, in 1727 Valeur was appointed as a judge at Hofretten. In 1729, he was appointed as vice councilman in Copenhagen. In 1729, he was appointed as councilman. He played an important role in the work with rebuilding the city after the Copenhagen Fire of 1728. In 1741, he was appointed as a Supreme Court justice. In 1750 he became deputy burgermaster. In 1771, he was fired from that post when Struense dissolved Copenhagen's Magistracy.

In 1757-62, Valeur also served as one of the directors of the Royal Danish Theatre. He translated a number of plays from French. He was one of the largest shareholders of the Danish West India Company. In 2729, he was involved in the establishment of the company's sugar refinery in Copenhagen.

He was awarded the title of Kancelliråd in 1727, Virkelig justitsråd in 1739, etatsråd in 1749 and Virkelig etatsråd in 1767.

== Personal life ==
Valeur was married to Charlotte Sophie Bülcke Kellermann (née Bulke, 1696-1758) on 20 March 1726. She was the widow of merchant Christian Kellermann (died 1723). Her parents were Peter Bulke. She gave birth to six sons and four daughters. In her first marriage, Charlotte was the mother of son Peter Kellermann.

In 1727, he bought a property on Østergade (No. 34, Købmager Quarter). On 11 December 1752, he sold the property for 5,500 Danish rigsdaler. His new home was a rented apartment in supercargo Peter Gram's property on Købmagergade now Købmagergade 11). In 1740, he had also acquired the country house Nebbegård at Blovstrød. Rumour had it that he was the father of Johannes Ewald.

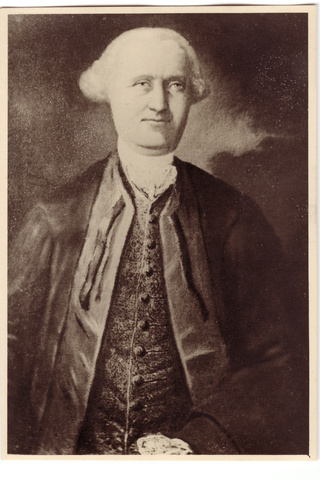
Valeur's eldest son, Johannes Meller Valeur (1726-1808).

A contemporary rumour had it that Valeur had an affair with clergy Peter Ewald's wife Maria and that he was the real father of poet Johannes Ewald. The Rwald's summer residence was located close to Nebbegaard. The source of the rumour is believed to have been Nicolai Eigtved's wife, Christine, née Walther, who had close ties to the Ewald family.

Valeur died on 20 September 1771 at Nebbegaard, He was survived by the following children:

- Johannes Meller Valeur (1726–1808), customs officer in Aalborg
- Herrmann Christian Valeur (1731–1791), postmaster
- Andreas Valeur (1733–1811)
- Peter Valeur (1734–1760)
- Maria Elisabeth Valeur (1735–1736)
- Mariana Valeur (1739–1820), married Christian Hansen
