= Sigvert Grubbe House =

Listed building in Copenhagen

- Sivgert Grubbes Gård
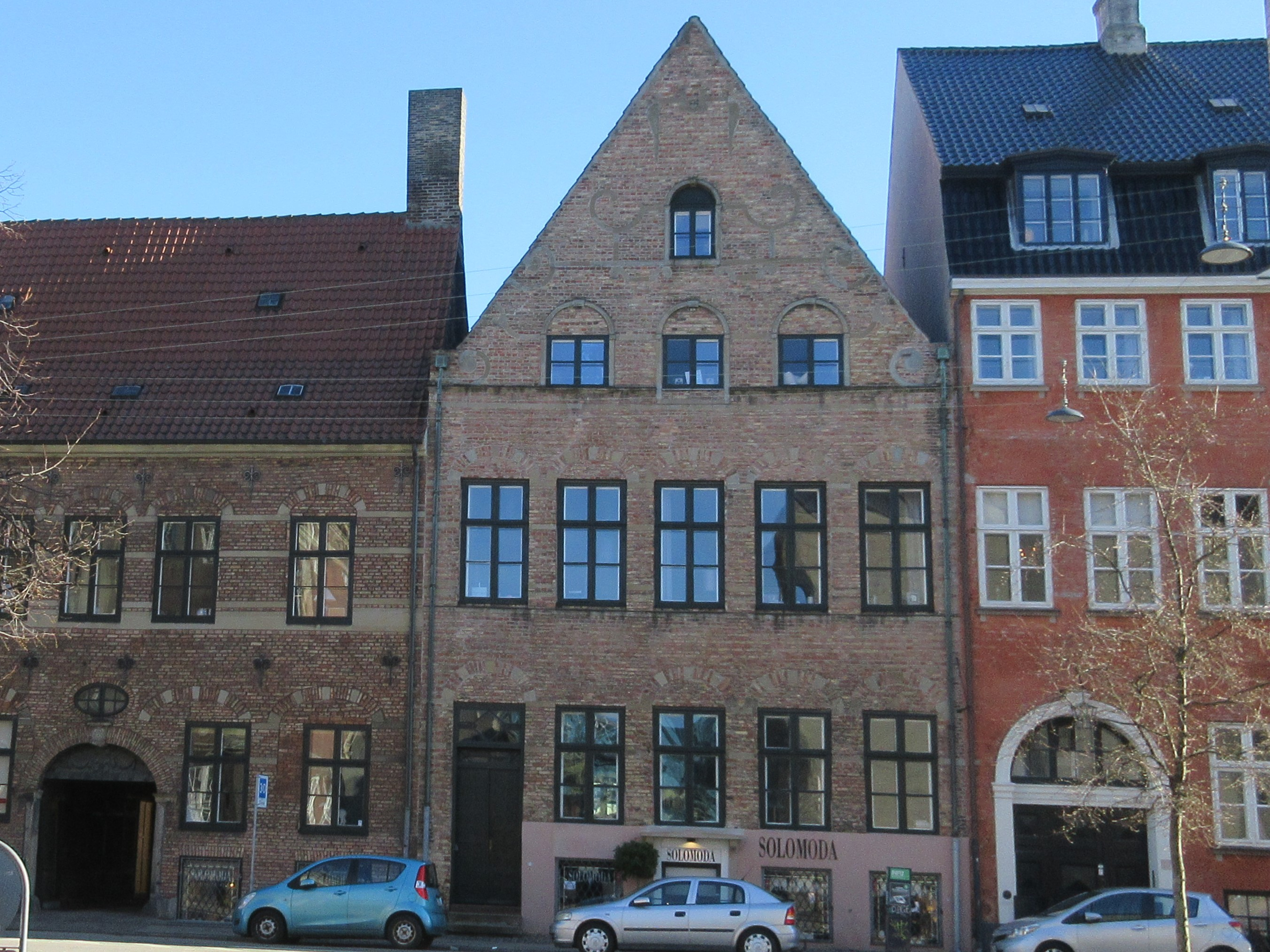
- Interactive map of the Sigvert Grubbe House area

General information
- Location: Copenhagen, Denmark
- Coordinates: 55°40′26.76″N 12°35′24.72″E
- Completed: 1620s
- Renovated: 1817–18, 1943

The Sigvert Grubbe House (Danish: Sivgert Grubbes Gård) is a Renaissance style townhouse situated at Strandgade 28 in the Christianshavn neighborhood of central Copenhagen, Denmark. The property comprises the building at Wildersgade 41 on the other side of the block as well as a half-timbered building separating two central courtyards from each other. The apartment on the first floor features a number of murals attributed to Nicolai Abildgaard. The entire complex was listed in the Danish registry of protected buildings and places in 1918. It takes its name after its first owner, Sigbert Grubbe, a favourite of Christian IV. It was later owned by Jacob Benjamin Italiaender, a Sphardi Jew, who established a tobacco manufactory as well as a private synagogue in the yard. The painter Peder Severin Krøyer grew up in the building in the 1860s.

== History ==
=== 17th and early 18th centuries ===
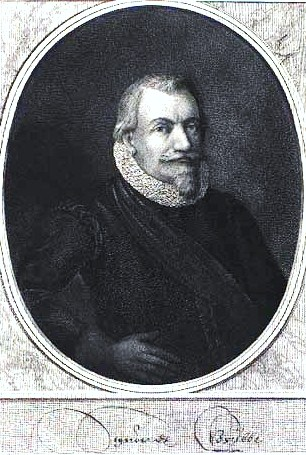
Sigvert Gruppe

The present building on the site was constructed in the 1620s. It was part of a row of three identical townhouses. The two others were later merged into what is now Strandgade 26. The first owner was Sivert Grubbe (1566-1636). He had escorted a young Christian IV on his journey to the North Cape. He later also escorted him on a number of other journeys. He was rewarded with a number of royal fiefs, including Jungshoved on Zealand and Malmøhus, Lundegård, Dalby Kloster and Højby in Scania.

Grubbe's former property in Strandgade was listed as No. 21 in Copenhagen's first cadastre of 1689. It was at that time owned by brewer Peter Vinberg.

The property was owned by brewer Philip Gardelin from 1723 to 1728. He was also strongly involved in the Danish West Indies Company, both as a merchant and as the bookkeeper of the company. In 1733, he was appointed as governor of Saint Thomas in the Danish West Indies. Frederik Holmsted, who served as director of the Danish West Indies Company, was also a resident of the building.

=== Jacob Italiener Benjamin & Gebroders, 1749–1828 ===
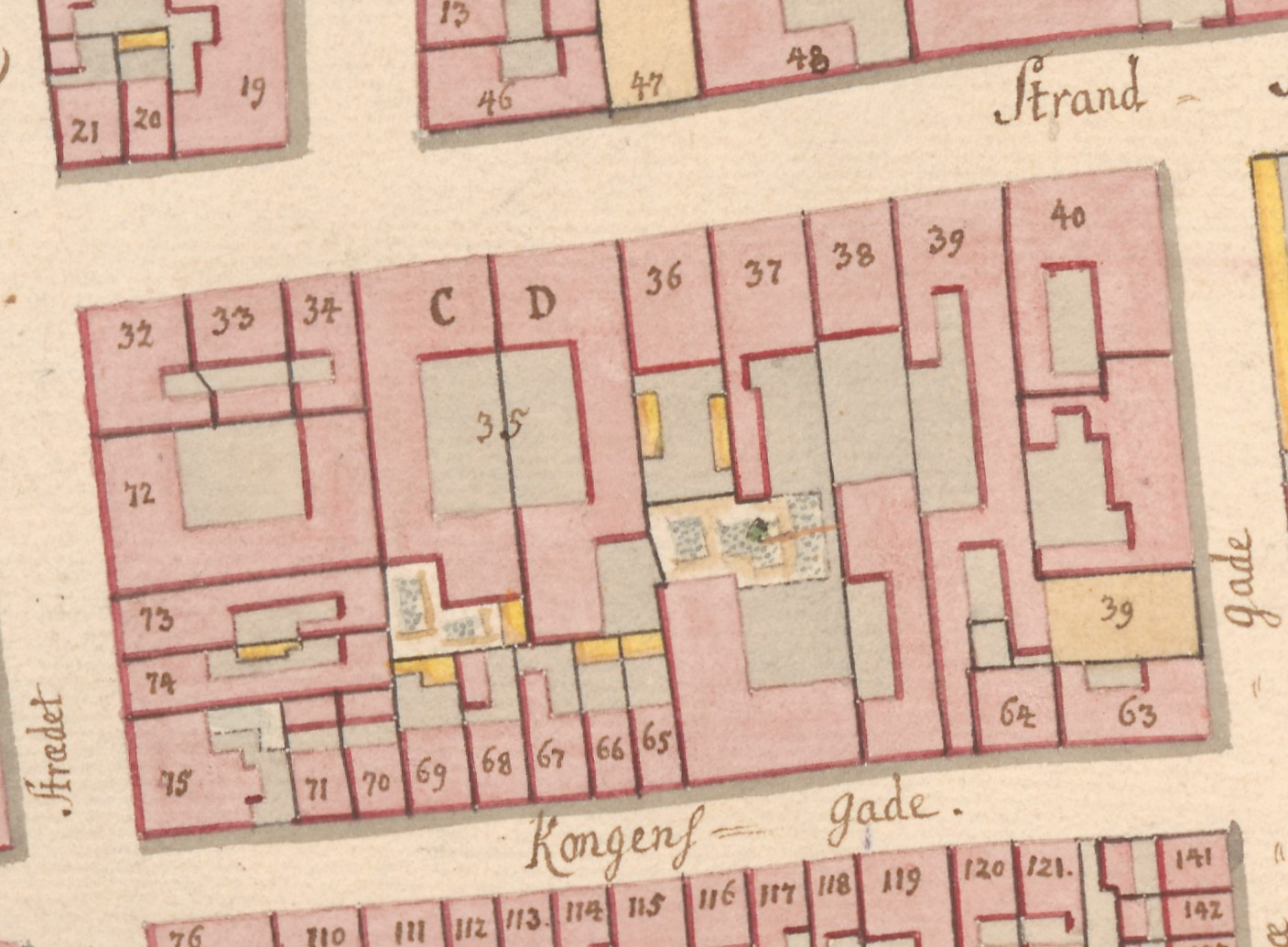
No. 38 seen in a detail from Christian Gedde's map of Christianshavn Quarter, 1757

On 20 December 1745, No. 21 was acquired by Jacob Italiaender. Born in around 1704 in Amsterdam, he came from a Sephardi Jewish family of tobacco manufacturers. His parents were Benjamin Italiaender and Judith Gitche Jacob Littau. On 27 September 1727, he was married to his cousin Mariana Isaac Italiaender. They moved to Copenhagen in around 1743. On 14 November, he was under the company name Jacob Italiener Benjamin & Gebroders granted a royal privilege to establish a tobacco factory in Christianshavn and Aalborg. The branch in Christianshavn opened the same year and was initially located in Langebrogade. The one in Aalborg did not open until around 1759 and had closed again before 1773. Tax records seem to indicate that he remained a resident of his old property in Langebrogade until 1749. His property in Strandgade was listed as No. 38 in the new cadastre of 1756. Italiaender established a private synagogue on his property. It is believed that it was located in a building on the rear with access from Kongensgade (now Wildersgade).

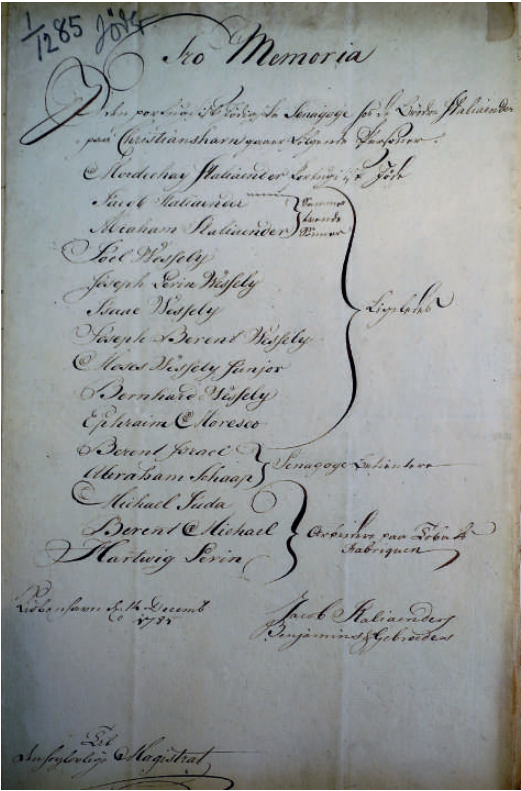
List of members of the congregation associated with the synagogue on the property, 1785

The faith of Jacob Italiaender and his wife is uncertain. No burial place is thus recorded at the Jewish Cemetery in Copenhagen or in Amsterdam.

The property in Strandgade was some time between 1762 and 1785 passed to Mordechai Jacob Italiaender. Born in around 1736 at Nijkerk. he was the son of Jacob Mordechai Italiaender and Rebecca Benjamin Italiaender. He was married to his cousin Reina Abraham Italiaender (born 26 December 1734), daughter of Abraham Benjamin Italiaender and Anna Hindele Isaac Italiaender and sister of Benjamin Italiaender.

Mordechay Italiaender resided on his property with eight other people at the 1787 census. The other residents were his wife Reina Italiaender, their sons Jacob and Abraham Italiaender, his sister Rachel Italiaender, his niece Rabeca Moresco, bookkeeper Isaac Wessely, floor clerk Martha Moses and one maid.

The 64-year-old Mordechay Italiender had become a widower by the 1801 census. He lived in the building with his two sons Jacob and Abraham, their wives, Jacob's one-year-old daughter Amalie and two maids. The property was listed as No. 44 in the new cadastre of 1806. It was at that time owned by Jacob Italiaender. His brother Abraham Italiaender resided in the building until his death in 1827.

=== Mortensen family, 1830s–1910s ===
On 4 August 1828, Jacob Italiener Benjamin & Gebroders sold the property to the king. The property was later sold to a haulier named Mortensen. It was after his death passed to his wife Marie Christine Mortensen. She continued the family's transport business until their eldest son was old enough to take over the operations. The painter Frederik Sødring (1809-1862) was a resident of the building in around 1839.

The property was home to 32 residents in five households at the 1840 census. Marie Christine Mortensen (née Hansen) resided on the ground floor with her four children (aged 12 to 17), two unmarried sisters-in-law and two maids. Gerhard Heiberg Wolff, a merchant (grosserer) associated with the Royal Greenland Trading Department, resided on the first floor with his wife Ane Magrete Hansen, their three children (aged 12 to 22) and one maid. Martha Maria Rousing, a 63-year-old widow with a pension, resided on the second floor with her daughter Mariane Maria Rousing and one maid. Ane Rasmussen, another widow, resided in the basement with her daughter Dorthea Maria Magdalene Rasmussen. Jens Petersen, an employee in the family's haulier's business, resided in the rear wing with his wife Ane Kristine, their three children (aged one to six) and seven other employees as lodgers.

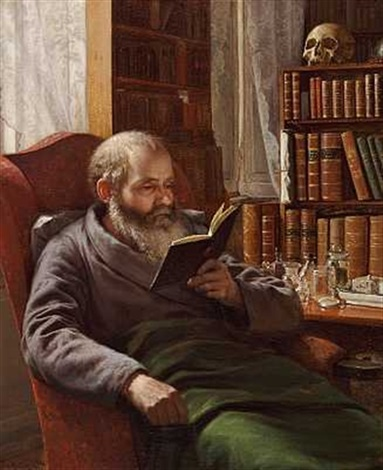
Henrik Krøyer, painted by P. S. Krøyer

The zoologist Henrik Nikolai Krøyer (1799-1870) was a resident of the building from 1845 to 1847 and again from 1864 to 1870. From 1860 to 1863, he was a resident of Wildersgade 43. His adopted son was the later painter Peder Severin Krøyer.

The property was home to 33 residents at the 1845 census. Marie Mortensen was still running the family's haulier's business from her home on the ground floor. She lived there with her four children, one maid and six employees. Henrik Nikolai Krøyer (1799-1870) resided on the first floor with his wife Cecilie (née Gjesdal) and one maid. Johan Tarnen, helmsman of the lightvessel Dragen, resided on the second floor with his wife Suise Lihme, their one-year-old daughter and one maid. Carl Nielsen, a workman, resided in the basement with his wife Marie Christensen, their three children (aged two to five) and one maid. Niels Christiansen, an employee in the haulier's business, resided on the ground floor of the rear wing with his wife Luise Marie Nielsen and their four-year-old daughter. Søren Poulsen, another employee in the haulier's business, resided on the first floor of the rear wing with his wife Dorthea Andersen and their three children (aged one to 10).

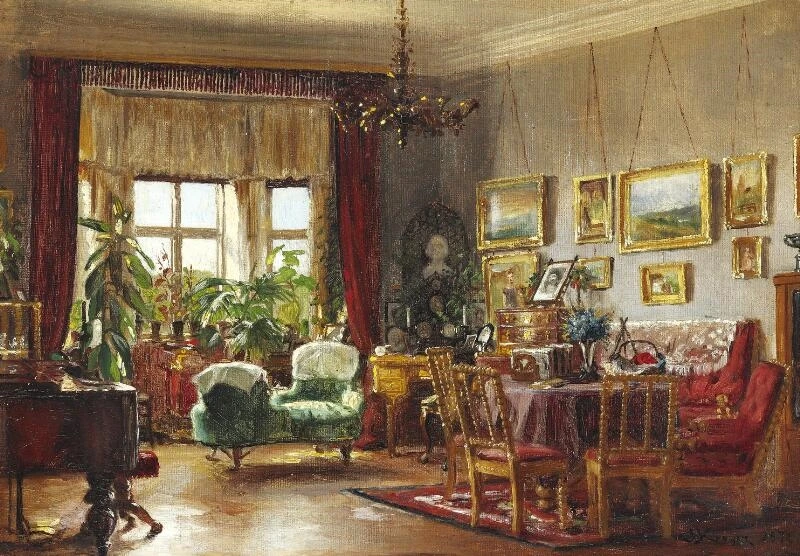
P. S. Krøyer: The Artist's Childhood Home in Strandgade 30, 1872

The property was home to 28 residents in five households at the 1850 census. Marie Christine Mortensen resided on the ground floor with three of her children, three coachmen and two maids. Two widows resided in the first floor apartment with a lodger and a maid. T.F. Thomsen, a merchant trading on Iceland, resided on the second floor with his wife Berthine Thomsen (née Mortensen, one of the sisters-in-law from the 1840 census), their one-year-old son and one maid. Niels Jensen, an employee in the haulier's business, resided in the basement with his wife Ellen Marie, their two-year-old son and one maid. Søren Sørensen, a policeman, resided in the rear wing with his wife Caroline Margrethe (née Mortensen, the other sister-in-law from the 1840 census), their four children (aged one to six) and his mother Maren Sørensen (née Kruse).

Christian Ludvig Lundbye (1812-1873), a military officer and later Defence Minister, was among the residents of the building in around 1850.

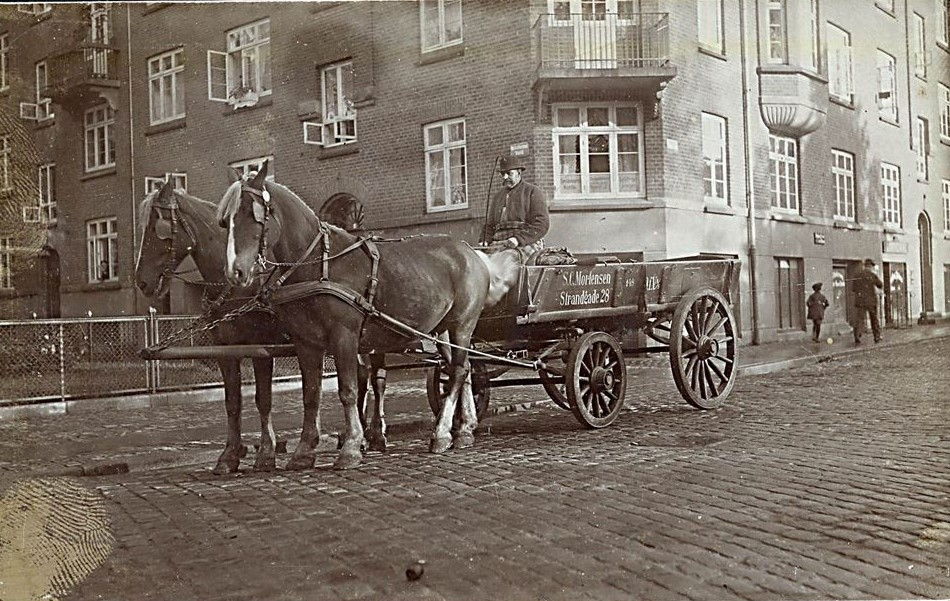
One of S. C. Mortensen's carriages in Christianshavn

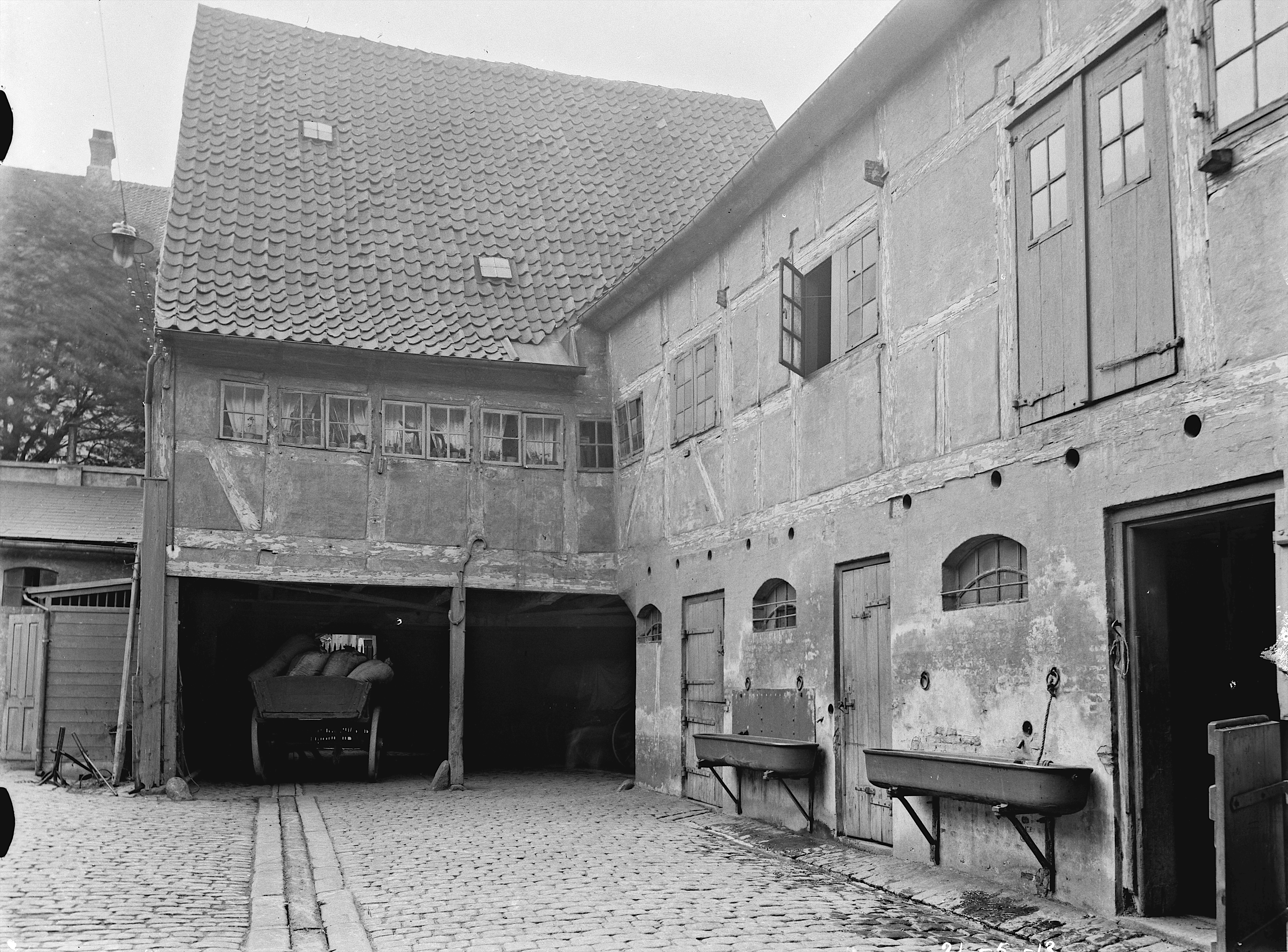
Wildersgade 41 in 1913

Strandgade 28 was home to 24 residents at the 1860 census. Søren Carl Mortensen, who had now taken over the family business, resided on the ground floor with his wife Adamine Sophie (née Hviid), their three children (aged one to five), his sister-in-law Marie Hansine Hviid, one male servant and two maids. Thomas Frederik Thomsen, who was now trading on the Faroe Islands, resided on the first floor with his wife Benthine Marie Hansine Thomsen (née Mortensen), their five children (aged four to 10) and one maid. His mother had moved up to the second floor. Jens Christian Christensen, an innkeeper (værtshusholder), resided in the basement with his wife Karen Jensdatter, their two children (aged one and four) and two lodgers (coachmen in Mortensen's business). Jens Berendt, a workman, resided in the rear wing with his wife Wilhelmine Berendt (née Saabek), their two foster children (aged five and 12) and one lodger.

The property was listed as Strandgade 28&Wildersgade 41 in 1859 when house numbering by street was introduced as a supplement to the old cadastral numbers by quarter. Wildersgade 39 was also acquired by Mortensen. In 1873, he constructed a new side wing and rear wing as stables and premises.

Strandgade 28 was home to 40 residents at the 1880 census. Søren Carl Mortensen resided on the ground floor with his wife, four daughters and one maid. Jens Erlandsen Petersen, a military officer (stabssergant), resided on the second floor with his wife Marie Emilie Petersen and their three children (aged 14 to 22). Lovise Olsen (née Mortensen), proprietor of the tavern in the basement, resided in the associated dwelling with her daughter Laura Marie Olsen and three lodgers. Bodil Nielsen, a widow, resided in the rear wing with her daughter Anna Vilhelmine Nielsen and one lodger (coachman).

In 1910, Mortensen also purchased Strandgade 30.

=== Later history ===
Edvard Pedersen's shop with work clothing was from 1938 located in the basement. It had until then been located at Brogade 27.

In the 1930s, Strandgade 28–30 was acquired by Henry L. W. Jensen, a retailer of oriental carpets. In the 1940s, he restored the complex.

== Architecture ==
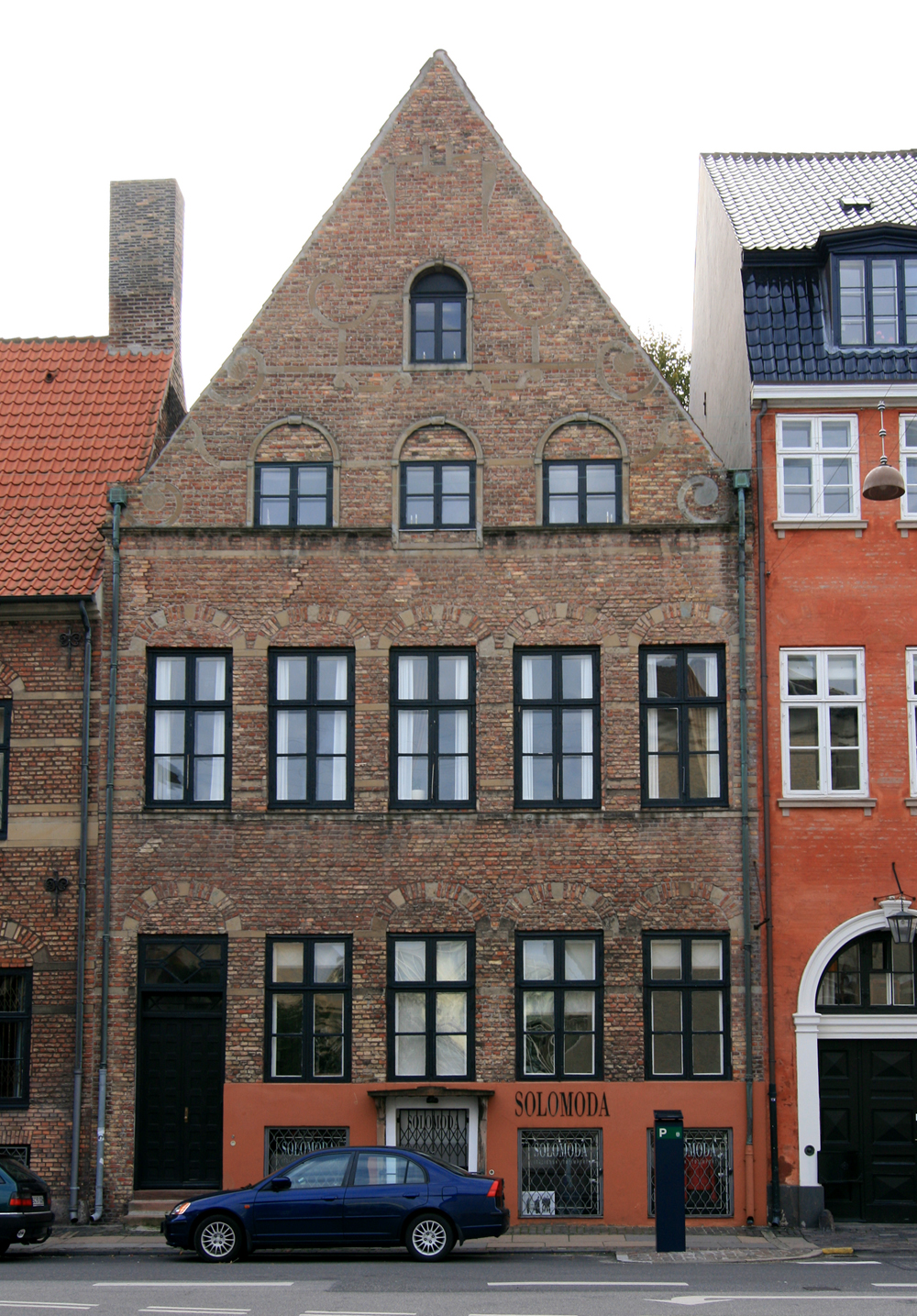
Strandgade 28

Strandgade 28 is a gable-fronted townhouse constructed with two storeys over a walk-out basement. The five-bays-wide facade is constructed in red brick. It was originally crowned by a Dutch gable but it was changed to its current appearance in connection with a renovation in 1817–18. The main entrance was at the same time moved from the second bay from the left to the one furthest to the left. The door is topped by a transom window. The gable used to feature a pulley beam but it has been removed. The basement entrance in the central bay is topped by a hood mould. The plastered facade was changed to undressed brick in connection with a renovation following a bombing in 1943 (during World War II). The rear side of the building is plastered and painted white. One of the rooms on the first floor features decorations possibly created by the painter Nicolai Abildgaard.

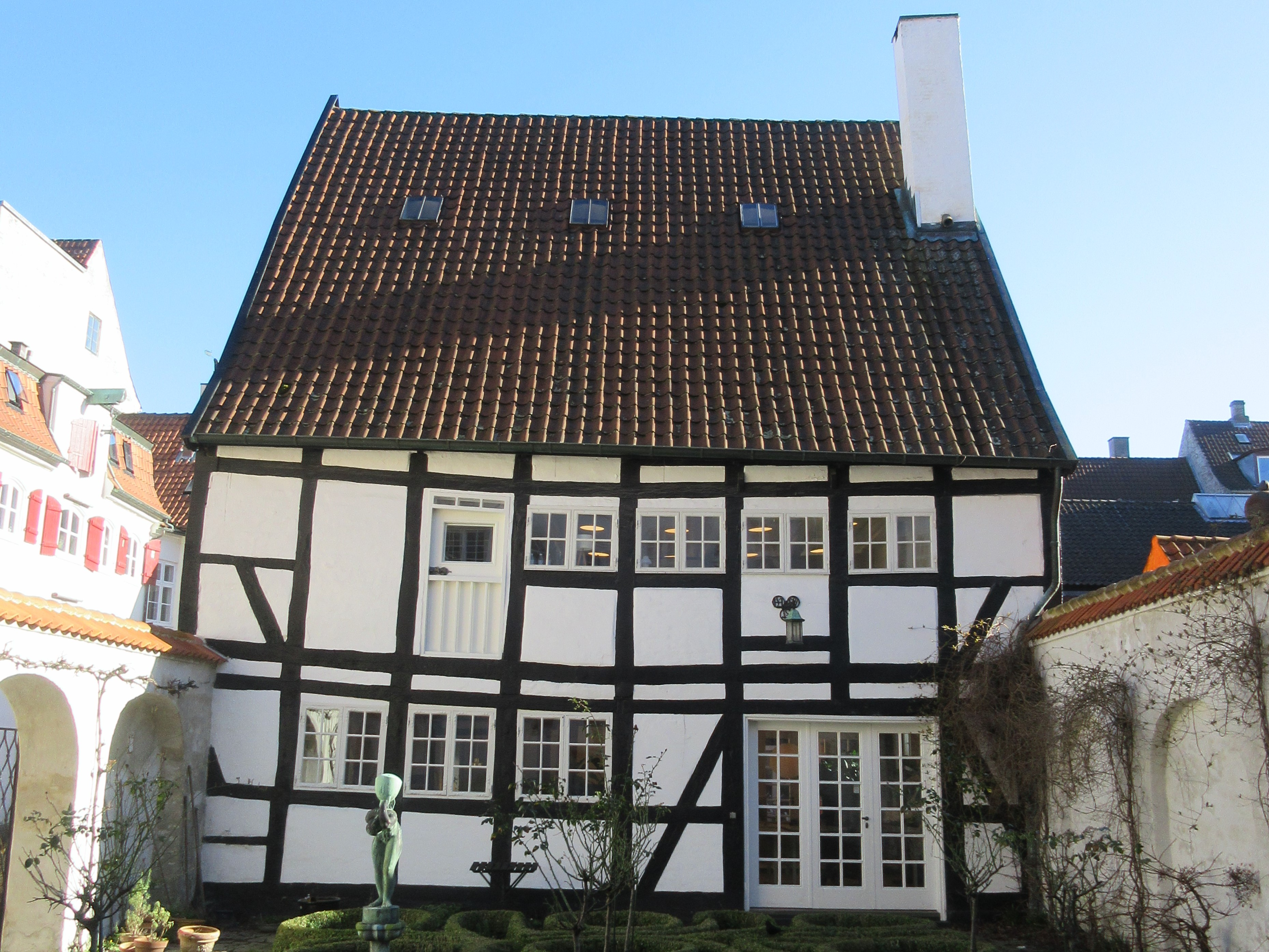
The rear wing, seen from the courtyard towards Strandgade

The former warehouse at Wildersgade 41 is eight bays wide and two storeys tall. It is constructed with black-painted timber framing and undressed yellow brick infills towards the street. The facade is crowned by a two-bay, gabled wall dormer with an intact pulley beam. The building is via a two-storey side wing along the boundary with Wildersgade 43 attached to the half-timbered rear wing. The side wing is constructed in brick.

The eight-bays-wide rear wing separates the two courtyards from each other. It is constructed with brown-painted timber framing and plastered, white-painted infills. The steep red tile roof is pierced by a tall chimney on the side that faces Strandgade.

The courtyard closest to Strandgade is separated from the courtyard of Strandgade 30 by a brick wall with an opening. It features a Baroque-style, parterre-like garden complex with a sculpture.

== Today ==
The property is owned by Henry L. W. Jensens Gårds Ejerf. Matr. Strandgade 28 contains one apartment on each floor.

== Gallery ==
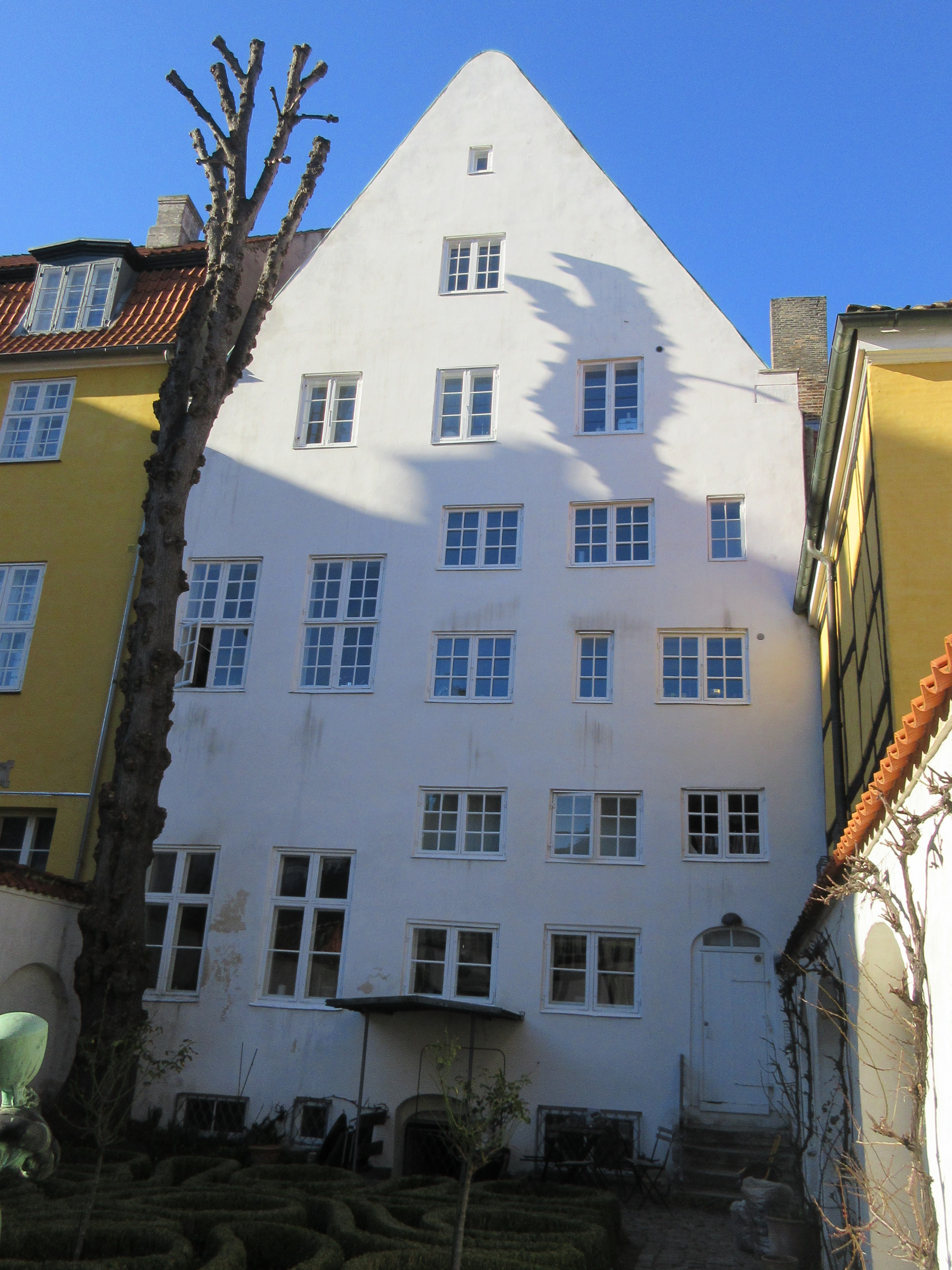
Strandgade 28 viewed from the yard

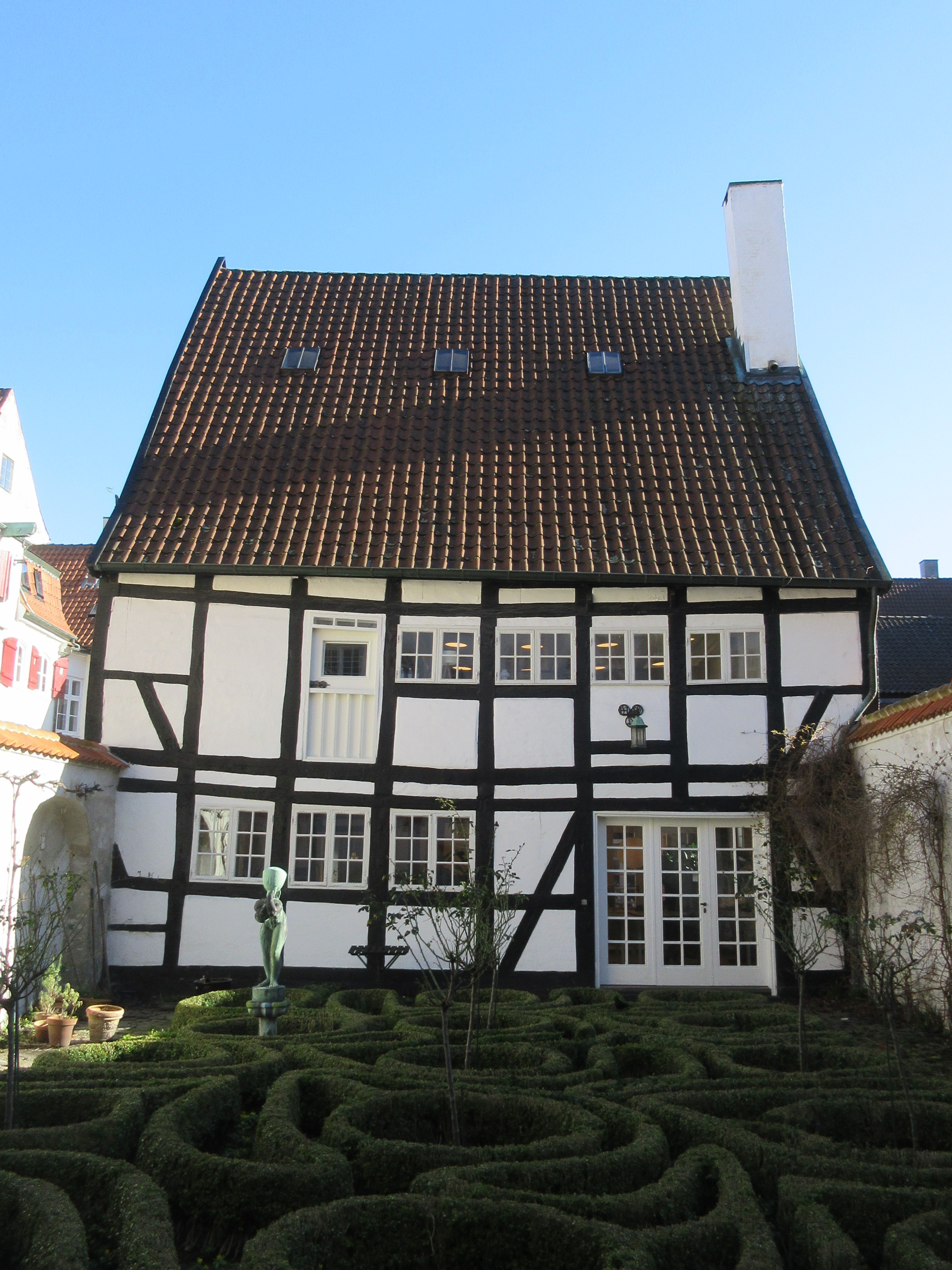
The rear wing

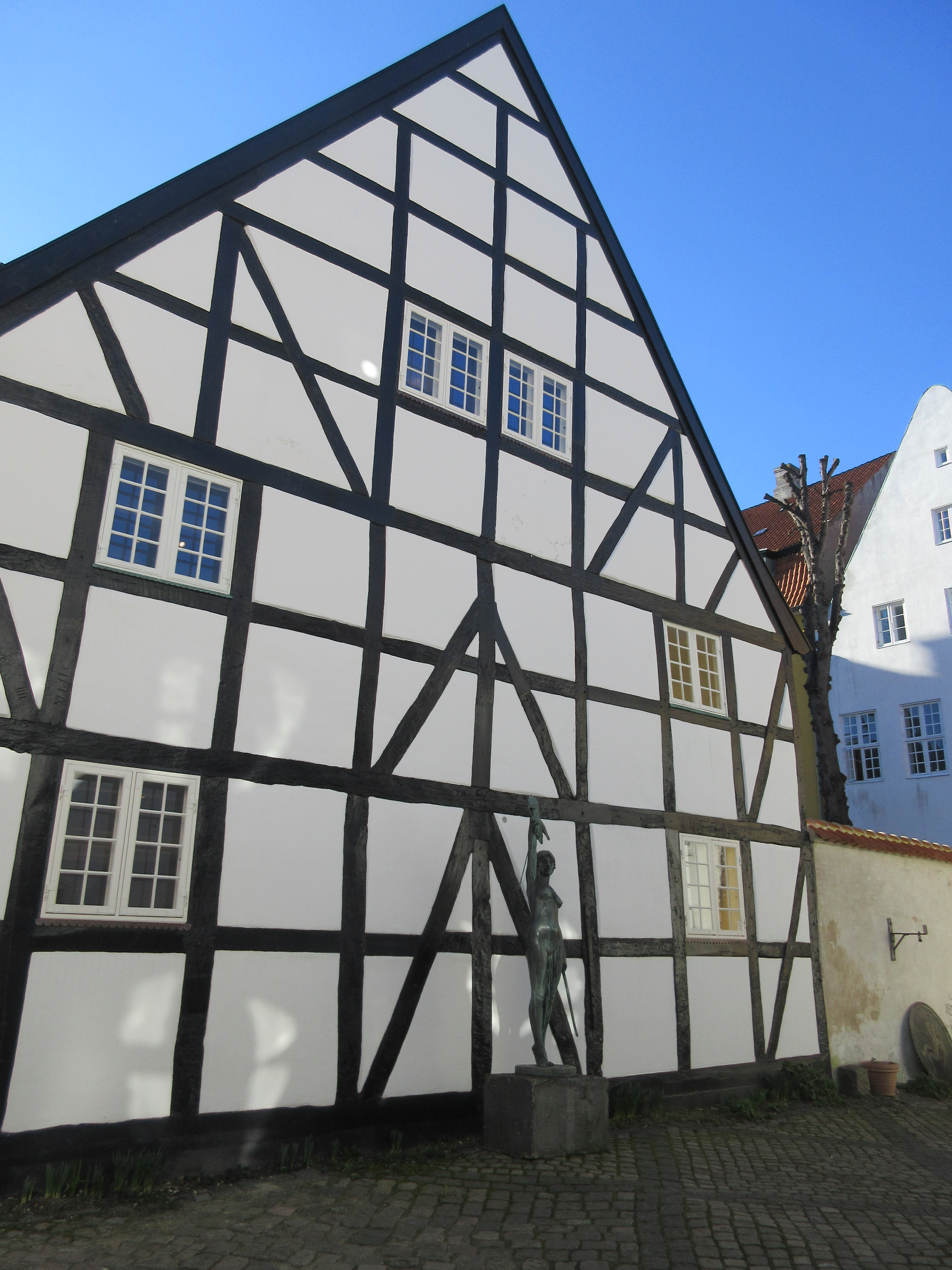
The gable of the rear wing viewed from the yard of Strandgade 30

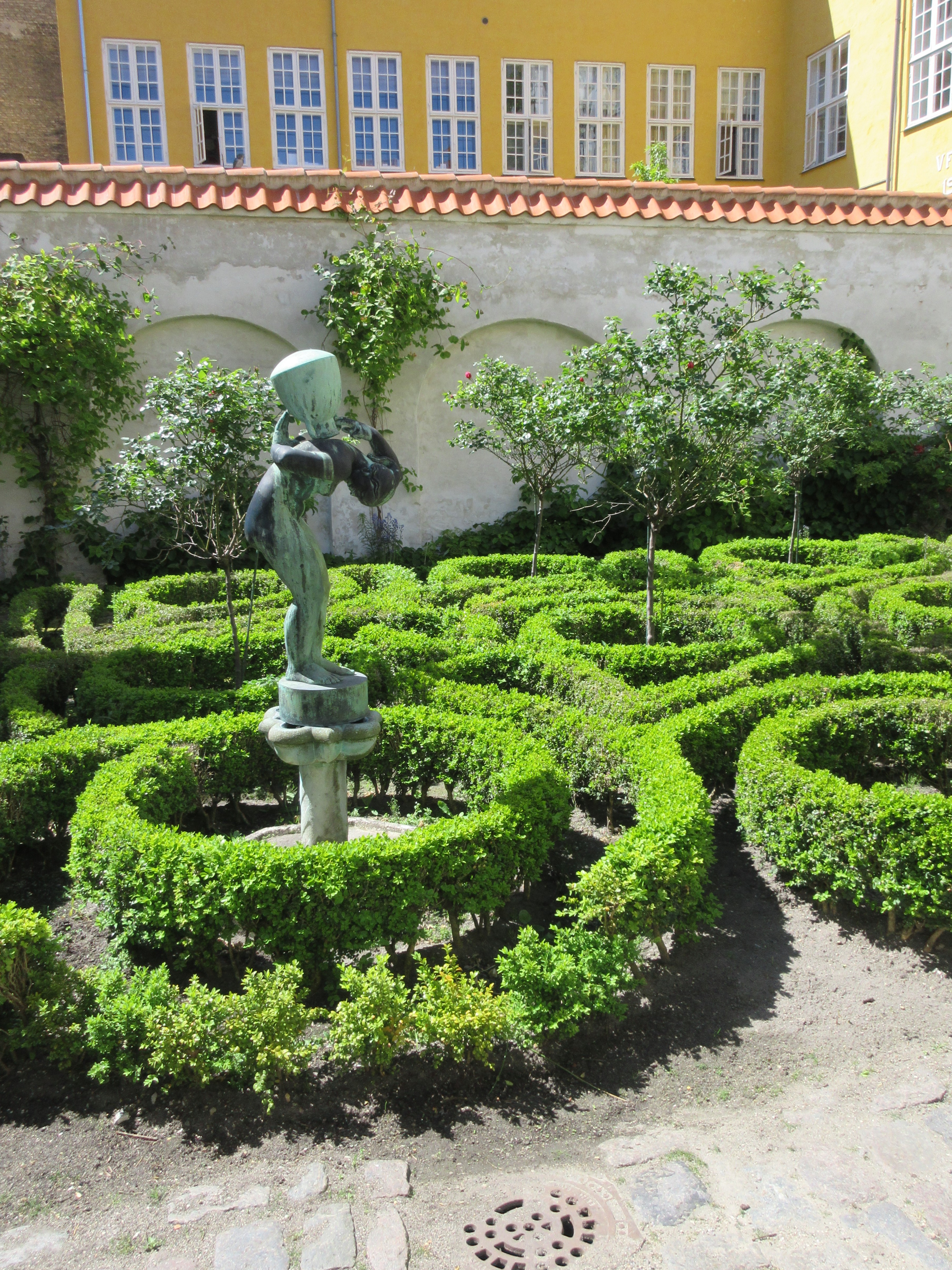
The Baroque garden

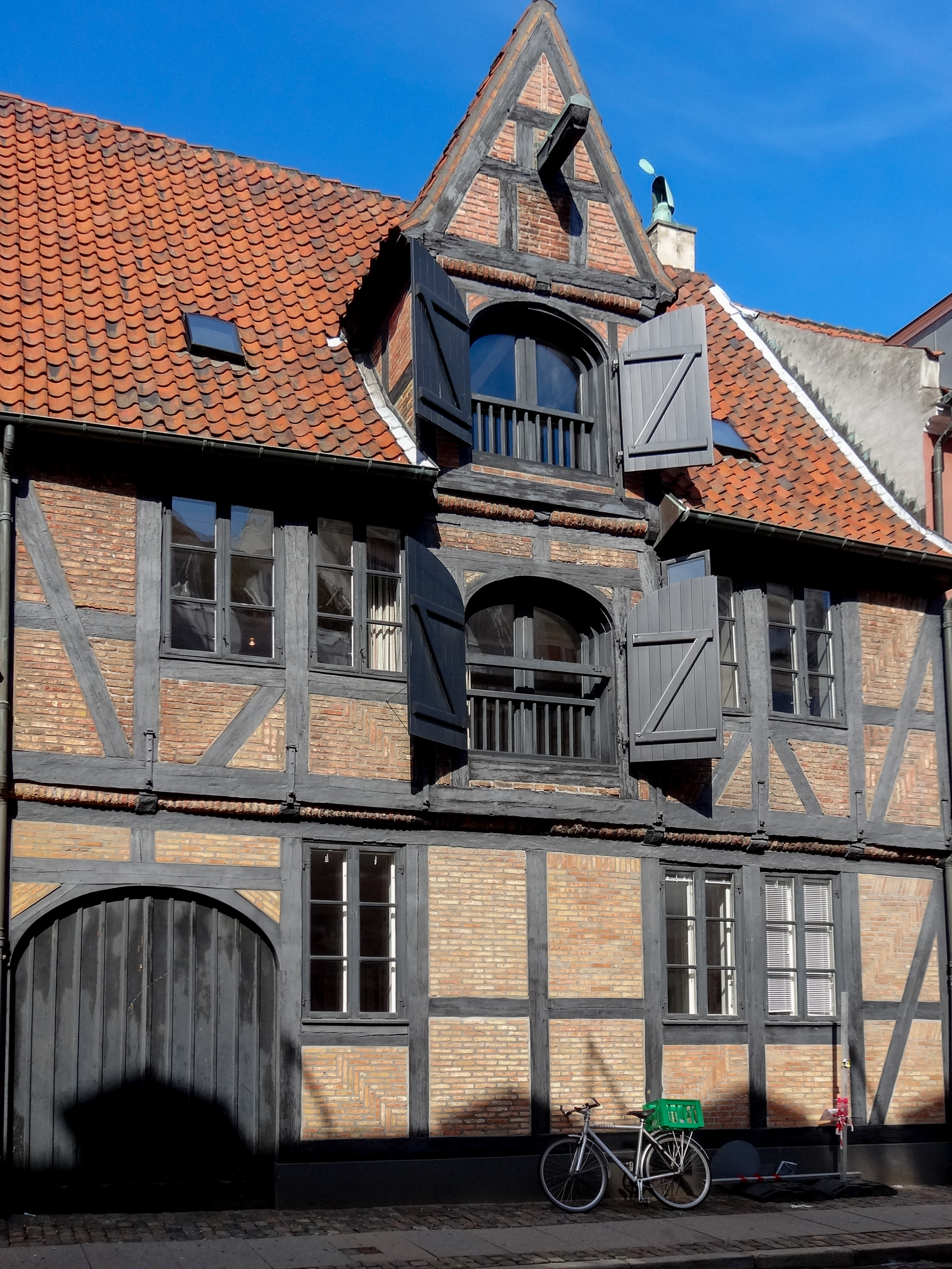
Wildersgade 41
