= Rohde House =

Building in Copenhagen, Denmark

- Den Rohdeske Gård
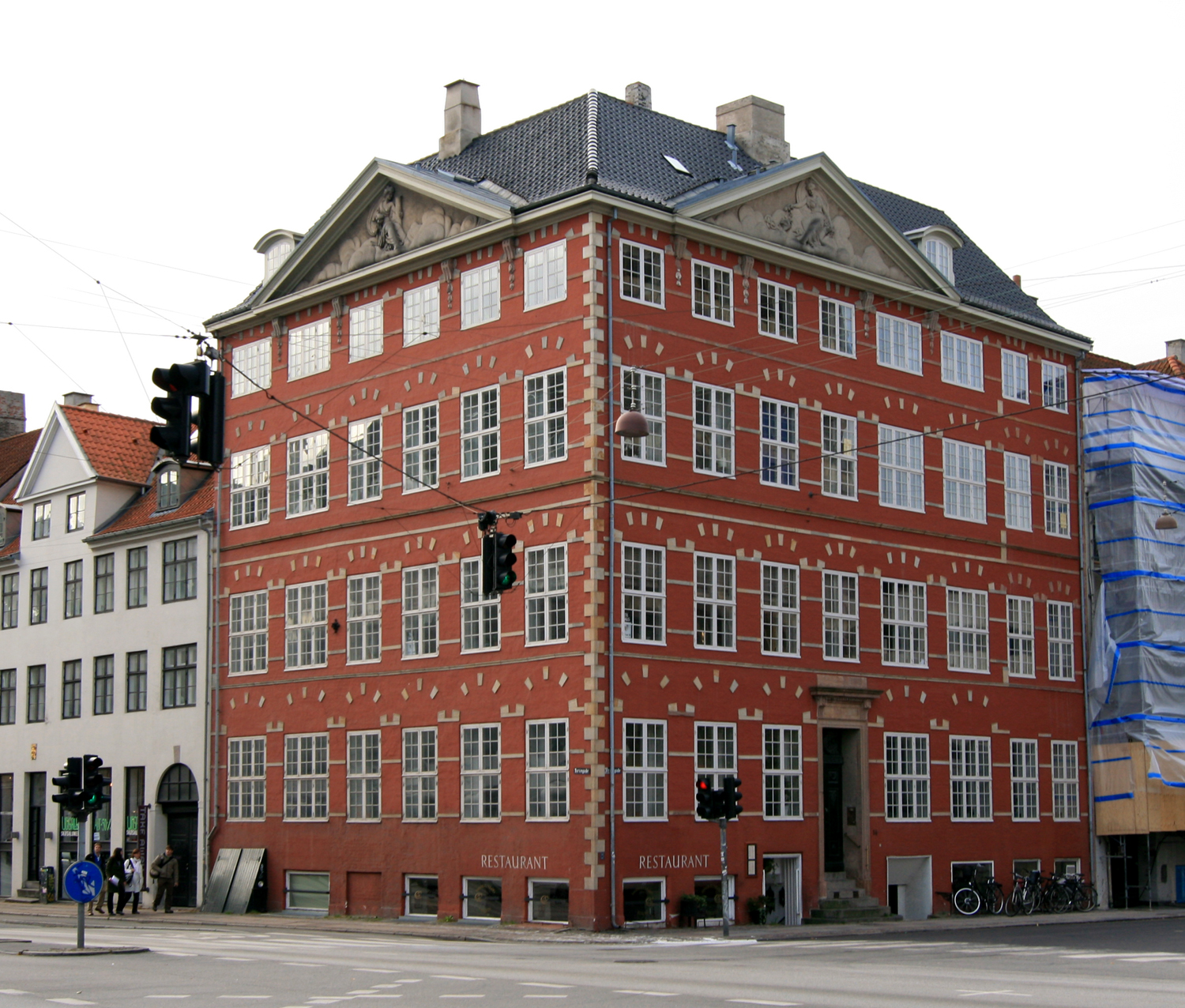
- The Rohde House
- Interactive map of the Rohde House area

General information
- Location: Copenhagen, Denmark
- Coordinates: 55°40′24.16″N 12°35′20.46″E
- Construction started: 1640
- Completed: 1794

The Rohde House (Danish: Den Rohdeske Gård) is a historic property located at the corner of Strandgade (No. 14) and Torvegade in the Christianshavn neighbourhood of central Copenhagen, Denmark.

== History ==
=== Early history ===
The property was part of a large lot at present-day No. 8–14. No. 14 was sold off to statholder Frantz Rantzow in 1630. In 1632, he was appointed as Steward of the Realm, but died later that same year. It is believed that the house was built in about 1640 for Nahman Hiort, one of the first councilmen of the new market town which had been incorporated on 8 June 1639. Hiort owned both No. 14 and No. 12 from 1642 to 1653. The next owner was baker Jens Sørensen, whose widow owned the property until 1668. The property was listed as No. 15 in Christianshavn Quarter in Copenhagen's first cadastre of 1689. It was at that time owned by brewer Anders Svendsen.

=== Rohde family ===
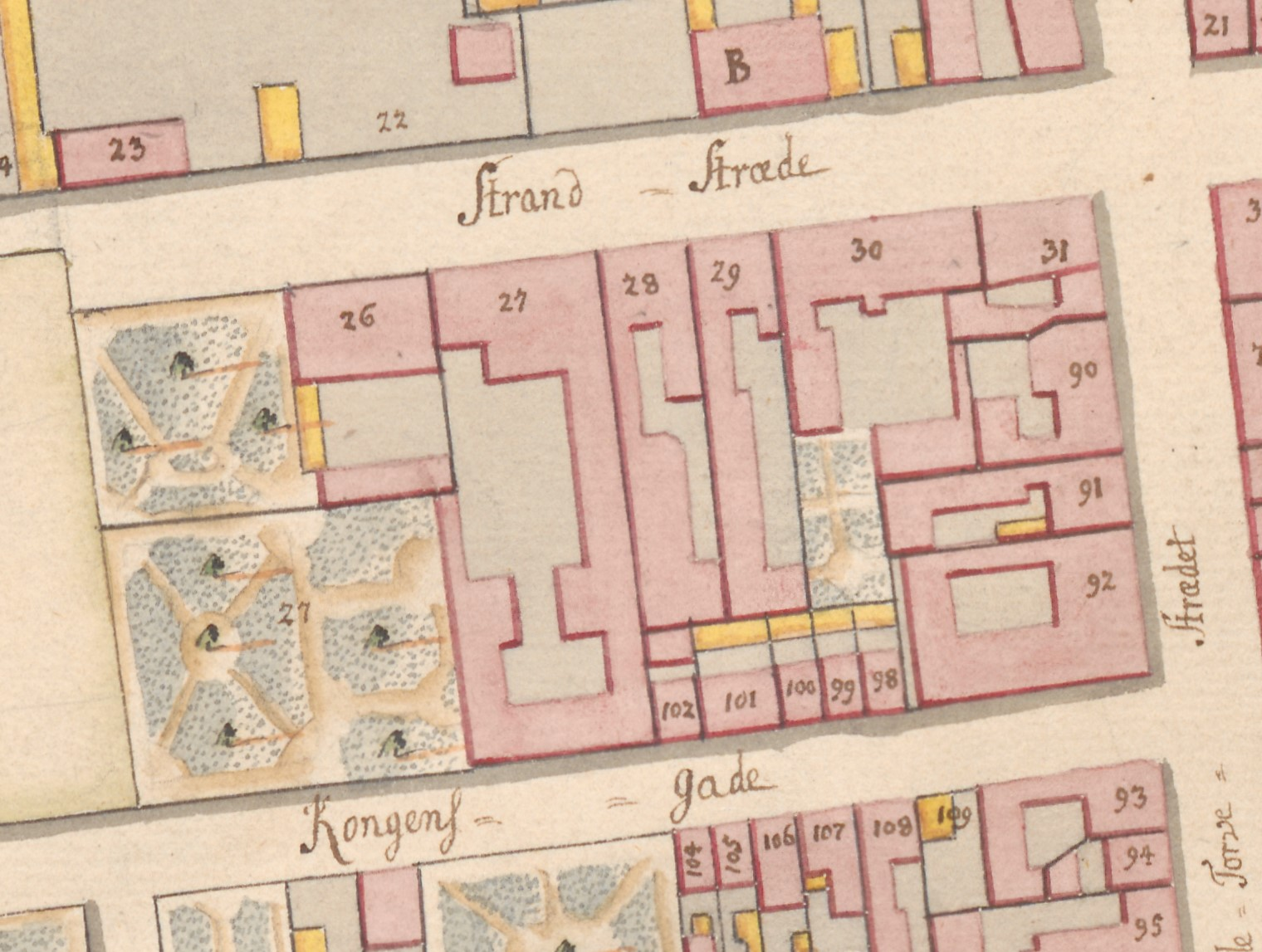
No. 31 seen in a detail from Christian Gedde's map of Christianshavn Quarter, 1757

Strandgade 12 was sold off in 1702. It was listed as No. 31 in the new cadastre of 1756. It was at that time owned by wine merchant (vintapper) Rasmus Rohde. In 1781, it was passed to his son Mathias Rohde. He expanded the house with two extra floors in 1785 (some sources say 1794) and operated a tavern in the cellar.

The property was home to 18 residents in two households at the 1787 census. Mathias Rohde resided in the building with his wife Maria Catarina Kalder, their two daughters (aged eight and 11), a clerk, two wine merchant's apprentices, two maids and two caretakers. Giertrud Rode, Rohde's mother, resided in the building with her daughter Sissilia Margrete Rosted and nine-year-old granddaughter Giertrud Rosted, 12-year-old Mathilde Catarine Amorspil, 30-year-old Annette Dømene and two maids.

=== Jarsberg family ===
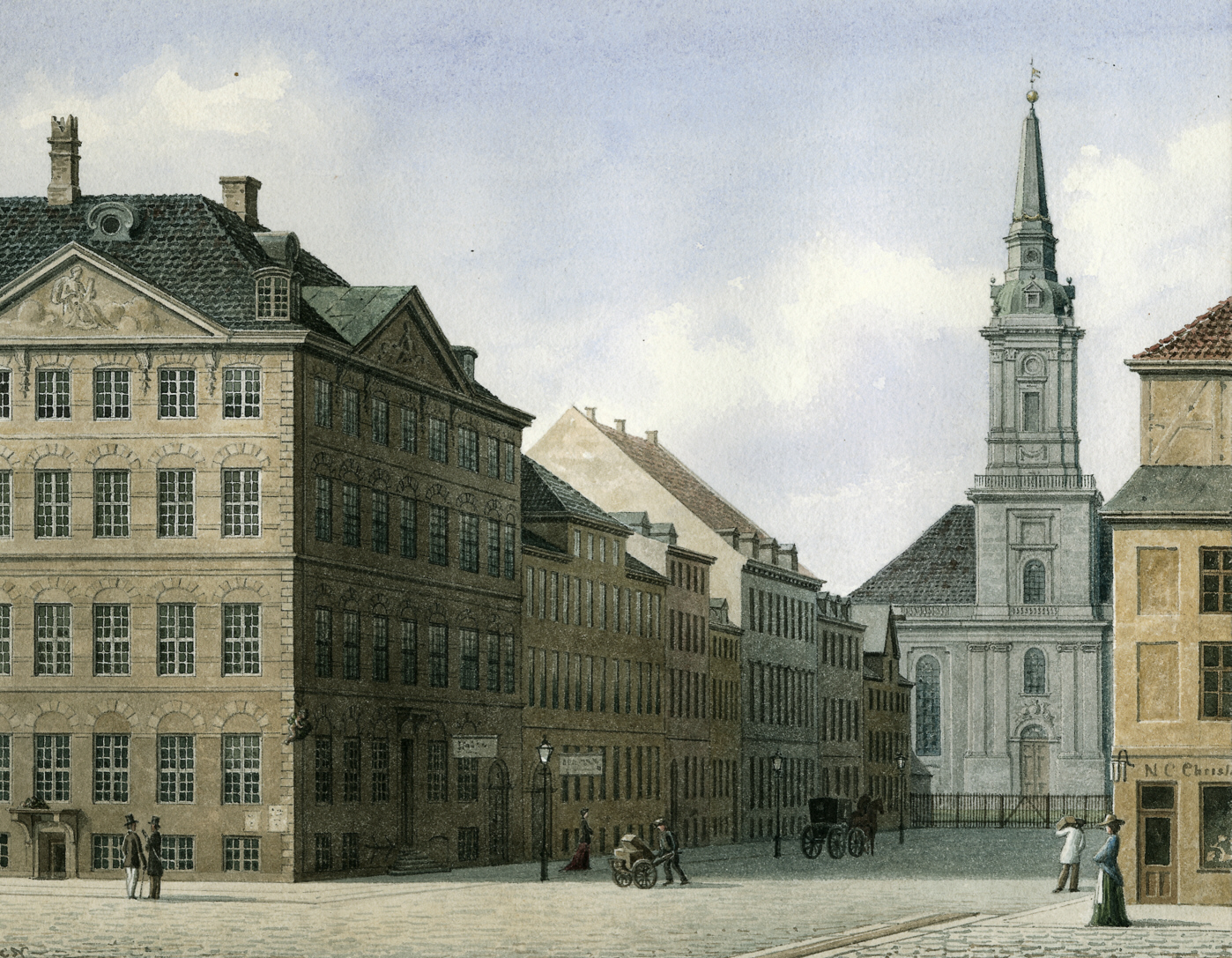
The Rohde House in the 19th century

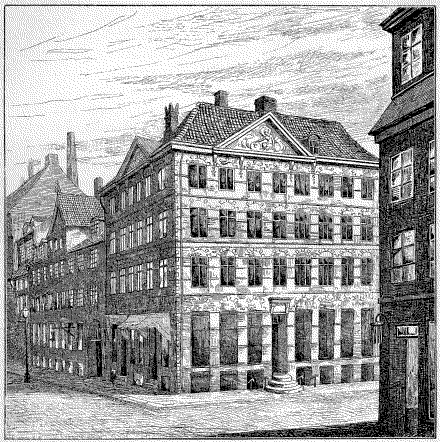
The Rohde House in the 19th century

On 11 February 1798, Jacob Kaarsberg (1752–1819) established a wine trading company in the building. The company was operated under the name Vinhuset in 1898.

At the time of the 1801 census, No. 31 was home to 37 residents in four households. Hans Sørensen, a 35-year-old unmarried wine merchant, resided in the building with two wine merchant's apprentices, a male servant, a maid, a clerk and a merchant. Ole Hielte (1753–1716), a bookkeeper in the Danish Asiatic Company, resided in the building with his wife Knudine Cathrine Hielte, their 12 children (aged one to 17), a wet nurse and three maids. Friderich Julius Christian Saint Aubain, an artillery captain, resided in the building with his wife Ane Bolette Saint Aubain, their two sons (aged one and three), a wet nurse, a maid and the grocer (urtekræmmer) Peter Hansen. The younger son, Andreas Nicolai de Saint-Aubain, who had been born in the building on 18 November 1798, later became a writer, publishing under the pseudonym Carl Bernhard. He was a cousin of Johan Ludvig Heiberg.

In the new cadastre of 1806, Karsberg's property was listed as No. 51 in Christianshavn Quarter. The company existed well into the 20th century, but had by then relocated to Amagerbrogade 15. It was later continued by his son P. A. Kaarsberg (1791–1866) and then by Wilh. Schreiber (died 1876)

The property was home to 31 residents in five households at the 1840 census. Peter Andreasen Kaarsberg resided on the ground floor with his wife Julie Maria født Thorup, his son Jacob Peter Kaarsberg, an apprentice, a male servant and a maid. Carl Andreas Løwert, another wine merchant, resided on the ground floor with his wife Caroline Frederiche and their three children (aged seven to 12). Anna Sophie Mariane Bruun, manager of Christianshavn Daughters' School, resided on the first floor with one maid. Broder Knud Wigelsen, a captain in the Royal Danish Navy, resided on the second floor with his wife Karen Magdalene Fangen, their seven children (aged eight to 18) and one maid. Bentine Maria Adolph født Kinck, a widow greengrocer, resided on the third floor with her 27-year-old stepson Johan David Staffelt Adolph, her Maria Camilla Fanøe, two maids and two male servants.

Friderich Ludevig Flycke, a bookkeeper, resided in the building with his wife Johanne Marie Flycke, their two daughters (aged five and nine) and one maid.

Pastor Nicolai G. Blædel, a co-founder of Indre Mission in Copenhagen, lived in the building from 1845 to 1846. The naval officer Edouard Suenson lived in the building in the beginning of the 1850s.

The Kaarsberg family owned the building until 1877. The property was home to seven households at the 1860 census. Peter Andersen Kaarsberg resided on the third floor with his wife Juliane Marie Thorup, his wife's niece Eleonora Jensen and two lodgers. Haagen Thulin, a restaurateur, resided on the ground floor with his wife Klara f. Petersen. their two stepdaughters, two employees and a maid. Frederik Wilhelm Barth, a carpenter, resided in the other ground-floor apartment with his wife and two unmarried children (aged 31 and 33). Chris. Theodor Smauck Lange, a businessman (grosserer), resided in one of the first-floor apartments with his wife Maria (née Thye), their infant daughter and one maid. Joh. Pet. Waywadt, a district physician, resided in the other first-floor apartment with his wife Louise (née Schaltz), their five children (aged seven to 17) and two maids. Christian Roselvig, a landscape painter, resided in one of the second-floor apartments with the widow Christine Albertus and her two children (aged 12 and 15). Johanne Wendholtz, a schoolmistress (institutbestyrerinde), resided in the other second-floor apartment.

=== 1880 census ===
At the 1880 census, Standgade 14 was home to a total of 84 residents. Frants Peter Nielsen, a barkeeper, resided on the ground floor and first floor of the building with his wife Ellen Marie Nielsen (née Sørensen), their two children (aged eight to 12) and one maid.

Carl Martin Linzmeier Engholm, a ship's chandler (skibsekviperingshandler), resided on the first floor with his wife Petrine Nicoline Engholm (née Jespersen), their three children (aged six to ten) and one maid.

Peter Rasmus Linde, a pensioner, resided on the second floor with his wife Christine Linde (née Leidersdorf) and the former coachman Johannes Nielsen. The painter Hans Jørgen Hammer and the sculptor Otto Evens lived together in the other second-floor apartment. Frederik Christian Larsen, a master saddler, resided on the third floor with his wife Petrea Larsen, two apprentices (aged 14 and 17) and a lodger (aged 64). August Steffens, a master plumber, resided on the third floor and in the basement towards Strandgade. He lived there with his wife Vilhelmine Rosaline Nathalie Steffens (née Flechtner), their five children (aged 11 to 19) and one maid. Niels Laursen, proprietor of a coffee shop, resided in the other half of the basement (towards Torvegade) with his wife Thora Sophie Laursen (née Lindorff), his mother-in-law Anna Lindorff (née Andersen), a nine-year-old foster daughter and two maids. Hans Peter Rasmussen, a saddler, resided in the garret with his wife Anna Rasmussen (née Alexandersen), their two children (aged zero and two) and two maids.

== Architecture ==
The building consists of four floors and a cellar. Eight bays front Strandgade while six bays front Torvegade. The two uppermost floors and two of the bays along Strandgade date from the 1794 expansion. The facade is red-washed with sandstone details. The portal is decorated with bunches of grapes.
