= Strandgade =

Street in Copenhagen, Denmark

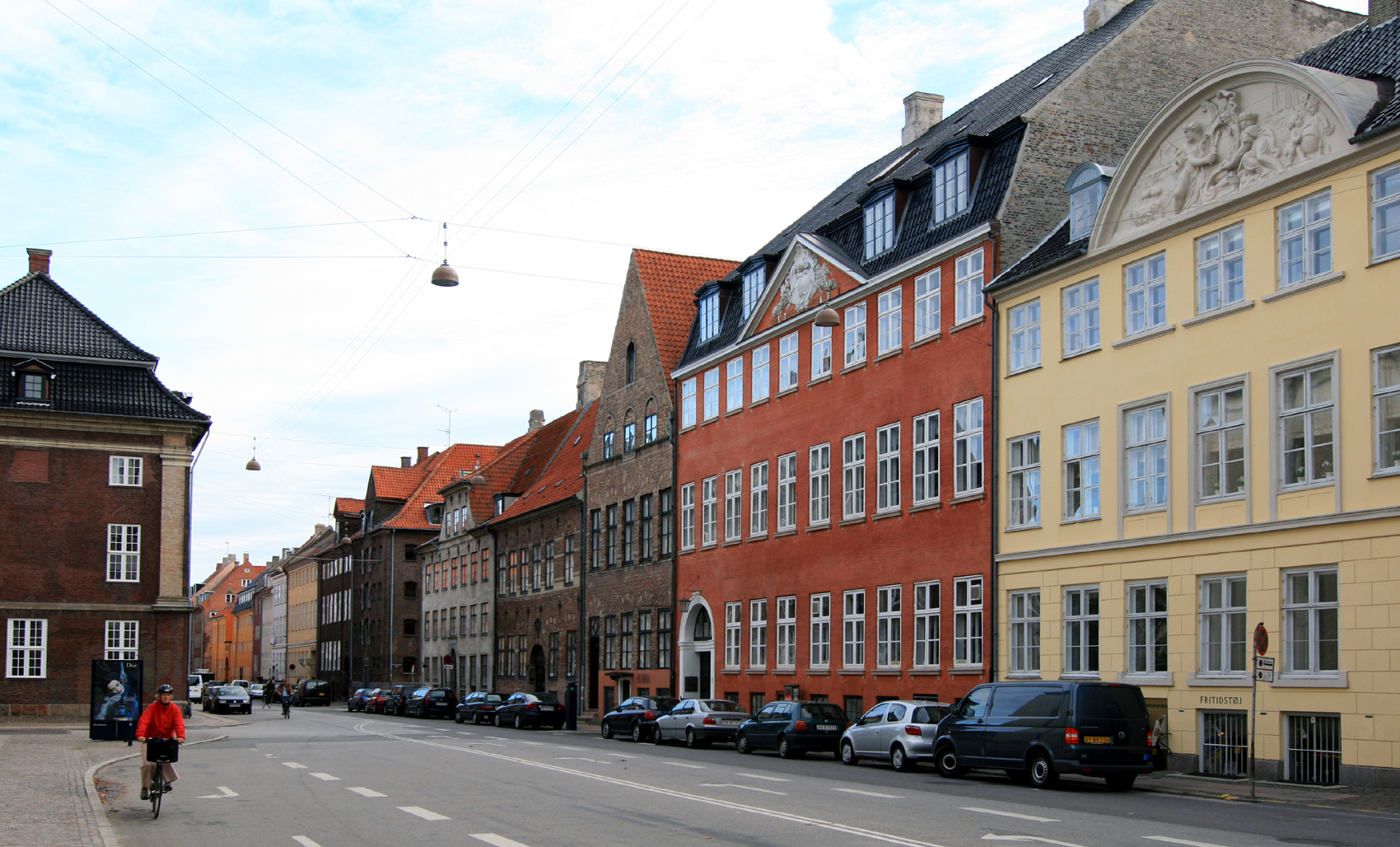
- Strandgade seen from Torvegade
- Length: 494 m (1,621 ft)
- Location: Christianshavn, Copenhagen, Denmark
- Postal code: 1416
- Coordinates: 55°40′28.92″N 12°35′26.88″E

Strandgade (lit. 'Strand Street') is one of the principal streets in the Christianshavn district of Copenhagen, Denmark. It runs along the full length of the neighbourhood, following the waterfront of the Inner Harbour, from Christian's Church in the south-west to Grønlandske Handels Plads in the north.

The northern part of the street is a cul-de-sac for motor vehicles while a bridge for pedestrians and cyclists across Trangraven is currently under construction.

== History ==
=== Origins ===
Strandgade is one of the streets seen in Johan Semp's plan for Christianshavn from 1617. The original intention was only to build along the south-east side of the street, away from the water, while the beach provided private harbour facilities for the lot owners, who could easily transfer goods from ships to their warehouses and storage cellars. This solution was repeated along both sides of Christianshavn Canal. The lots along the street did not sell well and in the end the king gave them away to wealthy citizens from Copenhagen on condition that they built "good commerce houses" on them.

=== Development along the west side ===
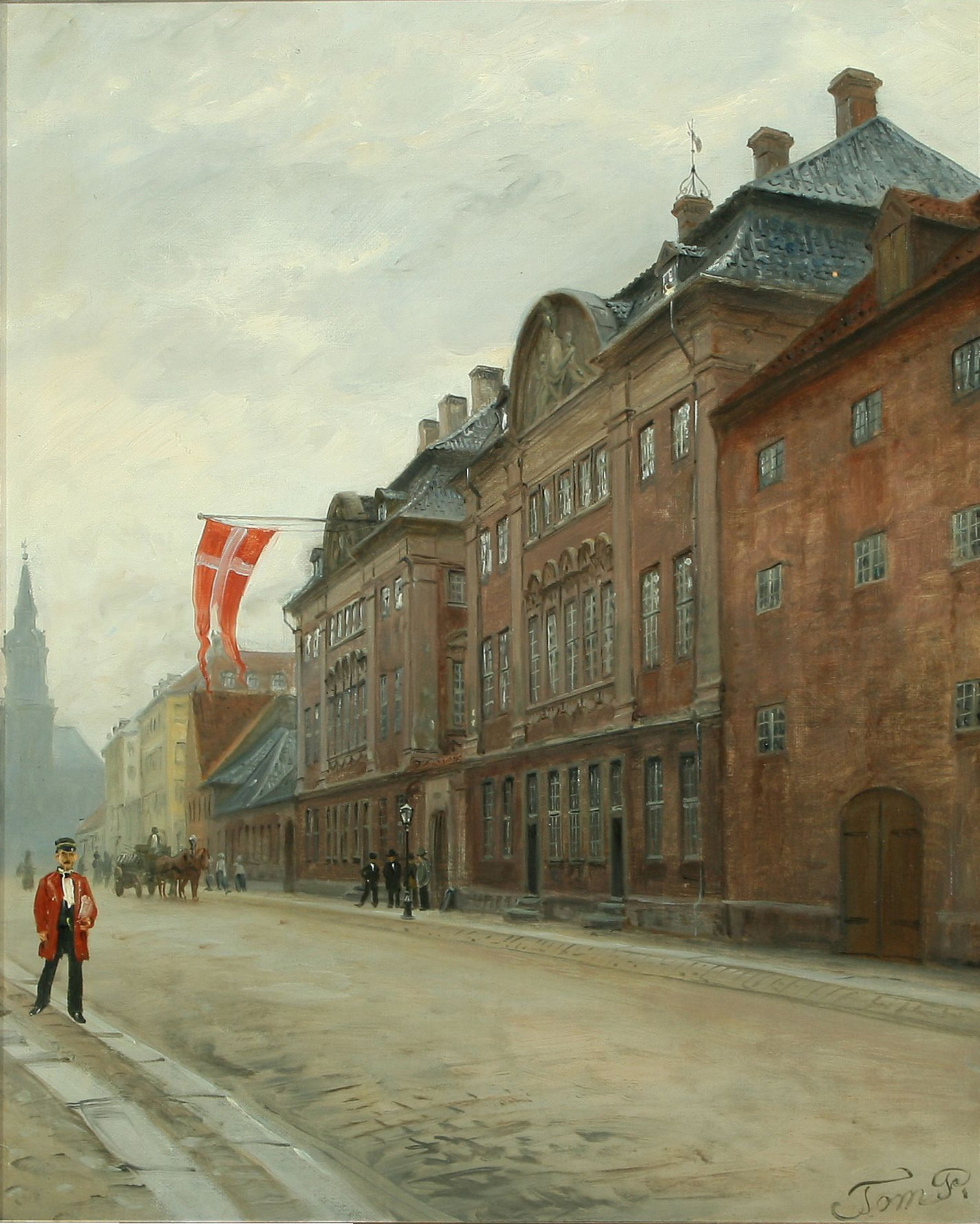
Danish Asia Company seen from Strandgade

Danish East India Company and Danish West India Company established their headquarters north and south of Torvegade/Knippels Bridge respectively. In 1730, the site on the north side of Torvegade was taken over by Danish Asia Company, a reconstruction of Danish East India Company. They completed a new head office on the site in 1738. Denmark's first dry dock, later known as Old Dock, opened just north of there in 1739.

=== Extension of the street ===
Originally Strandstræde only reached as far north as Bådsmandsstræde. The area north of Wilder's Bridge was not reclaimed until Andreas Bjørn established a shipyard there in 1735. Strandgade was later extended through the area after it had been divided into Wilders Plads, Krøyers Plads and Grønlandske Handels Plads.

== Architecture ==
The east side of the oldest section of the street is still completely dominated by the historic townhouses, although many have been altered, extended or replaced over the years. Dating from the 1620s, the house row at No. 28-32 has some of the oldest houses in Christianshavn. The Mikkel Vibe House at No. 32 was built by Mikkel Vibe who was mayor of Copenhagen. Other notable houses along this stretch of the street are the Lehn House at No. 6, Rhode House at No. 14, Behagen House at No. 26, Sigvert Grubbe House at No. 28-30 and Andreas Bjørn House at No. 46.

== Today ==
The most notable visitor attractions in the street are Danish Architecture Centre, North Atlantic House and Christian's Church.

Other institutions in the street include the Ministry of Foreign Affairs, the Environmental Agency and Architects' Association of Denmark. Nordea's Danish headquarters occupy the entire waterfront south of Torvegade.
