= Tutein House =

Neoclassical building in Copenhagen

- Ruteins Gård
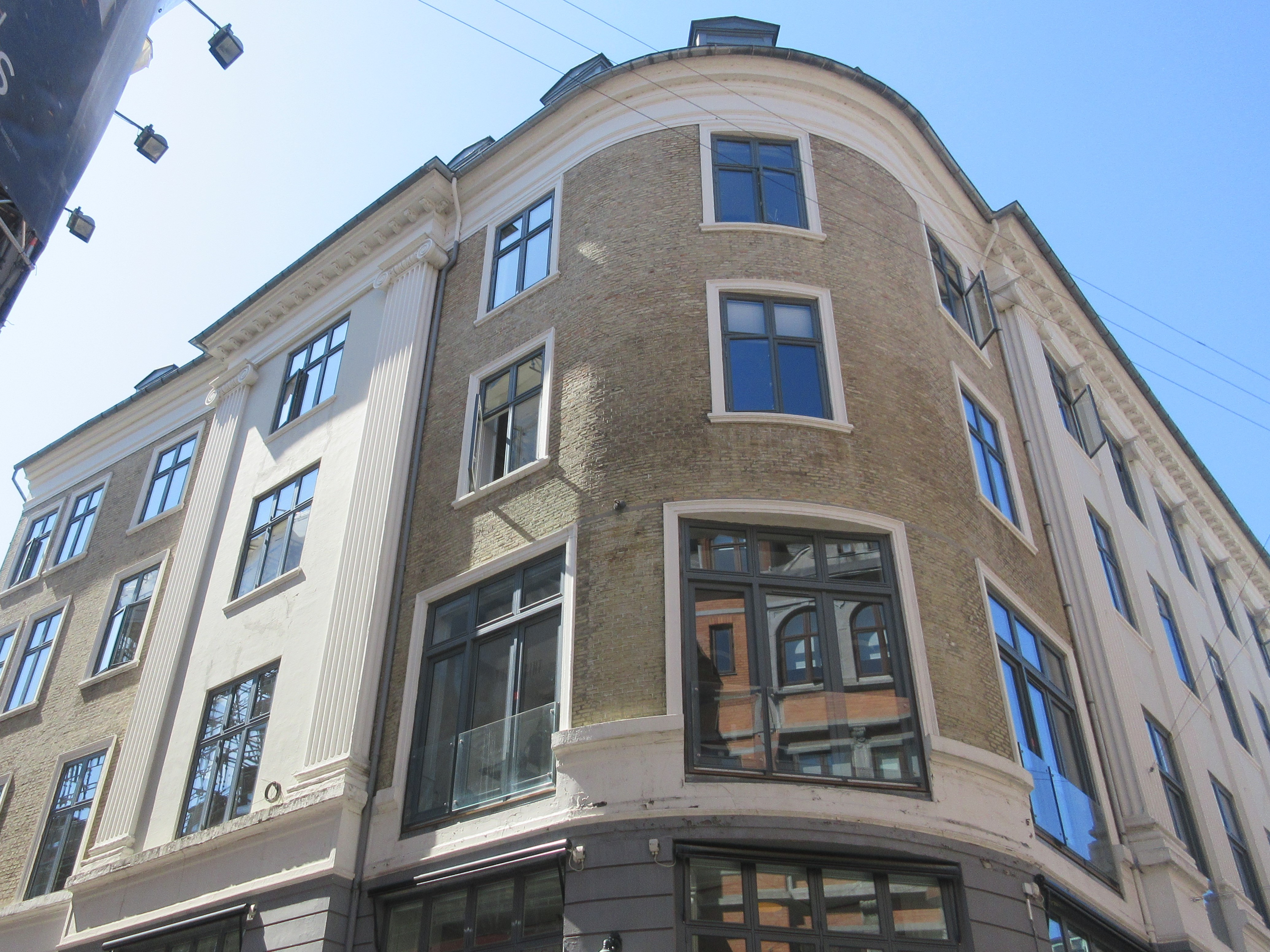

General information
- Location: Copenhagen, Denmark
- Coordinates: 55°40′43″N 12°34′28.5″E
- Completed: 1801

The Tutein House (Danish: Tuteins Gård) is a Neoclassical former bourgeois townhouse situated at the corner of Vimmelskaftet and Badstuestræde, on the pedestrianized shopping street Strøget, in central Copenhagen, Denmark. The building was constructed by Johan Martin Quist for Friederich Tutein in 1800–01. The building was adapted and extended in 1881 by Reinholdt W. Jorck, for whom Jorcks Passage on the other side of the street would later also be constructed. Café Bernina—Copenhagen's leading literary coffee house in the late 19th century—opened in the building in October 1881. Kjøbenhavns Telefon-Selskab's first central office was also based in the building from 1881 to 1895. The building is still owned by Jorcks Ejendomme, a property company established by Reinholdt W. Jorck's son Georg Jorck and now owned by two charitable foundations created by him. The tenants include the newspaper Kristeligt Dagblad.

== History ==
=== Site history, 1756–17945 ===
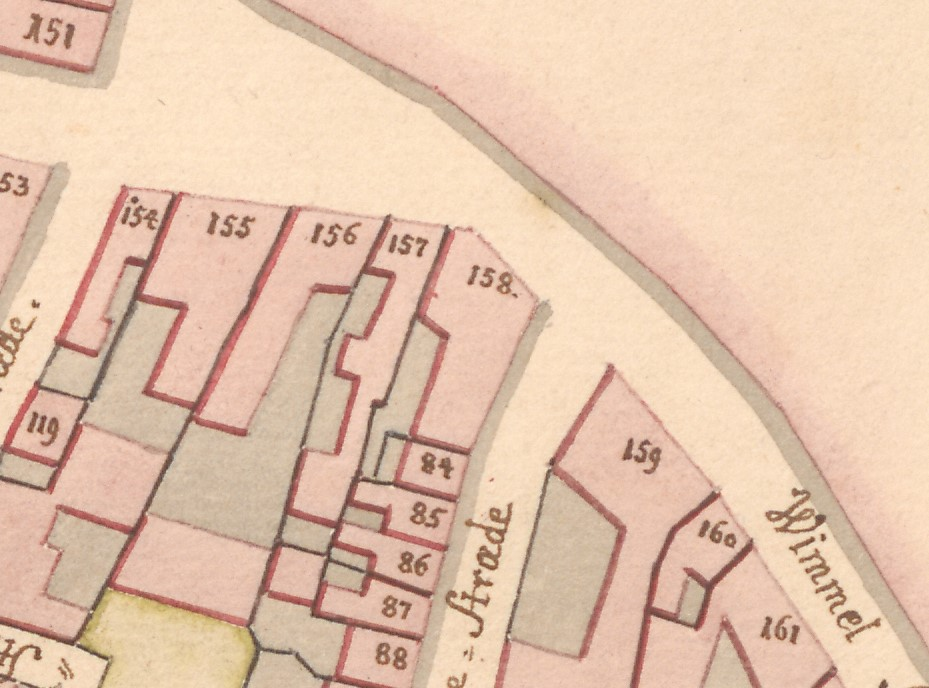
No. 156–18 and No. 84 seen in a detail from Christian Gedde's map of Snaren's Quarter, 1757

The property now known as Vimmelskaftet 47 & Badstuestræde 2 was created through the merger of four smaller properties. The corner property was listed in Copenhagen's new cadastre of 1756 as No. 158 in Snaren's Quarter, owned by grocer (urtekræmmer) Knud jacob Brüner. The adjacent property in Vimmelskaftet was listed as No. 157 in Snaren's Quarter, owned by grocer (urtekræmmer) Peder Mathiesen. The adjacent property in Badstuestræde was listed as No. 84, owned by shoemaker Johan Christian Rüdiger. The fourth property, situated in Vimmelskaftet, adjacent to No. 157, was listed as No. 156 in Snaren's Quarter, owned by merchant (købmand) Claus Plum.

No. 158 was home to 41 residents in four households at the 1787 census. Andreas Wulff, a needle maker, resided in the building with his wife Mette Stierne, seven children from his first marriage (aged eight to 20), two employees, three male servants (musqueteers) and one maid. Hinrich Johannes Krebs, a professor of mathematics, resided in the building with his wife Christina Sophia von Bracht, their five children (aged three to 14), one male servant, one female cook, two maids and the lodger Carl Friderich Hemsen (son of former governor of the Danish Gold Coast Johan Conrad von Hemsen). Detleff Mauritzen, a cook in the king's kitchen, resided in the building with his wife Ellen Larsen, their five children (aged one to 11) and one maid. Lars Christensen, a grocer (høker), resided in the basement with his wife Maria Christine, their three children (aged one to six) and one maid.

No. 157 was home to 15 residents in two households at the 1787 census. Niels Ahrensberg, a collector at Tal-Lotteriet, resided in the building with his wife Cathrine Lise Nickelman, their five children (aged two to 16), a female cook and a maid. Ludevig Wittrog, a supercargo in the service of the Danish Asiatic Company, resided in the building with his wife Henriette Magdalena Rossow, their three children (aged 11 to 21) and one maid. No. 156 belonged to wine merchant Jacob Drewsen at the 1787 census. He resided in the building with his wife Magdalena Friderica Zumpe, their son Martin Drewsen, the wife's sister Elisabet Margretha Zumpe, his nephew Jørgen Christopher Drewsen (assessor at the Supreme Court), an employee in his wine business, three apprentices, a coachman, a caretaker, one male servant, two maids and a female cook. No. 84 belonged to fourier Johan Heinrich Cramer. He resided in the building with his wife Margrete Catrine Lars Datter.

=== Tutein family ===
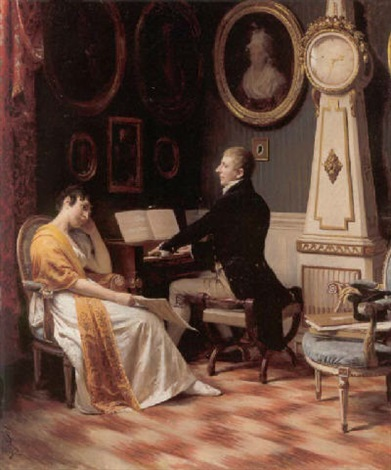
Carl Thomsen: Weyse in the Tutein home

The buildings were all destroyed in the Copenhagen Fire of 1795, together with most of the other buildings in the area. The present building on the site was constructed by Johan Martin Quist for Friederich Tutein in 1800–01. Tutein had just taken over his father Peter Pierre Tutein's business empire. It comprised one of the largest trading houses in the city, a calico factory at Sortedam Lake and interests in a sugar refinery.

In 1802, Tutein also purchased the country house Rosendal (Rosenvenge) in Østerbro. In 1809. he also purchased the manor house Edelgave north of Copenhagen.

Tutein's property at the corner of Vimmelskaftet and Badstuestræde was listed in the new cadastre of 1806 as No. 135 in Snaren's Quarter. The associated warehouse caught fire during the British bombardment in 1807, resulting in the loss of 130,000 pounds of cotton textiles.

In around 1810 the house was also the home of Tutein's wealthy son-in-law, Johann Jacob Frölich, who until then had lived at Lille Strandstræde 20. He was a prominent member of the German Reformed Church.

The Tutein family kept a large household and a busy social life. They were fond of music and the composer C. E. F. Weyse often visited their home. Tutein was appointed to Prussian consul general in 1808 but gave up the office at the outbreak of the First Schleswig War. He served as chairman of Grosserer-Societetet from 1832 to 1842.

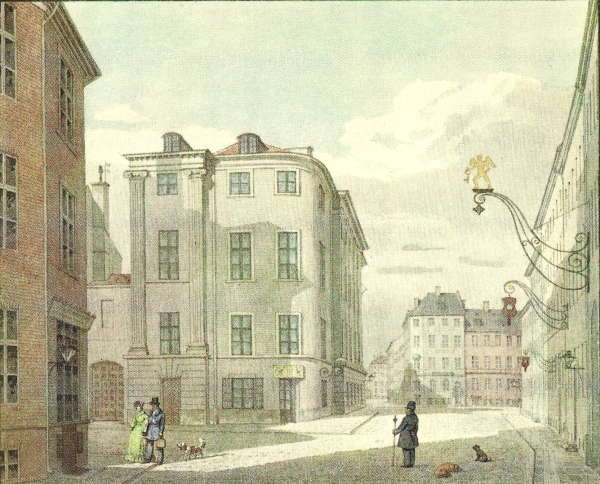
The Tutien House seen in a drawing by H.G.F. Holm, c. 1840

Tutein's eldest son Ferdinand joined his father's company. He married Josepha Aloisia Franciska Romalia Anna Marie Siboni, a daughter of Giuseppe Siboni. The couple moved into the ground-floor apartment of his father's building in Vimmelskaftet. In 1830, Tutein ceded Edelgave to his second-eldest son Friederich Tutein Jr. Yiyein's youngest son Peter Adolph Tutein had acquired Marienborg Manor on Møn in 1821. The daughter Pouline Wilhelmine Vilhelmine Tutein married wholesale merchant Johan Jacob Frölich.

The property was home to 32 residents in four households at the 1740 census. Frederik Tutein resided in the building with his wife Sophie Tutein (née Wraatz), the lady's companion Sophie Palme, husjomfru Louise Weygaard, two male servants, two maids, a female cook, a coachman, a caretaker and a concierge. Ferdinand Tutein, his son and partner, resided on the ground floor with his wife Josephine Tutein (née Sibone), their five children (aged seven to 15), a governess, a female cook, two male servants and two maids. Ane Dorothea Wendt, a widow clothing retailer, resided in the basement with her 18-year-old son Carl Chr. Heinr. Wendt and two maids. Johan Adolph Jørgensen, a turner, resided in another part of the basement with his wife Johanne Frederikke Jørgensen and the apprentice Martin Fred. Lindholm.

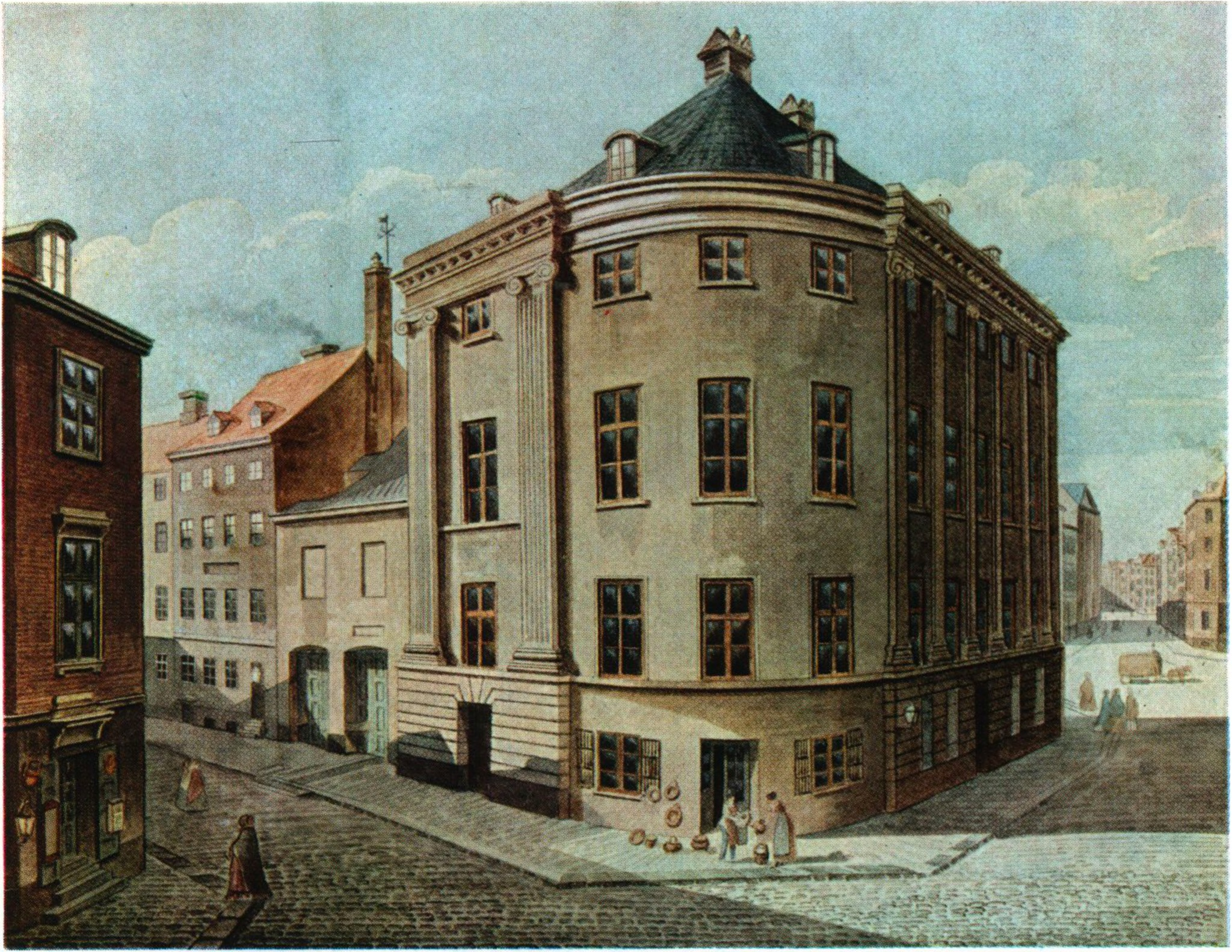
The Tutein House at Vimmelskaftet 47

Friederich Tutein died in 1853. Ferdinand Tutein and his wife took over the first-floor apartment. In 1853, he also purchased Helsingørgade Sugar Refinery.

Ferdinand Tutein's property was home to 19 residents at the 1860 census. Ferdinand Tutein resided on the first floor with his wife Josephine Tutein f. Sibone, their daughter Josepha Anna Maria Tutein, a housekeeper, husjomfru Emma Louise Marie Adolphensen, a maid, a female cook, two male servants, a coachman and a concierge. Daniel Frederik Eschricht. a professor of anatomy and physiology, resided on the ground floor with his wife Mariane (née Petit), a maid and the lodger Ludvig August Nissen, a clothing retailer, resided in the basement with two employees and an apprentice.

=== Reinholdt W Jorck and KTAS ===
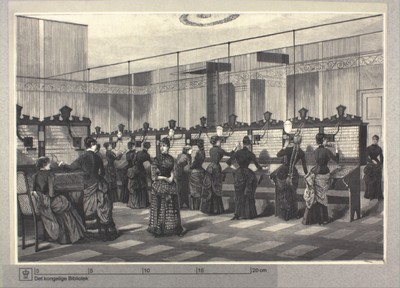
The KTAS central office

In 1880, Reinholdt W. Jorck purchased the property. In 1881–1883, he adapted and expanded the building. The building was heightened with one storey. The new storey was rented out to Kjøbenhavns Telefon-Selskab (KTAS) for use as its first central office. He also replaced the low building in Badstuestræde with a three-bay extension of the corner building.

Jorck would later also acquire Vimmelskaftet 45 og 49 (hvor Grundtvig en overgang boede), Badstuestræde 3, Frederiksberggade 10 og Frederiksberggade 21. He also constructed Jorcks Passage across the street from the Tutein House. KTAS moved its telephone central to this building upon its completion in 1801.

=== Café Bernina, 1881–1953 ===
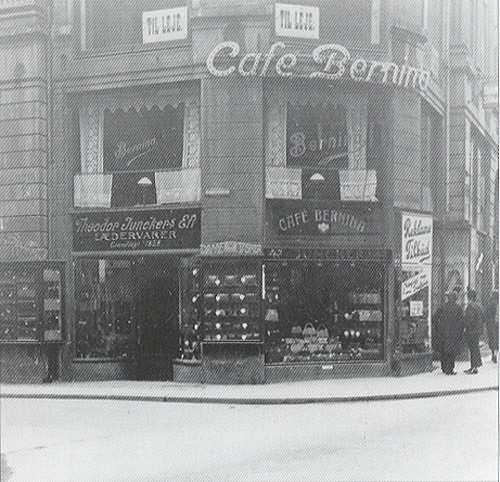
Café Bernina

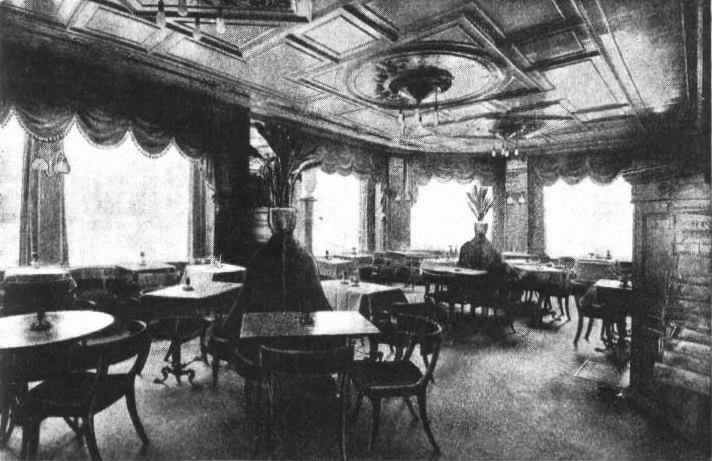
Café Bernina in c. 1900

The two lower floors of the building were also altered. In October 1881, the pastry-baker and wine merchant D. B. Schucani (from Ftan in Graubünden) moved his café from the ground floor of nearby Vimmelskaftet 43 to these new mezzanine with one room with windows to Vimmelskaftet where newspapers were displayed and another with windows to Badstuestræde. His countrymen and colleagues Mini and à Porta from Kongens Nytorv provided a deposit for his investment. The café was given the name Café Bernina after the Bernina Range in south-eastern Switzerland.

In 1885, Schucani sold the café to Poul Tønjachsen. Thanks to its location, namely the proximity to the left-liberal student union Studentersamfundet (Badstuestræde 11), Ove Rohde's short-lived magazine Piraten (Badstuestræde 7) and the newspaper København (Badstuestræde 7), the café became a popular meeting place for journalists, writers and artists. In the inner room with four marble tables and four plush green sofas, almost all of Copenhagen's radical literary elite met, only a few older than thirty. Georg Brandes, Gustav Wied, Agnes Henningsen, Peter Nansen, in the winter of 1893 Knut Hamsun at the same time as Johannes Jørgensen, and also the very young Johannes V. Jensen frequented the only real literary coffee house in the city: Bernina. Many well-known Norwegians also had their Danish base here. One of the highlights was the visit of August Strindberg himself in 1887. It should also not be forgotten that one of the famous regulars was editor Ove Rode from the newspaper Politiken.

In 1906 the management was again taken over by a Swiss from Kongens Nytorv, Gaudenz Gianelli the Younger, who was married to a Danish woman and had been trained by his father. His widow continued to run the café until 1925. It closed its doors in 1953.

=== Photographic studios, 1881–1895 ===
In 1881, Chr. P. L. Wismer opened a photographic studio in the builoding. In 1882, it was taken over by Frederik Dahl & Co. In 1890–1895, it was continued by L. Winther.

=== Later history ===
Nordisk Film-founder Ole Olsen established his first cinema in the building in 1905. The name Bernina was after Café Bernina's closure taken over by a wine shop.

Reinholdt W. Jorch died on 25 December 1909. His portfolio of properties was passed to his son Georg Jorck. The property company Aktieselskabet Reinholdt W. Jorck was founded by him in 1913. By testament, Georg Jorck transferred majority ownership of the property company to two charitable foundations, Reinholdt W. Jorck og Hustrus Fond and Konsul George Jorck og Hustru Emma Jorcks Fond.

== Architecture ==
The corner building Vimmelskaftet 47 was originally constructed with three storeys over a walk-out basement. Jorck's 1881 adaption converted the two lower floors into a street-level ground floor and a low mezzanine. The building has a seven-bays-long facade towards Vimmelskaftetet, a two-bay facade towards Badstuestræde and a bow-shaped corner. The latter was Quist's take on the chamfered corner which was dictated for all corner buildings by Jørgen Henrich Rawert's and Peter Meyn's guidelines for the rebuilding of the city after the Great Fire of 1795, so that the fire department's long ladder companies could navigate the streets more easily. He had already used the same feature at Knabrostræde 19 a few years earlier. The upper part of the facade is finished with giant order Ionic pilasters. The mosaic floor in the entrance at Vimmelskaftet features the name of Bernina and the Swiss cross.

== Today ==
The property is still owned by Jorcks Ejendomme (former Reinholdt W. Jorcjk). The newspaper Kristeligt Dagblad has been based in the building since 2011.

== Cultural references ==
Café Bernina is featured in Gustav Wied's short story "Knipset" (1890) and Christian Krohg's short story "Hos Bernina" (1888).
