= Købmagergade 13 =

Listed building in Copenhagen

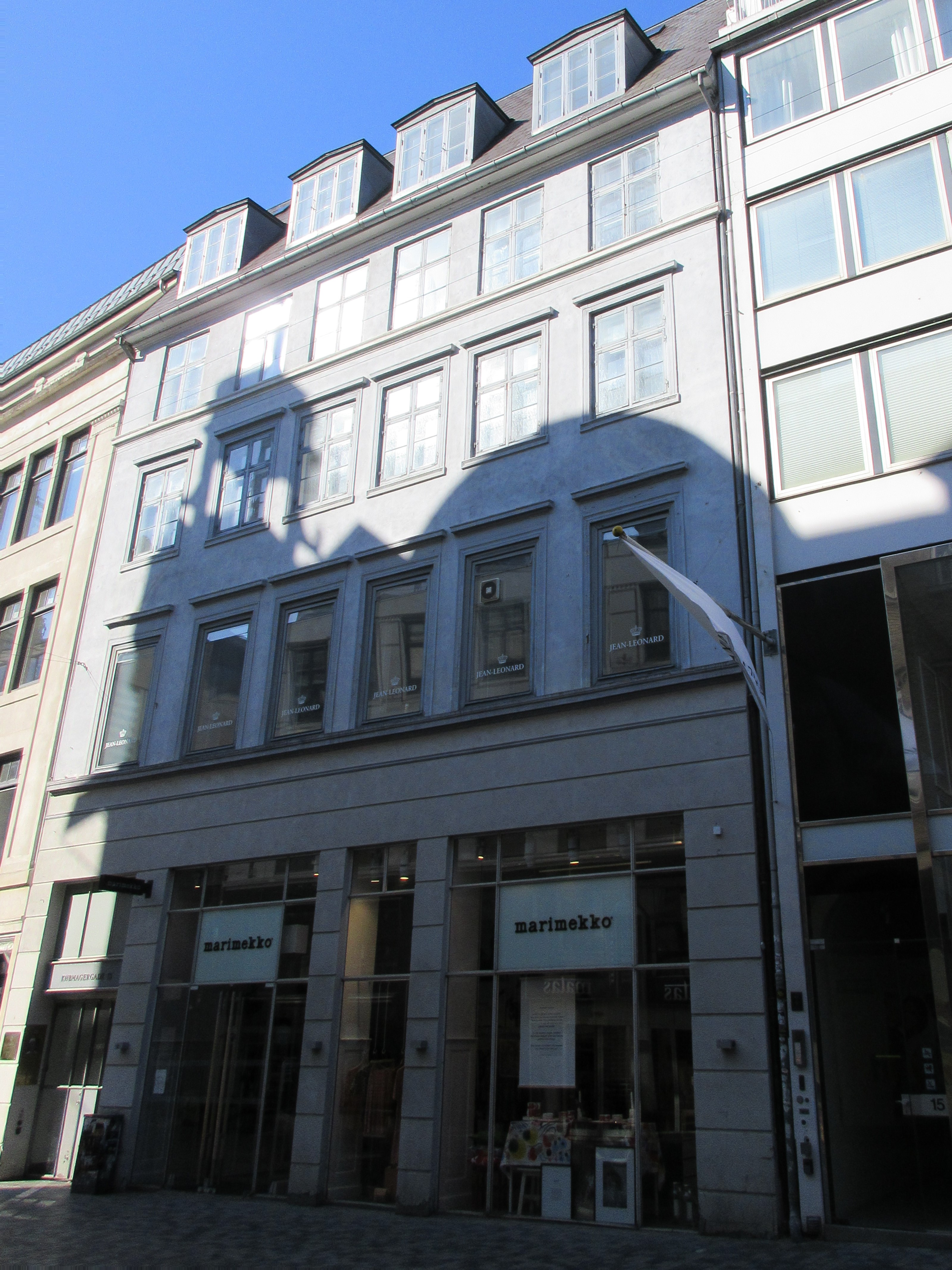
- Interactive map of the Købmagergade 13 area

General information
- Location: Copenhagen, Denmark
- Coordinates: 55°40′47.5″N 12°34′44.29″E
- Completed: 1729–30
- Renovated: 1852

Købmagergade 13 is an 18th-century townhouse situated on the shopping street Købmagergade, between Amagertorv and Valkendorfsgade, in central Copenhagen, Denmark. It was listed in the Danish registry of protected buildings and places in 1974. The complex consists of a four-storey building towards the street, two consecutive, half-timbered side wings along one side of a courtyard, a cross wing, separating the first and second courtyard from each other, another half-timbered side wing along one side of the second courtyard, and two rear wings. Notable former residents include the businessmen Peter Pierre Tutein, Friederich Tutein and Peter van Gemmert, book printer Andreas Seidelin, educator Jens Ernst Wegener and architect Gottlieb Bindesbøll.

== History ==
=== Early history ===
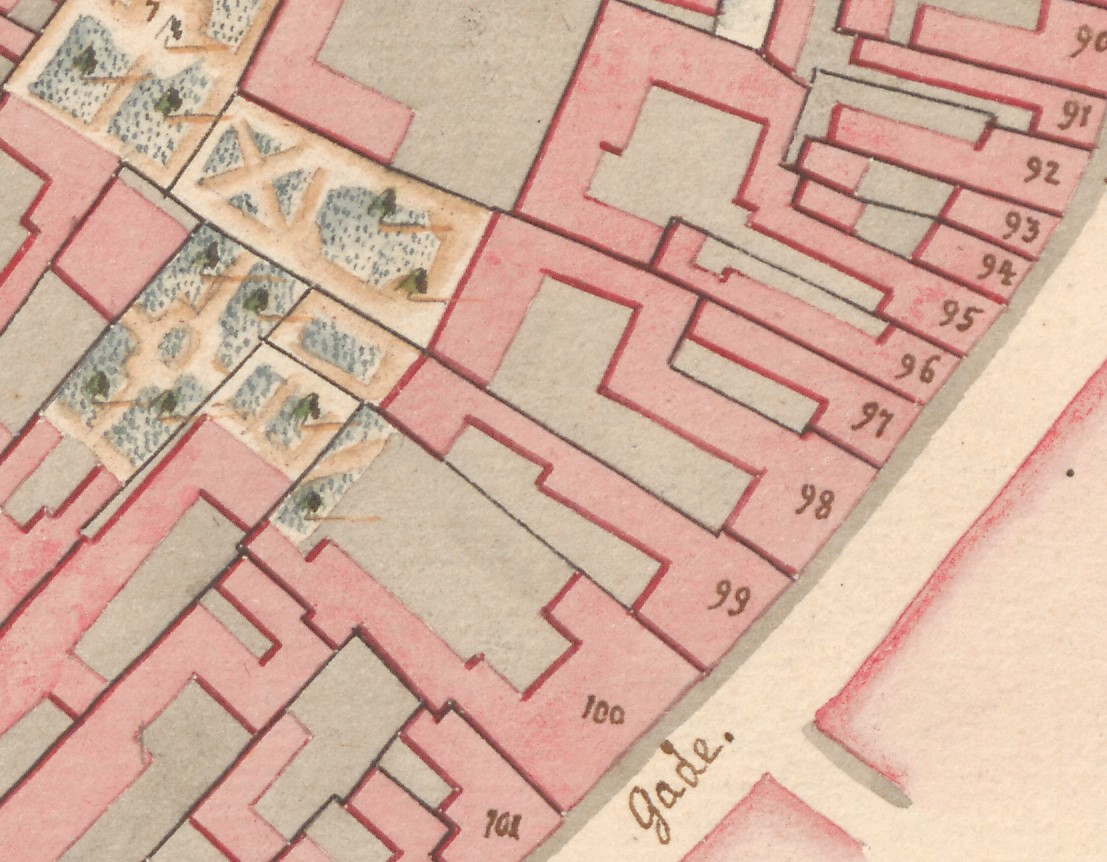
No. 98 seen on a detail from Christian Gedde's map of Frimand's Quarter.

The property was listed om Vopenhagen's first cadastre from 1689 as No. 110 in Frimand's Quarter, pwmed by Lars Schiefing. The property was completely destroyed in the Copenhagen Fire of 1728, together with most of the other buildings in the area. The present building on the site was constructed in 1729–30 for textile merchant Thomas Sauer by master mason Ole Larsen and master carpenter Andreas Reusse (c.1700-1762). The property was listed as No. 98 in the new cadastre of 1756. It was at that time owned by Saur's widow.

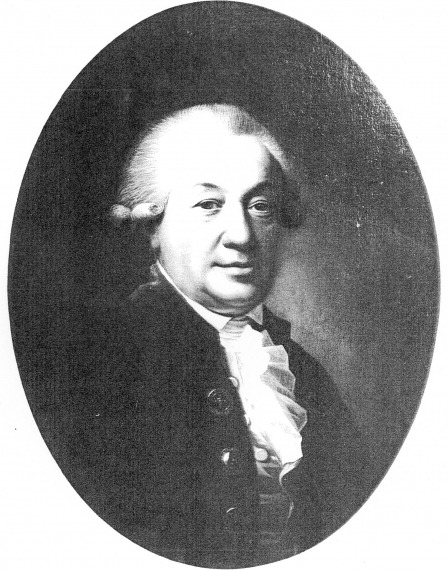
Peter Pierre Tutein

The property was later acquired by merchant and shipowner Peter Pierre Tutein. He resided in the building with his wife Pauline Tutein, their daughter Friderica Tutein, two clerks (skriverkarle), one coachman, one servant, two maids, one caretaker and one lodger (merchant) at the time of the 1787 census.

The property was after Tutein's death in 1799 passed to his eldest son Friederich Tutein (1757–1853). He resided in the building with his wife Sophie Tutein, their four children (aged three to 12), a clerk (fuldmægtig), a housekeeper, a coachman, a servant, a caretaker and three maids at the time of the 1801 census.

Fairly shortly thereafter, he sold the house and bought the Tutein House at the corner of Badstuestræde. The property on Købmagergade was listed as No. 65 in the new cadastre of 1806. It was at that time owned by Andreas Balle.

Peter van Hemert (1734–1810) resided in the building from 1807 to 1810.

=== 1840 census ===
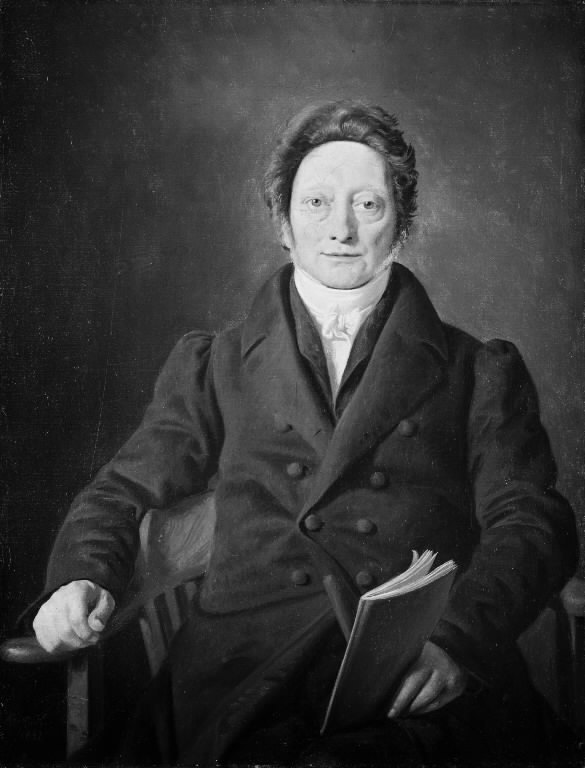
J. Ernst Wegener by Constantin Hansen, 1834

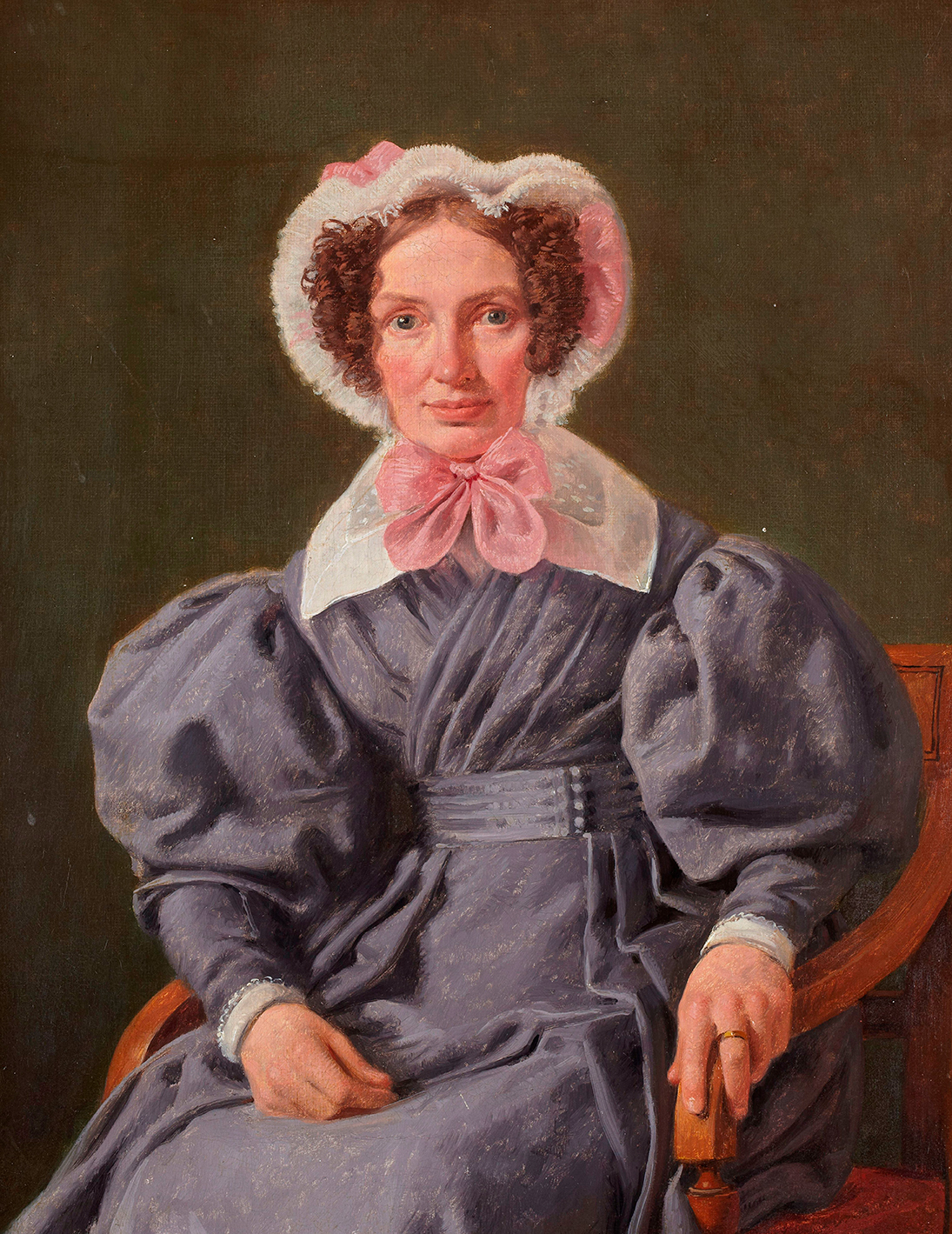
Birgitte Marie Wegener by Constantin Hansen, 1834.

The building was later divided into apartments. It was home to 41 residents at the 1840 census. Andreas Seideling, as of 1818 with title of court book printer, resided on the first floor with his wife aMarie Elisabeth Clausen, their children (aged 11 to 25), an apprentice, a servant and two maids. Johan Bandy, a pastry baker, resided on the ground floor with his wife Betty Caroline Emilie Weincherning, their eight-year-old daughter, two pastry bakers (employees), an apprentice, a servant and a maid. Frederik Pontius Edlund, a master plumber, resided in the basement with his wife Elisabeth Dorthea Clemensen, a plumber (employee), four apprentices and a maid. Jens Ernst Wegener, a writer and former principal of Jonstrup Seminarium, resided on the first floor of the side wing with his wife Birgitte Marie Bindesbøll, the wife's brother Michael Gottlieb Bindesbøll and one maid.

=== 1845 census ===
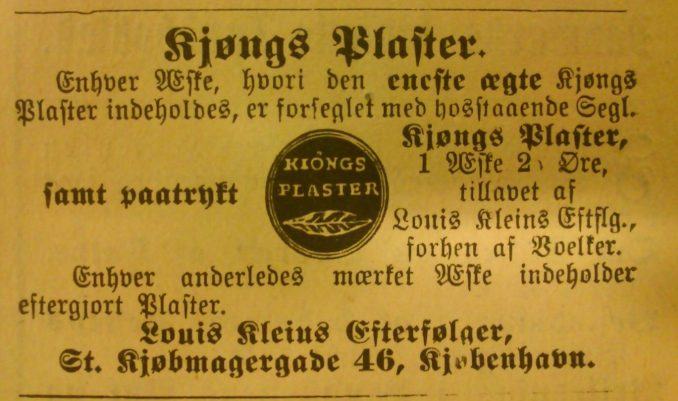
Advert for Køng Plaster.

Seidelin's business was sold to Louis Klein in around 1840. Klein was the son of master baker Louis Klein Sr., whose property (home and bakery) was located just a few houses down the street at No. 62. Klein had recently married Emilie Klein. After the death of her father, possibly by suicide, follow the fire of his property Dalsborg in Snekkersten, she had been raised by her aunt and uncle in Køng. The uncle Christian Gottfried Voelker was manager of Køng Textile Factory. He had also produced the so-called Køng Plaster, a very popular remedy for treating wounds (prepared from red lead, olive oil and camphor). The right to produce this paste had, following his death, been passed down to Emilie Køhlert. She had prior to the wedding produced Køng Plaster in her home at the corner of Kompagnistræde and Badstuestræde (No. 62, now Kompagnistræde 8). It was the sale of Køng Plaster that enabled Klein to buy Seidelin's business since it was used for paying the installments on the property.

The number of residents had increased to 54 in 1845. Louis Klein (1719-), a book printer, resided on the first floor of the cross wing with his wife Emilie Køhlert, their two children (aged five and six), the wife's two sisters, a servant and two maids. Peter Jørgensen Hyltoft, a book binder, resided on the ground floor of the cross wing with his wife Catharina Hyltoft, their two children (aged five and eight), a book binder (employee), three apprentices and a maid. Jacob Lardilli, a new pastry baker, resided on the ground floor with his wife Ursula Lardilli, their three children (aged one to five). his mother Angelina Lardilli, a pastry baker (employee), an apprentice, a servant, a marqueur and a maid. Michael Fahrkld?, a master tailor, resided on the first floor with his wife Maria Cathrine (née Hansen), their five children (aged nine to 16), one servant and one maid. Engelhardt Aagaard, a merchant (urtekræmmer), resided on the first floor with his wife Cathrine, three employees (one of them an apprentice), two servants and a maid. Peter M. Ipsen, another master tailor, resided on the second floor with his wife Anna Magdalene Hirrigsen, their two-year-old daughter, two daughters from the wife's first marriage, a 55-year-old widow and a maid.

=== 1850 census ===
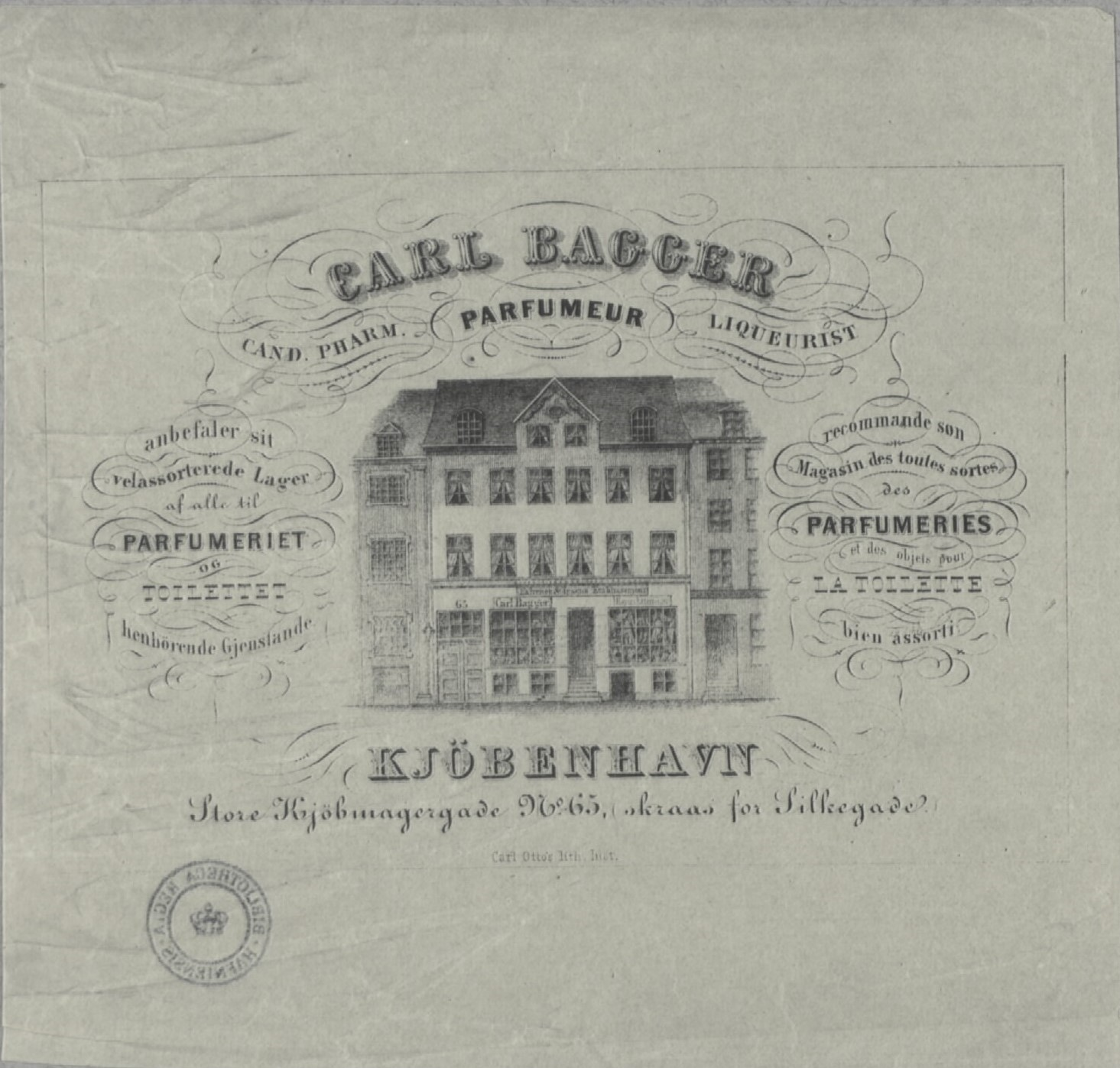
Carl Bagger's perfumery

The property was home to 43 residents in seven households at the 1850 census. Carl Christian Bagger, a 33-year-old pharmacist, had opened a perfumery on the ground floor. Lauge Christof Lasson, a textile merchant, resided on the ground floor with his two children (aged three and eight), two apprentices and two maids. David Emil Funch, a 28-year-old financier (vexelmægler), resided on the first floor with a servant.

Anna Magdalene Ipsen (née Henrichsen), P. M. Ipsen's widow, resided on the second floor with three of her children, her mother-in-law, a male servant and a maid. She was together with her eldest son, who had now become a master tailor, continuing her husband's business.

Johan Jacob Meier, an barkeeper, resided in the basement with his wife Hedvig Martine Meier, their two children (aged one and five), three servants and two lodgers.

Peder Petersen, an instrument maker, resided on the first floor of the cross wing with his wife Carparine Abigel Galle, their four children (aged one to nine) and one maid. Peter Jørgensen Hyltoft, the book binder from the 1845 census, was still residing on the ground floor of the cross wing with his family and employees.

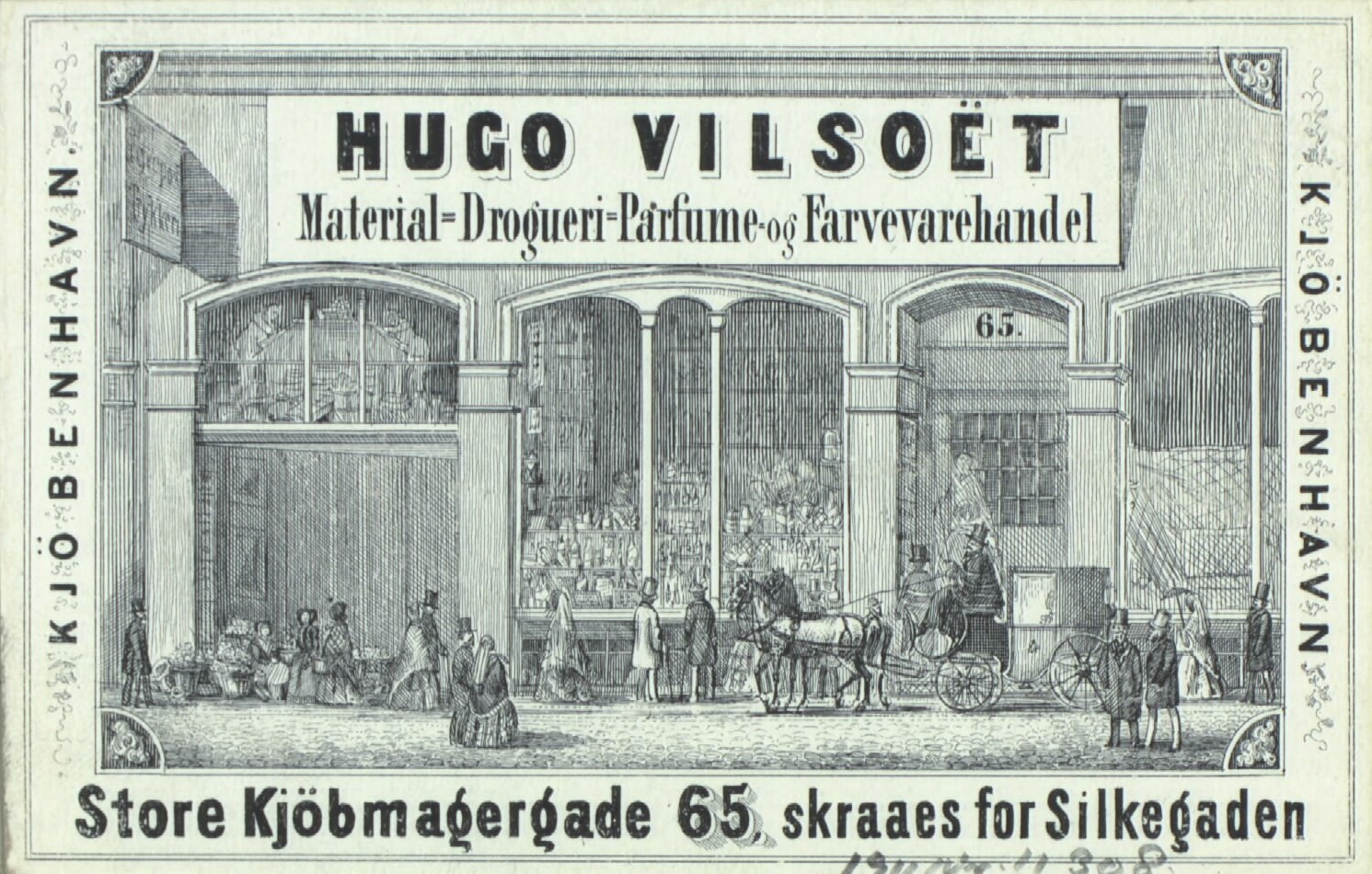
Hugo Vilsoët Material- Drogueri- Parfume- og Farvehandel .

The ground floor of the building was adapted for use as a proper retail space with large display windows in 1952. Carl Bagger's perfumery was at some point replaced by Hugo Vilsoët Material- Drogueri- Parfume- og Farvehandel, a combined pharmacy, perfumery and dye shop.

=== 1860 census ===
The property was listed as Købmagergade 13 when Thorvald Krak instigated the introduction of house numbering as a supplement to the old cadastral numbers in 1859. It was home to 31 residents in five households at the 1860 census. Niels Hansen, a workman, resided on the first floor with his wife Stine Hansen and their three children (aged three to 10). Casper Frederik Christian Thorsøe, a merchant (grosserer), principal of Copenhagen's Craftsmen's School (Håndværkerskolen) and a royal translator, resided on the first floor of the rear wing with his wife Sine Carharine f. Boeskov, their 21-year-old son, a 17th-year-old apprentice and a maid. Georg Ohlendorf, manager of a laundry, resided on the second floor with his wife Anne Marie Ohlendorf f. Olsen, their three children (aged one to nine), their three children (aged one to nine), his mother-in-law Anne Scharlotte Amalie Olsen and one maid. Ole Larsen, a tavern owner, resided in the basement with his wife Kirstine née Rasmussen, their three children (aged one to nine) and six lodgers. Caroline Petersen (née Büllne), widow of a merchant (høker), was also residing in the basement with one maid.

=== Later history ===
The bookseller, magazine publisher and politician Harald Brix (1841–1881) resided on the ground floor from 1869 until his bankruptcy in January 1871.

The property was home to 50 residents in 1880.

== Architecture ==
The building fronting the street is four storeys tall and six bays wide. The plastered facade is finished with shadow koints on the ground floor, a cornice band between the second and third floor and a cornice below the roof. The first and second floor windows are topped by plastered hood moulds. The slate-clad roof features four dormer windows towards the street and three dormer windows towards the yard. An arched gateway in the left-hand side of the ground floor affords access to the courtyard as well as to the three upper floors of the front wing.

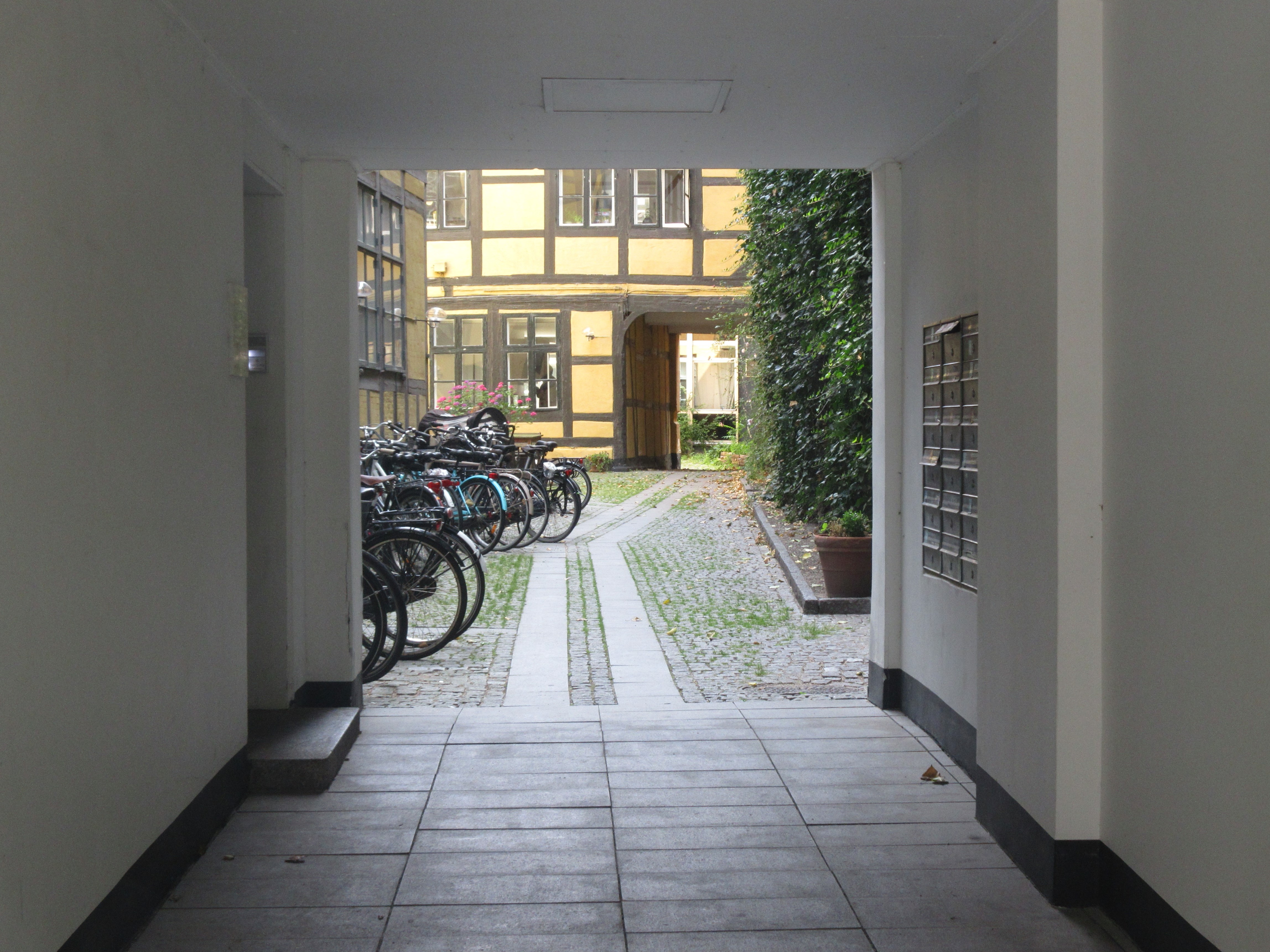
A glimpse of the cross wing through the gate of the front wing.

The half-timbered buildings to the rear of the front wing are finished with yellow-painted, plastered infills and black-painted timber framing. A two-storey. half-timbered, two-storey side wing (before 1759) extends from the rear side of the front wing along the east side of a partly cobbled courtyard. It is followed by a four-storey side wing (1729, heightened 1800). An external staircase constructed in association with the cross wing dates from 1847. The second of the two side wings is attached to a cross wing (1729, heightened 1800), which separates the two courtyards from each other. Another half-timbered side wing extends from the rear side of the cross wing along the east side of the second courtyard. It is attached to one of the rear wings (before 1800 and 1898).

== Today ==
Købmagergade 13 is divided into condominiums. The retail space on the ground floor is owned by AEW Europe. Marimekko is the tenant.
