= Jorcks Passage =

Passageway in Copenhagen, Denmark

Coordinates: 55.6789°N 12.5741°E

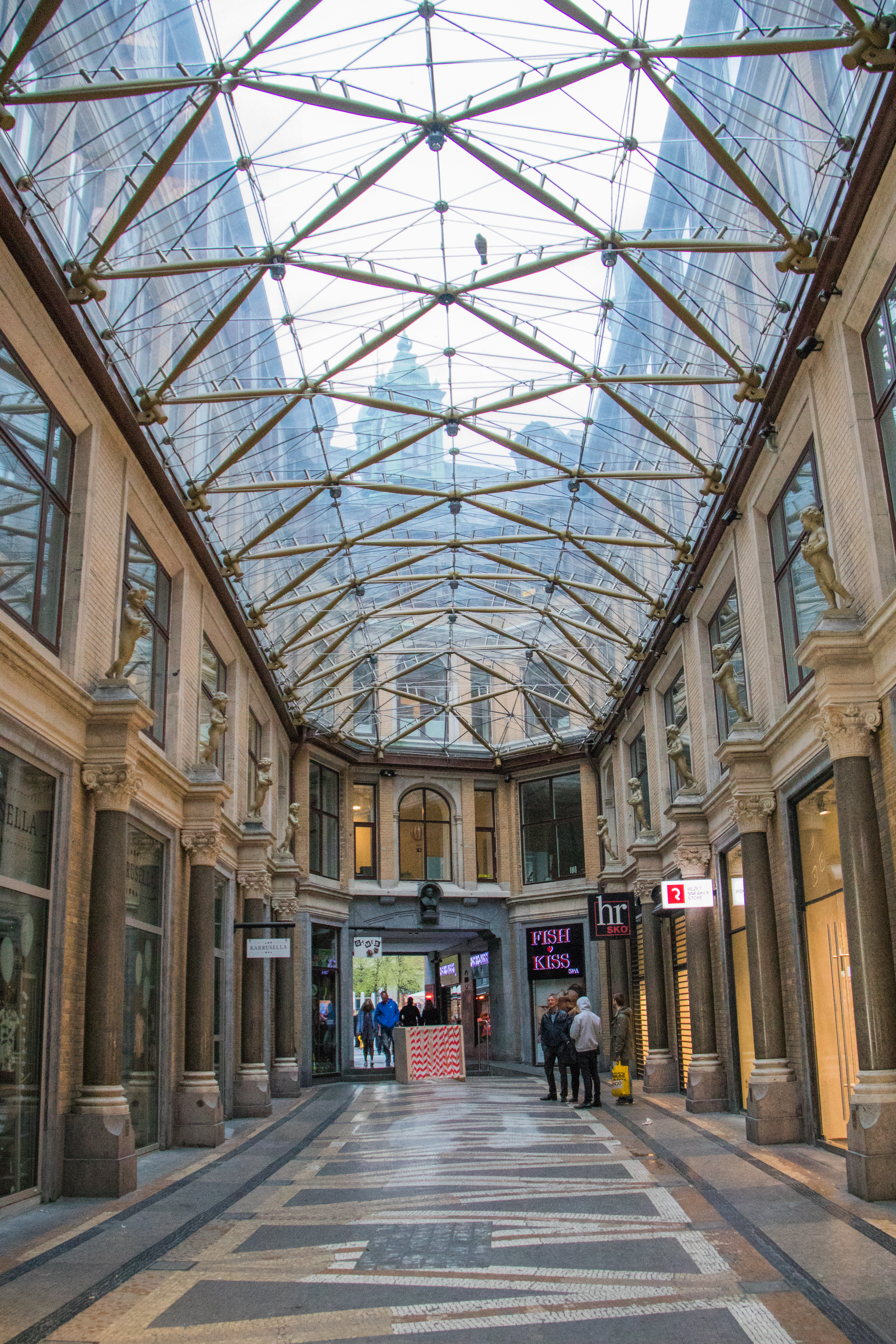
The covered section of the passageway

Jorcks Passage is a passageway and associated building in central Copenhagen, Denmark. It connects the pedestrian street Strøget to Skindergade at the end of Fiolstræde.

== History ==
=== Construction ===
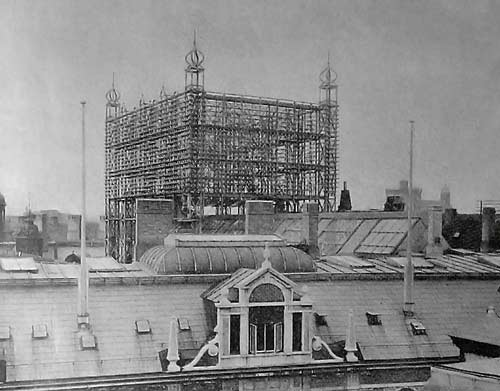
The roof-top structure

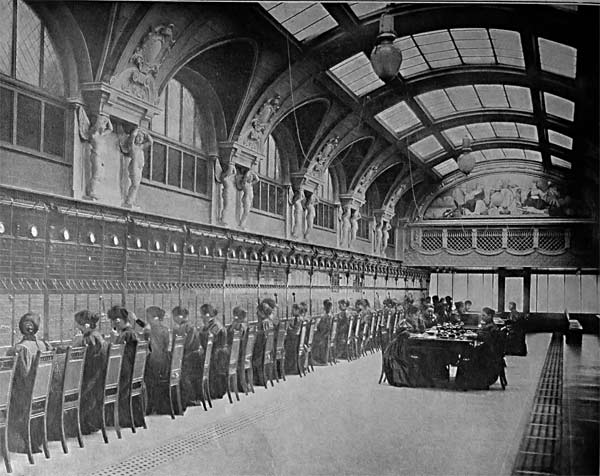
KTAS' telephone exchange which opened in the building in 1896

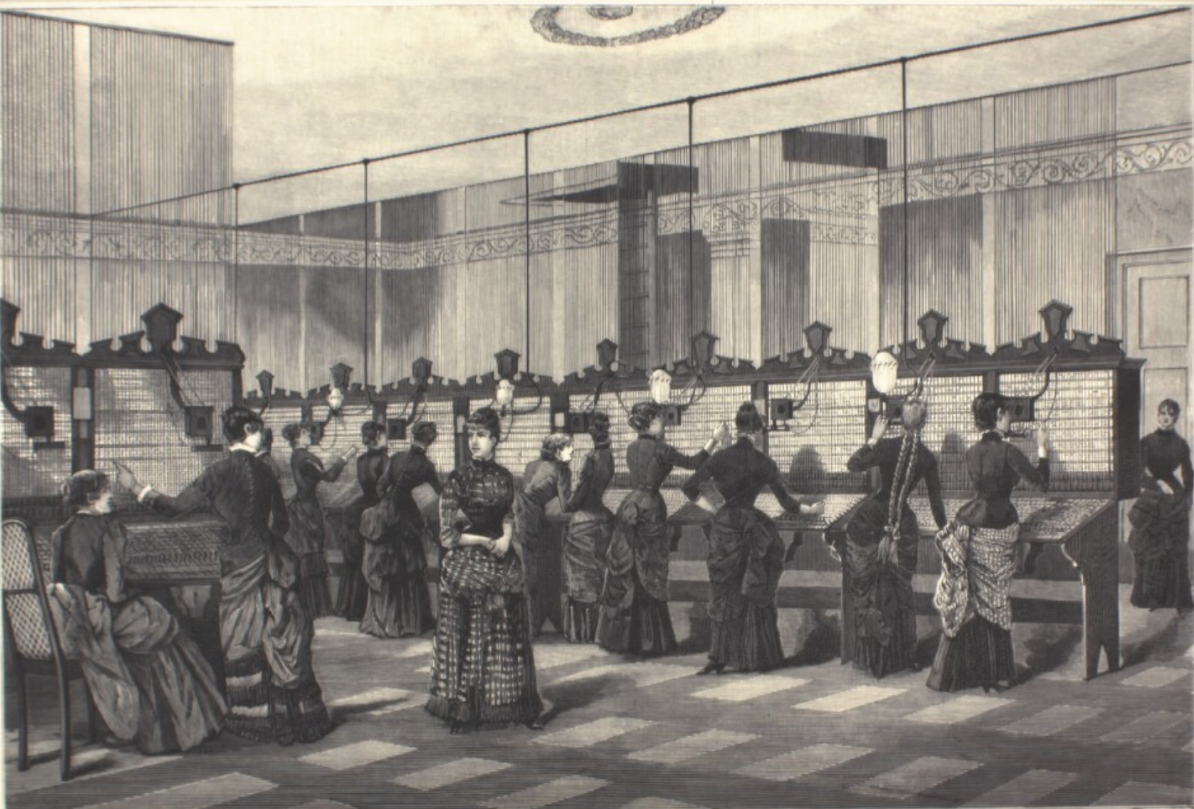
The telephone ladies

Jorcks Passage takes its name after the developer confectionary manufacturer Reinholdt W. Jorck. In 1880, Jorck purchased the Tutein House on the other side of Strøget (Vimmelskaftet 47). The building was heightened and the new top floor which was rented out to the newly founded telephone company KTAS. Jorck built the Jorcks Passage complex when the company ran out of space at their old building. He commissioned Vilhelm Dahlerup to design the building which was constructed between 1893 and 1895.

=== KTAS ===
KTAS opened their first telephone exchange in the premises in 1896. Literally thousands of telephone wires extended from a structure on the roof to customers in the vicinity. KTAS left the building in 1910 when they inaugurated their new Telephone Building (Danish: Telefonhuset) in Nørregade.

=== Other tenants ===
The retail premises at Vimmelskaftet 42 was from 1891 home to the book shop Henriques & Bonfils. It was taken over by Frederik Bøttzauw (1865–1952) and closed in 1952. Frederik Riise operated a photographic studio in the building from 1897 to 1909.

The Danish Radio Foundation (later Danmarks Radio) broadcast their first radio programmes from the building on 24 September 1924 under the name Københavns Radio (English: Copenhagen Radio).

Det Danske Kulkompagni was among the tenants in 1919.

== Architecture ==
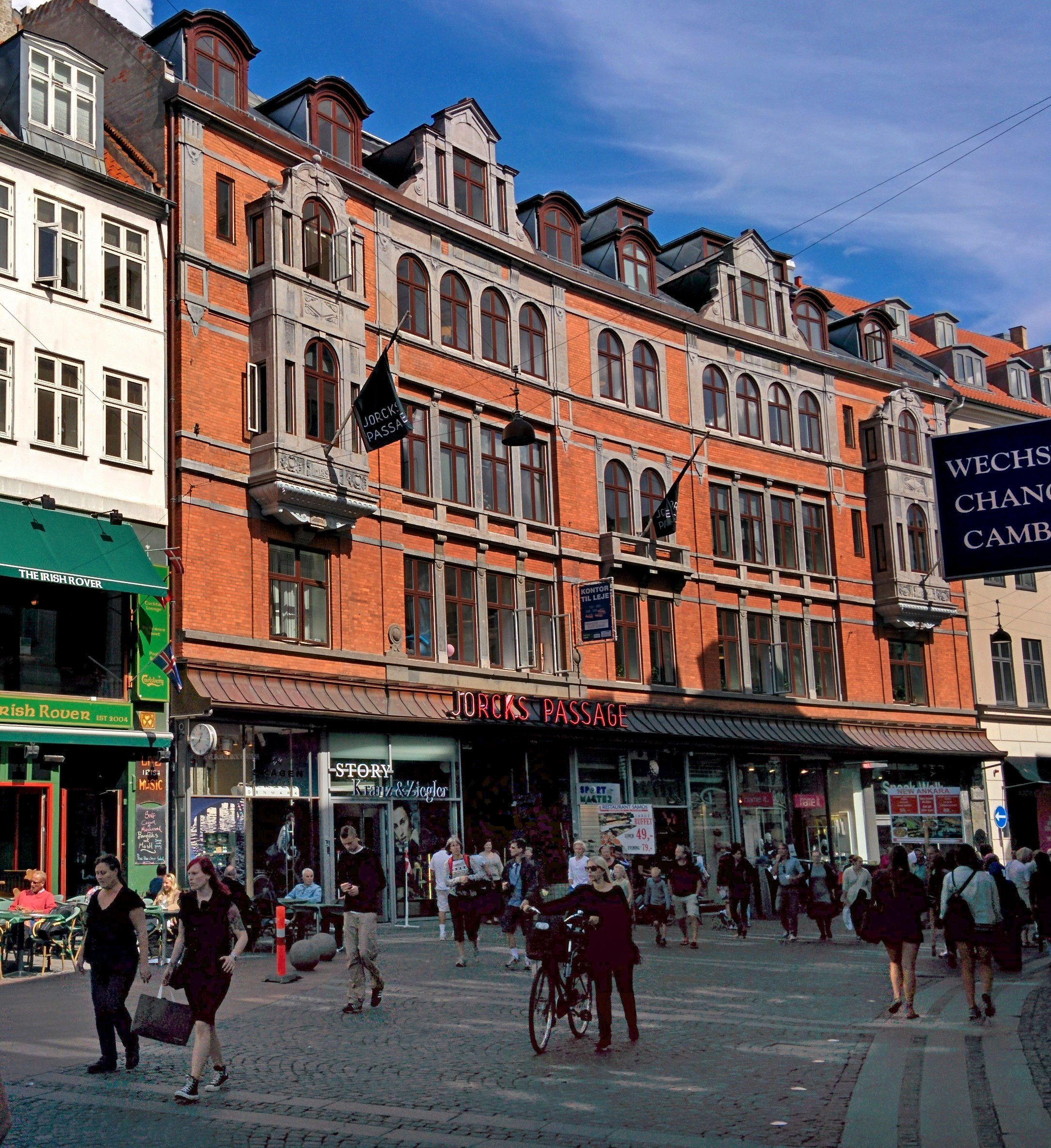
The building viewed from Strøget

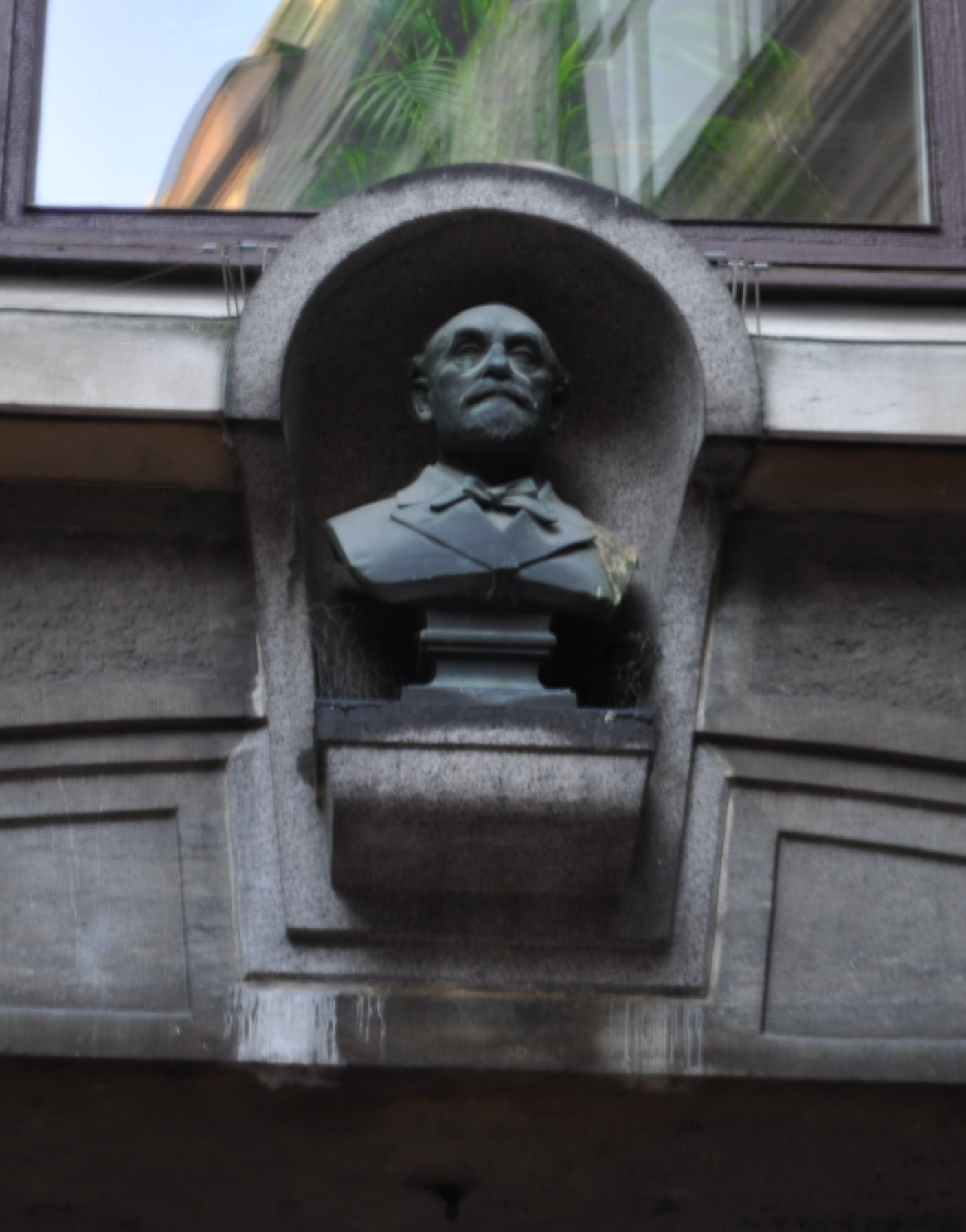
Portrait of Reinholdt W. Jorck

The Historicist building is four storeys high and consists of 11 bays on Skindergade and 12 bays on Vimmelskaftet. It surrounds a narrow rectangular courtyard space which is open at ground level in both ends and lined by retail space along the sides. The passageway is flanked by two rows of columns topped by small statues of toddlers and the floor is paved with mosaics. A bust of Reinholdt W. Jorck is placed in a niche.

== Today ==
The owner Jorcks Ejendomsselskab is based in the building. Tenants include the communications agency Geelmuyden Kiese (Np. 1A).

== See also ==
- Baron Boltens Gård
- Elephant Gate
- Neye
