= Rosenvænget =

Rosenvænget is a neighbourhood in the Østerbro district of Copenhagen, Denmark. Established in circa 1860, it was the first neighbourhood of single family detached homes in Denmark. Many of the old villas have survived but some of them have been replaced by taller buildings in the years after 1900.

The area is bounded by the streets Østerbrogade, Strandboulevarden, Nordre Frihavnsgade, Odensegade, Saabysgade and Næstvedgade. It comprises the streets Rosenvængets Hovedvej, Rosenvængets Sideallé and Kriegersgade.

== History ==
=== Rosenvenge and Rosendal ===
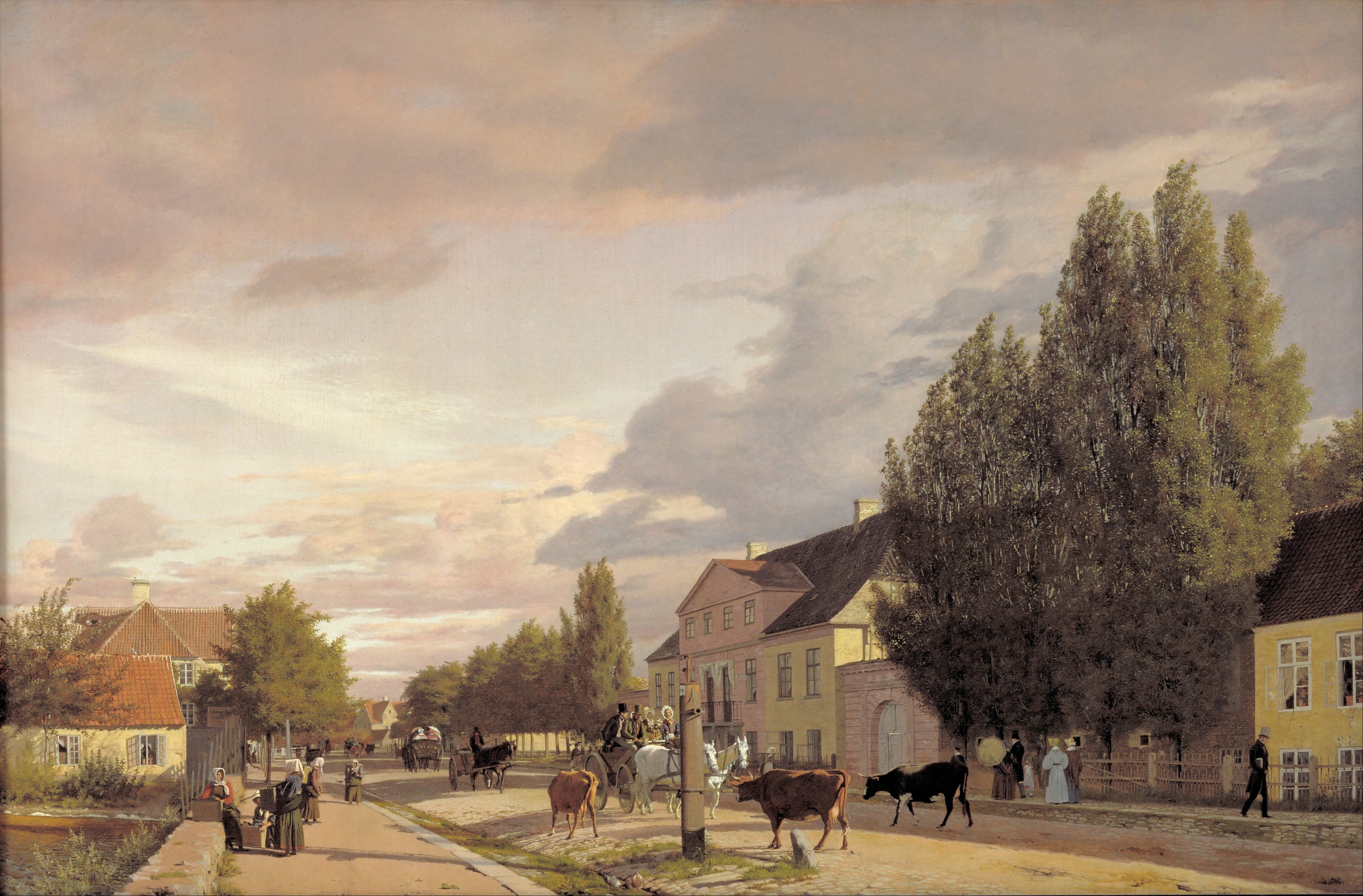
Rosendal seen on a painting by Christen Købke from 1836

The origins of the name can be traced back to 1688 when Jens Toller Rosenheim acquired a large piece of land at the site and renamed it Rosenvenge. He was sent to Ireland in 1689 where he died in Dublin in 1690. In the second half of the 18th centurym Rosenvænget belonged to merchant and ship-owner Reinhard von Iselin.

The country house Rosendal was later built on part of the land. The house was located at the corner of present-day Østerbrogade and Slagelsegade. opposite Sortedam Lake. It was purchased by Friederich Tutein in 1802.

=== Redevelopment of the area ===
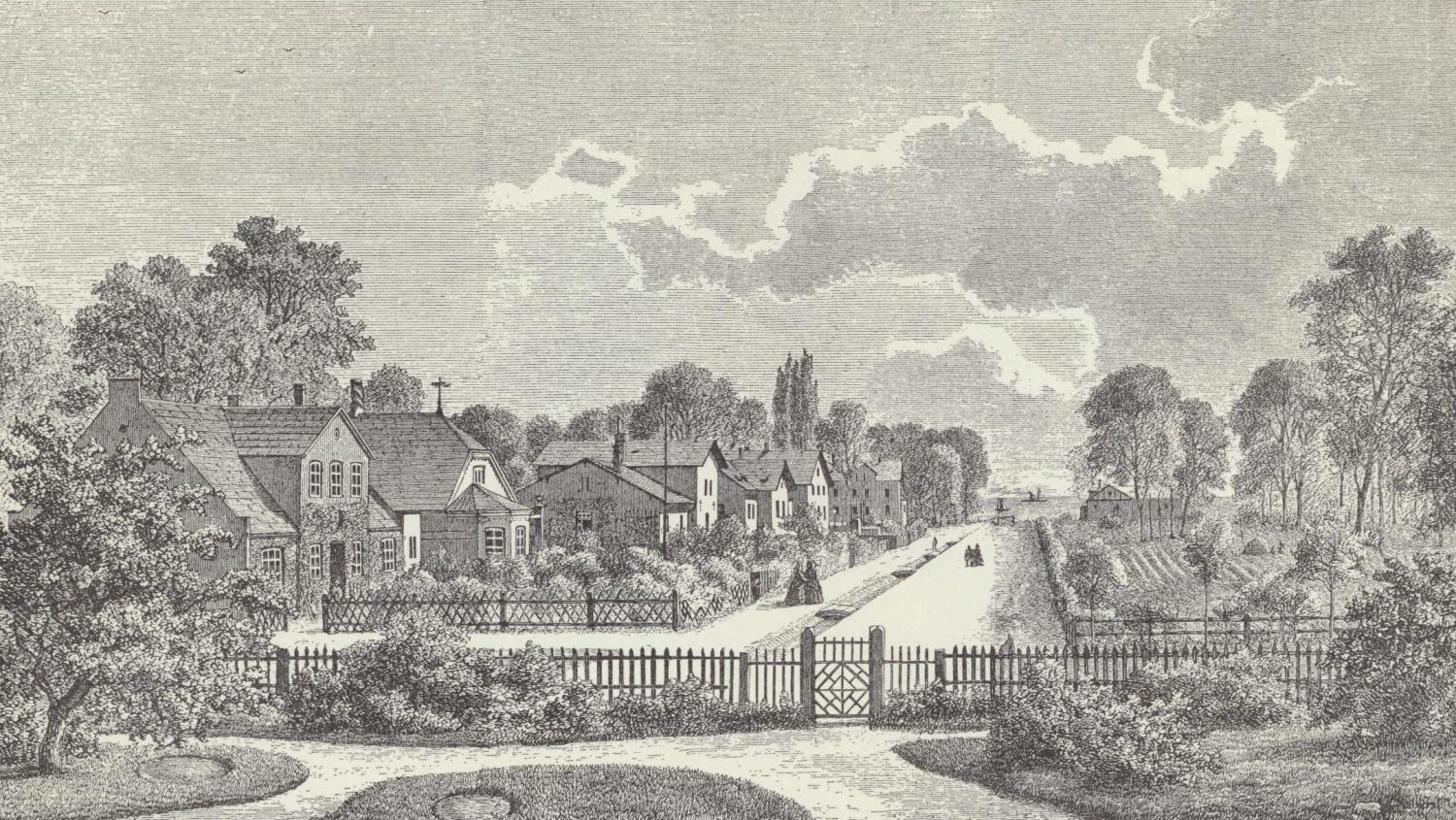
Rosenvænget's main street seen on a woodcarving by Emil Libert from 1863

In 1857, Mozart Waagepetersen bought Rosendal from Friederich Tutein's heirs.

After Copenhagen's old fortification ring was decommissioned and its Eastern City Gate was demolished in 1859, it was decided to sell of the land in lots for redevelopment with large villas for members of the upper middle class. Servitudes ensured that the land could not be redeveloped with multi-storey buildings.
