= Kristeligt Dagblad =

Danish newspaper

- Type: Newspaper
- Owner: Kristeligt Dagblad A/S
- Founded: 1896; 130 years ago
- Language: Danish
- Headquarters: Copenhagen
- Circulation: 26,000 (2013)
- Website: Kristeligt Dagblad website

Kristeligt Dagblad is a Danish newspaper in Copenhagen. The paper was founded in 1896 and is still circulation in the 2000s. It was founded with a Christian orientation.

== History and profile ==
Kristeligt Dagblad was established in 1896. It was an initiative of the Lutheran Inner Mission created to oppose radicalism and atheism. The paper is owned by Kristeligt Dagblad A/S and is based in Copenhagen. It is published six times per week from Monday to Saturday.

Initially, Kristeligt Dagblad was an Evangelical newspaper. The paper was apolitical, publishing articles on religious and moral topics as well as on cultural topics. In 1909, it published anti-evolutionary articles, strongly opposing the views of Charles Darwin. From 1914, the paper took a wider approach and in 1935 broke away from the Inner Mission, presenting general news but without any political association. It gained popularity under the leadership of Gunnar Helweg-Larsen, but lost ground in the 1950s. From 1950, it adopted a new approach, adopting a more lively style with more emphasis on foreign news. The paper does not have any sports section and covers sports-related news occasionally.

The editor of Kristeligt Dagblad is Erik Bjerager.

== Circulation ==
In 1908, Kristeligt Dagblad sold 8,000 copies. During the last six months of 1957, the paper had a circulation of 16,582 copies on weekdays.

During the second half of 1997, the circulation of Kristeligt Dagblad was 16,000 copies on weekdays. The paper had a circulation of 25,000 copies in 2004 and 25,400 copies in 2005. The circulation of the paper was 25,143 copies in 2008 and 25,718 copies in 2009. It grew to 26,267 copies in 2010 and to 26,301 in 2011. The paper had a circulation of 26,000 copies a day in 2013.
