= Peter Pierre Tutein =

German-Danish merchant and industrialist

Friederich Tutein
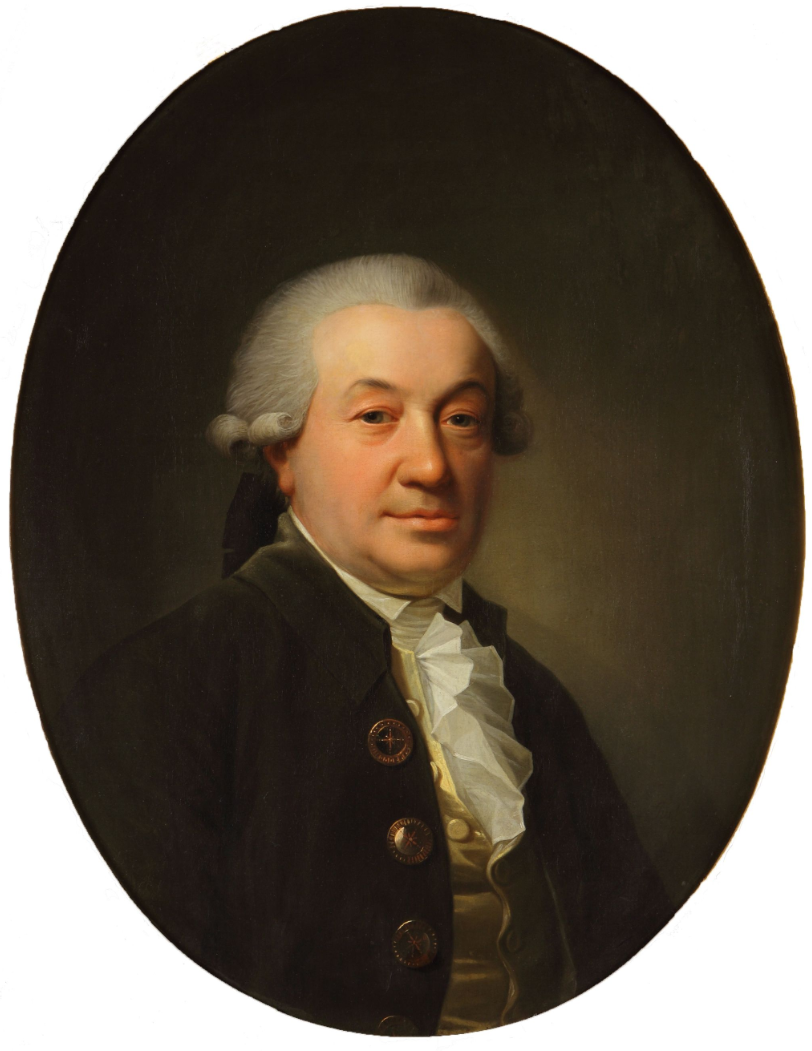
- Born: 11 October 1726; Mannheim, Holy Roman Empire
- Died: 7 December 1799 (aged 73); Copenhagen, Denmark
- Occupations: Merchant and industrialist

Peter Pierre Tutein (11 October 1726 – 7 December 1799) was a German-Danish merchant and industrialist. In 1747, he established a thriving trading house in Copenhagen, trading in the Danish colonies with his own fleet of merchant ships. He ran the company from his home at Købmagergade 13. His son Friederich Tutein continued the company under the name Fr. Tutein & Co. after his father's death.

== Early life and education ==
Tutein was born in Mannheim, the son of Pierre Tutein and Elisabeth Henri. He apprenticed as a merchant in Landau.

== Career ==
Tutein moved to Copenhagen in 1748 where he managed Peter De Windtz' trading house after Windtz' death. In 1756 he established his own trading house. It soon developed into one of the most successful in the city. He traded in the Danish colonies with his own ships and had close ties to the Danish Asiatic Company. A few of his ships participated in the triangular trade. He mainly traded colonial goods such as coffee and sugar. He was one of the largest importers of coffee to Denmark of his time.

Tutein was also involved in a number of industrial enterprises. He became the owner of a stockings factory through his marriage. He also became a partner in Reinhard Iselin's calico factory in Klampenborg which was relocated to Østerbro in 1766. In 1779, Tutein was granted a license to establish a silk ribbon factory on Blågård in Nørrebro but gave up the plans and sold the property to the government later that same year.

Tutein was a member of the Grosserer-Societetet, a wholesaler organization, from 1769. By the late 1780s, his company had grown to become the third largest trading house in Copenhagen, surpassed only by those of Niels Ryberg and Frédéric de Coninck.

== Personal life ==
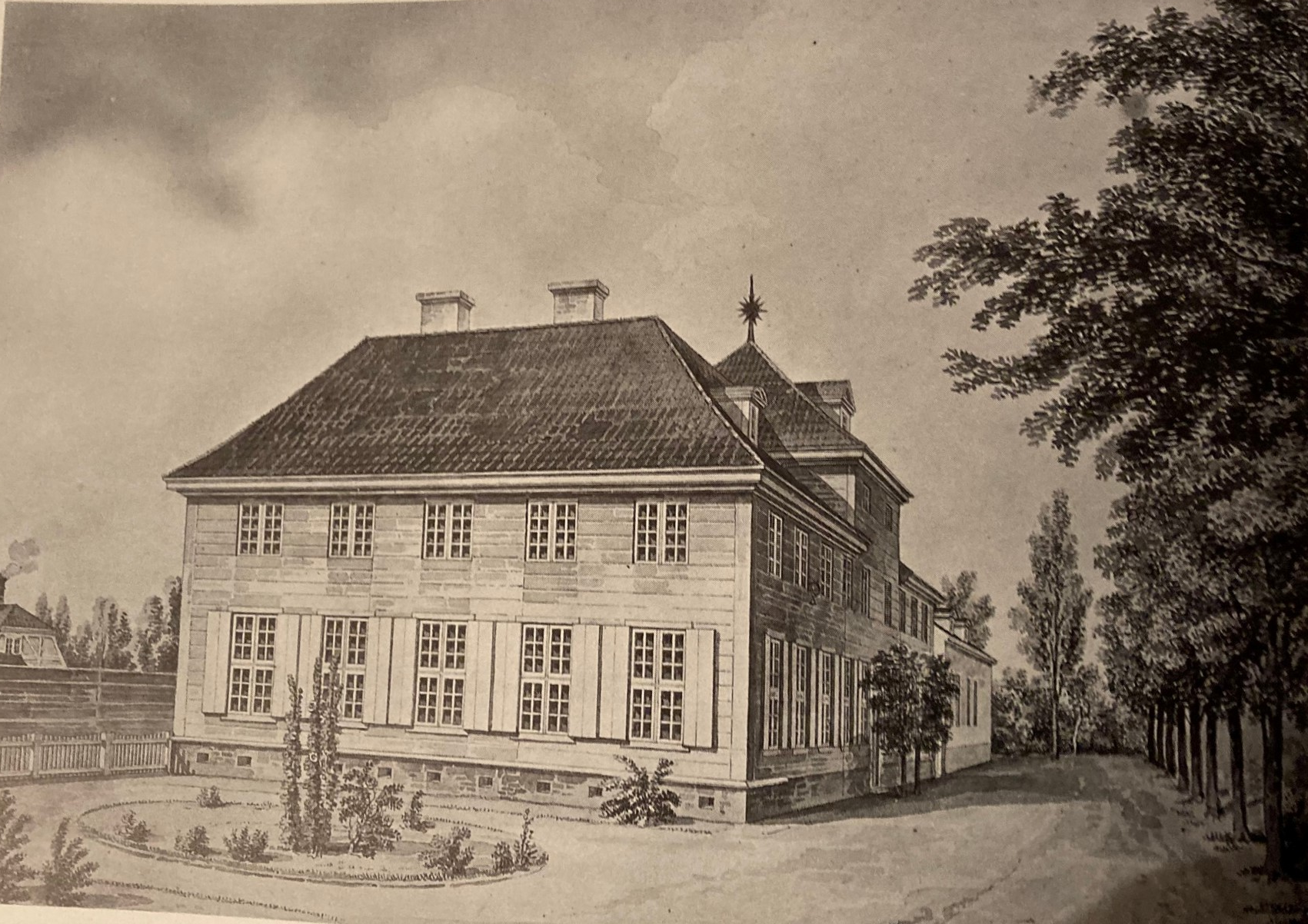
Sneglebakken

On 12 May 1756, in St. Peter's Church, Tutein was married to Pauline Maria Tutein. She had previously been married to Jacob Ernst Bruckner but he had died the previous year.

Tutein's city home was at Købmagergade 13. He also owned the country house Sneglebakken in Lyngby from 1783. He died on 7 December 1799 and was buried in Assistens Cemetery but his remains were later moved to Hvedstrup Church.

Tutein left one son and three surviving daughters (two daughters died as infants). The son, Friederich Tutein, continued the family's trading house under the name Fr. Tutein & Co. after his father's death. The eldest daughter, Pauline Louise Tutein (8 March 1761 – 4 December 1827), married Peter Tutein (22 November 1752 – 11 January 1828). Another daughter, Pauline Dorothea Tutein (31 March 1764 – 18 April 1814), married Hartvig Marcus Frisch. The youngest daughter, Friederica Tutein (20 June 1768 – 17 July 1844), married Thierry Diederich Tutein.
