= Badstuestræde 7 =

Building in Copenhagen

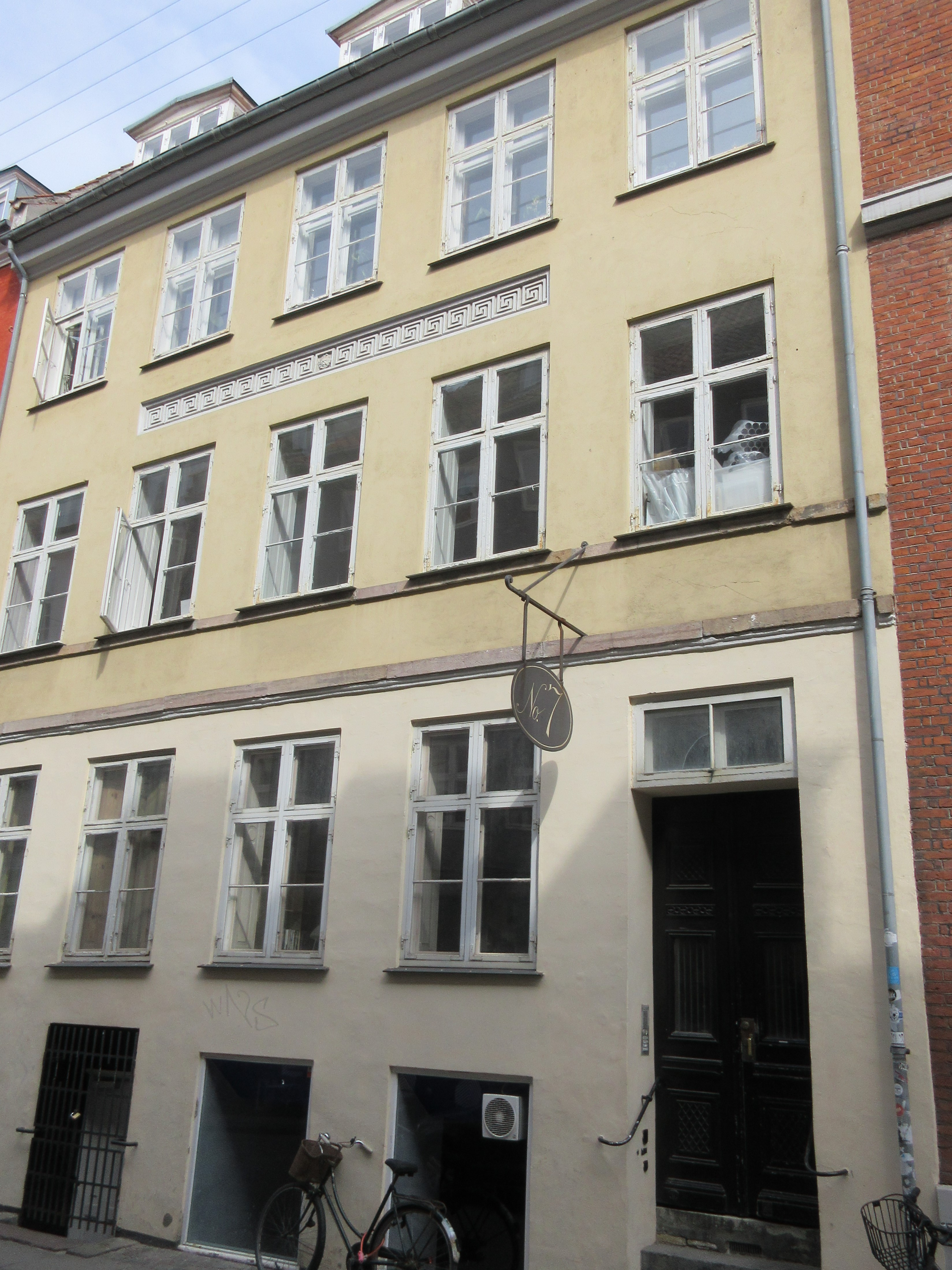
- Interactive map of the Badstuestræde 7 area

General information
- Architectural style: Neoclassical
- Location: Copenhagen, Denmark
- Coordinates: 55°40′41.52″N 12°34′30.9″E
- Completed: 1687

Badstuestræde 7 is a Neoclassical property situated off the shopping street Strøget in the Old Town of Copenhagen, Denmark. The building was like most of the other buildings in the street constructed in the years after the Copenhagen Fire of 1795. It was listed in the Danish registry of protected buildings and places in 1964.

== History ==
=== 18th century ===
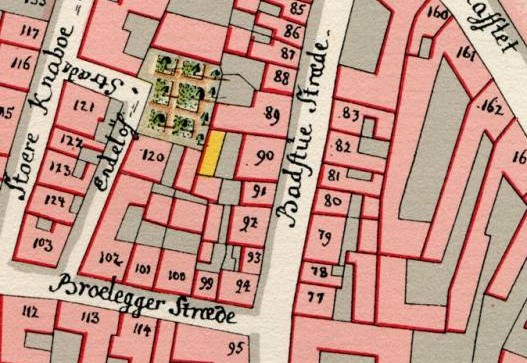
No. 80 and No. 81 seen on Gedde's district map of Snaren's Quarter from 1757

The site was in the late 17th century made up of two separate properties. One of them was as No. 94, in Snaren's Quarter (Snarens Kvarter) owned by shoemaker Iver Jørgensen. The other one was as No. 95, owned by Anders Jonsen's widow.

The old No. 94 was listed in the new cadastre of 1756 as No. 80 and belonged to shoemaker Mathias Svane. The old No. 95 was as No. 81 owned by tailor Niels Nielsen.

The two properties were both destroyed in the Copenhagen Fire of 1795, together with most of the other buildings in the area. They were subsequently merged into a single property. The present building on the site was constructed in 1796-1798 for master carpenter Andreas Brendstrup.

=== 19th century ===
The property was fairly shortly after its completion sold to tailor Johan Carl Drewsen. His property was home to 34 residents in eight households at the time of the 1801 census. The 40-year-old daughter resided in one of the apartments with his wife Ane Marie Bendison, their three daughters (aged two to five), his mother Anne Magdalene Sund, an apprentice and a maid. Christian Samuel Heisse, a treasurer, resided in the building with his second wife Carine Marie Holm and their three children (aged seven to 15). Sara Marthe Holm, Carine Marie Holm's mother, resided in the building with one maid. Ellen Lorentze Engmand, a 65-year-old widow, resided in the building with her 35-year-old daughter Christine Sophie Engmand and one maid. Thomas Hansen, a beer seller (øltapper), resided in the building with his wife Maren Rasmusdatter and their two children (aged one and five). Carl Taube, a master carpenter, resided in the building with his wife Anna Neergaard, their two-year-old son and one maid. Jens Christensen, rodemester of Snaren's Quarter, resided in the building with Kirstine Heegaard and one maid. Christian Peder Næboe, a master goldsmith, resided in the building with his wife Juliane Margrethe Gliese, their one-year-old daughter, one apprentice and one maid.

Drewsen's property was in the new cadastre of 1806 as No. 131.

No. 131 was home to a total of 29 people at the time of the 1840 census. The now 80-year-old Drewsen resided in one of the two ground floor apartments with his wife, two unmarried daughters and two lodgers. Peter Trasborg, a beer seller (øltapper), resided in the other ground floor apartment with his family, staff and lodgers. Pierre von Røepstorff (1798-1857), a decommissioned army captain who had served in Tranquebar, resided on the first floor with his wife, three children and one maid. Rudolph Meyer, a musician in the Royal Danish Orchestra, resided on the second floor with his wife, five children and one maid.

The property was listed as Badstuestræde 7 when house numbering by street was introduced as a supplement to the old cadastral numbers (by district) in 1859. The property was home to a total of 25 people at the time of the 1860 census. Carl Ludvig Hansen, a wine merchant, was residing with his wife, four children and three maids on the first floor.

Henning Matzen (1840-1910), professor of law at the University of Copenhagen, resided in the ground floor apartment in the years from 1871. The composer and organist Johan Christian Gebauer (1808-1884) was among the residents in the years around 1881.

Ove Rode's and Johan Knudsen's newspaper København was from 1890 published from its premises on the first floor. It was in 1892 sold to Per Brøndum Scavenius. People who wrote for the newspaper while it was based in Badstuestræde include Helge Rode, Viggo Stuckenberg, Gustav Wied, Lorry Feilberg, Carl Ewald, Agnes Hemmingsen, Gustav Esmann and Sophus Claussen.

== Architecture ==
The building consists of three storeys over a raised cellar. The main entrance is topped by a transom window. Between the three central windows of the second and third storeys is a meander frieze. A three-bay perpendicular side wing extends from the rear side of the building. The property was listed in the Danish registry of protected buildings and places in 1953.

== Today ==
As of 2008, Badstuestræde 7 was owned by the Danish Nurses' Organization. Badstuen, a combined coffee shop and cocktail and beer bar, has since 2017 been based in the basement.
