= Edelgave =

Manor house in Denmark

Coordinates: 55.7253°N 12.2575°E

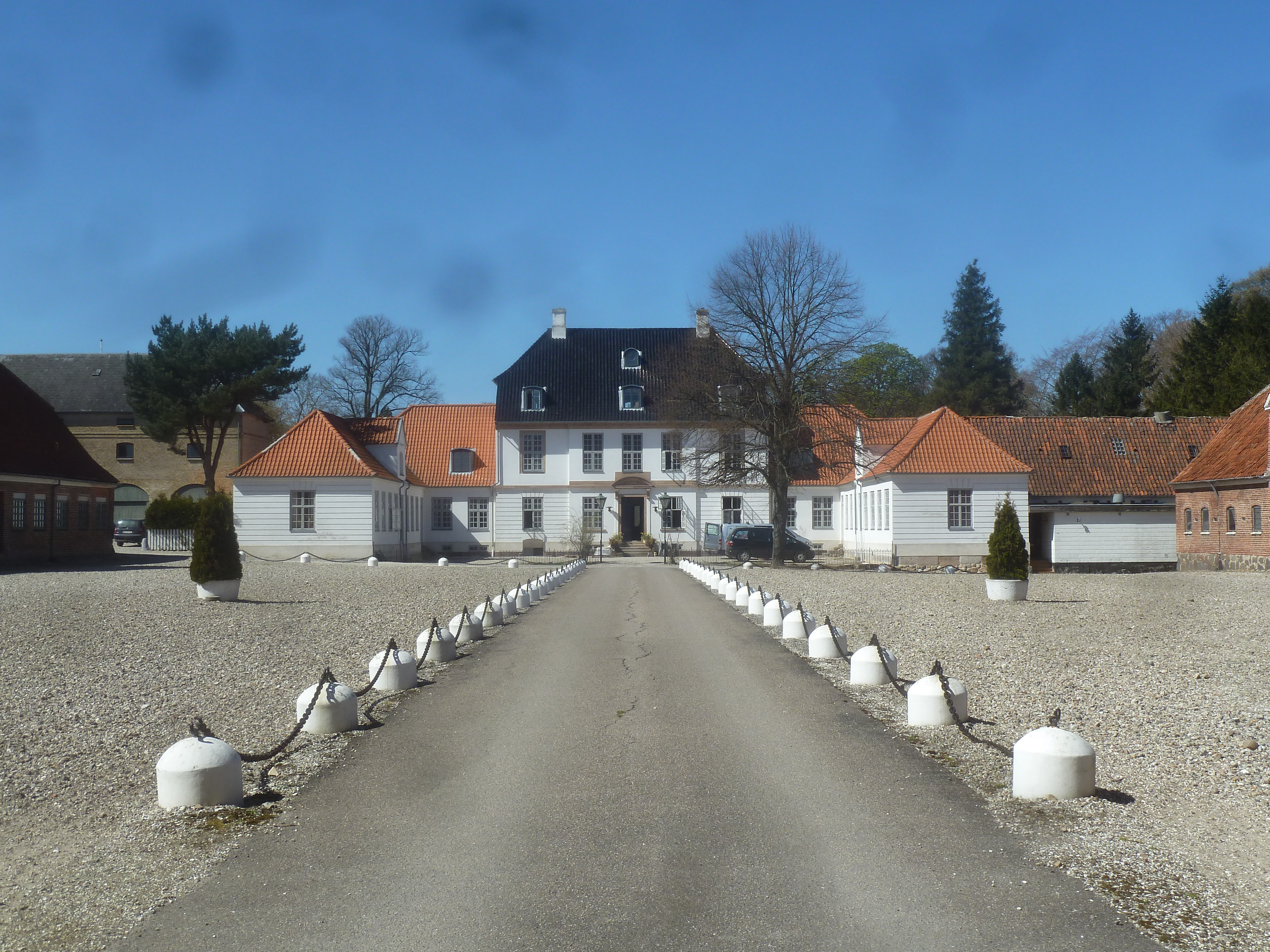
Edelgave

Edelgave is a manor house situated just southwest of Smørumnedre, Egedal Municipality, 20 km northwest of central Copenhagen, Denmark. The current main building was designed by Andreas Kirkerup and is listed.

== History ==
=== 17th century ===
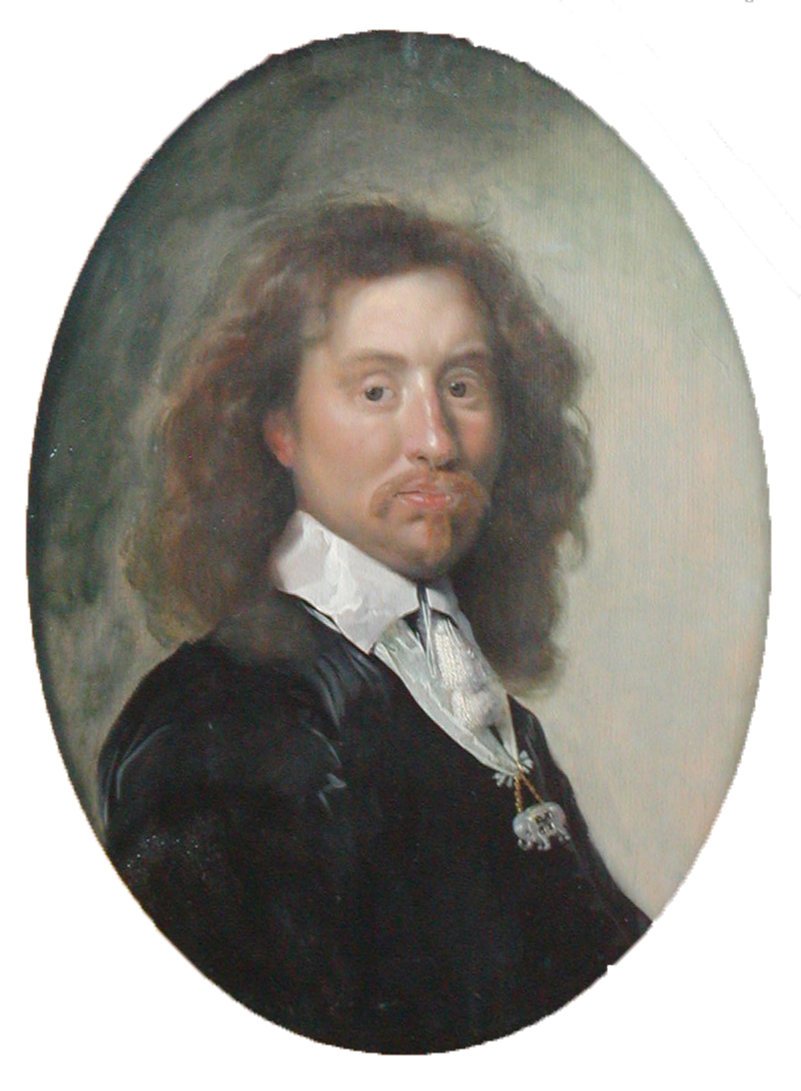
Portrait of Henrik Bjelke by Karel van Mander III

The area is first mentioned in 1307 when Cecilie Jonsdatter left it to Esrum Abbey in her will and the property is later known as Rompe.

The property was from about 1600 owned by the crown. The farm was destroyed in the two Dano-Swedish Wars (1657-1660). In 1663, Frederik III granted the property to Admiral of the Realm Henrik Bjelke and his wife Edel Ylfeldt for life. Five years later, the king created a deed which ceded the property to Edel Ulfeldt and her descendants. It mentions the name "Edelgave" as the name of a future manor house at the site. Bjelke expanded the estate with several new tenants farms prior to its elevation to manor house in 1682. He also constructed a new half-timbered, three-winged main building.

Henrik and Edel Bielke's son Christian Bielke was married to Vibeke Juel, daughter of Admiral Niels Juel.

=== 18th century ===
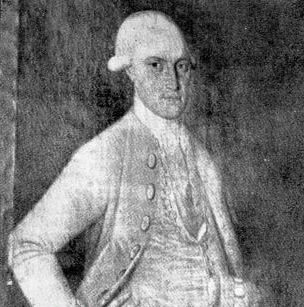
Christian Lange

In 1799, Vibeke Bielke sold the estate to Henrik Weldingh. It was later passed on to his son Christian Weldingh. Upon his death in 1759, it was sold in public auctionfor 22,800 rigsdaler to Anne Marie Bornemann. She was the widow of Ph. J. Bornemann.

The house was destroyed by fire in the early 1780s. The owner, Jakob Bornemann, commissioned Andreas Kirkerup to build a new house which was completed in 1791. The property had in 1787 been sold to Hans Georg Faith (1751–1795) for 60,000 rigsdaler. In 1791, he sold the estate to county manager (amtsforvalter) Jakob Rosted for 69,000 rigsdaler.

In 1798, Edelgave was acquired by Christian Lange (1854–1823) for 88,100 rigsdaler. Lange was already the owner of Nørre Alléenlyst in Frederiksberg outside Copenhagen as well as a number of estates in Jutland. In 1797, he had sold Eskjær. In 1805, he also sold Skivehus.

In 1806, Lange sold Edelgave to J. Bartholin-Eichel for 100,000 rigsdaler.

=== Tutein family ===
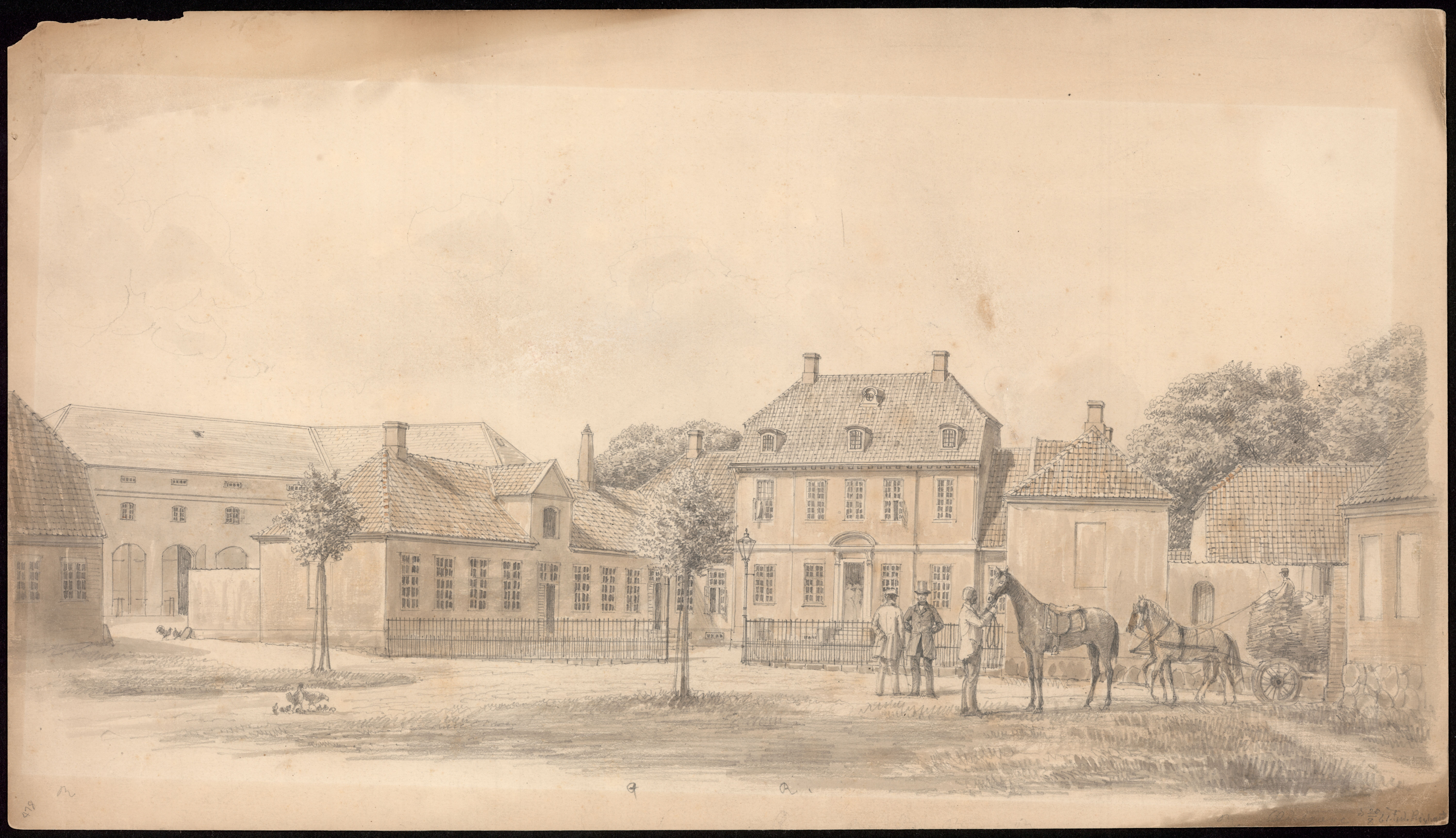
Edelgave in 1861.

In 1808, Edelgave was acquired by Friederich Tutein for 134,000 rigsdaler. In 1830, he ceded the estate to his son Friederich Wilhelm Tutein. Edelgave remained in the hands of the Tutein family for the next almost one hundred years.

=== Later history ===
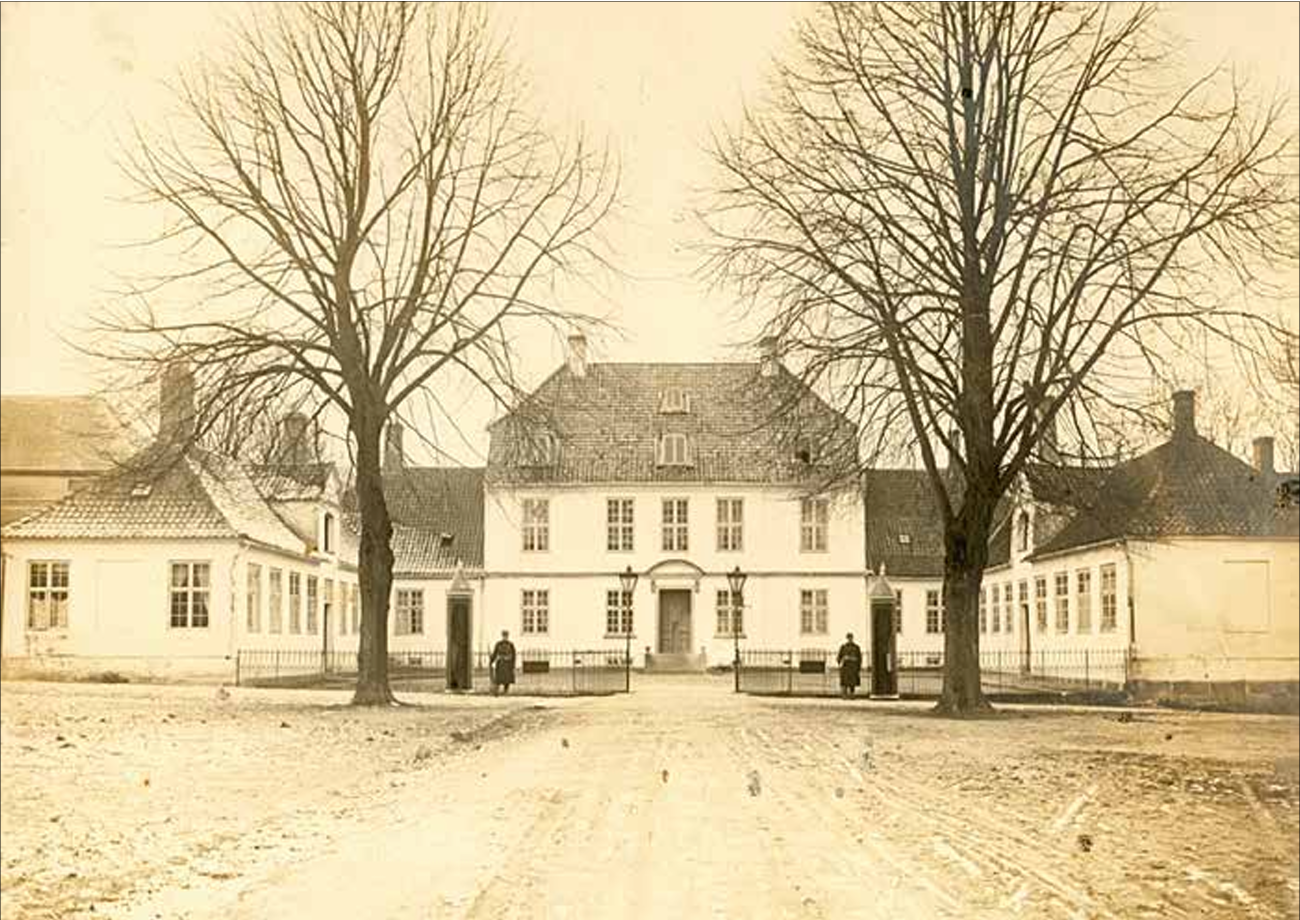
Edelgave in c. 1914.

From 1921 to 1943, it was owned by Th. Madsen-Mygdal who later became prime minister. From 1958 to 1992, Edelgave was owned by Gudmund Jørgensen, the founder of Vallø Saft, a fruit juice company based at Køge, who planted most of the land with fruit trees.

== Architecture ==
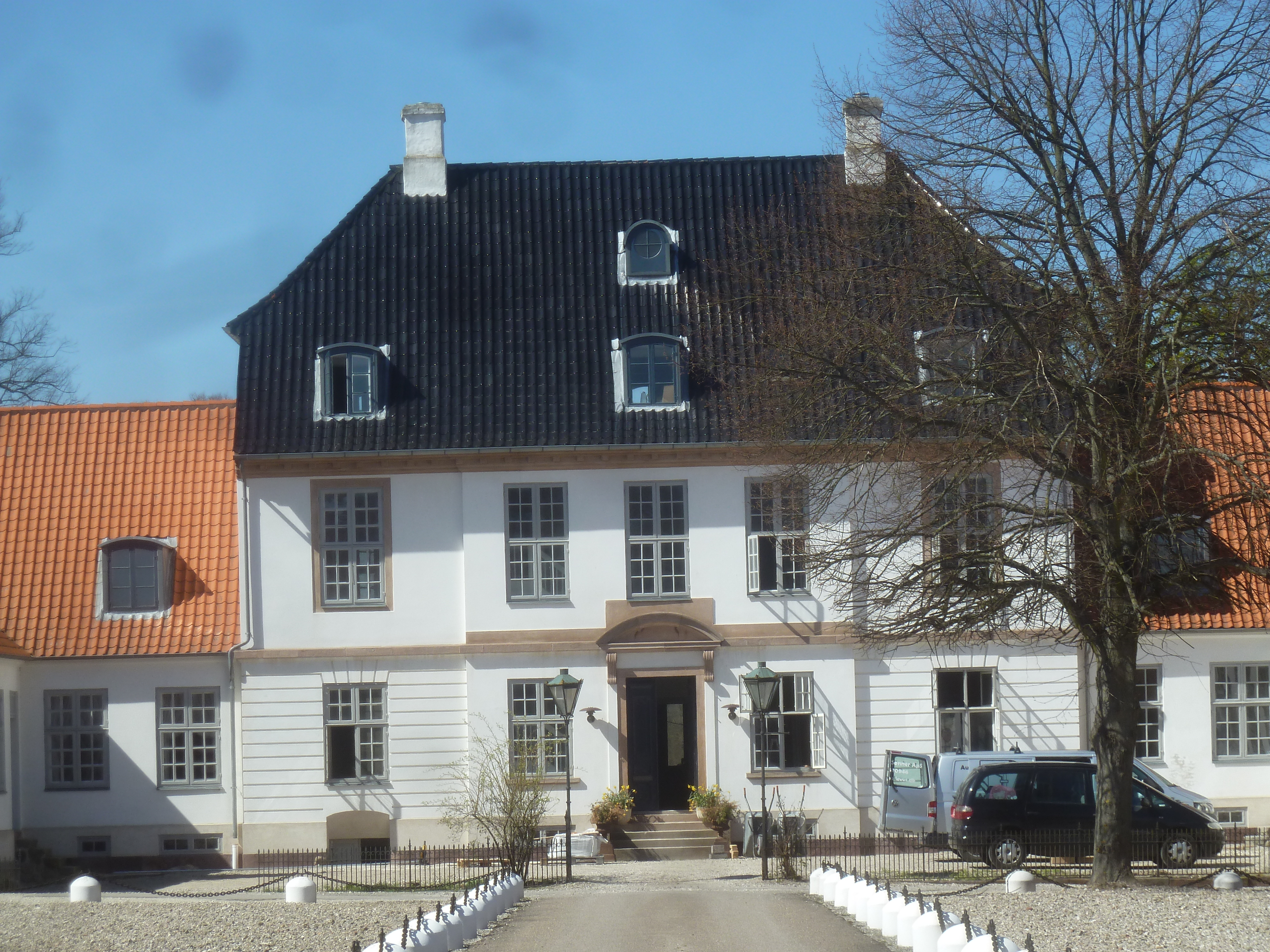
The main wing

The plastered, Neoclassical house consists of a two-storey Corps de logis with a black-glazed tile roof, flanked by a complex of one-storey secondary service wings with hipped, red tile roofs on each side, forming a small Cour d'honneur.

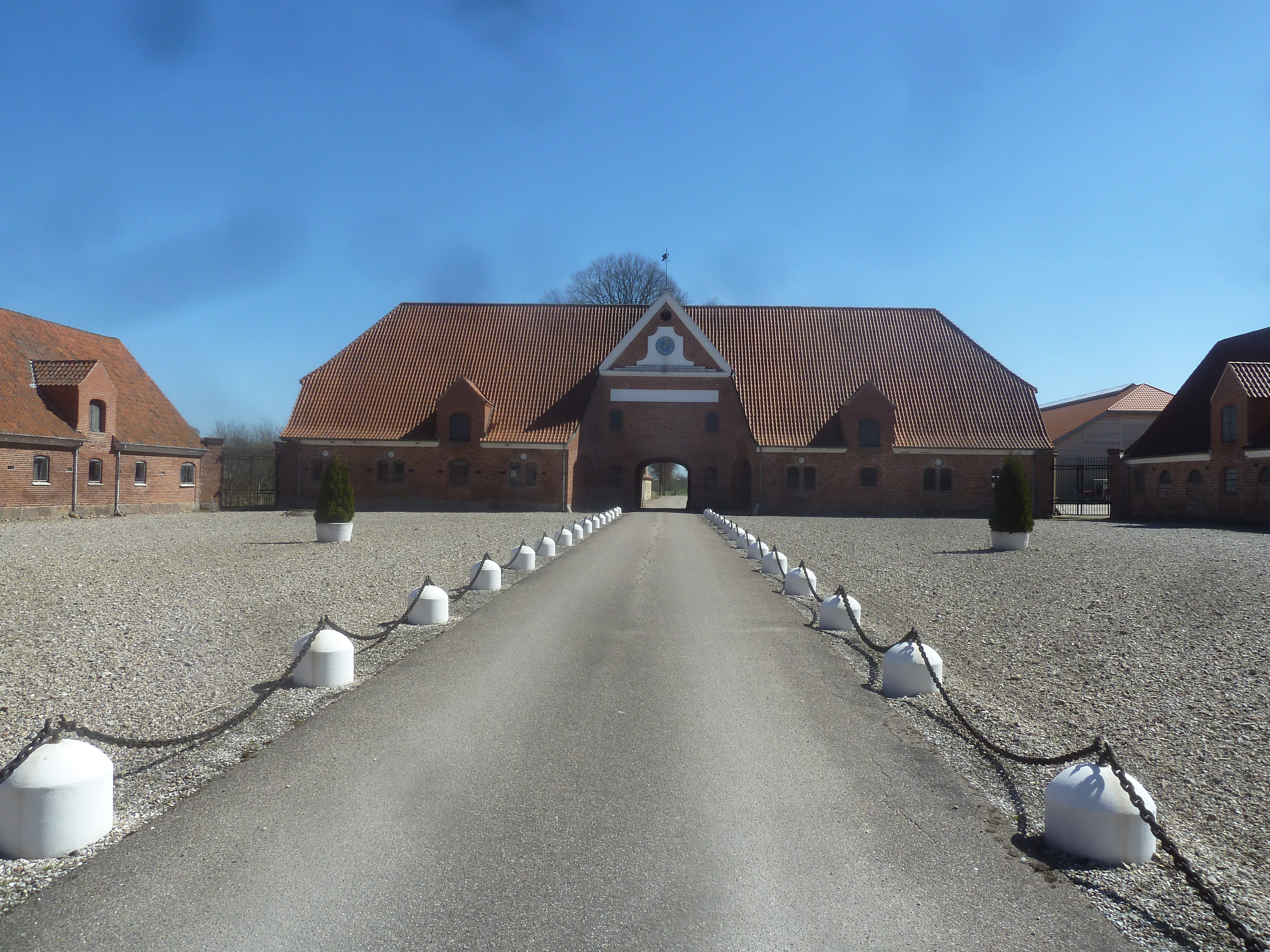
Avlsgården: The large barn with the gateway as seen from the courtyard

The main building is located on the west side of a larger courtyard which is surrounded by farm buildings (Avlsgården) on its three other sides. The farm buildings mostly date from 1866 but integrate remains of the Bjelke's original half-timbered farm buildings. The man building is listed. The farm buildings are not listed. A driveway lined by white-painted boulders runs across this courtyard.

== Surroundings ==
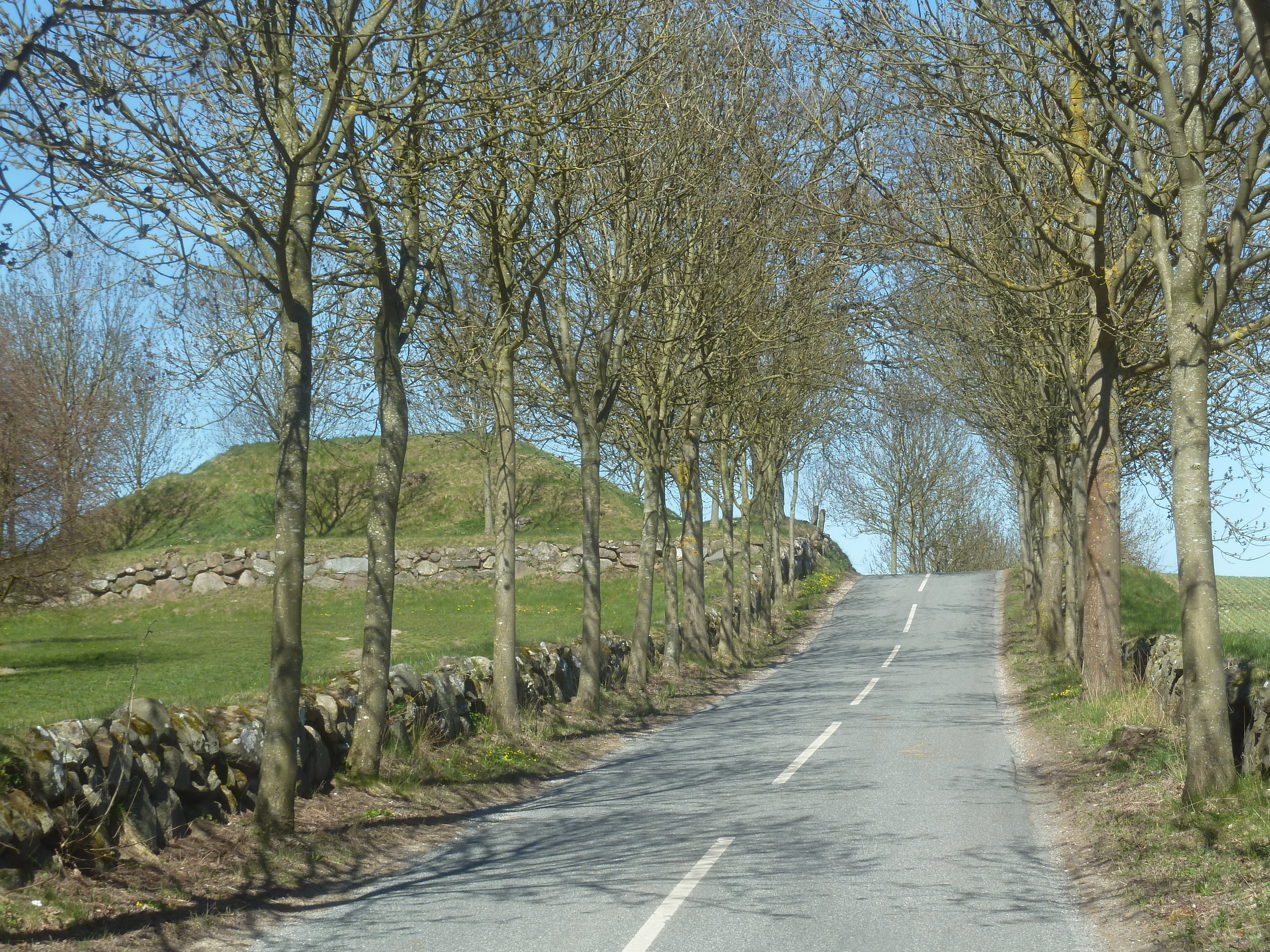
Edelgave Allé and Gyngehøj

The estate covers 300 hectares. Two small woods, Edelgave Skov and Slotsskoven, have a combined area of 27 hectares with the remainder being farmland and orchards. Smørholm, the 700-year-old site of the main castle building, is located immediately to the southeast of the current main building. The ash tree avenue Edelgave Allé and the burial mound Gyngehøj next to it are protected.

== In popular culture ==
Edelgave has been used as a location for the films Tre finder en kro (1955), Et døgn uden løgn (1963), Pigen og greven (1966), Nyhavns glade gutter (1967), Der kom en soldat (1969) Tandlæge på sengekanten (1971) and Fætrene på Torndal (1973).

== List of owners ==
- (1663-1683) Henrik Bjelke
- (1683-1694) Christian Bielke
- (1694-1698) Vibeke Bielke née Juel
- (1698- ) Heinrich Weldingh
- ( -1758) Christian Weldingh
- (1758-1767) Anne Marie Bornemann née Holst
- (1767-1786) Jakob Bornemann
- (1786-1791) Hans Georg Faith
- (1791-1797) Jakob Rosted
- (1797-1806) Christian Lange
- (1806-1830) Friederich Tutein
- (1830-1867) Friederich Wilhelm Tutein
- (1867-1890) Beate Elise Tutein née Hvidt
- (1890-1919) Ellis Tutein
- (1919-1921) Niels Jørgensen
- (1921-1943) Thomas Madsen-Mygdal
- (1943-1956) Marie Madsen-Mygdal
- (1956-1958) J. Th. Oltmann
- (1958-1988) Gudmund Jørgensen
- (1988-1992) Lisa Jørgensen
- (1992- ) Edelgave Gods Aps
