= Friederich Tutein =

Danish merchant, ship-owner and industrialist

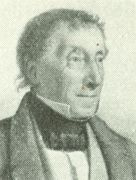
- Born: 9 September 1757; Copenhagen, Denmark
- Died: 6 March 1853 (aged 95); Copenhagen, Denmark
- Occupations: Merchant and industrialist

Johann Friederich Tutein (9 September 1757 – 6 March 1853) was a Danish merchant, ship-owner and industrialist. He managed the family's trading house under the name Fr. Tutein & Co. from 1799. It mainly traded on the Danish colonies with its own fleet of merchant ships. He owned the Tutein House at Vimmelskaftet in Copenhagen, the country house Rosendal in Østerbro and the manor house Edelgave.

== Early life and education ==
Tutein was born into a wealthy merchant family in Copenhagen, the son of Peter Tutein (1726–1799) and Pauline Maria Tutein née Rath (1725–1799). His father had established a thriving trading house in 1747 and was also the owner of a textile factory in a partnership with Reinhard Iselin. Friederich Tutein was educated in his father's company.

== Career ==
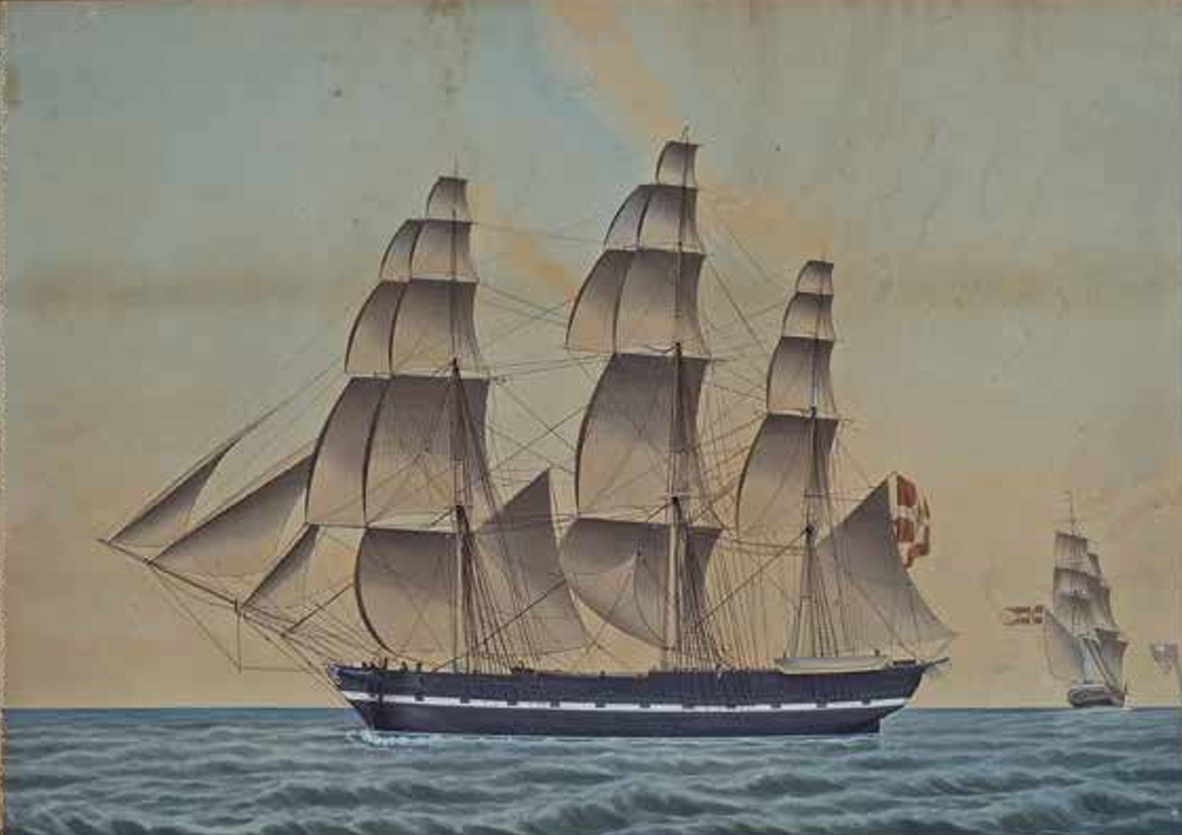
Tutein's frigate Antoinette (built 1791).

On his father's death in 1799, Tutein took on the family's trading house and industrial enterprises under the company name Fr. T. & Co.. He went to both England and Switzerland to study the latest developments in kattun production and was granted a state loan of 40,000 Danish rigsdaler in 1800 for expanding his factory, In 1806 he sold the factory in protest against the Customs Act. He mainly traded colonial goods and was a partner in the St. Croix sugar refinery. His trading house made it through the crisis years of 1807 to 1814.

He was president of Grosserer-Societetet, a wholesaler organization, from 1832 to 1842. He was appointed to etatsråd in 1848.

== Personal life and legacy ==
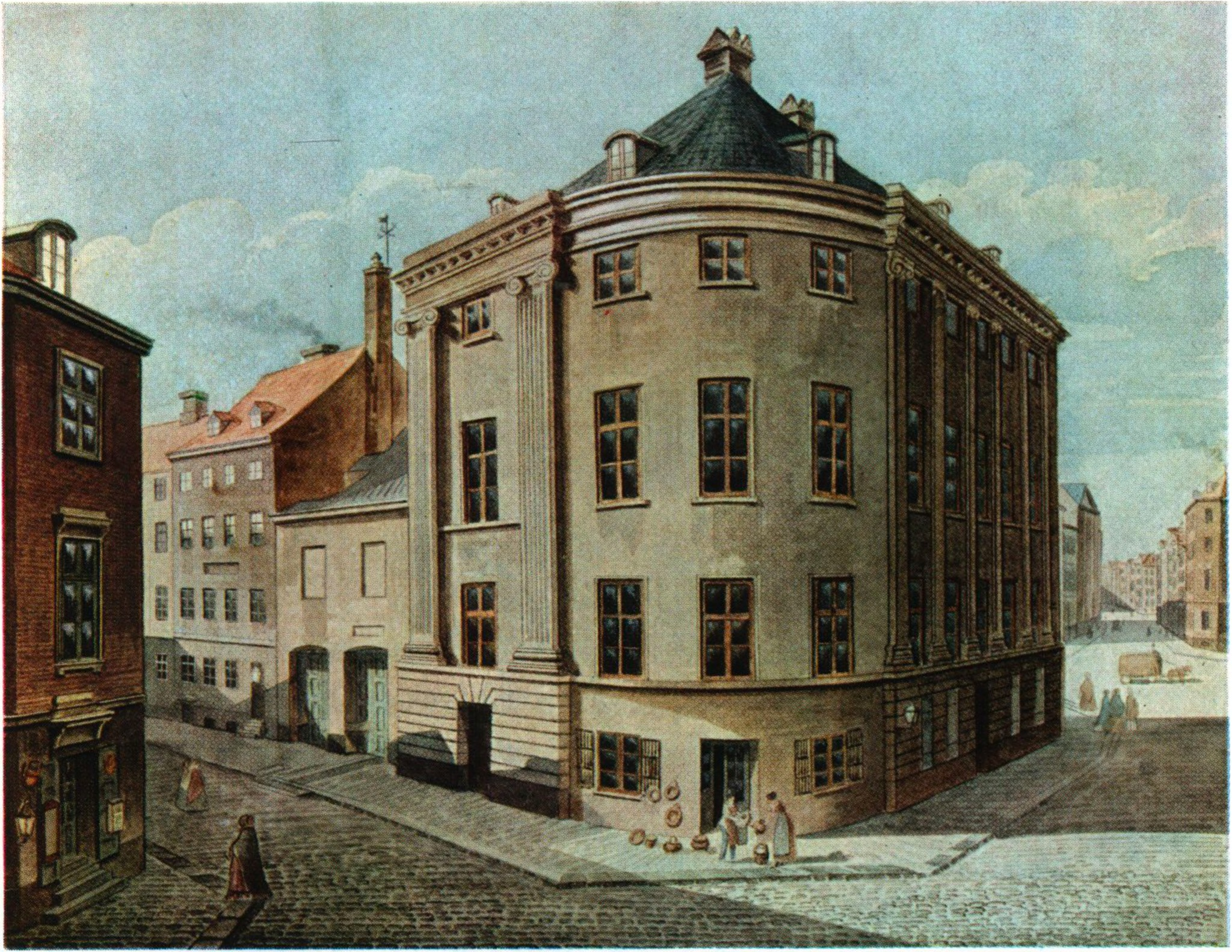
The Tutein House at Vimmelskaftet 47

Tutein married Regina Sophia Wraatz (7 October 1766 – 9 March 1847) on 10 December 1785 in St. Peter's Church in Copenhagen. She was a daughter of Martin Ludwig Wraatz (1732–1806) and Henriette Wilhelmina Becker (1743–1792). Tutein's wife bore him six children of which four survived to adulthood.

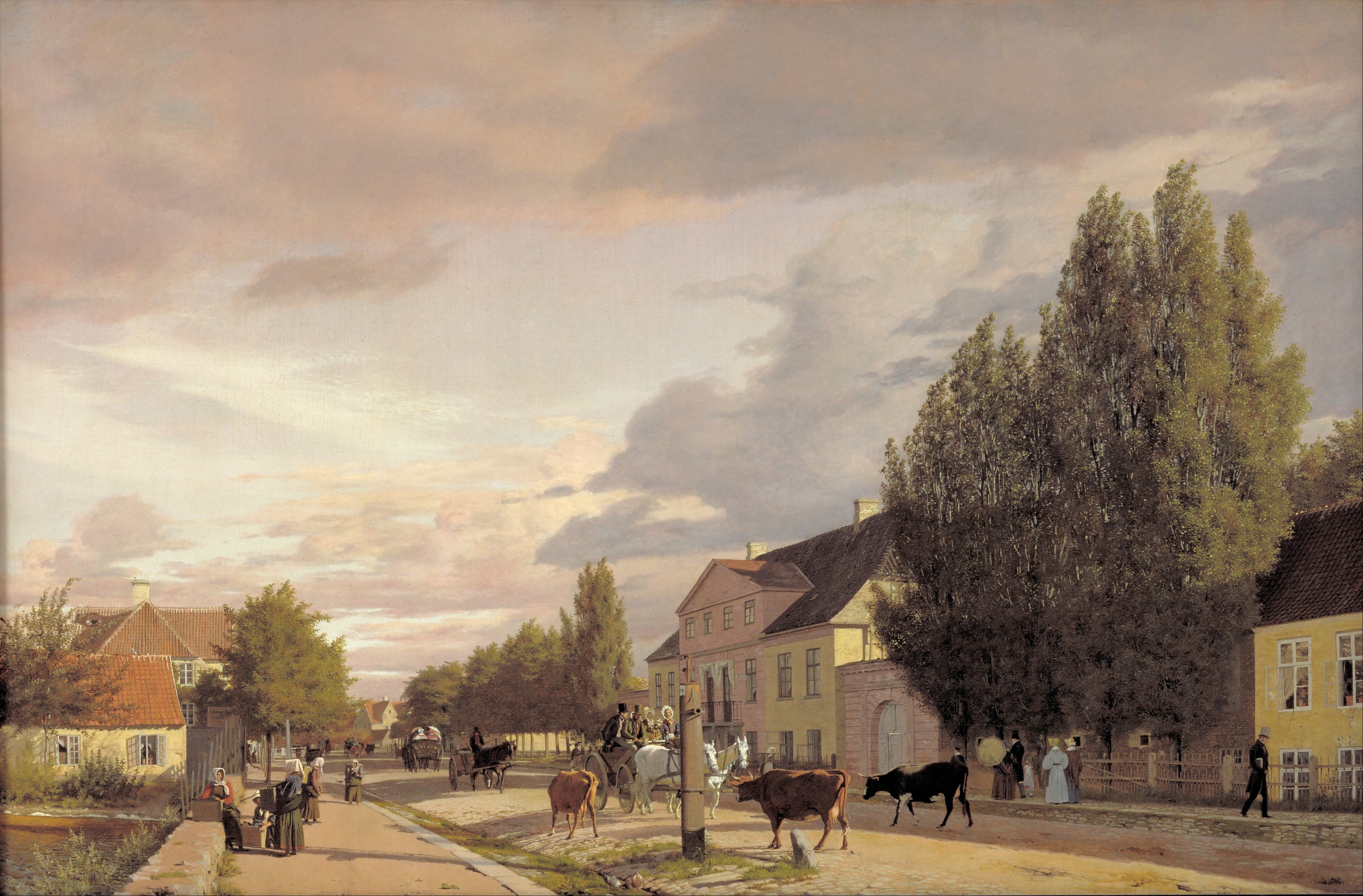
Rosendal seen on a painting by Christen Købke from 1836

Tutein owned a townhouse at the corner of Vimmelskaftet and Badstuestræde. He purchased the country house Rosendal (Rosenvenge) in Østerbro in 1802 and the manor house Edelgave north of Copenhagen in 1809.

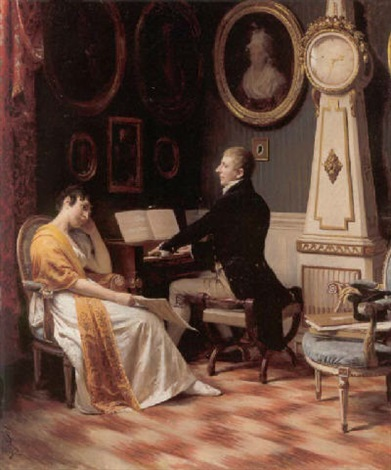
Carl Thomsen: Weyse in the Tutein home

The Tutein family kept a large household and a busy social life. They were fond of music and the composer C. E. F. Weyse often visited their home. Tutein was appointed to Prussian consul general in 1808 but gave up the office on 19 April 1848.

Tutein died on 6 March 1853 and is buried in the chapel of St. Peter's Church in Copenhagen. His eldest son, Friederich Wilhelm Tutein (1791–1867), took over the family company. He also inherited Edelgave. He married the eldest daughter of the wealthy merchant and politician Lauritz Nicolai Hvidt. Another son, Peter Adolph Tutein (1797–1885), acquired Marienborg Manor on Møn in 1821.
