= Waagepetersen House =

Building in Copenhagen

- Waagepetersens Gård
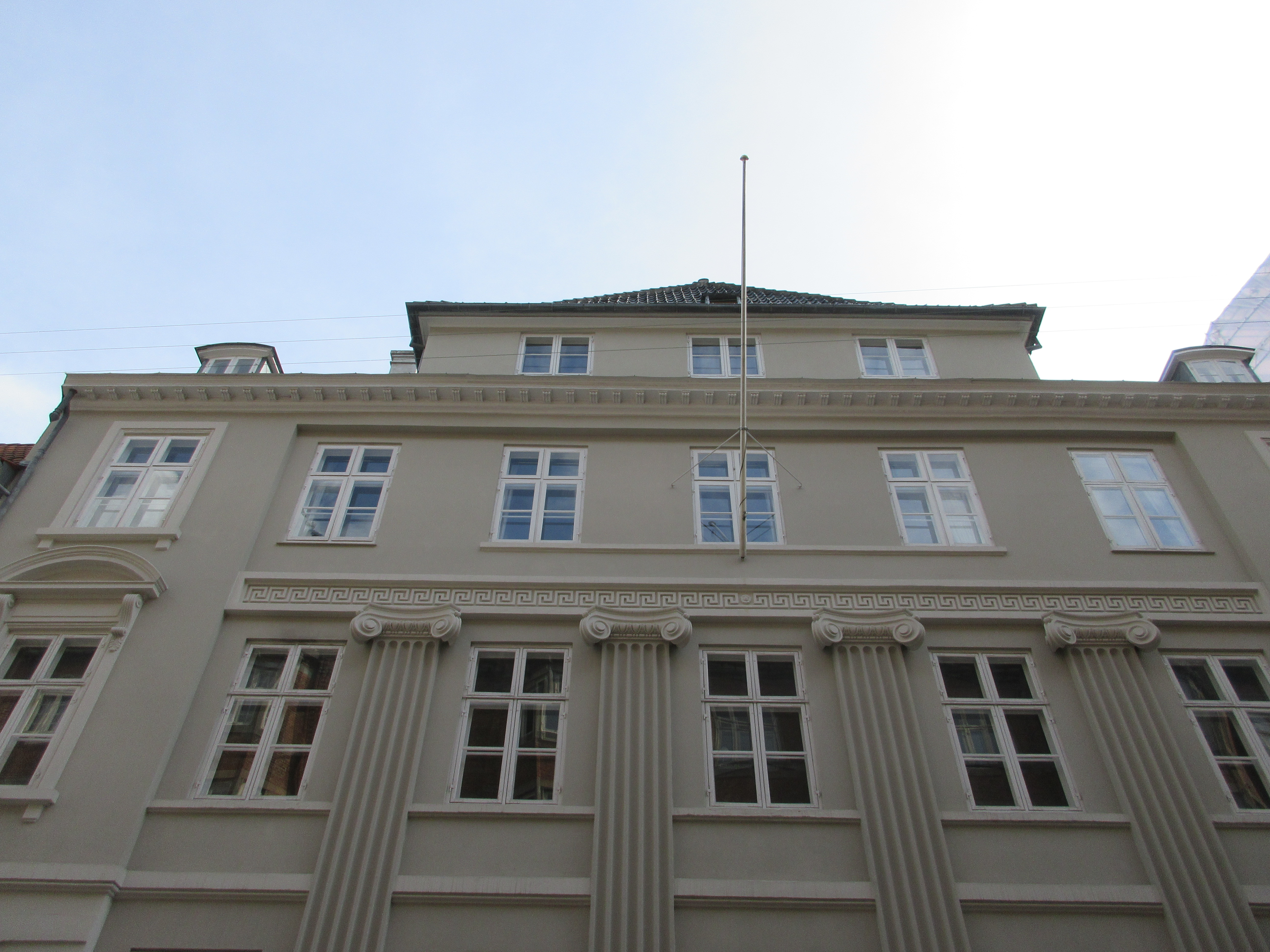
- Interactive map of the Waagepetersen House area

General information
- Architectural style: Johan Martin Quist
- Location: Copenhagen, Denmark
- Coordinates: 55°40′52.14″N 12°35′21.43″E
- Completed: 1793

The Waagepetersen House is a listed Neoclassical town mansion located at Store Strandstræde 18 in Copenhagen, Denmark. The house takes its name after royal wine merchant Christian Waagepetersen who owned it from 1811 to 1840. His home was a meeting place for many of the leading figures of the Danish Golden Age.

== History ==
=== Site history, 1689–1792 ===
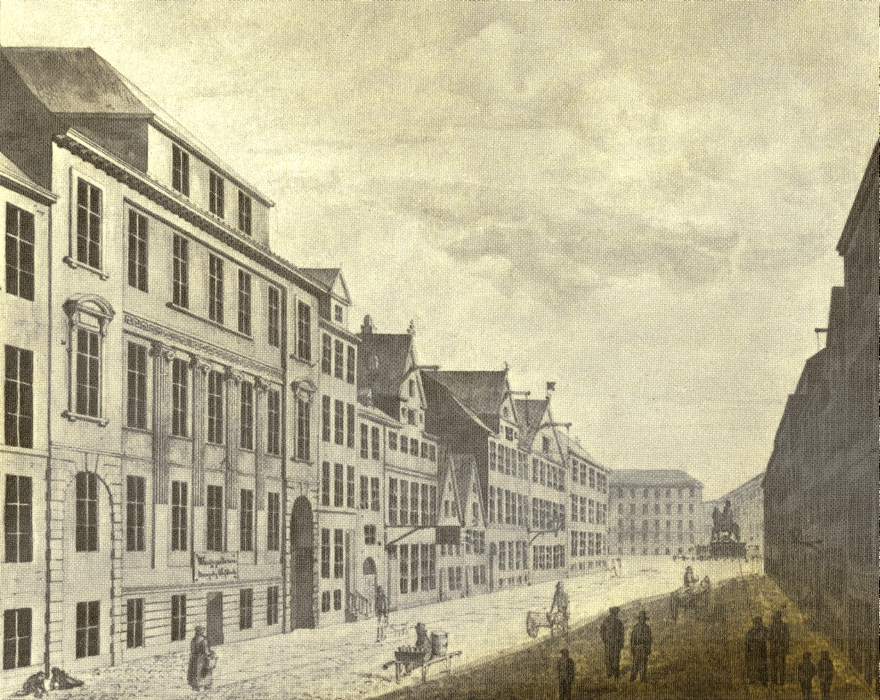
The Waagepetersen House, visible to the far left in c. 1830

The property was listed in Copenhagen's first cadastre from 1689 as No. 50 in St. Ann's East Quarter, owned by distiller Jens Madsen. In the new cadastre of 1756, it was listed as No. 112 in St. Ann's Rast Quarter. It was the site of the rectory of the Lord God of Sabaoth Church (Den Herre Zebaoths Kirke).

=== Quist and the new building ===
The present building on the site was constructed in 1792–1793 by Johan Martin Quist.

In the new cadastre of 1806, Quist's property was listed as No. 79 in St. Ann's East Quarter. The writer and economist Christen Pram was among the residents in 1796. Cai Friedrich, Count Reventlow resided in the building in 1798–1801.

=== The Waagepetersen era ===
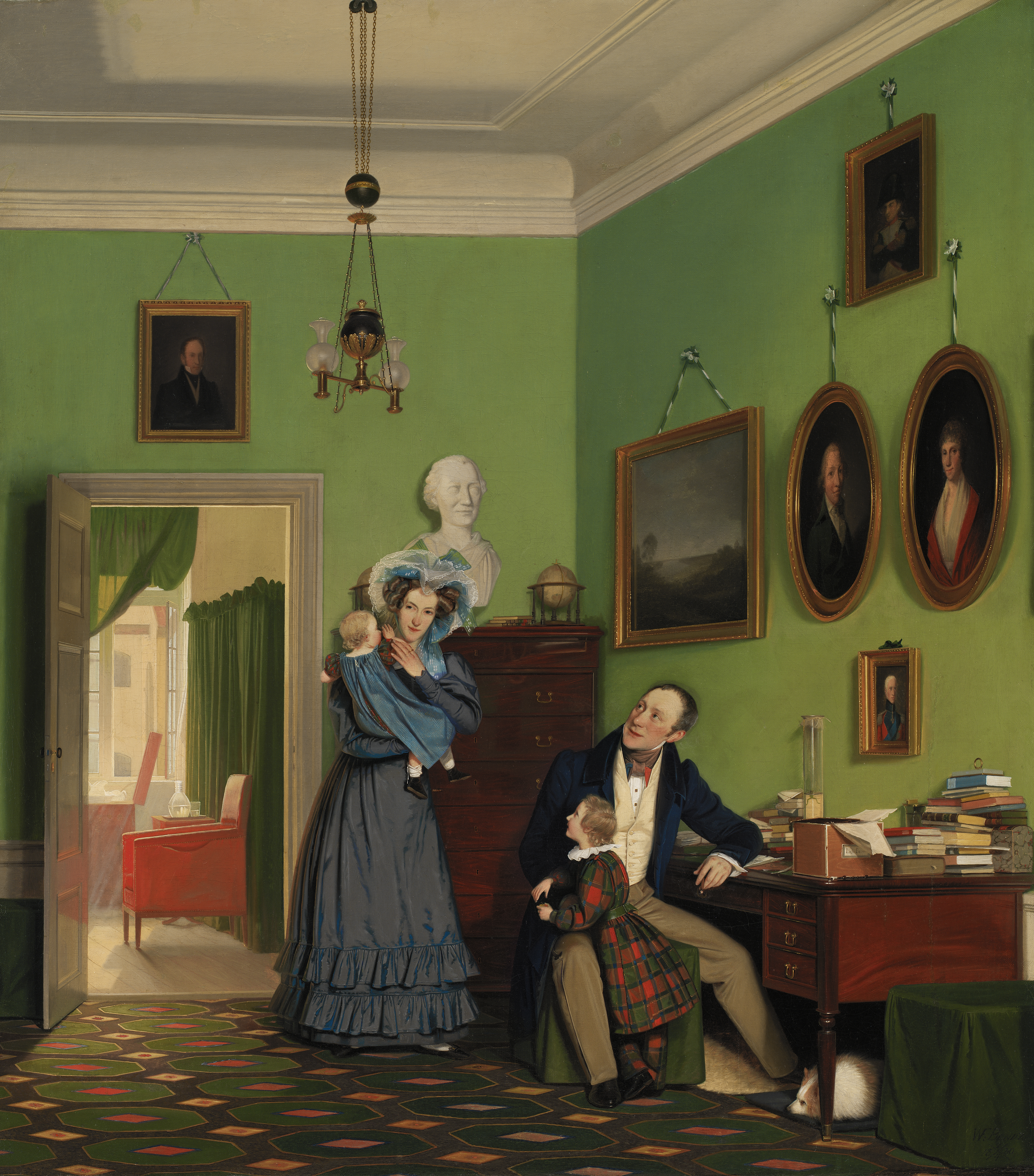
Waagepetersen by his desk in his office in Store Strandstræde

The property was in 1814 acquired by the wine merchant Christian Petersen (later Christian Waagepetersen). He lived there with his large family but also ran his business from the premises. His early tenants during his ownership included the physician Frederik Ludvig Bang who lived in the building from 1812 to 1814, and the composer, conductor and violinist Claus Schall, who lived in the building from 1822 to 1824

Waagepetersen had a passion for the arts and his home in Store Strandstræde was in the 1820s and 1830s a meeting place for many of the leading figures of the Danish Golden Age. He was especially fond of music as witnessed by the fact that he named three of his sons after Haydn, Mozart and Beethoven.

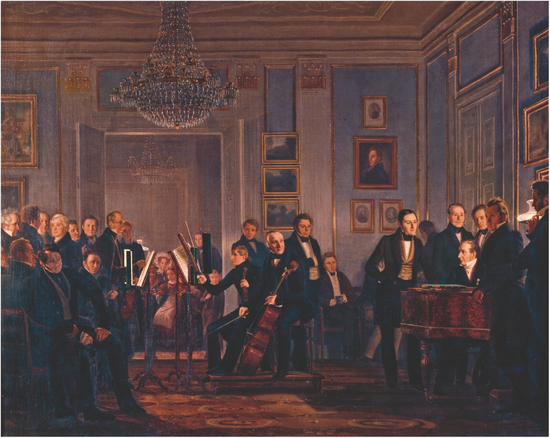
A music soirée painted by Wilhelm Marstrand

The musicians Weyse, Kuhlau and Hartmann were frequent guests and often performed at music soirées. Other guests included the painters Eckersberg and Wilhelm Marstrand.

Christian Waagepetersen died in 1840. The house in Store Strandstræde was then taken over by Mozart Waagepetersen and his wife Charlotte Caroline Mathilde Waagepetersen. Christoffer Schram (1776-) resided as a widower with an unmarried daughter in the apartment on the ground floor. His sister-in-law Henriette Jørgensen, an actress at the Royal Danish Theatre, was also part of the household. Carl Malling (1791-), a senior customs officer, resided with his wife and three unmarried children in the apartment on the second floor.

Mozart Waagepetersen and his wife's only child was Gaston Waagepetersen, an adopted son born outside marriage by Alce Tutein. Mozart Waagepetersen purchased the country house Rosendal in Østerbro. Both properties were sold in 1878. The family then lived at Rosenvængets Side Allé 6 in Østerbro.

=== Later history ===
The company De Forende Papirfabrikker A/S (The United Paper Mills) were based in the building from its foundation in 1889.

The Danish state acquired the building in the early 1980s. In 1984–1986, it was adapted for use as a new home for Nordic Council by the architects Ib and Jørgen Rasmussen. Nordic Council moved out in 2010 after taking over Hotel Royal's former building at Ved Stranden.

== Architecture ==
The building consists of three storeys and a cellar and is built to a somewhat unorthodox design. The three-bay median risalit is decorated with four Ionic order pilasters on the two lower floors. Above the pilasters, between the second and third floor, runs a Greek key frieze. The median risalit is not topped by the usual triangular pediment but instead by a three bay wall dormer with a hip roof.

== Today ==
The building was converted into 32 apartments in 2012, varying in size from 74 to 287 square metres. The two largest apartments were later merged into one 474 square metre apartment by Joe & the Juice-founder Kasper Basse with the assistance of the architects Tom Lundberg og Stig Marvits. It was put on the market at a price of DKK 50 million in 2016.

The building also contains three commercial tenancies. The wine bar Nabiolo has been located in the basement since May 2015.

Christian Lorentz Waagepetersen had a grandson who was also known as Christian Waagepetersen, born in 1850. He migrated to Australia in 1877, landing in Townsville. He was an architect. In partnership with Edward Bevan, he designed an built 'Kardinia'. https://apps.des.qld.gov.au/heritage-register/explorer/detail/?id=600938. For a time, this property was also known as 'Waagepetersen House'. The property is heritiage listed and is located at 11 Victoria Street, North Ward Townsville QLD Australia
