= Jacob Christian Bendz =

Danish medical doctor

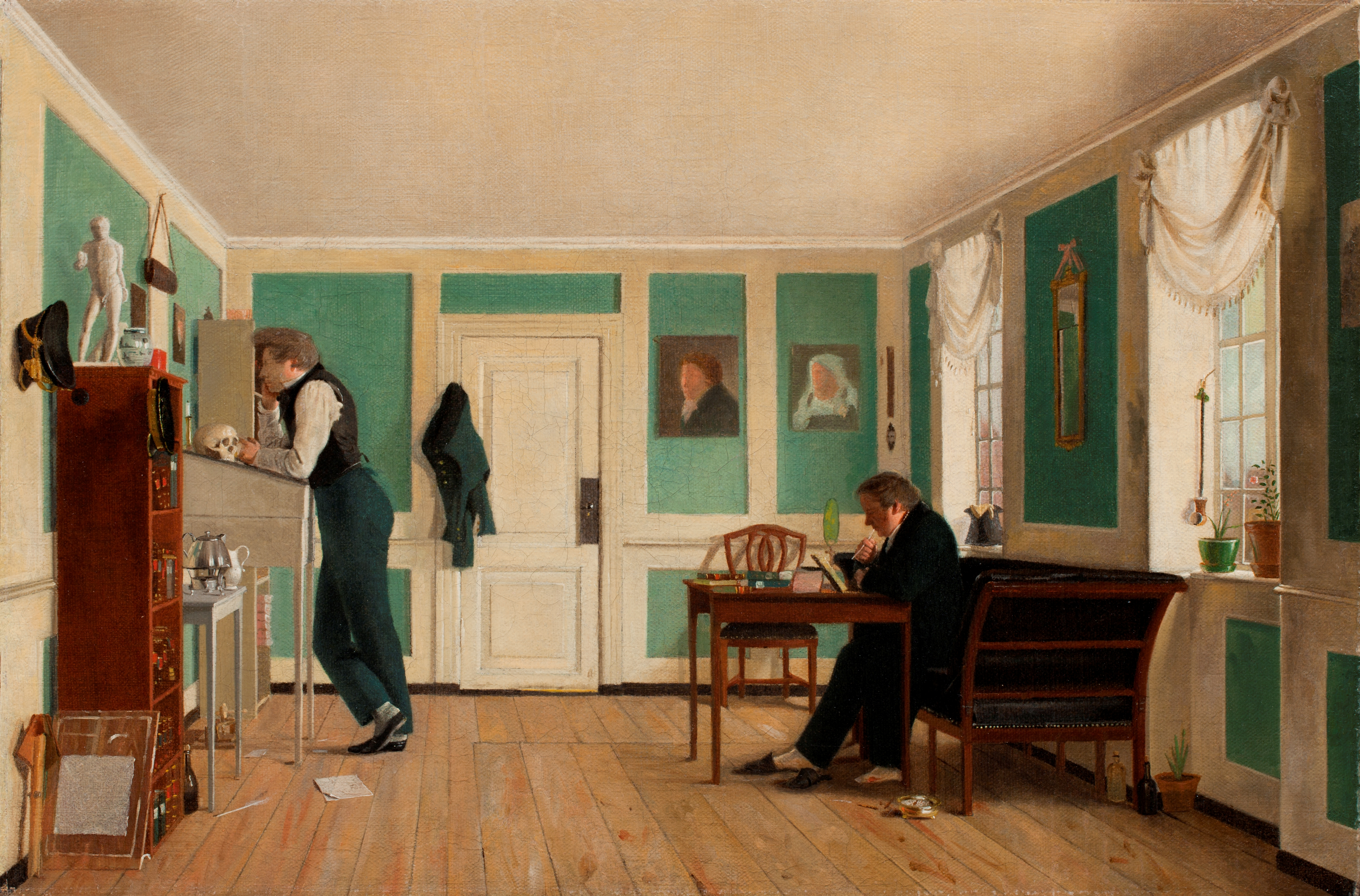
A seated Jacob Christian Bendz and his brother Carl Ludvig Bendz painted by their brother Wilhelm Bendz in an apartment in Amaliegade in Copenhagen

Jacob Christian Bendz (20 March 1802 – 12 September 1858) was a Danish medical doctor, military surgeon and titular professor. He was created a Knight in the Order of the Dannebrog in 1846 and was awarded the Order of Merit in 1849. He was a brother of the painter Wilhelm Bendz and a son-in-law of the wealthy wine merchant Christian Waagepetersen. He also wrote "the first real Tarok book" on the game of Danish Tarok.

== Early life and education ==
Bendz was born in Odense the son of mayor Lauritz Martin Bendz (1751–1824) and his second wife Regine Christence Bang (1772–1854). He graduated from Odense Latin School in 1819 and then moved to Copenhagen where he graduated with distinctions from the Royal Academy of Surgery in 1825, He continued his education abroad in 1827–29.

== Career ==
Bendz was a resident surgeon at the Royal Danish Academy of Surgery in 1829–33 and at Grederick's Hospitel in 1829–32.

On 3 May 1833, he was appointed as Regimental Surgeon of the Guard Hussars at Jægersborg Barracks. He published a number of scientific papers and was from 1833 one of the publishers of Journal for Medicin og Chirurgie. On 27 September 1836, he became a Doctor of Medicine. In 1842, he was appointed as Chief Physician at the Royal Guards on Foot. The title Chief Physician had replaced that of Regiment Surgeon in connection with the merger of the University of Copenhagen's Department of Medicine with the Royal Academy of Surgery. On 4 April 1838, he was appointed as titular professor.

== Tarok ==
Bendz is recorded as the first author of a definitive book on Danish Tarok, an intricate card game related to German Grosstarock that is still played in Denmark today. The book contains good instructions for playing the game in addition to the basic rules. The book is undated but was probably published around 1840.

== Personal life ==
Bendz married Christine Sophie Waage Petersen (8 September 1810 – 10 February 1873) on 17 June 1830 in the Garrison Church in Copenhagen. She was a daughter of the wealthy wine merchant Christian Waagepetersen (1787–1840) and Albertine Emerence Schmidt (1793–1864).

Bendz died on 12 December 1858 and is buried at the Assistens Cemetery in Copenhagen.

== Works ==
c. 1840. Untitled book described as "the first real Tarok book".

== Bibliography ==
- Møller, Hans J. (2011). "Two Centuries of Danish Tarok Rules" (PDF).
