= Mozart Waagepetersen =

Danish wine merchant

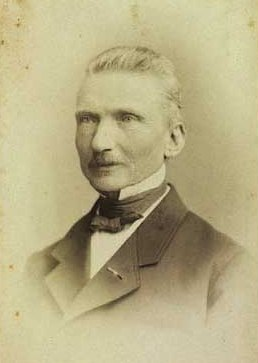
- Born: 22 October 1813; Copenhagen, Denmark
- Died: 25 February 1885 (aged 71); Copenhagen, Denmark
- Occupation: Businessman
- Awards: Knight in the order of the Dannebrog, 1928

Ludvig Lorentz Mozart Waagepetersen (22 October 1813 – 25 February 1885) was a Danish wine merchant. He is now mainly remembered for founding the Rosenvænget quarter of Østerbro in Copenhagen.

== Early life and education ==
Mozart Waagepetersen was born in Copenhagen on 22 October 1813, the son of wine merchant Christian Waagepetersen and Albertine Emmerentse Schmidt (13 October 1793 – 15 November 1864). He was educated in his father's wine company.

== Career ==
Waagepetersen continued the family's wine company upon his father's death in 1840. The company was based in the Waagepetersen House at Store Strandstræde 18, He ceded the company to A. H. Beeken, H. F. Eegholm and F. N. Løvstrøm in 1870 but Eegholm and Løvstrøm left the company again in 1880 and 1885. The company was at some point moved to new premises at Store Kongensgade 79.

== Personal life ==
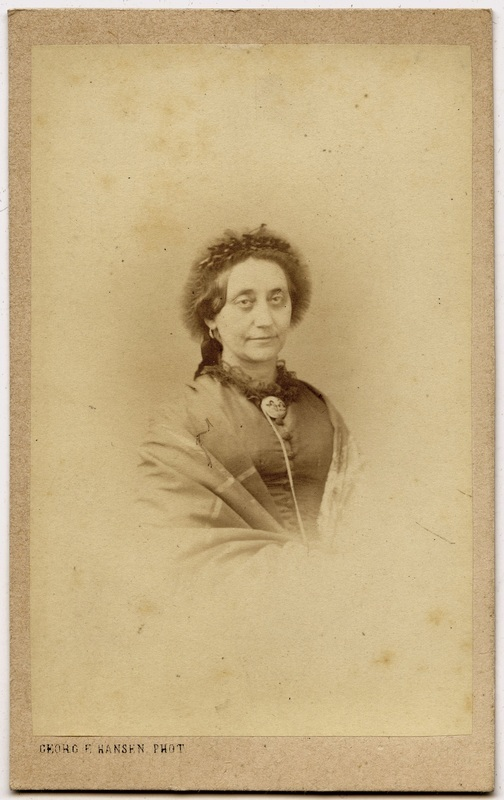
Charlotte Caroline Mathilde Schram

Mozart Waagepetersen married Charlotte Caroline Mathilde Schram. She was a daughter of director of the Widow's Pension Fund (Enkekassen) Gerhard Christopher Schram (1776-1847) and Anna Johanne Christiane Jørgensen (1802).

Mozart and Mathilde Waagepetersen had no children but adopted the illegitimate son of Alce Tutein, the daughter of landowner and politician Peter Adolph Tutein, who had become pregnant with painter Johannes Müller. Müller was painting a miniature portrait of Alice Tutein as a gift to her fiancé, Alexander Brun. The boy was given the name Gaston Waagepetersen.

== Rosendal and the Rosenvænget Quarter ==
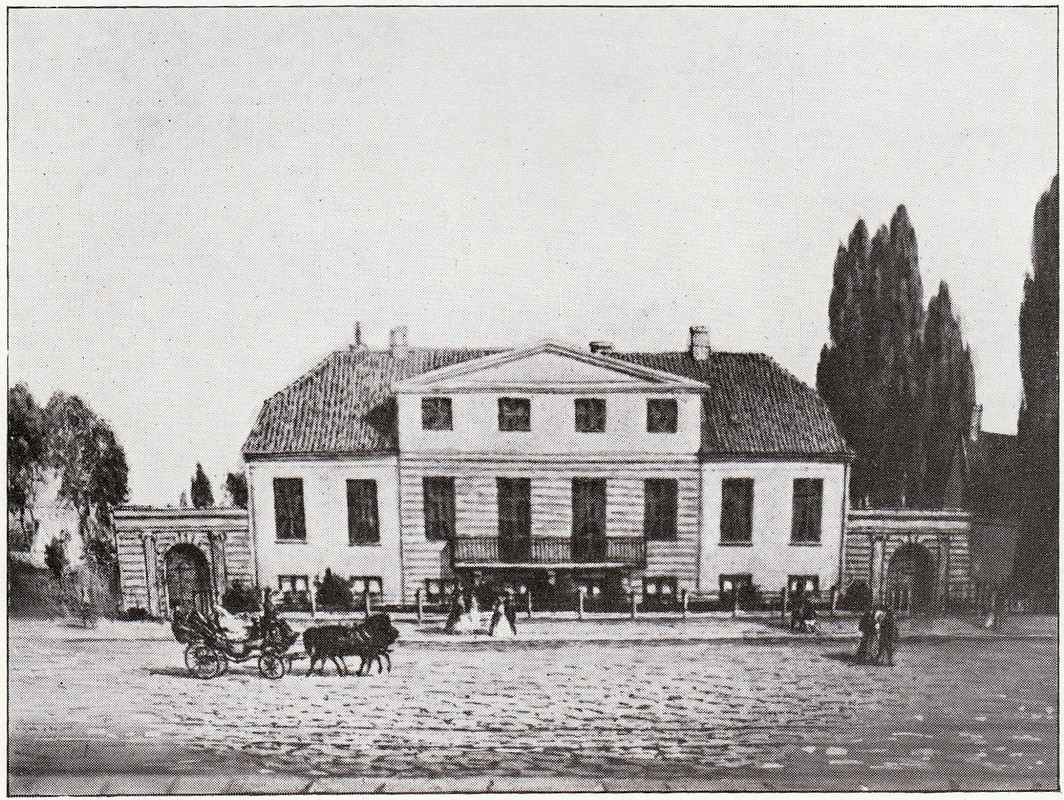
Rosendal seen on a proposal for a decoration on a vase for the silver wedding of Mozart and Mathilde Waagepetersen, 1867

Waagepetersen bought the country house Rosendal in Østerbro from Friederich Tutein's heirs in 1857.

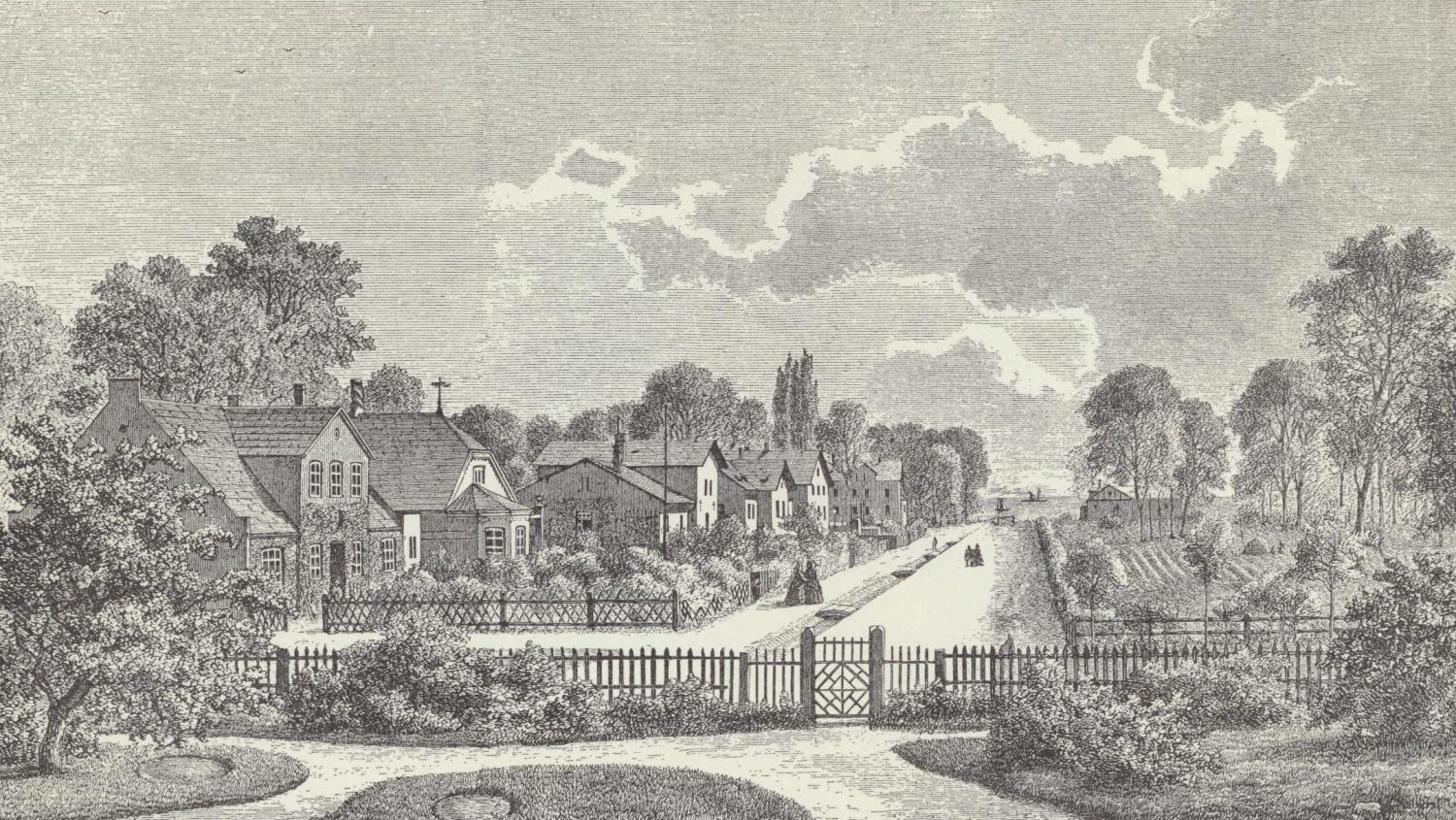
Rosenvaenget, 1863

Waagepetersen sold the land of the Rosendal estate off in lots for redevelopment with single-family detached homes. The buyers were mostly businessmen, well-to-do master craftsmen and high-ranking officers and civil servants but also cultural figures such as the painters P.C. Skovgaard and Wilhelm Marstrand, the composer Emil Hartmann and the actress Johanne Luise Heiberg. . The land was sold in the period 1857–1873. Waagepetersen used Rosendal as a summer retreat until his death, The building was demolished in 1890 and replaced by an apartment building.
