= Andresen & Schmidt =

Danish trading firm

Andresen & Schmidt, also frequently referred to as Schmidt & Andresen, was a Danish trading firm based in Copenhagen, Denmark.

== History ==
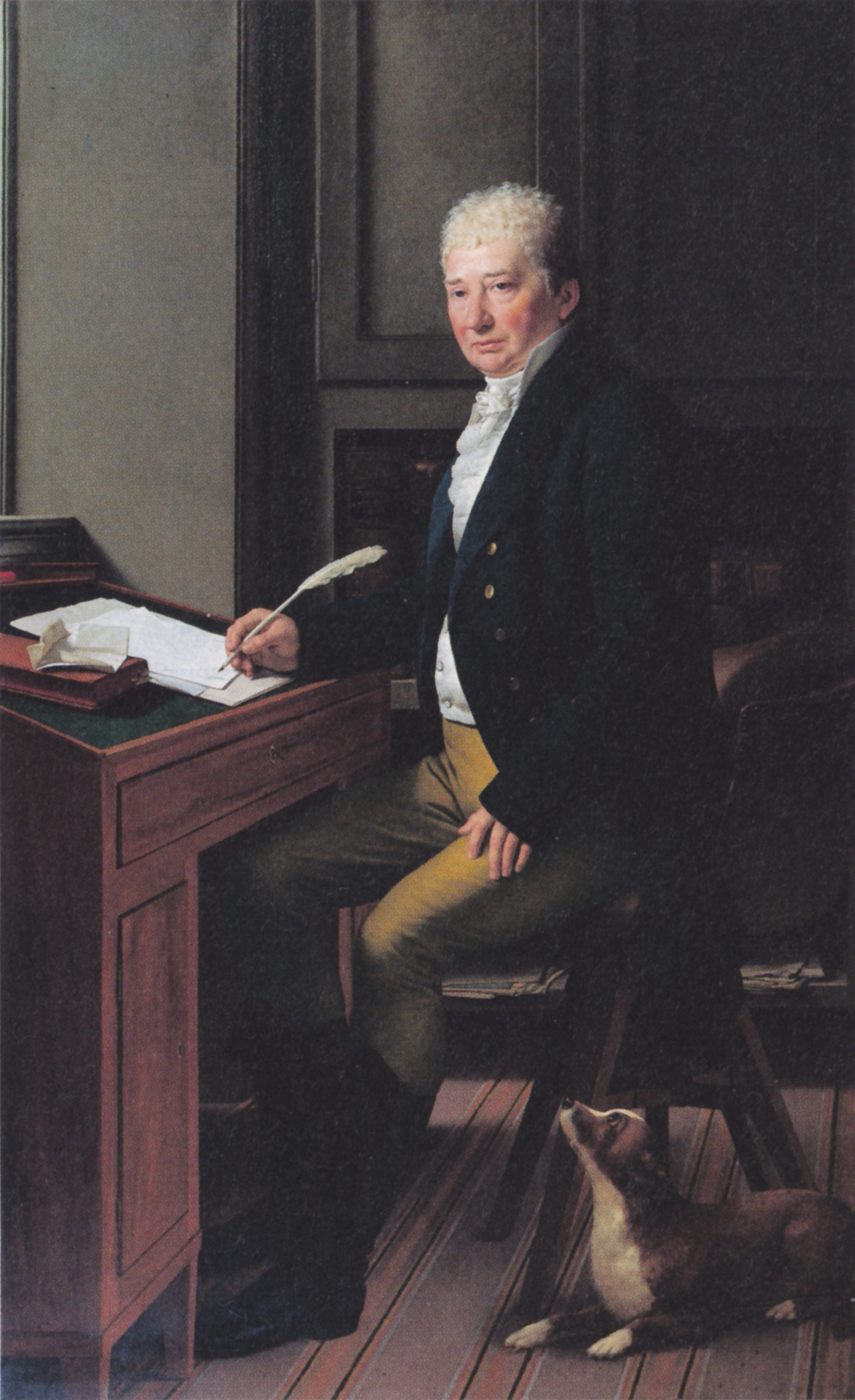
Albrecht Ludvig Schmidt painted by C. W. Eckersberg.

Albrecht Ludvig Schmidt (1754–1821) was born in Kiel. He later settled in Copenhagen as a wholesale merchant. In 1693, he established Andresen & Schmidt in partnership with the Danish India-based merchant Andresen. The firm was based on his property at the corner of Ved Stranden and Holmens Kanal.

The company is also referred to as Rederiet Schmidt og Andresen. The proprietors were the East Indian merchants Andresen and Albrecht Ludvig Schmidt, Copenhagen, (1754-1821), born in Kiel. (C. W. Eckersberg painted the latter's portrait in 1818). The firm's fleet of merchant ships sailed in the India and Canton trade.

Andresen & Schmidt made investments in privateering vessels during the Gunboat War.

Albrecht Ludvig Schmidt was married to Friederiche Christiane Restorff, daughter of Rasmus Pedersen Restorff and Marie Anne Sørensdatter Gørding. Her sister Birthe Emerence Restorff was married to Jørgen Thomsen Bech, another leading wholesale merchant and ship-owner of the day. Albrecht Ludvig Schmidt's eldest son Siegfried Victor Schmidt was married to Conradine Wilhelmine Schmidt, daughter of the wine merchant Lorentz Petersen. His younger brother Albrecht Jørgen Schmidt was married to Rasmine Elisabeth Kirketerp, daughter of the prominent wholesale merchant Rasmus Kirketerp. Their sister Albertine Emmerentze Schidt was married to the wine merchant Christian Waagepetersen.
