= Albrecht Ludwig Schmidt =

Danish merchant and ship-owner

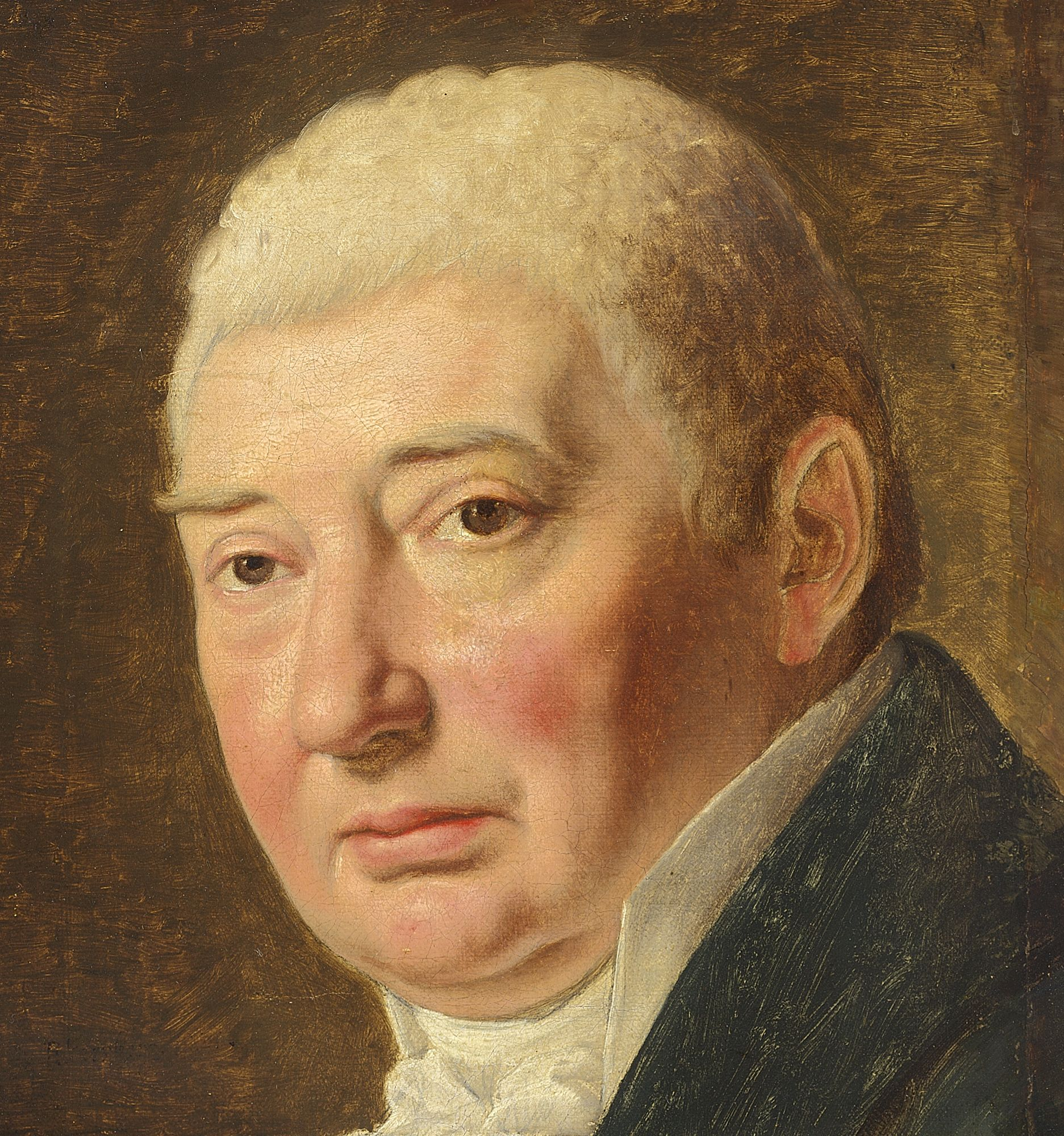
Study for C. W. Eckersberg's portrait of Albrecht Ludvig Schmidt

Albrecht Ludwig Schmidt (22 November 1754 – 2 October 1821) was a Danish merchant and ship-owner. A co-founder of Schmidt & Andresen, he made a fortune on trade in the Far East and Danish West Indies. Two monumental portrait paintings painted from 1818 by C. W. Eckersberg of Schmidt and his wife are now owned by the Hirschsprung Collection.

== Early life and education ==
Schmidt was born on 22 November 1754 in Kiel, Schleswig-Holstein. His father was Albert Anton Schmidt. Little is known about his early life.

== Career ==
Albrecht Ludwig Schmidt and his business partner, the merchant Andresen began trading together in the late 1780s. The company had its fleet of merchant ships and traded both in the Danish West Indies and the Far East. They owned a building with an associated warehouse at the corner of Ved Stranden and Holmens Kanal.

== Personal life and legacy ==
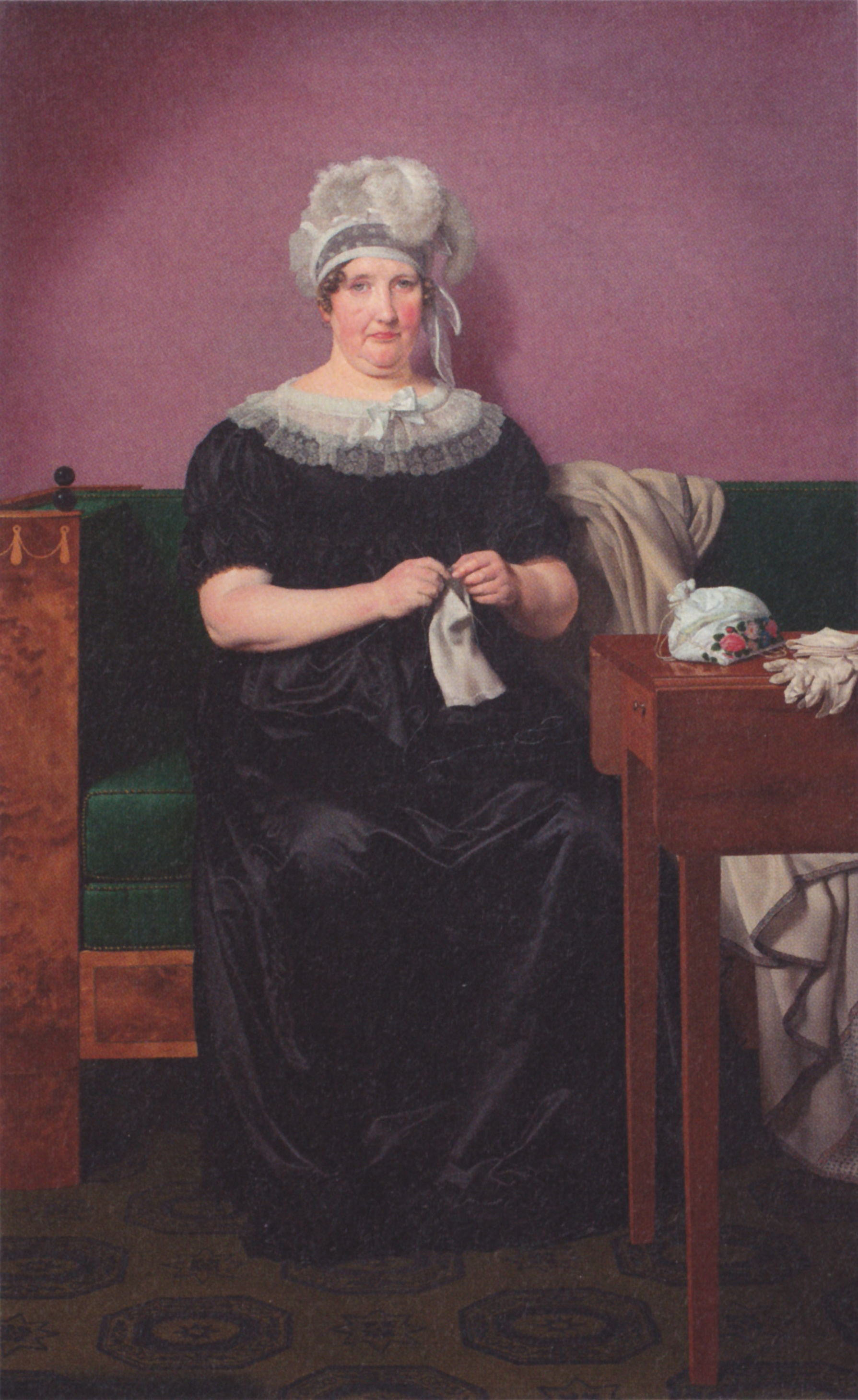
Anne C. W. Eckersberg: Frederikke Christiane Schmidt, 1818

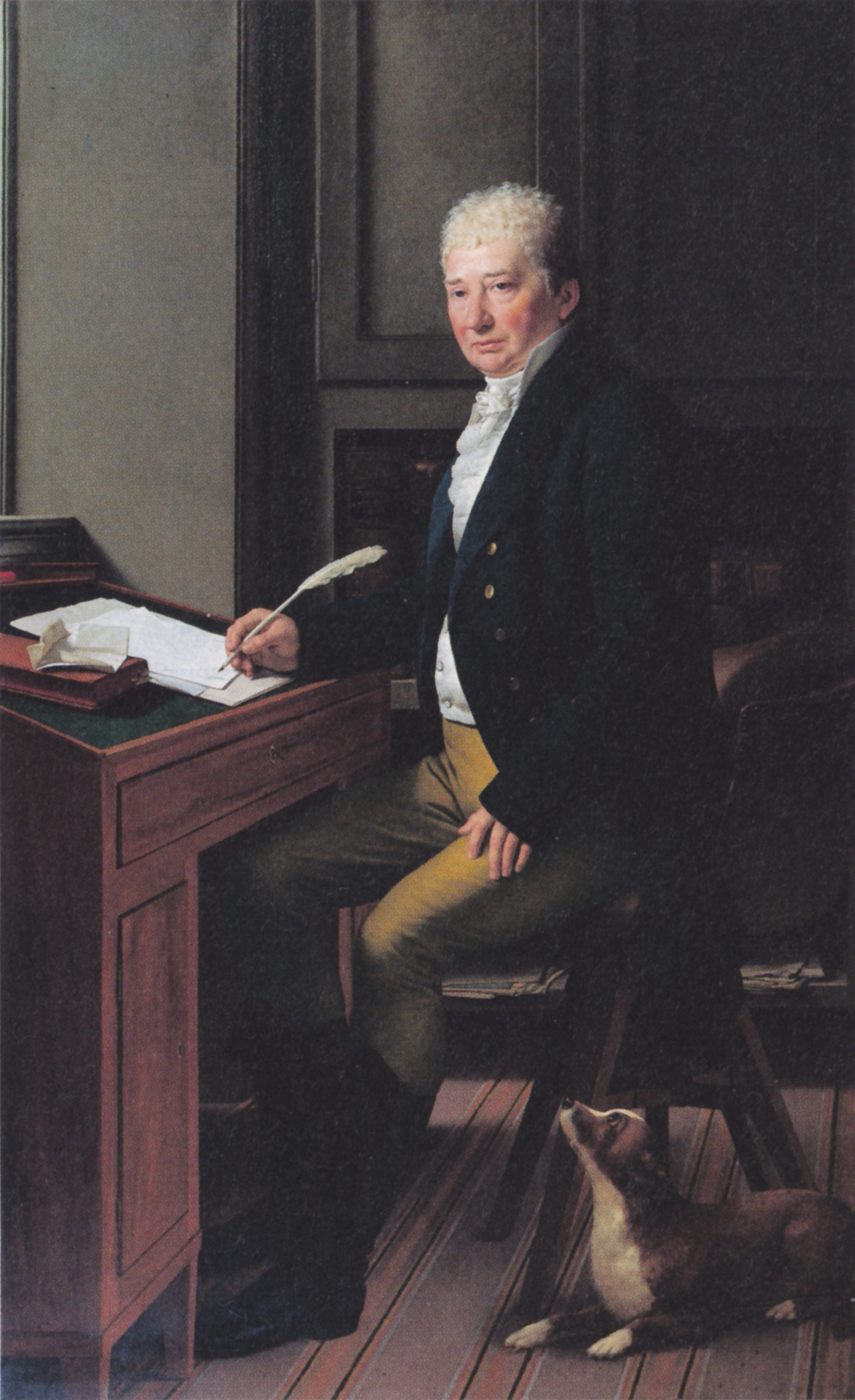
C. W. Eckersberg: Albrecht Ludvig Schmidt, 1818

Schmidt married Friederiche Christiane Restorff, a daughter of Rasmus Pedersen Restorff and Marie Anne Sørensdatter Gørding. They had five children: Siegfried Victor Schmidt; Albrecht Jørgen Schmidt; Jens Peter Schmidt; Erasmine Frederike Schmidt and Albertine Emmerentze Waagepetersen. The younger of the two daughters, Albertine, married the wealthy wine merchant Christian Waagepetersen,

Schmidt lived with his family in the apartment on the second floor of the building at Ved Stranden 2. The building was constructed after the Copenhagen Fire of 1795 but the architect is not known. He had prior to that lived in Nyhavn. He purchased the country house Fortungården (Albertinelyst) at Kongens Lyngby in 1804.

He commissioned two life-size portraits of himself and his wife from C. W. Eckersberg in 1818. Schmidt is depicted sitting by his desk while his wife is sitting on a sofa knitting. Schmidt died on 2 October 1821. He is buried in the Cemetery of Holmen.

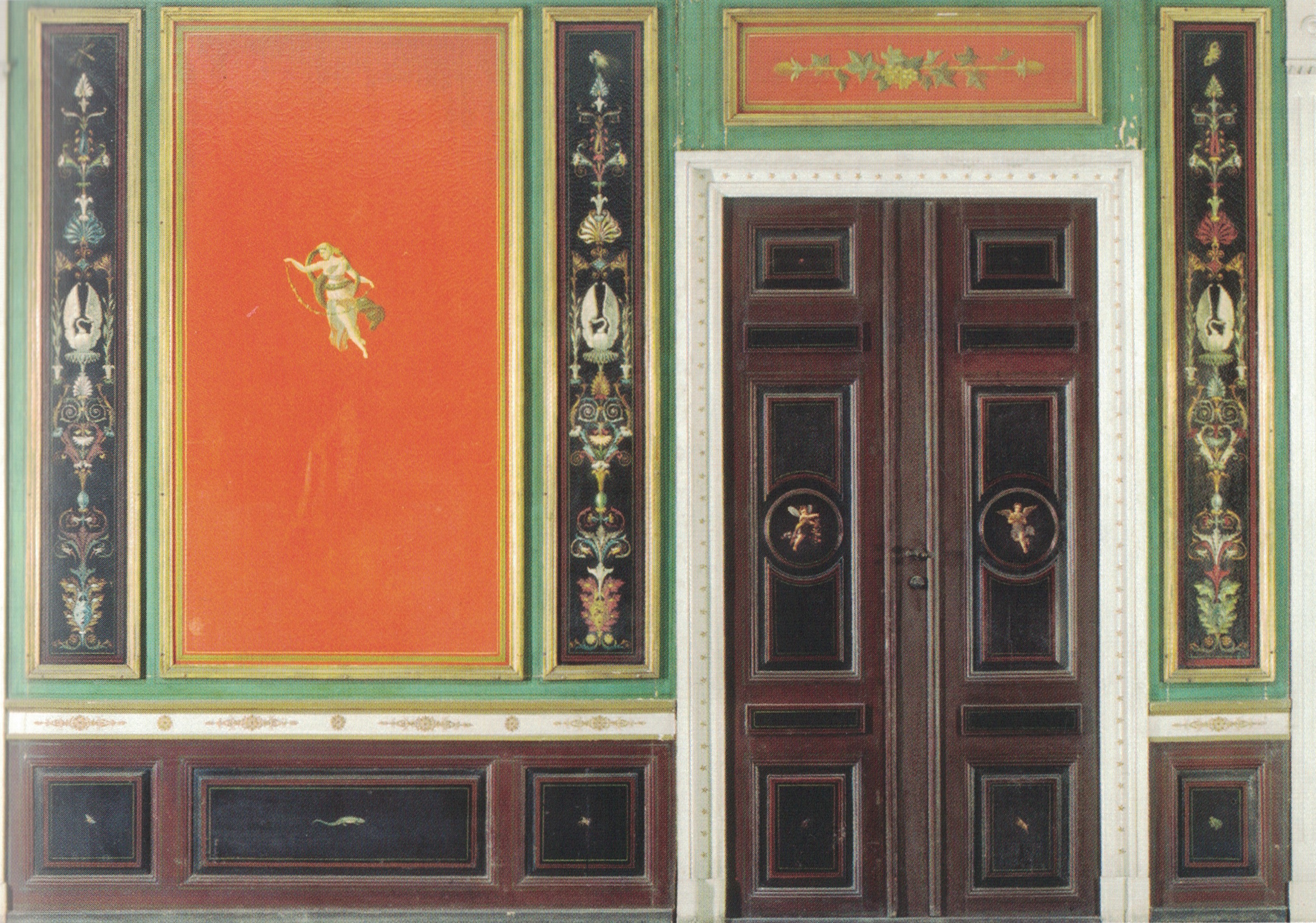
Detail of the Pompeian interior from Schmidt's apartment at Ved Stranden 2

The two Eckersberg portraits were for the first time exhibited together in an exhibition arranged by Kunstforeningen in 1895. They were 1900 acquired by the Hirschsprung Collection.

A Pompeian interior from Schmidt's former apartment at Ved Stranden 2 was donated by Håndværkerbanken to the Danish Arts & Crafts Museum in 1916. The building was demolished in 1936 to make way for a new head office for the insurance company Nordisk Gjenforsikrings Selskab

The Hirschsprung Collection arranged an exhibition about Schmidt, his company, and the two portraits entitled Borgerskabets triumf in 2012.
