= Louis Aumont =

Danish painter (1805–1879)

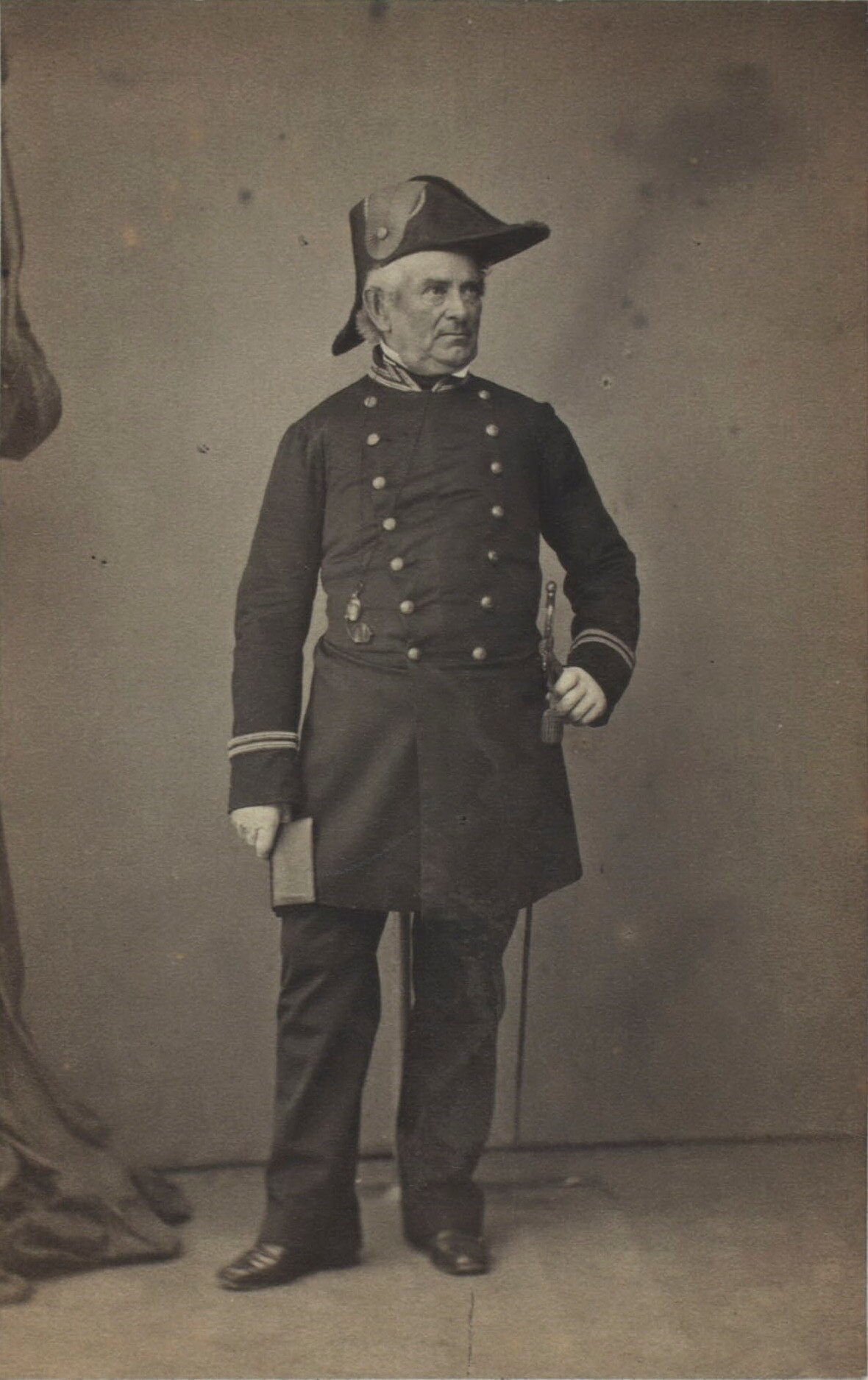
- Aymont in 1865
- Born: Herman Albert Gude Wedel; 7 January 1805; Copenhagen, Denmark
- Died: 6 May 1879 (aged 74); Copenhagen, Denmark
- Education: Royal Danish Academy of Art
- Known for: Painting

Louis Auguste François Aumont (7 January 1805 – 6 May 1879) was a French-Danish portrait painter.

== Early life and education ==
Aumont was born on 7 January 1805 in Copenhagen, the son of Jean Pierre Marie Aumont (c. 1775–1845) and Anna Elisabeth de Jenty (1783–1852). His father was assistant bookkeeper in the Bank of Denmark and a major in the Civil Guard (Borgervæbningen). Aumont was admitted to the Royal Danish Academy of Fine Arts in 1820 where he studied portrait painting under Hans Hansen and C. W. Eckersberg. He won the small silver medal in 1824 and the large silver medal in 1826. He unsuccessfully tried to obtain a stipend from the academy to continue his education in Paris but his plans were instead realized with economic support from Prince Christian Frederik and A. W. Moltke. In Paris, he worked in Antoine-Jean Gros' studio. The works that he sent home were well received, for instance by Niels Laurits Høyen, so that he could finally obtain the approval from the academy needed to get a government stipend.

== Career ==
After his return to Copenhagen in 1829, he immediately made a name for himself as a celebrated portrait painter and received a number of commissions from the royal court.

In 1832, he unsuccessfully tried to become an associated member (agreeret) of the art academy with a painting of colonel-lieutenant Hagedorn's children. The next year, when he made another attempt, this time with a portrait of Johanne Louise Heibergs, he was again rejected. He responded by selling his paintings and moving to Hamburg in 1834 (citizenship in 1839). The Great Fire of Hamburg in 1842 made him return to Copenhagen. It was a struggle for him to make ends meet and in 1847 he travelled to the Danish West Indies. In 1853, he was employed as intendent and ship's cook on the naval brig Mercurius. He remained in the service of the navy in other ships until 1865. In 1858–59, he was back in Paris. In 1824–44, Aumont exhibited a total of 82 paintings at Charlottenborg. In 1827, he exhibited a portrait painting at the salon in Paris.

Aumont participated in the Second Schleswig War and was wounded in the Battle of Sankelmark. He died in Copenhagen on 6 May 1879.

== Personal life ==
On 6 October 1832, Aumont married Vilhelmine Bernhardine Paasch (1812–1894). She was the daughter of second lieutenant Joachim Barner Paasch (ca. 1790–1827) and Helene Marie Paust (c. 1793–1851). Louis Aumont was the father of flower painter Horace Aumont and the paternal uncle of theatre historian Arthur Aynont.

== Selected works ==
- Arveprinsesse Caroline (1830, Rosenborg)
- Princess Wilhelmine (1831, Rosenborg)
- Queen Caroline Amalie (1830, Rosenborg)
- Christian VIII (1831, Rosenborg)
- Christian VIII (1834, Frederiksborg Museum)
- Konferensrådinde Frølich (1837, Danish National Gallery)
- Marquis de Massilian (Montpellier)
- August Bournonville (Royal Danish Theatre)
- Professor Claus Schall og hustru (Teatermuseet)
- H. E. Freund (Klintholm)
- The Artist's Wife (formerly Johan Hansens's art collection)

== Gallery ==
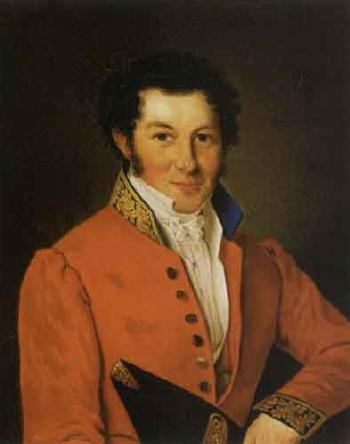
Johannes Eilert Steenfeldt

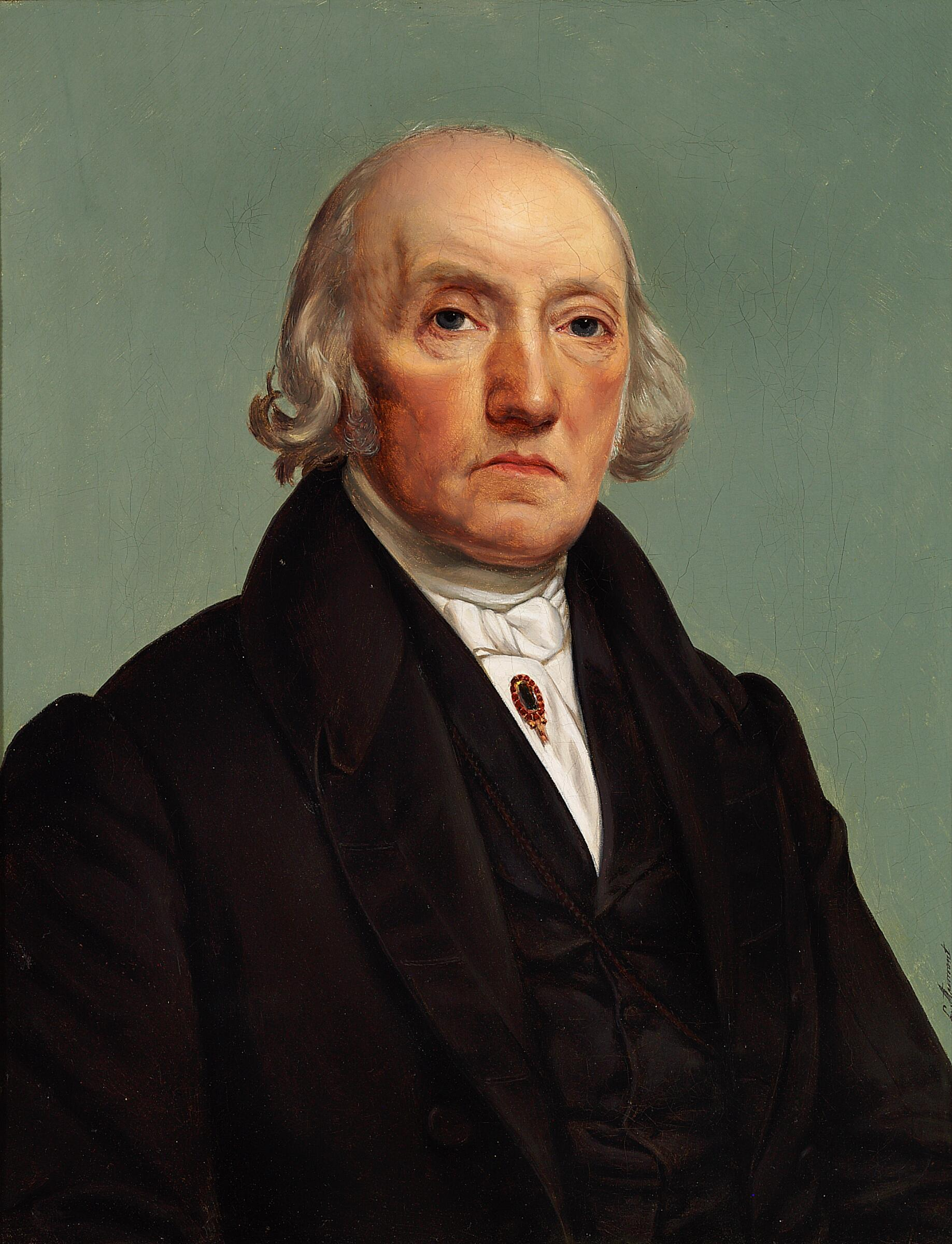
Antoine Bournonville

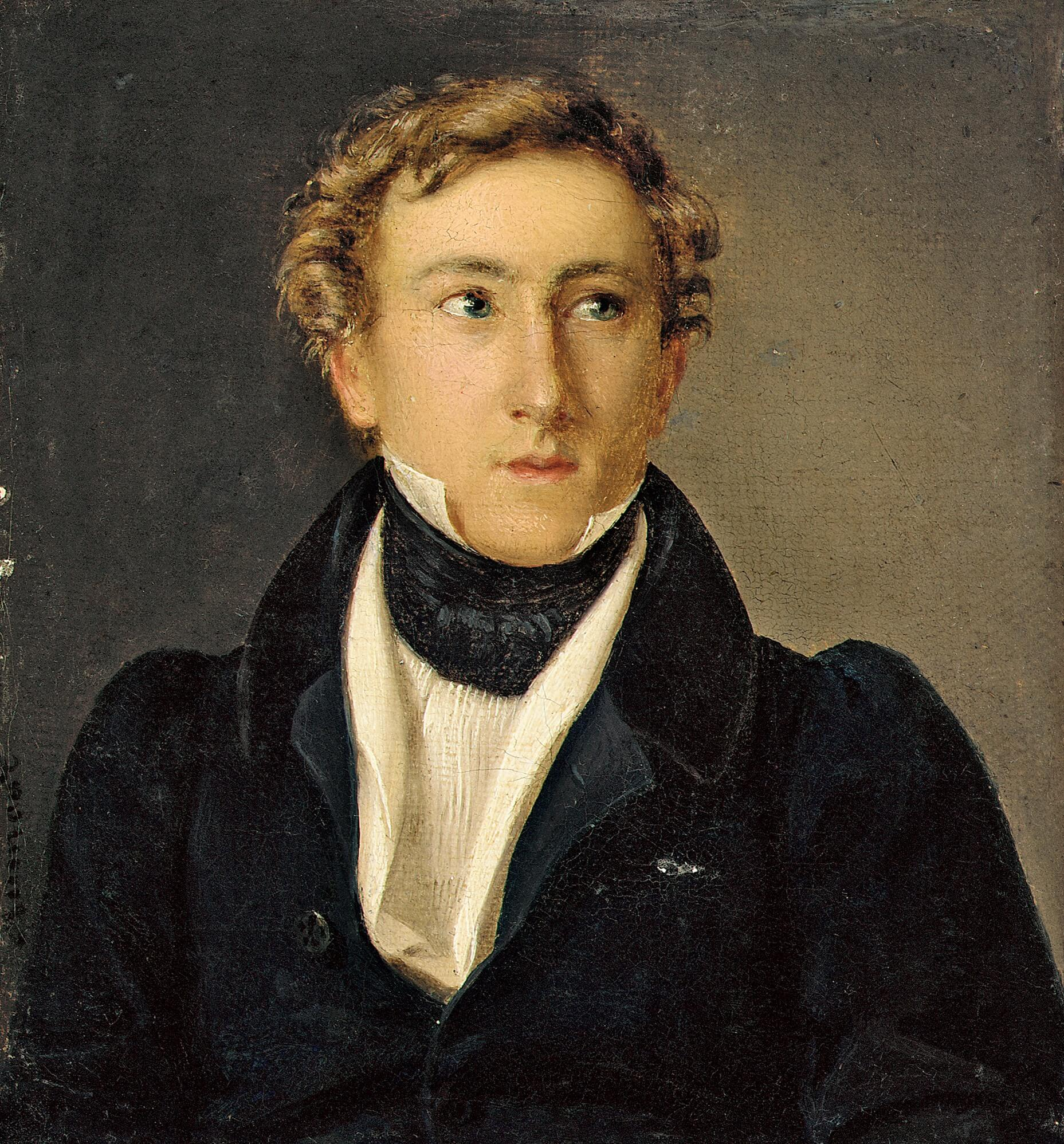
August Bournonville (1828)

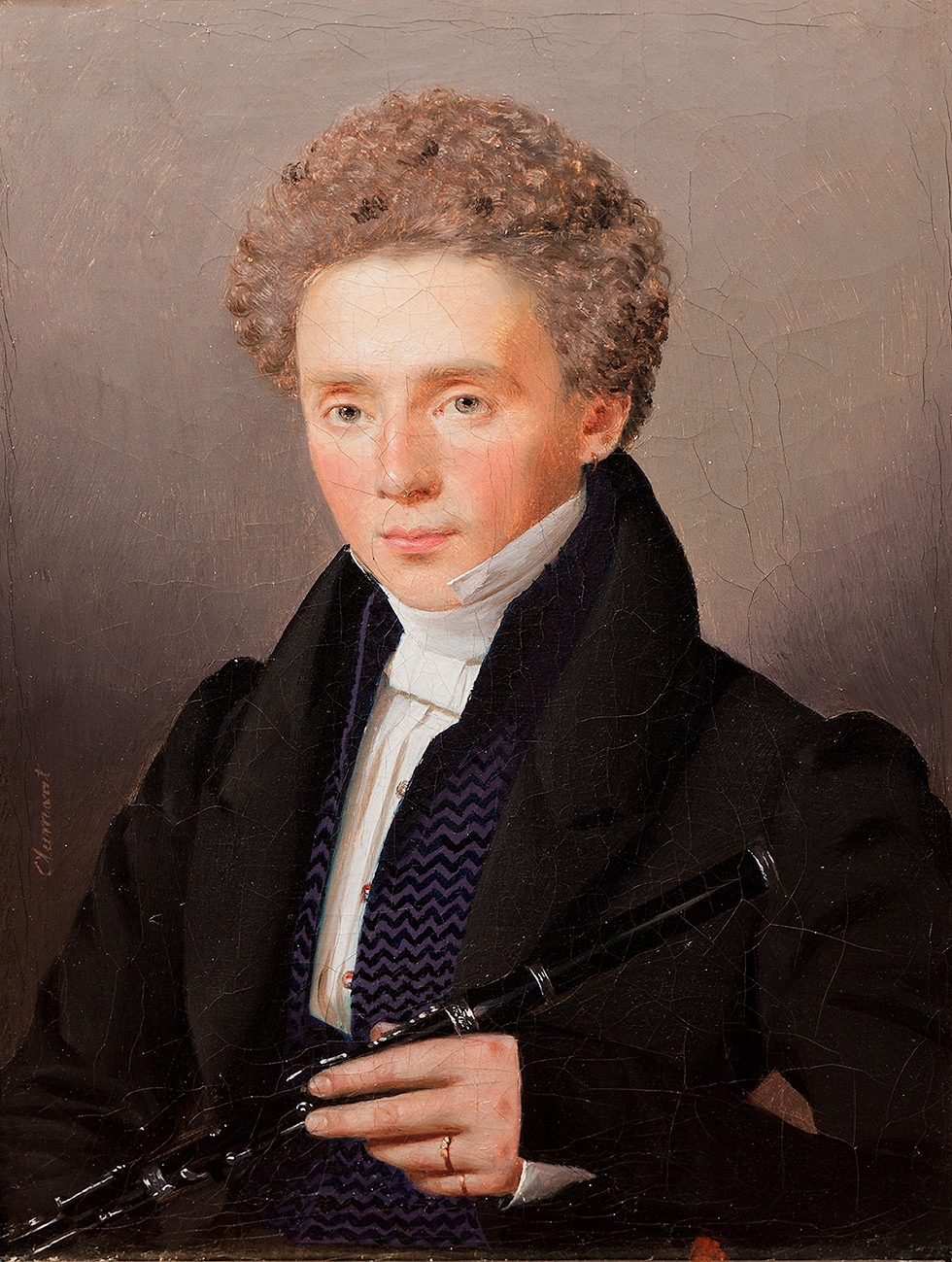
Niels Petersen

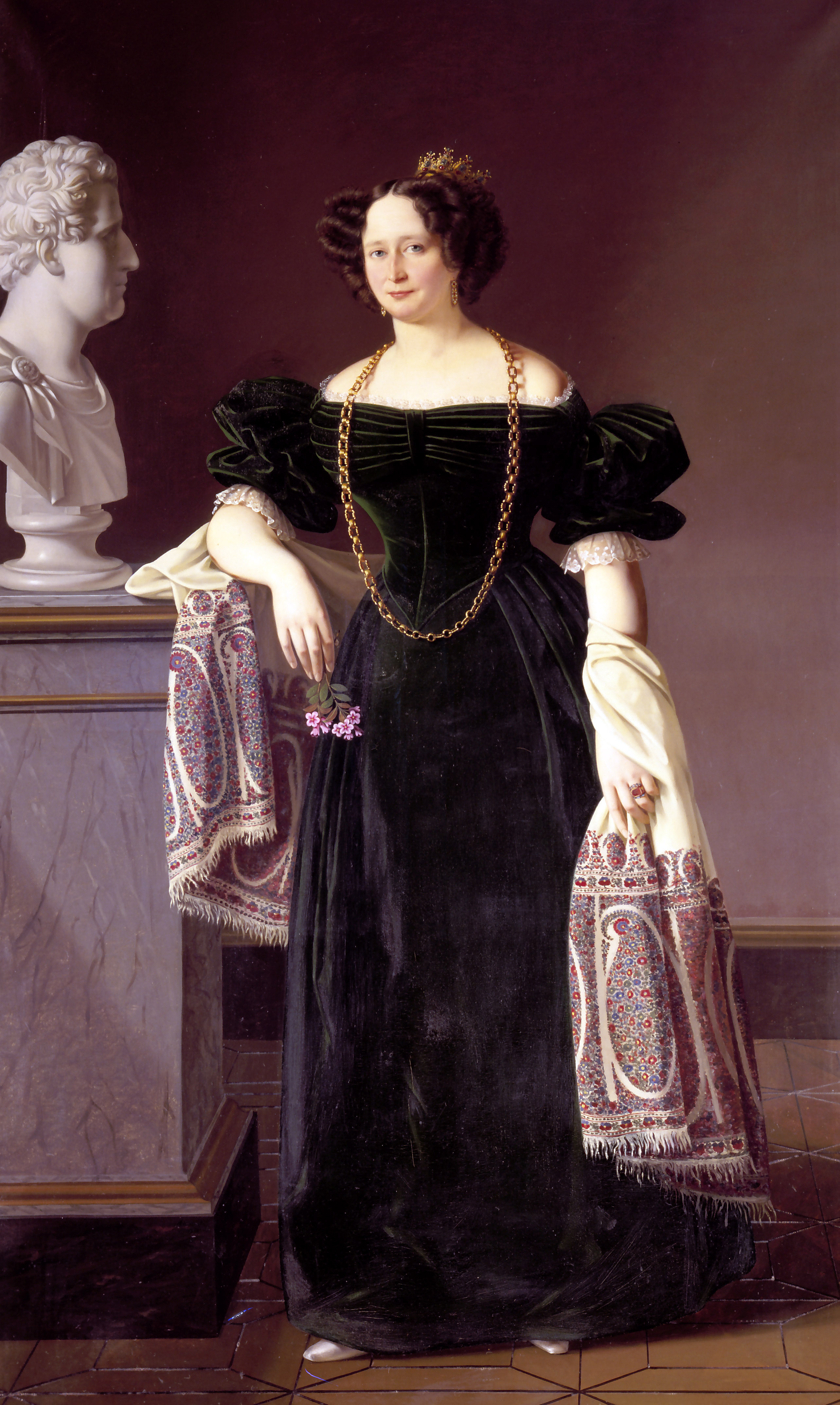
Caroline Amalie

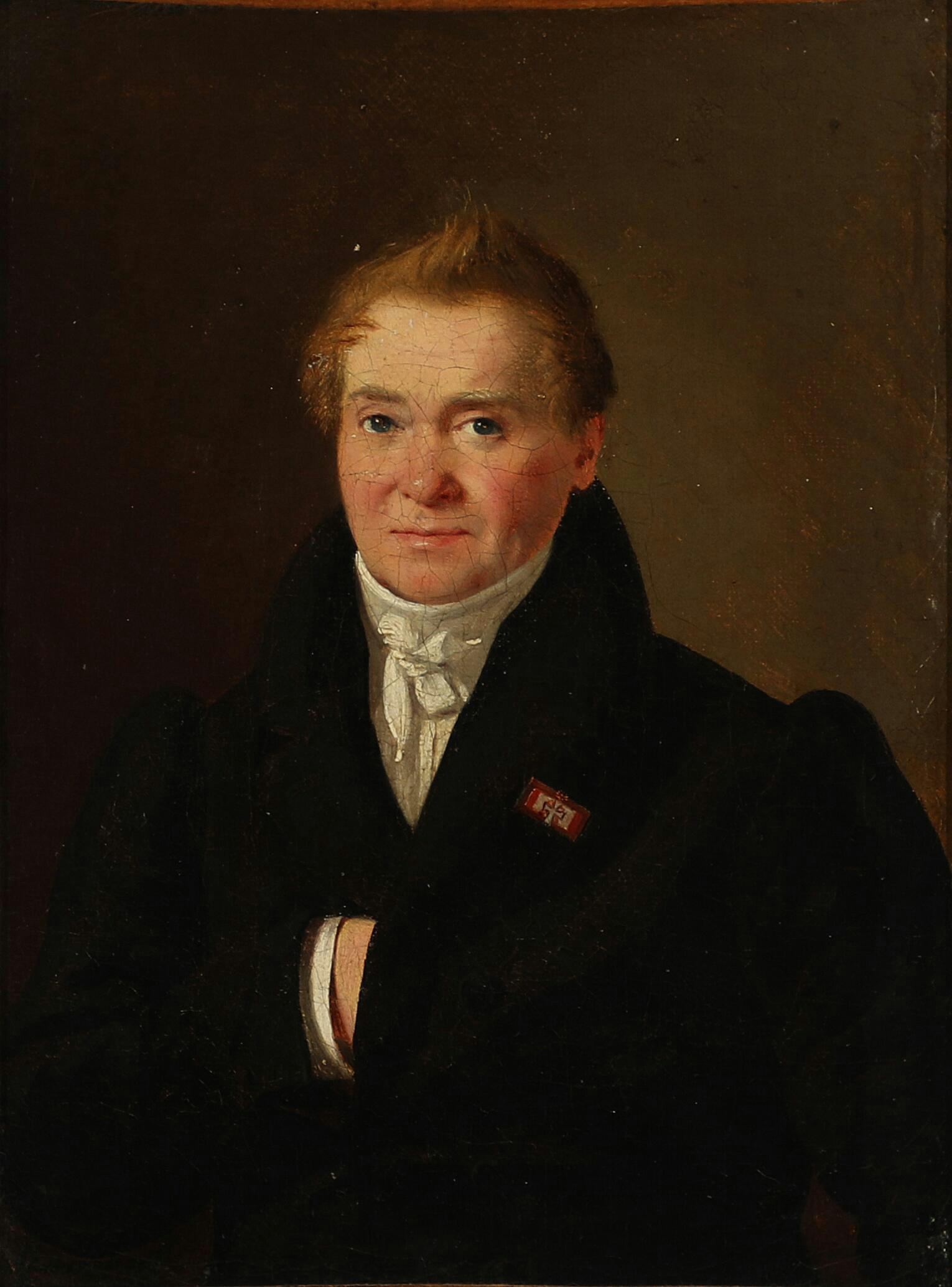
Claus Schall

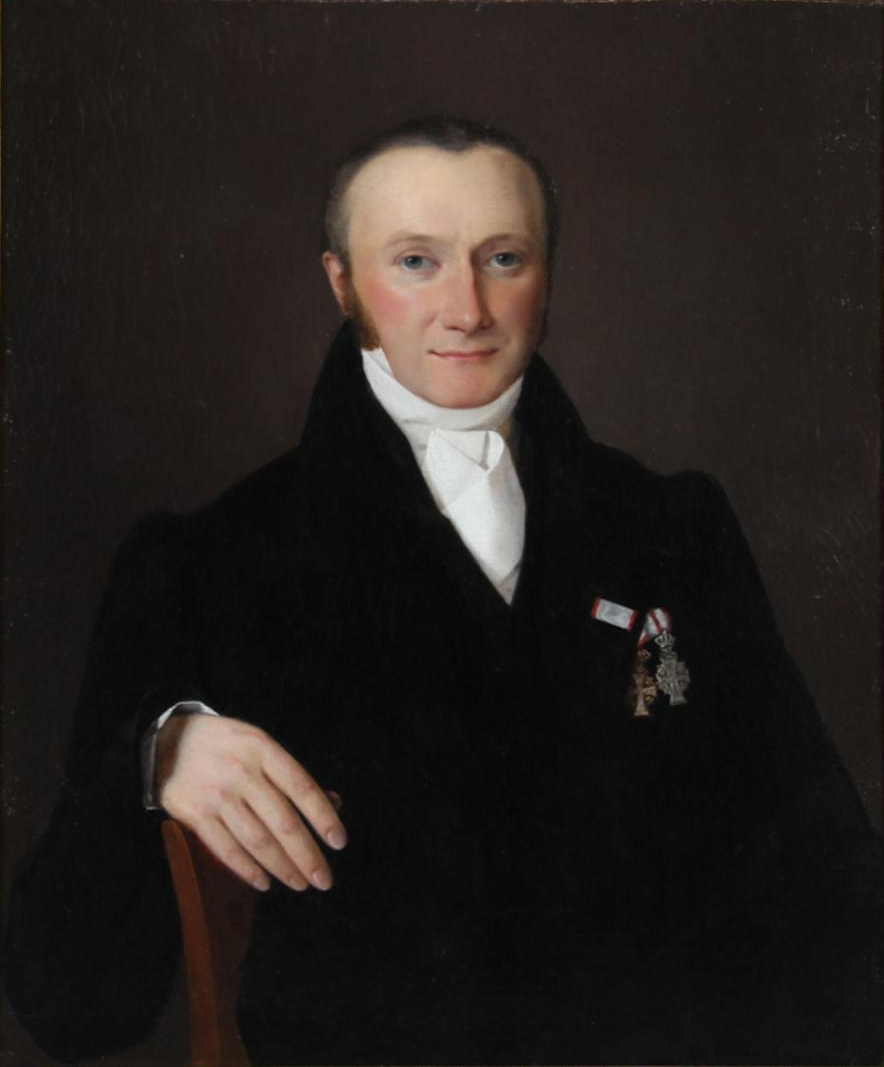
Christian Waagepetersen (1829)
