= Hotel Royal, Copenhagen =

Former hotel in Copenhagen, Denmark

Hotel Royal
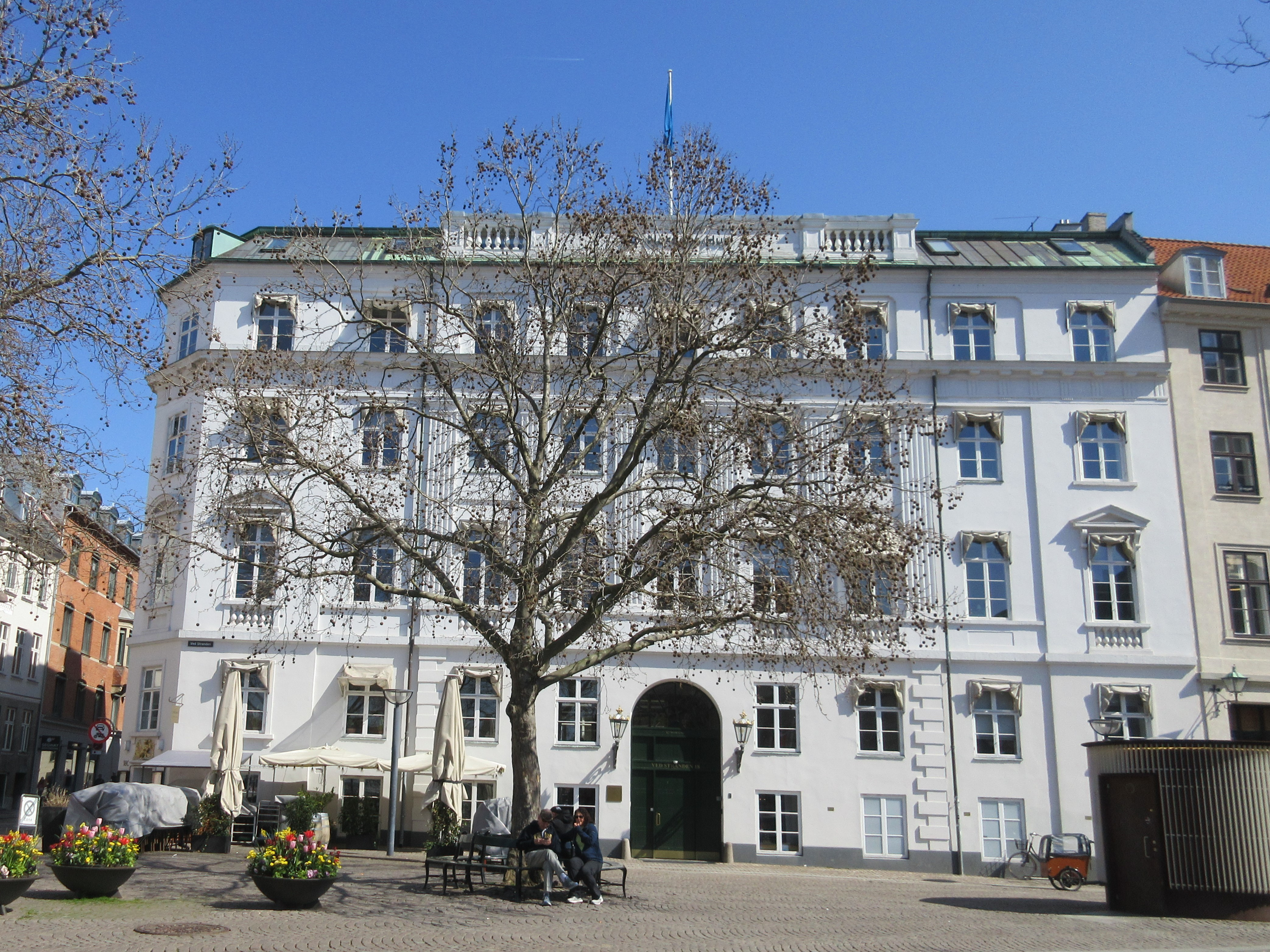
- Hotel Royal seen from Højbro
- Interactive map of the Hotel Royal area

General information
- Architectural style: Neoclassical
- Location: Copenhagen, Denmark
- Coordinates: 55°40′40.47″N 12°34′51.83″E
- Current tenants: Nordic Council
- Construction started: 1796
- Completed: 1798

Design and construction
- Architect: Jørgen Henrich Rawert

Hotel Royal is a former hotel located at the corner of Ved Stranden and Fortunstræde in central Copenhagen, Denmark. The hotel existed from 1798 until 1876 and the building has later housed a newspaper publishing house and the Danish Society of Engineers. The listed, Neoclassical building is now home to Nordic Council's operations in Denmark. It fronts Slotsholmens Kanal and is located opposite Christiansborg Palace on Slotsholmen.

== History ==
=== Origins ===
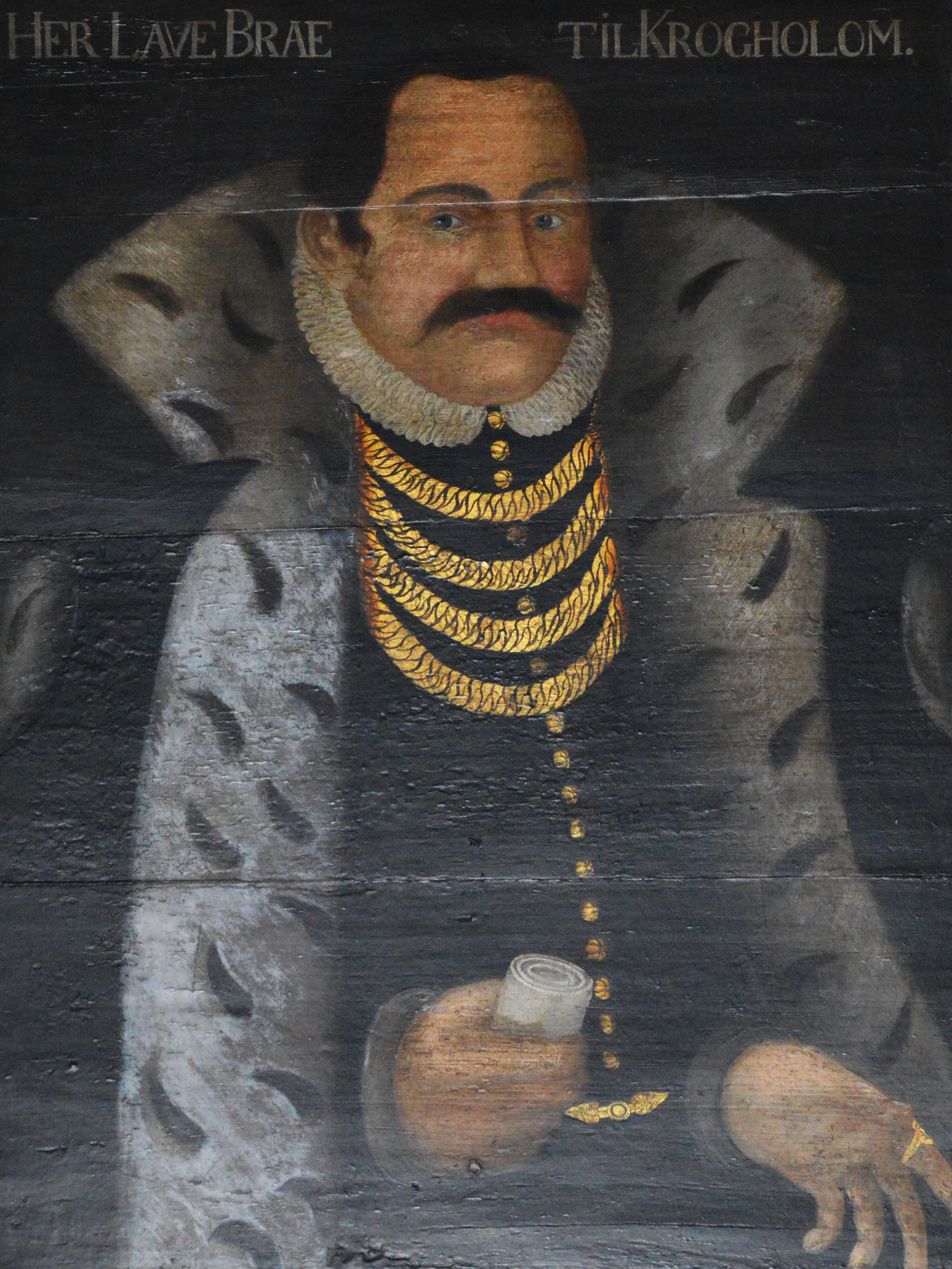
Lave Brahe

The first building at the site was a town house constructed by the nobleman Lave Brahe, who owned the estates Vittskövle and Krogholm in Scania. The building was later converted into an inn which was already on 6 April 1602 referred to as Fortunen (The Fortuna). From 1706 to 1720, Fortunen was owned by Frederik Rostgaard. He had studied Arabian in Germany, linguistics in the Netherlands and Old German, Old English and Greek in Oxford. He had later travelled to Paris, Italy and Malta, now mainly to collect valuable documents. On his return to Denmark, he had been appointed to gehejmearkivar in 1700. In 1725, he was accused of bribery and sentenced to loss of titles and expelled from Copenhagen.

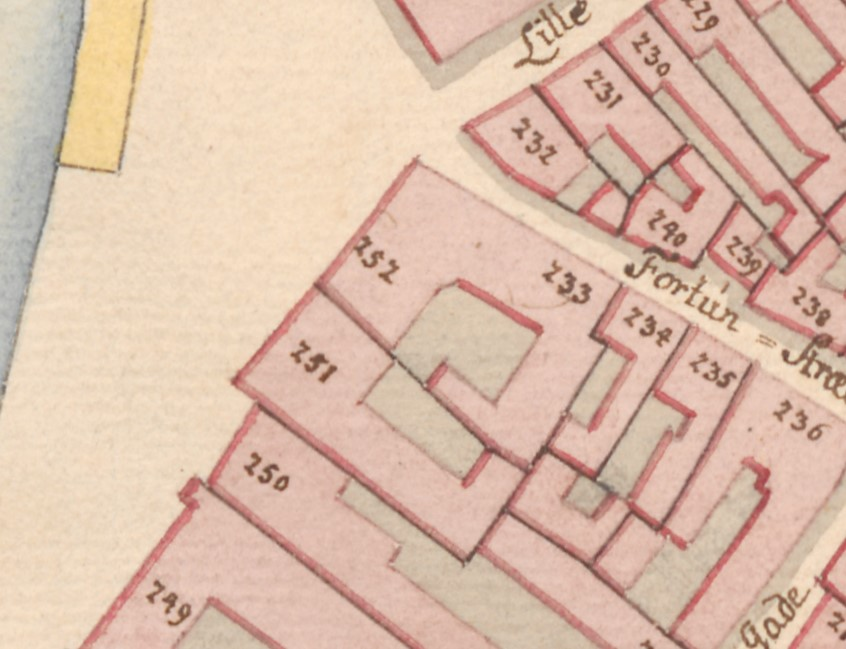
No. 251-252 and No. 233 seen on a detail from Christian Gedde's map of the East Quarter, 1757.

Fortunen's original buildings were demolished by a later owner, vine bottler Joachim Giesler, who replaced them by a new hotel building in 1748. He was a friend of king Frederick who had separate chambers installed on the first floor. The king also used the hotel for housing of guests in connection with larger celebrations at the royal palace. In the cellar was a tavern and vine store which had a gilded relief of Dionysos above its entrance. Many people thought it depicted Fortuna and the establishment therefore became known as Den Gyldne Fortun (The Gilded Fortuna).

=== Hotel Royal ===
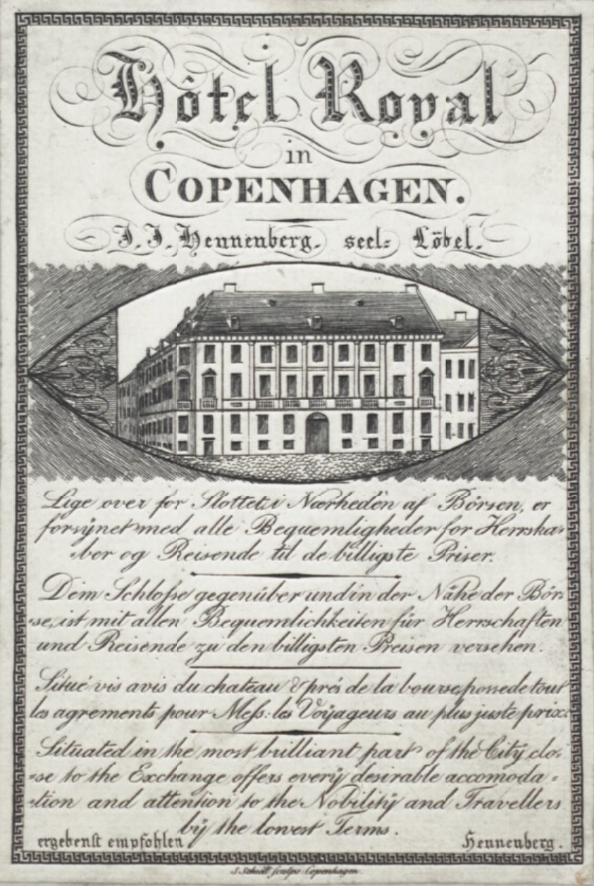
Advertisement for Hotel Royal

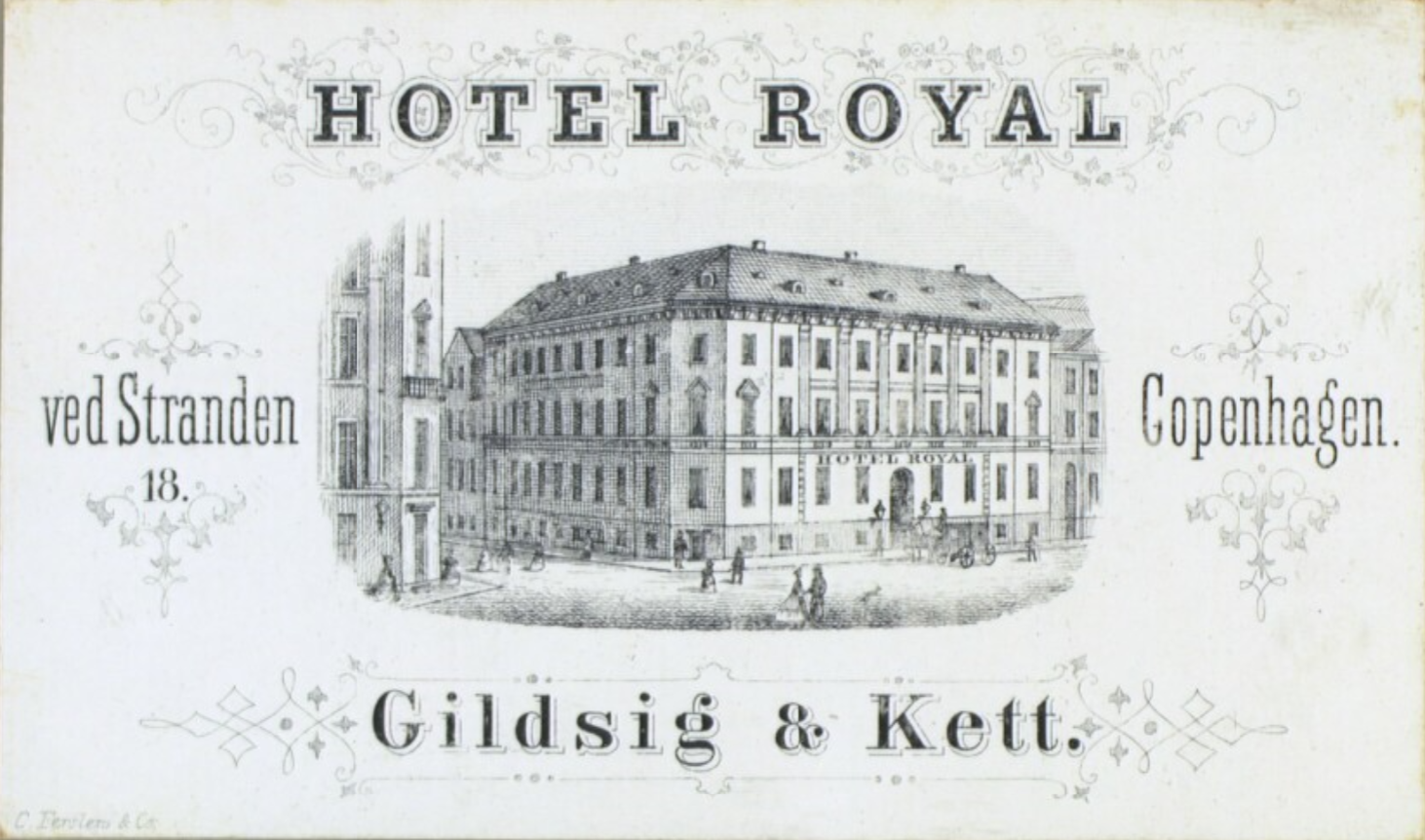
Advertisement for Hotel Royal

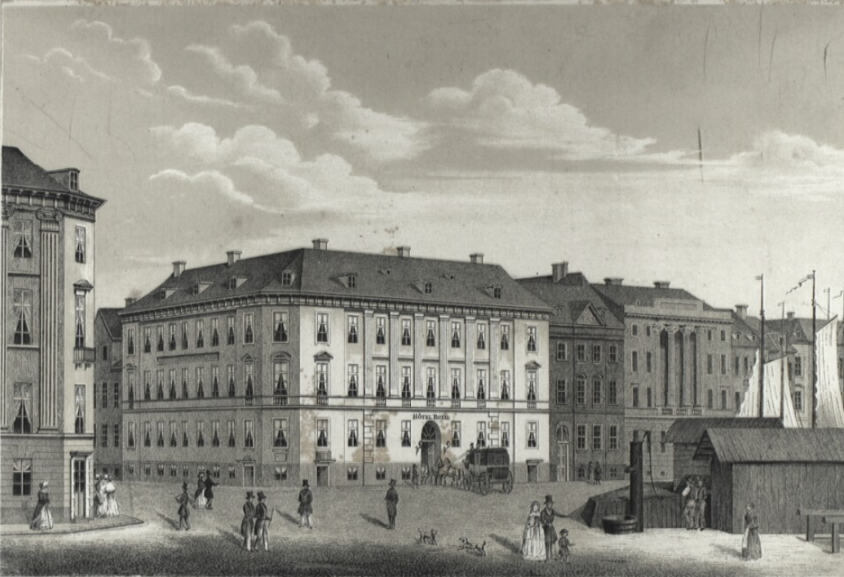
Hotel Royal

The building was completely destroyed in the Copenhagen Fire of 1795. The owner Heinrich Wilhelm Løbel soon began the construction of a new and more elegant hotel building and the hotel reopened under the name Hotel Royal in 1798. It is believed that the architect was Jørgen Henrich Rawert. It served a celebrated "Parisian" cuisine in the ground floor facing Fortunstræde.

The writer Bernhard Severin Ingemann who lived at Sorø Academy stayed in Hotel Royal during his visits to Copenhagen. The writer Hans Christian Andersen for a while had his home in the hotel. The Swedish singer Jenny Lind stayed at the hotel in 1845. One day prior to her departure, on 21 October, she held a dinner there for her Copenhagen friends which included Hans Christian Andersen.

Other notable guests include the German philosopher Friedrich Schleiermacher who stayed there during his visit to Copenhagen in 1833 and prime minister Carl Edvard Rotwitt who had his home there at the time of his early death in 1866.

=== Later history ===
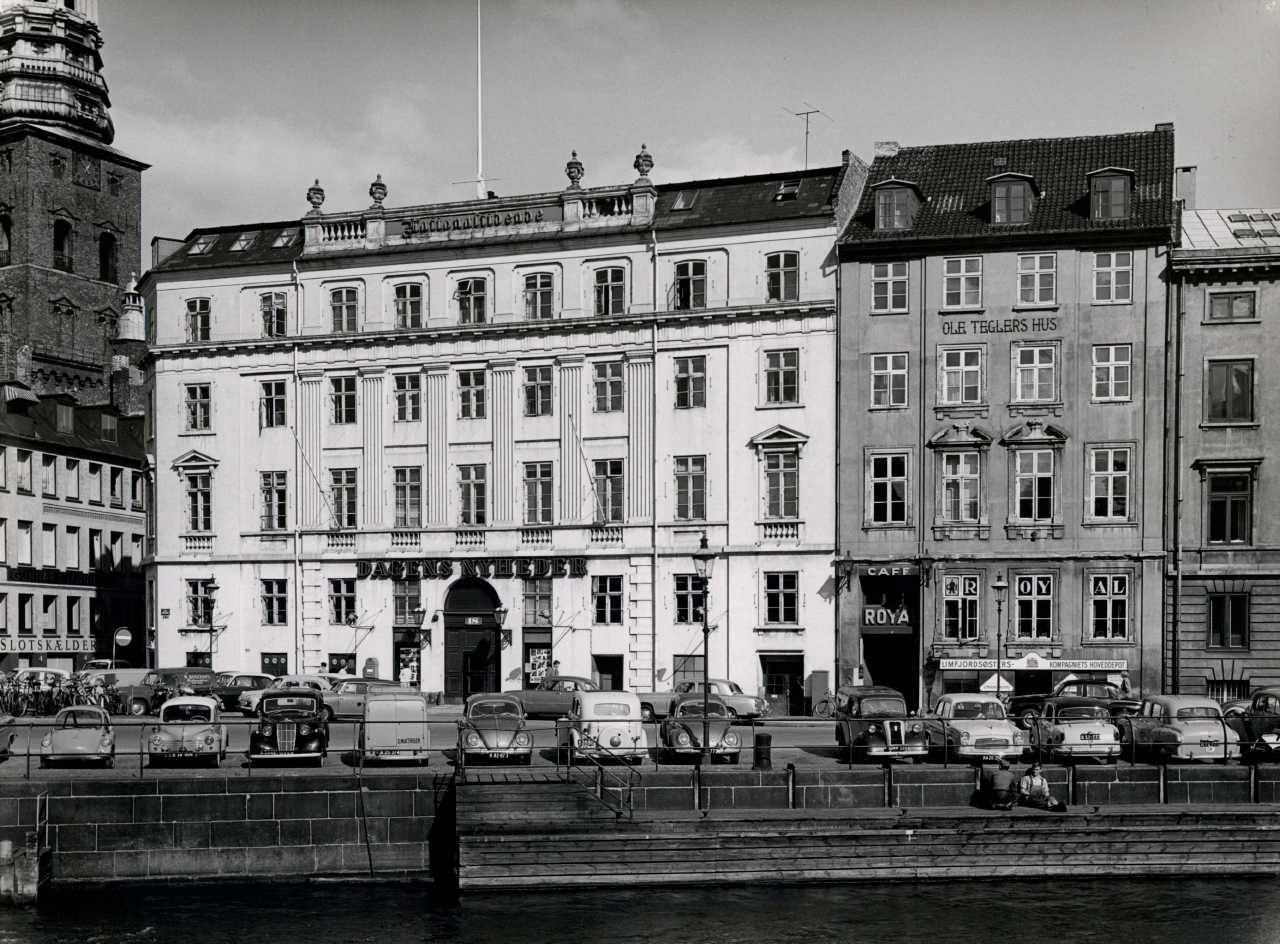
Hotel Royal

In 1876, the property was acquired by the publisher Jean Christian Ferslew. He had taken over his father's small printing business in 1857 and later developed it into a successful newspaper publishing house, De Ferslewske Blade. It was said about him that published Dagens Nyheder for the estate owners, Nationaltidende for the bourgeoisie of the bel étage, Dagbladet for the middle class on the second floor and Aftenposten Concierge in the basement. He had his home on the first floor and also ran his publishing business from the building. Om 1886, he commissioned the architect Valdemar Ingemann to expand the building with an extra floor.

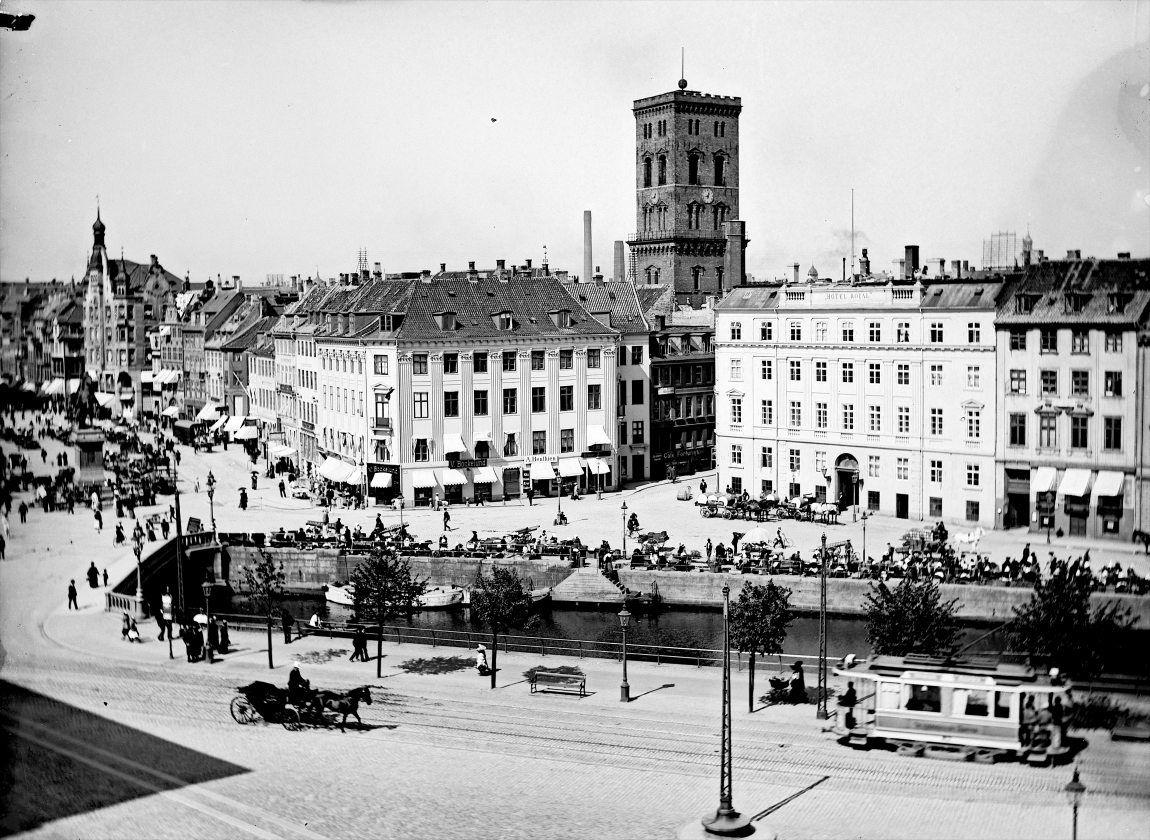
The Hotel Royal building in 1908

The building became known as Domus Technica after it was purchased by the Danish Society of Engineers (Ingeniør-Sammenslutningen) in June 1962. They undertook a major renovation of the building which was inaugurated as their new headquarters on 26 May 1967. The Engineers' Association relocated to a new purpose-built headquarters on Kalvebod Brygge in 1995.

== Today ==
The building now houses Nordic Council's operations in Copenhagen. The restaurant Fortunen is located in the basement. It is run by the owners of the Vesterbro café Dyrehaven on Sønder Boulevard and the night club Bakken in Kødbyen.
