= Christian Waagepetersen =

Danish wine merchant and art patron

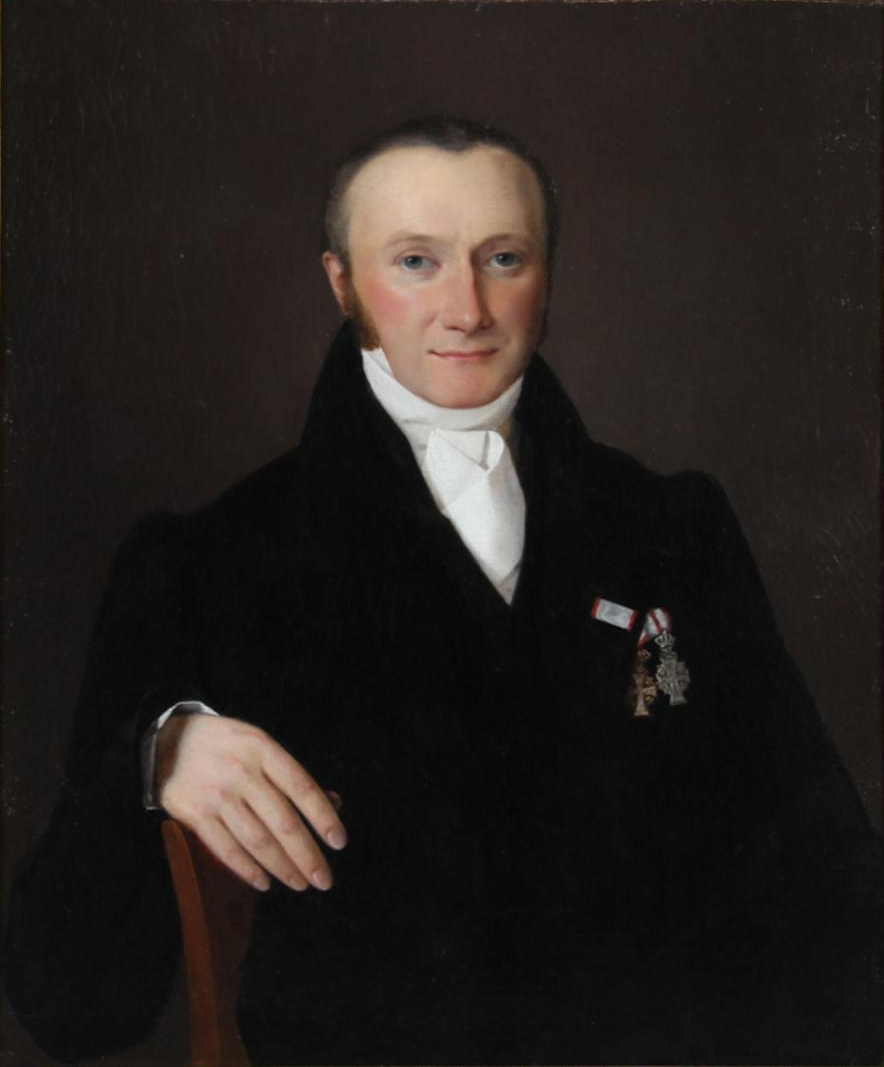
- Portrait by Louis Aumont, 1829
- Born: 6 September 1787; Copenhagen, Denmark
- Died: 23 November 1840 (aged 53); Copenhagen, Denmark
- Other names: known_for = Waagepetersen House, patronage
- Spouse: Albertine Emmerentse Schmidt
- Awards: Order of the Dannebrog

Christian Waagepetersen (6 September 1787 – 23 November 1840) was a Danish wine merchant and patron of the arts. The Waagepetersen House, his home on Store Strandstræde in Copenhagen, was a meeting place during the 1820s and 1830s for many leading figures of the Danish Golden Age. The neoclassical building is now listed.

He was born Christian Waage Petersen but changed his surname to Waagepetersen on 4 March 1831.

== Early life and education ==
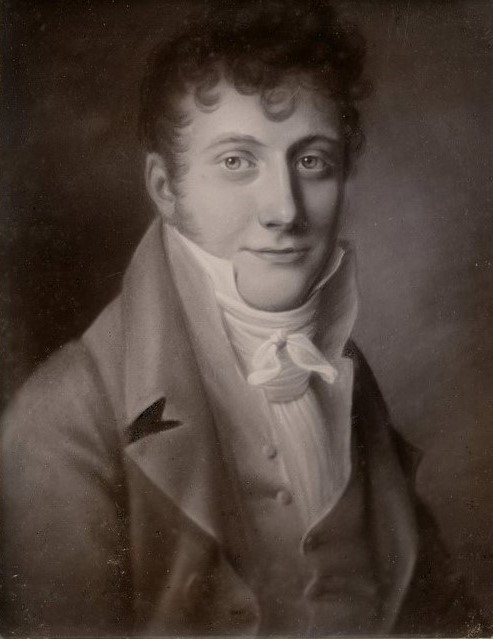
Christian Waagepetersen

Christian Waage Petersen was born on 6 September 1787 in Copenhagen, the son of Lorentz Petersen and his wife Sophie Magdalene Worm (1765–1832). His father worked for a councilman named Waage but later established himself as a wine merchant. Waagepetersen was taught the trade by his father before completing his training at trade offices abroad.

== Career ==
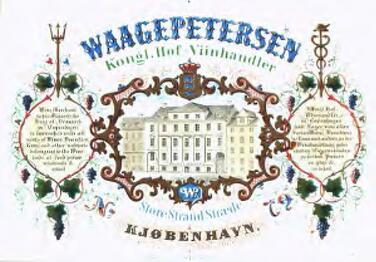
Advertisement for Waagepetersen's wine-dealing business

Waagepetersen established his own business in 1808. It grew rapidly and eventually became the leading wine dealer in the city. The company was based out of his property at Store Strandstræde 18, where he also had his home, from 1811. In 1827, he was appointed to royal wine merchant.

== Public offices ==
From 1808 to 1816 Waagepetersen was superintendent for the city's poorhouses (fattigforstander). From 1824 until 1835 he was a member of the Copenhagen Council of 32 Men.

== Personal life and legacy ==
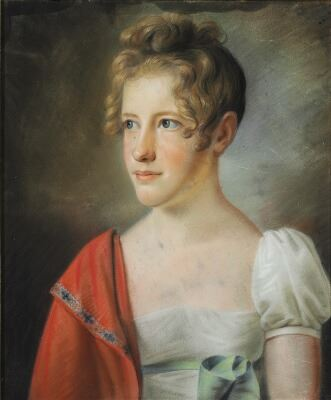
Albertine Emmerentze, née Schmidt

On 18 November 1809 Waagepetersen married Albertine Emmerentse Schmidt (13 October 1793 – 15 November 1864) in the Church of Holmen. She was the daughter of the wealthy merchant Albrecht Ludvig Schmidt (c. 1754–1821) and his wife Frederikke Christiane Restorff (c. 1759–1822). They had the following children:

- Adelaida Waage Petersen (30 October 1821 – 19 November 1890)
- Albertine Louise Waagepetersen (21 February 1826 – 22 February 1888)
- August Guillaume Beethoven Waagepetersen (2 October 1833 – 23 January 23)
- Christiane Sophie Waagepetersen (8 September 1810 – 10 February 1873)
- Ludvig Lorentz Mozart Waagepetersen (22 October 1813 – 25 February 1885)
- Frederik Conrad Trepka Waage Petersen (circa 22 October 1824 – 3 May 1864)
- Waldemar Waagepetersen (21 July 1828 – 24 October 1828)
- Constance Waagepetersen (circa 1830)
- Suzette Caroline Eliza Waagepetersen (1838)

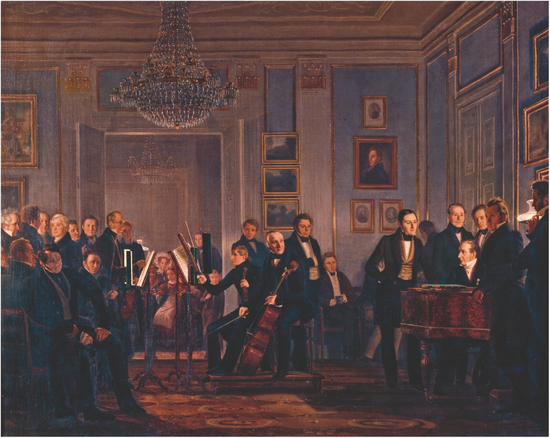
A music soirée painted by Wilhelm Marstrand

Waagepetersen was also a patron for the arts and sciences. When the College of Advanced Technology was founded, he donated a fully equipped chemical laboratory. He was particularly fond of music as witnessed by the fact that he named three of his sons after Haydn, Mozart and Beethoven.

Waagepetersen died on 23 November 1840. He is buried at the Garrison Cemetery in Copenhagen.

One of his sons, Mozart Waagepetersen, continued his wine company. He also took over the building in Store Strandstræde but sold it in the 1870s. Christian Waagepetersen's second eldest daughter Albertine was married to Carl Harald Mønster, another prominent wine dealer. Another daughter, Christine, was married to the physician Jacob Christian Bendz. His brother, Wilhelm Bendz, painted the Waagepetersen Family Portrait.
