= Jægersborg Barracks =

Military building in Gentofte, Denmark

Coordinates: 55.7625°N 12.5383°E

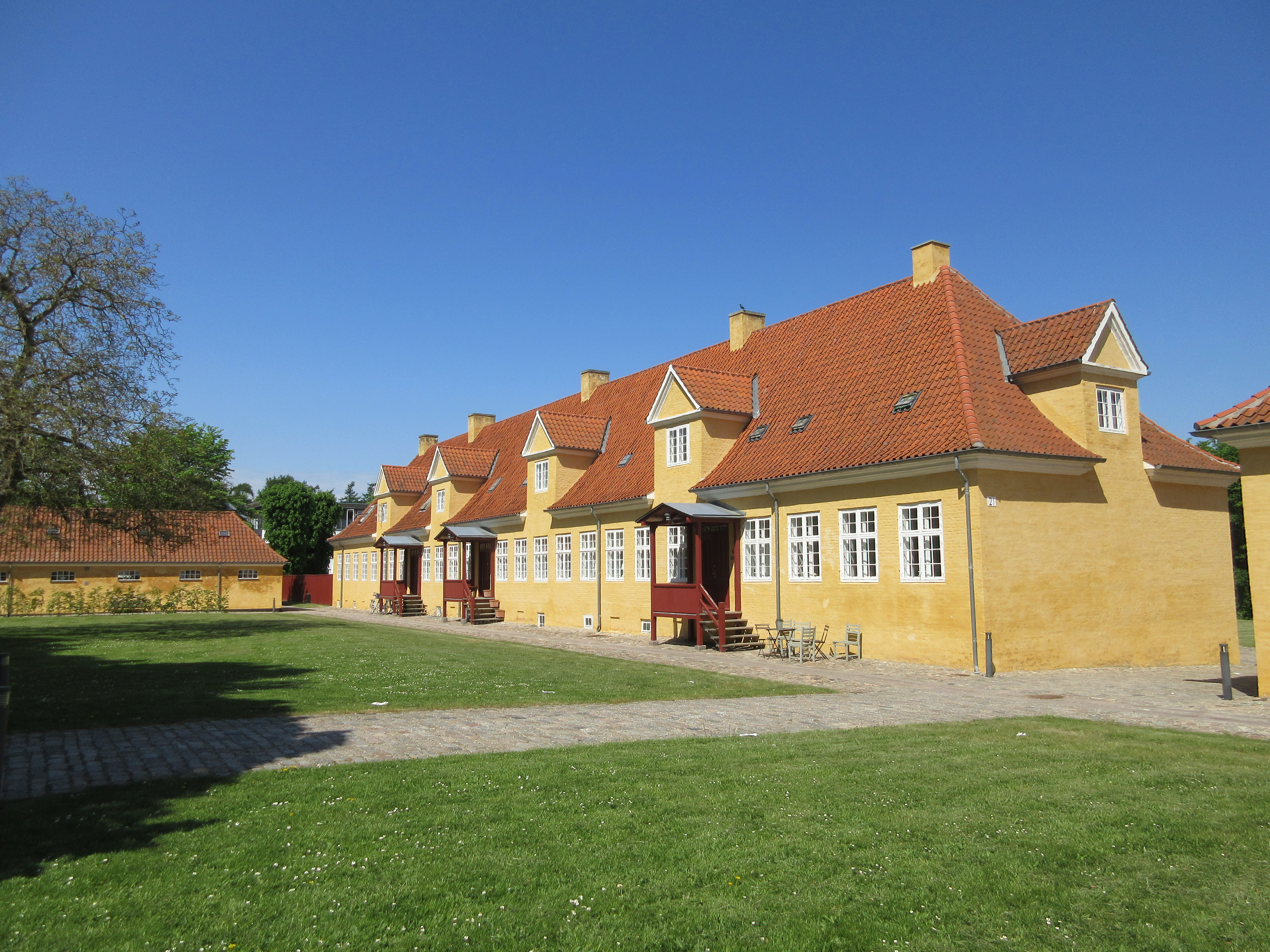
Jægersborg Barracks

Jægersborg Barracks (Danish: Jægersborg Kaserne), also known as Jægergården, is a former military facility located on Jægersborg Allé in Gentofte in the northern suburbs of Copenhagen, Denmark. It was converted into housing in 2010.

== History ==
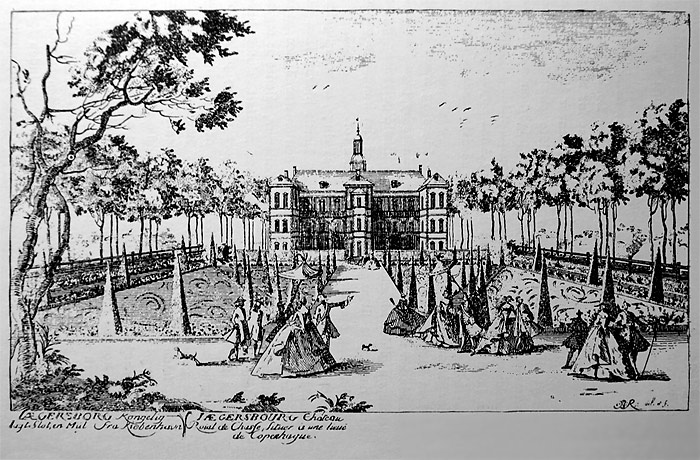
Jægersborg

Christian IV constructed a hunting lodge named Ibstrup at the site in 1620. It was later renamed Jægersborg by Christian BII. The building was partly used as barracks from 1818.

The current buildings, Jægersborg Jægergård or simply Jægergården, was built in 1734-38 by royal architect Lauritz de Thurah for the royal hunting dogs, horses and as residential quarters for officials associated with the royal hunts. The buildings replaced a group of buildings that were located immediately to the west of Jægersborg House. Jægersborg was at the same time replaced by the Hermitage Hunting Lodge and the old building was demolished in 1760.

Christian VI discontinued the traditional Par force hunting in 1741 but it was later reintroduced by Frederick V who then completed Jægergården in 1747. Frederick V was seriously injured in a hunting accident and once again stopped the par force hunts in 1760.

Jægergården was taken over by the Guard Hussar Regiment in 1797 for use as an equestrian facility. They constructed an equestrian house and new stables at the site to the east of Jægergården where the royal hunting lodge had formerly stood.

Jægergården housed the Royal Life Guards' recruit school from 1909 to 1948.

The Royal Danish Military's medical corps took over the buildings in 1963. The Guard Hussar Regiment's old stables to the east of Kægergården were demolished in 1862 and replaced by a new educational building.

The facility was renamed Forsvarets Sanitetsskole in 1974. It was located at the site until 2009. Jægergården was sold to Ehendomsselskabet Norden in 2010. The educational building from 1963 was acquired by Gentofte Municipality and replaced by a nursery home.

== Architecture ==
The complex consists of yellow-dressed brick buildings with red tile roofs and is centered on a large, rectangular lawn with a row of large trees along its central axis. The four buildings located to the south and north of the lawn have three tall, gabled wall dormers and used to serve as residential wings. Wooden staircases lead up to the entrances of the northwestern building. The four, lower buildings located to the east and west of the lawn are former dog houses. The two long stable wings that follow Jægersborg Allé to the south of the two southern residential wings were originally stables. A short side wing with gabled wall dormers on each side that projects from the south side of the southeastern residential wing divide the narrow space between the southern residential wings and the stable wings in two cobbled court yards. The complex is accessed from a parking lot situated to the east of it.

== Commemorative plaques ==
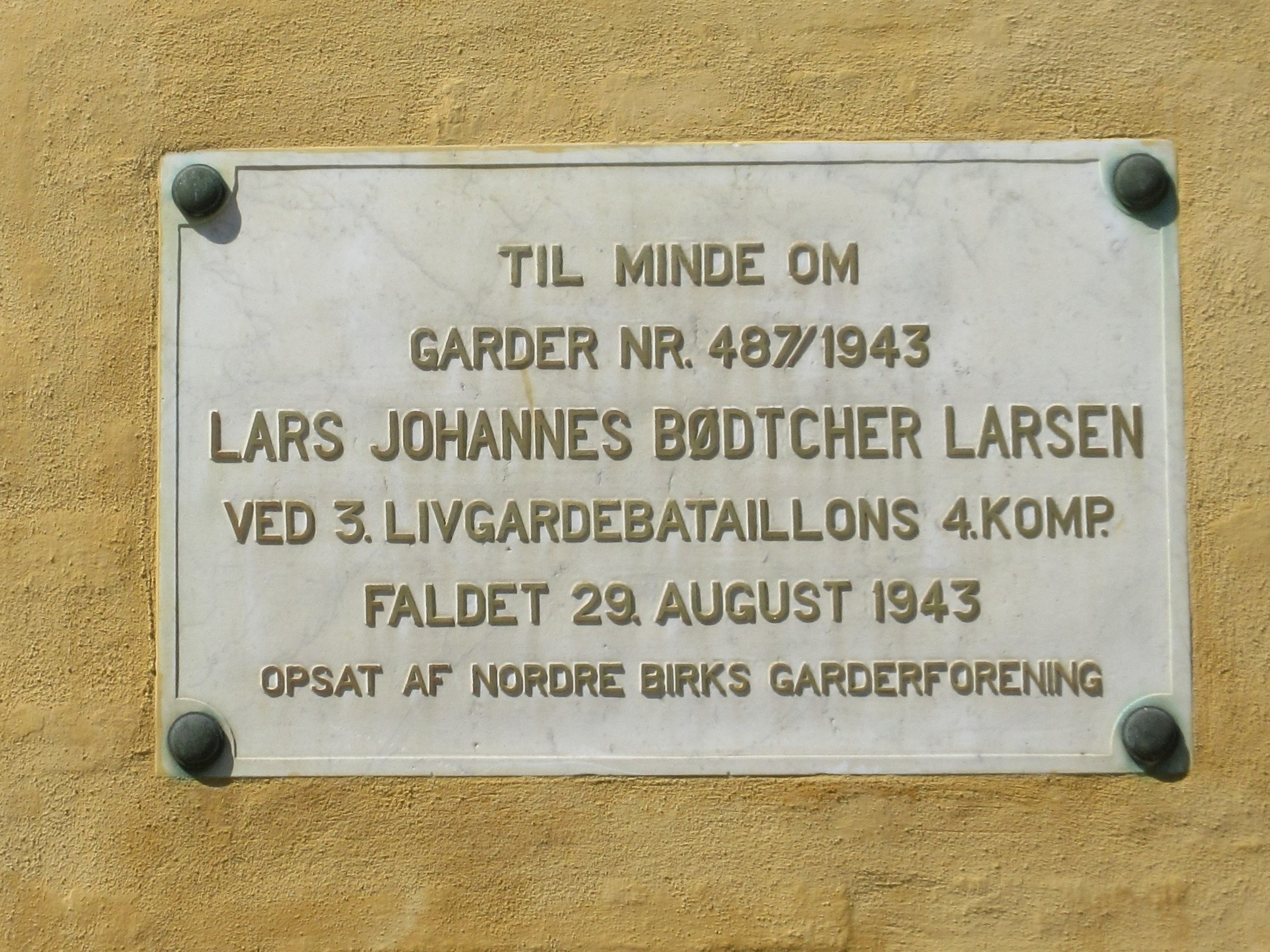
Plaque commemorating that royal life guard Lars Johannes Bøtcher Larsen was killed in battle on 29 August 1943.

Three commemorative plaques have been installed on walls facing the parking lot. One of them commemorates the royal life guards (Livgardens Detachement) that were stationed at the site from 1853 until 19018 and that the recruit school was based at the site from 1909 until 1946. Another one commemorates royal life guard Lars Johannes Bøtcher Larsen who was killed in battle on 29 August 1943.

== Today ==
The complex was converted into apartments in 2010.

== Cultural references ==
Jægersborg Barracks was used as a location in the films Frøken Nitouche (1963), Hurra for de blå husarer (1970) and Olsen-banden Junior (2001).
