= Ved Stranden =

Street in Copenhagen, Denmark

Coordinates: 55.6774°N 12.5812°E

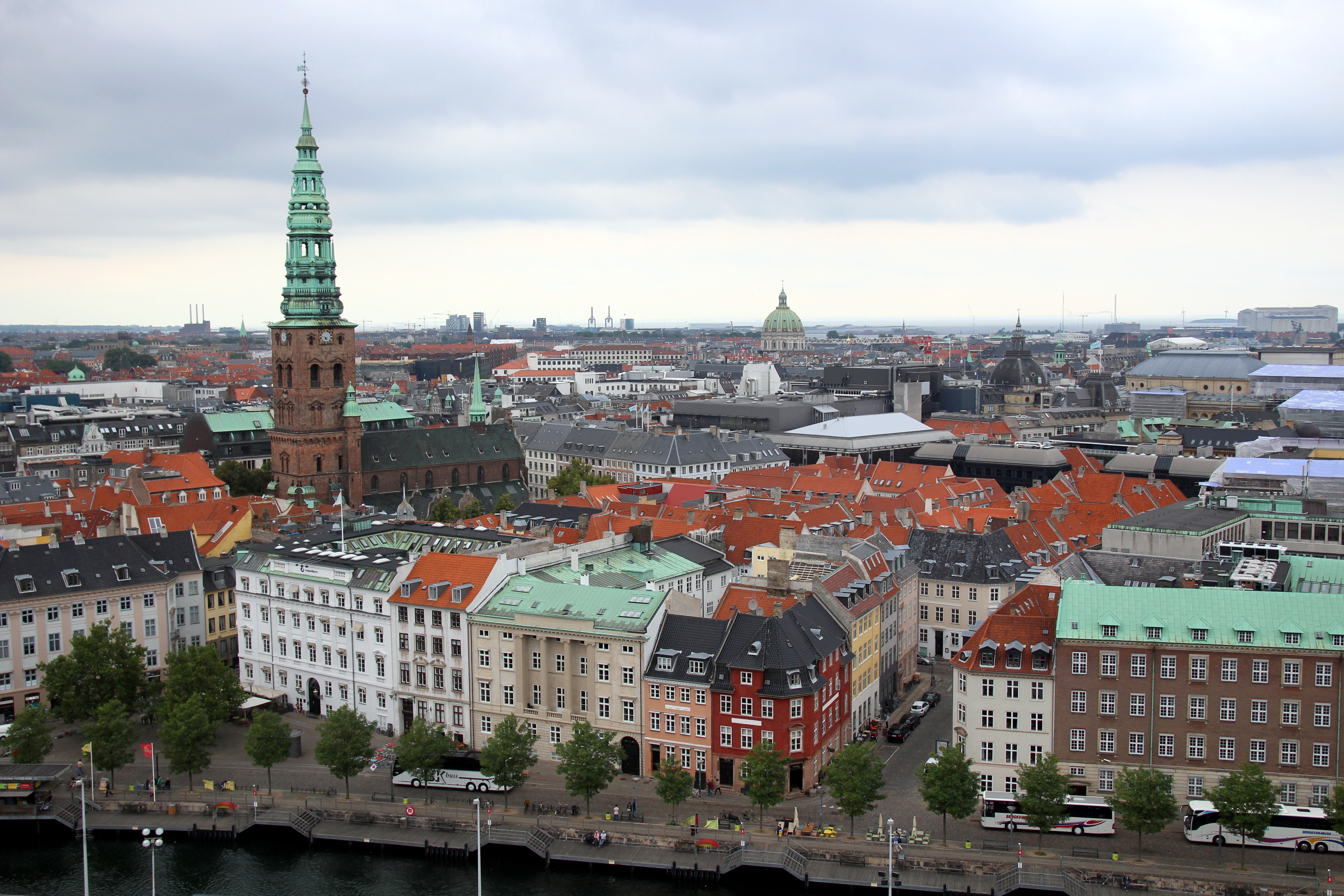
Ved Stranden viewed from Christiansborg's tower

Ved Stranden (lit. "At the Beach") is a canal side public space and street which runs along a short section of the Zealand side of Slotsholmen Canal in central Copenhagen, Denmark. It begins at Holmens Kanal, opposite the Church of Holmen, and runs west along the canal for one and a half blocks before widening into a small, triangular space adjacent to Højbro Bridge and Højbro Plads. The name of the street refers to Gammel Strand, 'Old Beach', which it formed part of until 1961.

== Buildings ==
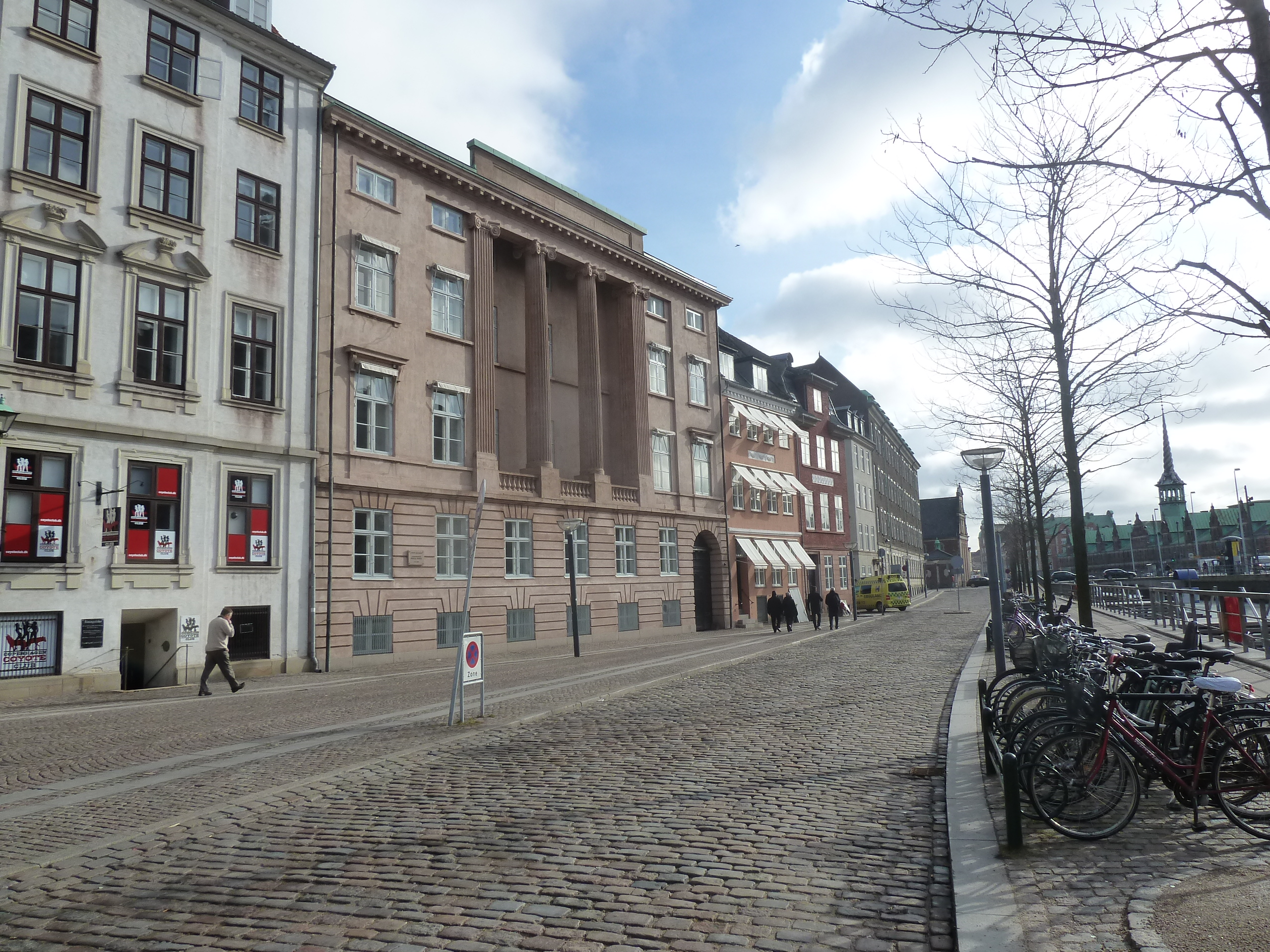
Ved Stranden at Gustmeyer House

Most of the buildings in the street date from the rebuilding of the city following the Copenhagen Fire of 1795 and are listed. No. 10 and 12 were built in 1796–1797 to the design of unknown architects. The Gustmeyer House at No. 14 was designed by Johan Martin Quist and completed in 1797. It is one of Copenhagen's first bourgeois residences with free-standing columns.

The former Royal Hotel (No. 18), once one of the city's finest hotels, is from 1798 and was designed by Jørgen Henrich Rawert but was expanded with an extra floor in 1886 after it had been taken over by a newspaper publishing house. It is now home to Nordic Council's operations in Copenhagen.

The Ploug House at No. 20 was designed by Andreas Hallander and built 1798-1799 for the merchant C. F. Friderici but takes its name after the writer and politician Carl Ploug who acquired it in 1862. Its facade is decorated with pilasters.

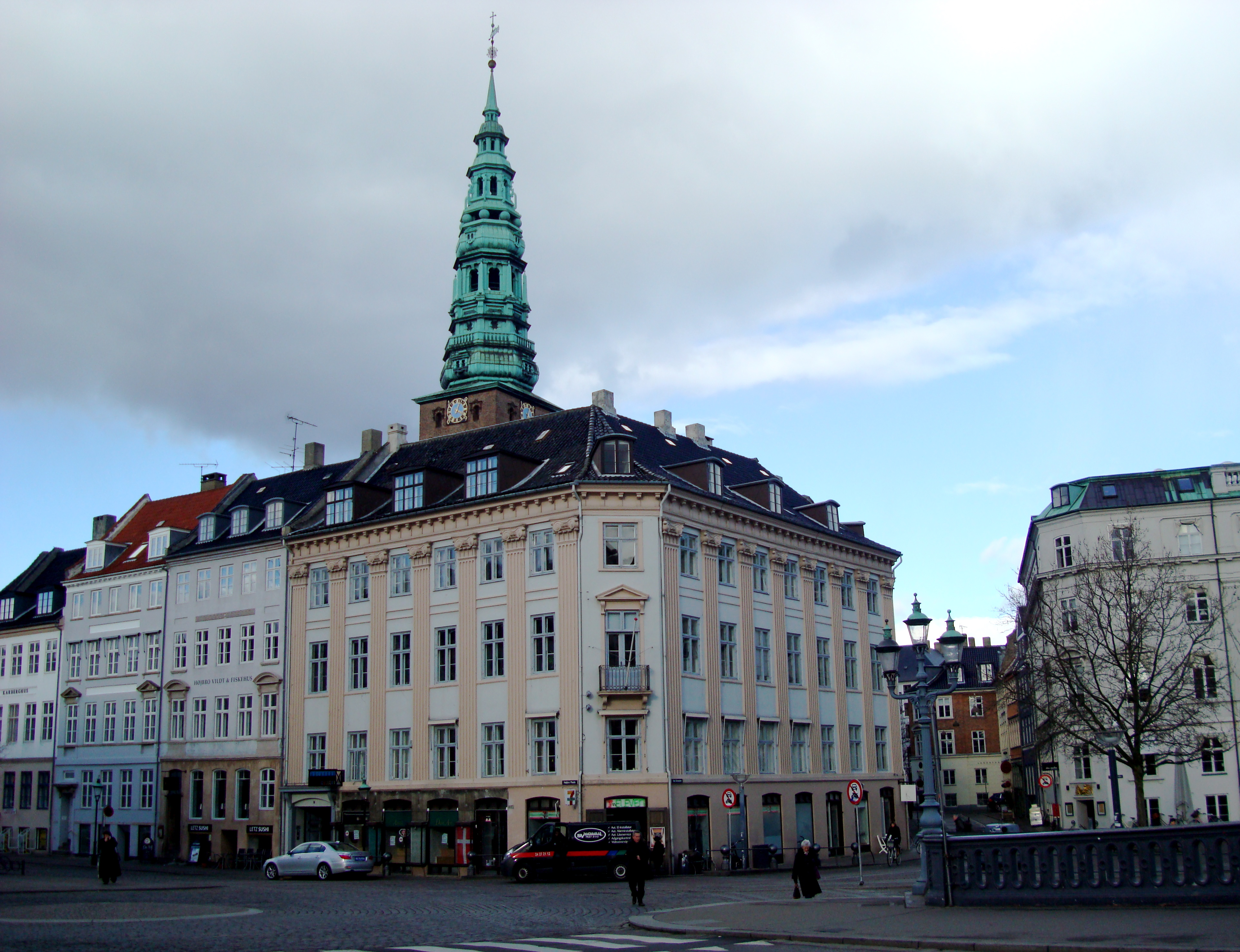
Ploug House viewed from the other side of the canal

The only building in the street which predates the Great Fire of 1795 is No. 16 which was built by Philip de Lange for General War Commissioner Stephen Hansen in 1748. The only building of younger date is No. 2 at the corner of Holmens Kanal, the former headquarters of Nordisk Genforsikring, an insurance company, which replaced several older properties when it was built between 1932 and 1938. It was designed by N. P. P. Gundstrup and has 18 bays facing Ved Stranden, five bays facing Holemns Kanal and 18 bays facing Admiralgade on the other side of the block.

== Use ==
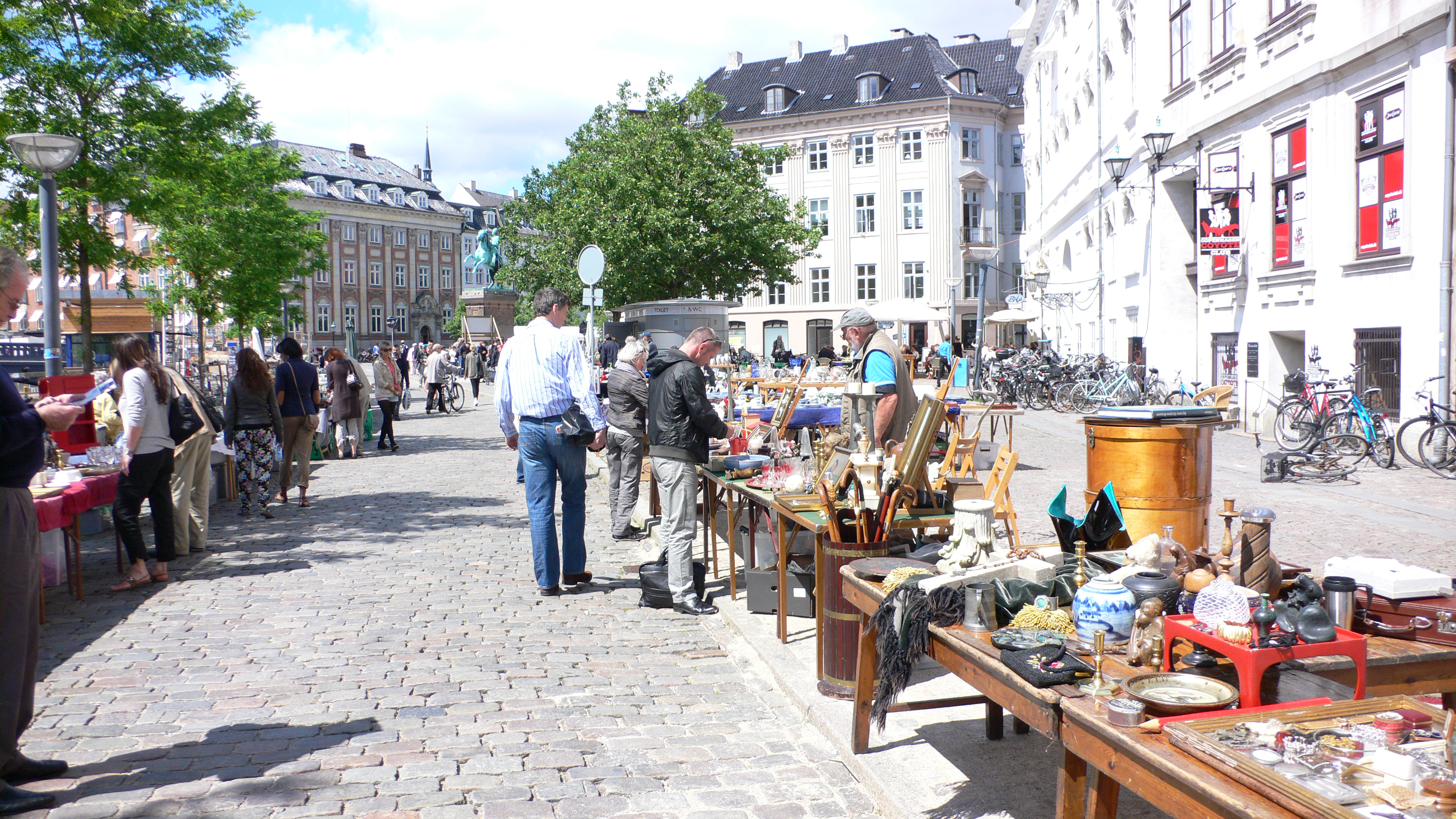
A flea market at Ved Stranden

Ved Vejen is the site of a monthly flee market. The canal boats have a stop on the canal front.

== Cultural references ==
The Olsen-banden gang steals a suitcase at Ved Stranden 6 in The Olsen Gang's Big Score. Ved Stranden is also used as a location in The Last Exploits of the Olsen Gang at 0:52:19.

== See also ==
- Frederiksholms Kanal
- Albrecht Ludwig Schmidt
