= Christian Nielsen Lindbach =

Danish goldsmith and developer

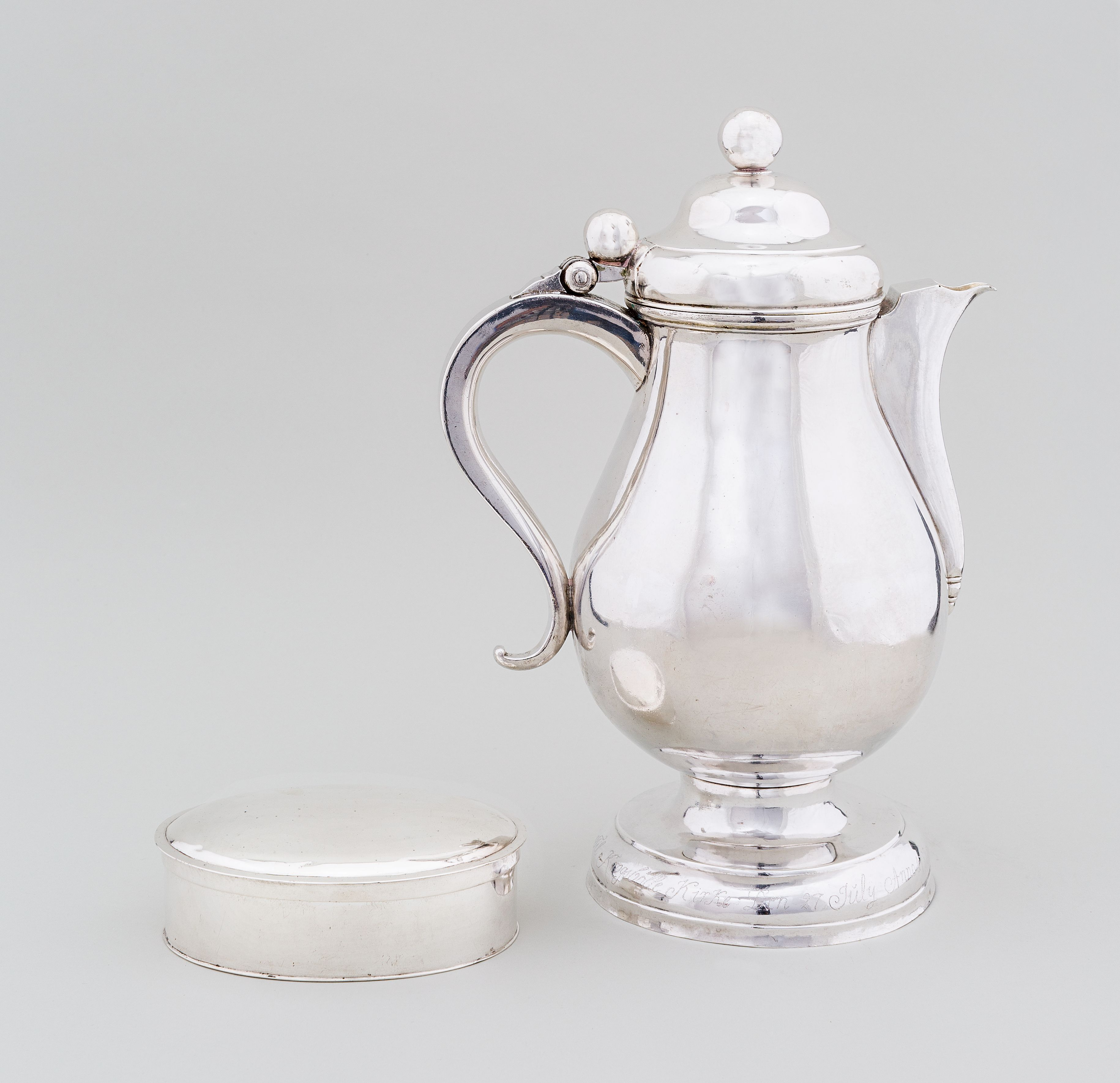
Altar pitcher by Lindbach (1788), donated by count Joachim Godske Moltke to Krogsbølle Church

Christian (Christen) Nielsen Lindbach (1738–1815) was a Danish master goldsmith. His works are represented in a number of Danish museum collections and churches. He is also remembered for contributing to the rebuilding of Copenhagen after the Great Fire of 1795.

== Biography ==
Lindbach was born in Copenhagen. On 1 June 1767, he was licensed as a master goldsmith. He was the younger brother of ropemaker Laurits Lindbach (born 1735); Bestergade No. 251.

In 1767, he married Johanne Dorothea Valentin (1740–1816). Their first home together was on Studiestræde. Their eldest son Niels Christian (1767–1797) became a goldsmith. Their daughter Frederikke Dorothea (1770–1801) married twice, first to ship captain Poul Andreas Soelberg and then in 1798 in Aarhus to Christian Peter Cold (1764-ca 1797). The daughter Margrethe Cathrine (1779–1830) was married to goldsmith Hans Christian Clausen (1778–1826).

On 17 March 1777, Lindbach bought a property at the corner of Laksegade and Admiralgade (No. 289, Eastern Quarter). His workshop was located in the side wing on Admiralgade.

In c. 1793, he bought a house for his sister Else Kristine Lindbach (widow of a ropemaker) in Dragør (Hollandsfed, No 10). In 1890, he also bought a house for his eldest son at the corner of Jolmens Kanal and Skvalderstræde (now Nikolajgade).

At the time of the 1787 census, Lindbach employed the goldsmiths Peter Hansen (1763–1797) and Jens Christian Møller (1764-) and the apprentices Christian Olsen (1769–1804) and Jørgen Balthasar Møller (1768-1822 Ålborg).

Lindbach's house on Laksegade was destroyed in the Copenhagen Fire of 1795. They found a temporary home at the corner of Christianshavns Torv and Dronningensgade (No. 375).

In 1797–1800 he constructed a new house for his own use at Ved Stranden 8. He also bought a number of the fire sites next to his old house at the corner of Laksegade and Admiralgade. He used the land for the construction of four more buildings at buildings at Laksegade 32/Admiralgade 25, Admiralgade 23/Dybensgade, Laksegade 30 and Dybensgade 21.

In 1807, Lindbach sold Dybensgade 21 to distiller Stefan Hønggaard. In the same year, he sold Admiralgade 23 to Dorothea Eleonora Olsen.

== Legacy ==
Lindbach's works as a goldsmith are represented in a wide range of Danish museums, churches and private collections. They are frequently sold at auctions.

Gis five surviving buildings in Copenhagen's Eastern Quarter are all listed in the Danish registry of protected buildings and places.

== Gallery ==
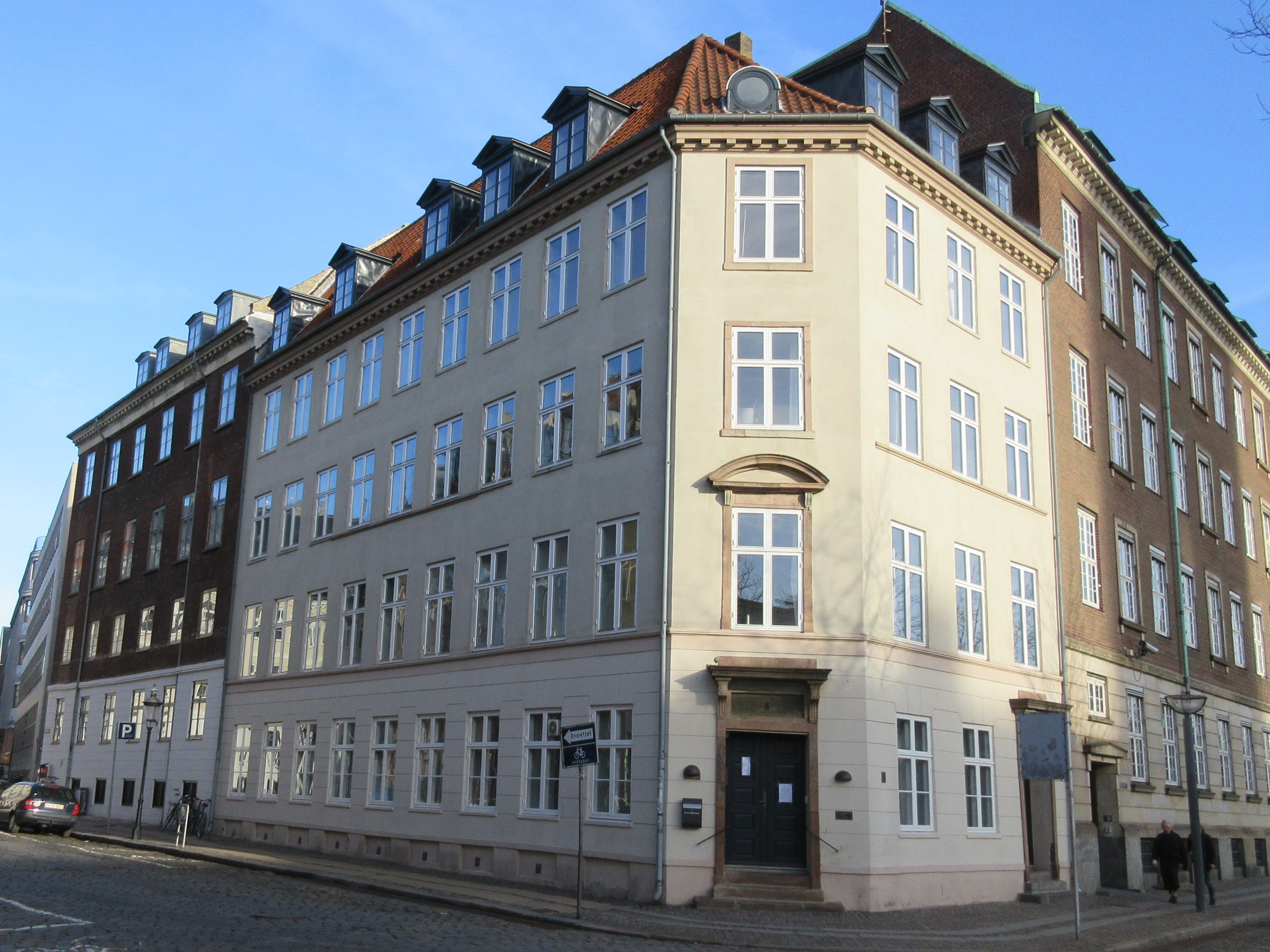
Ved Stranden 8

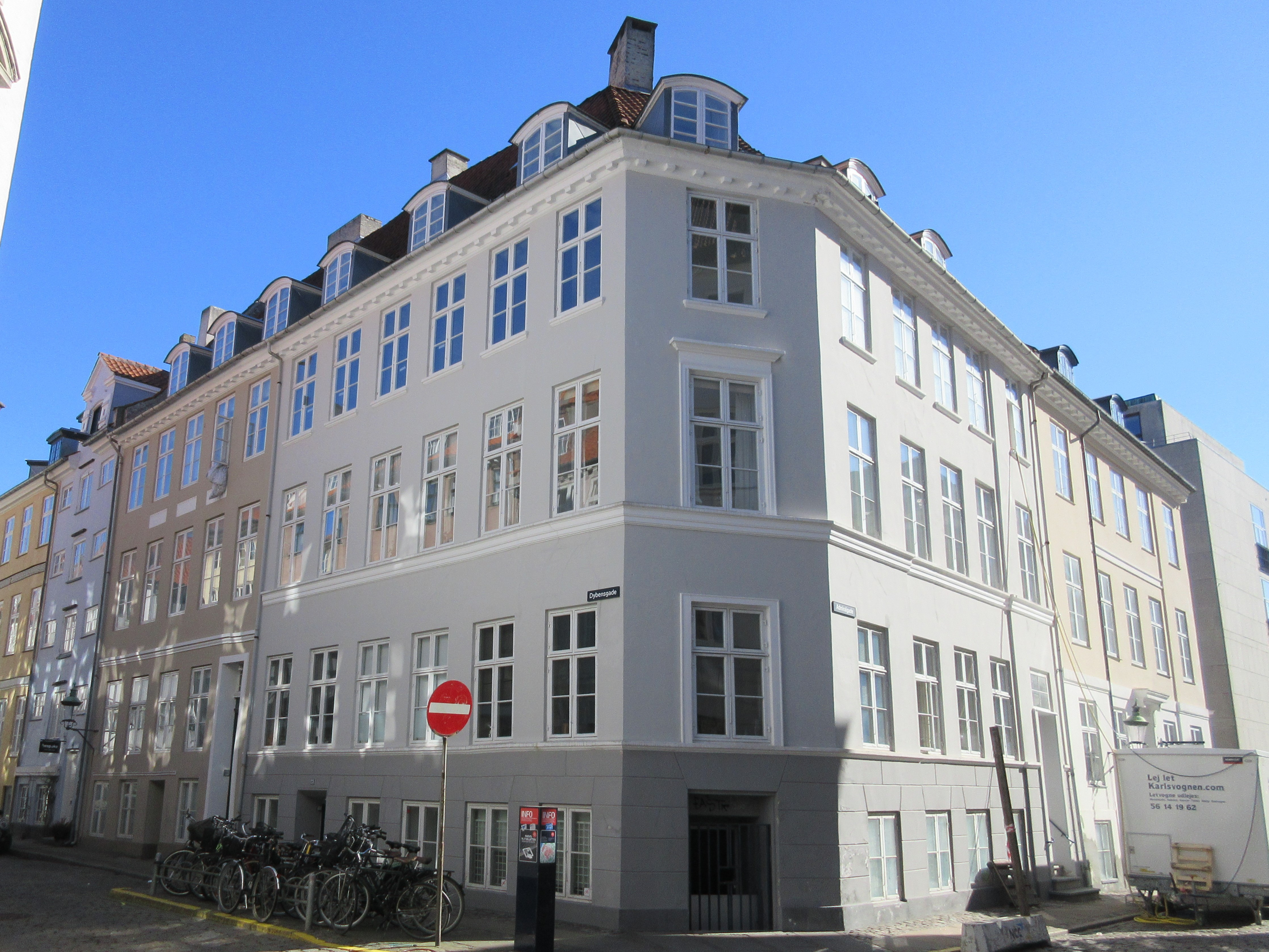
Admiralgade 23

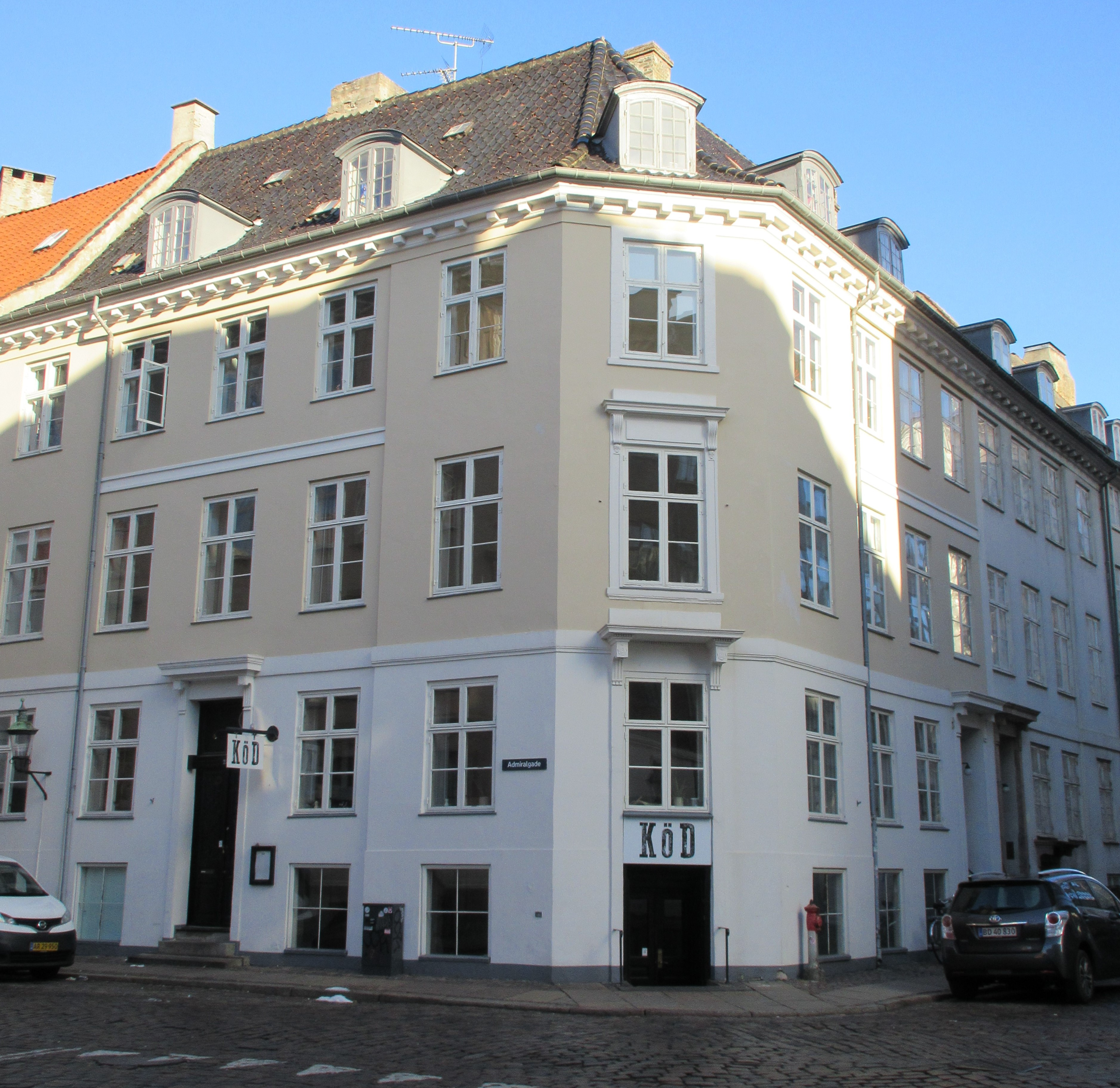
Admiralgade 25

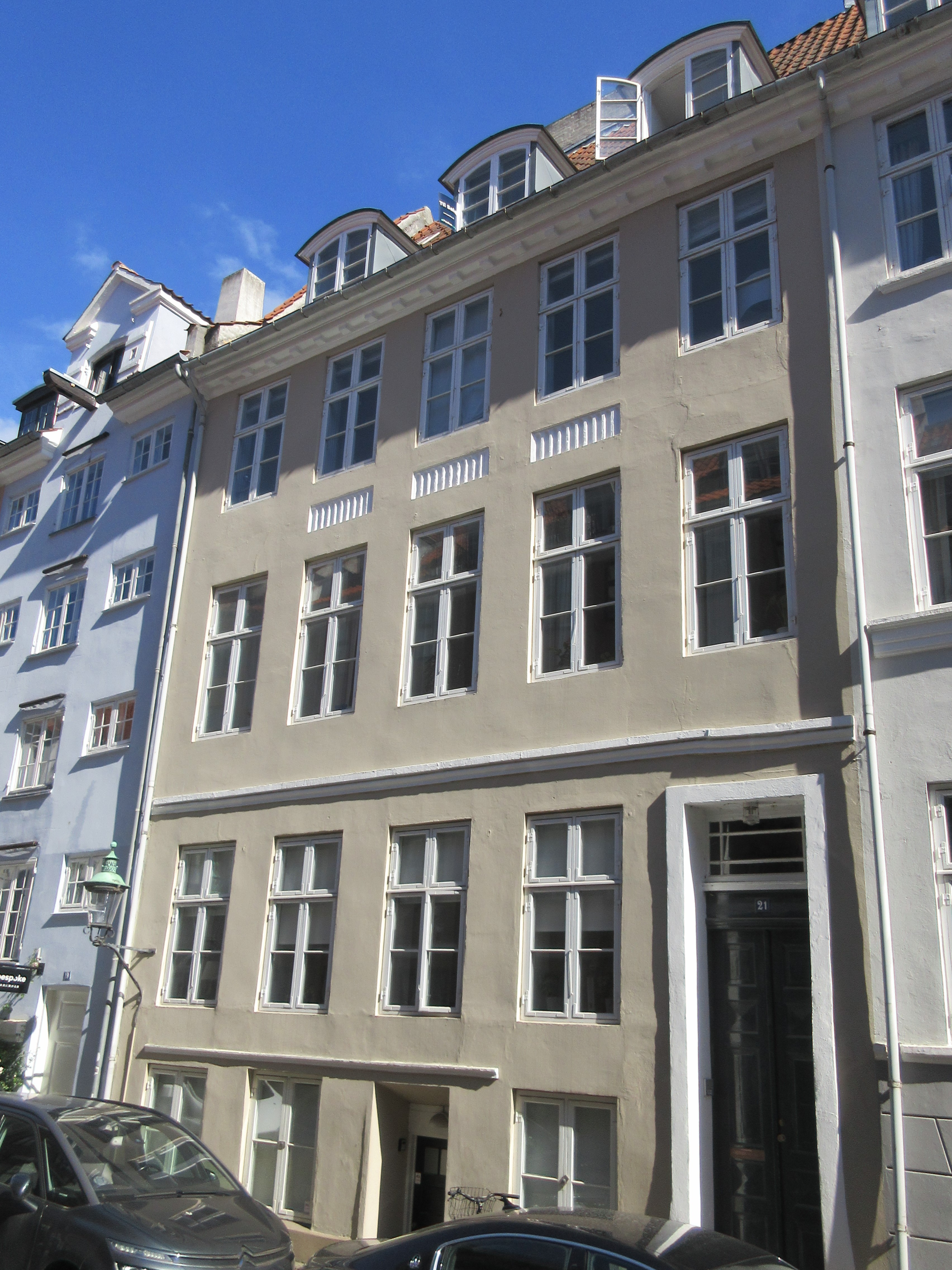
Dybensgade 21
