= Admiralgade 25 =

Listed building in Copenhagen

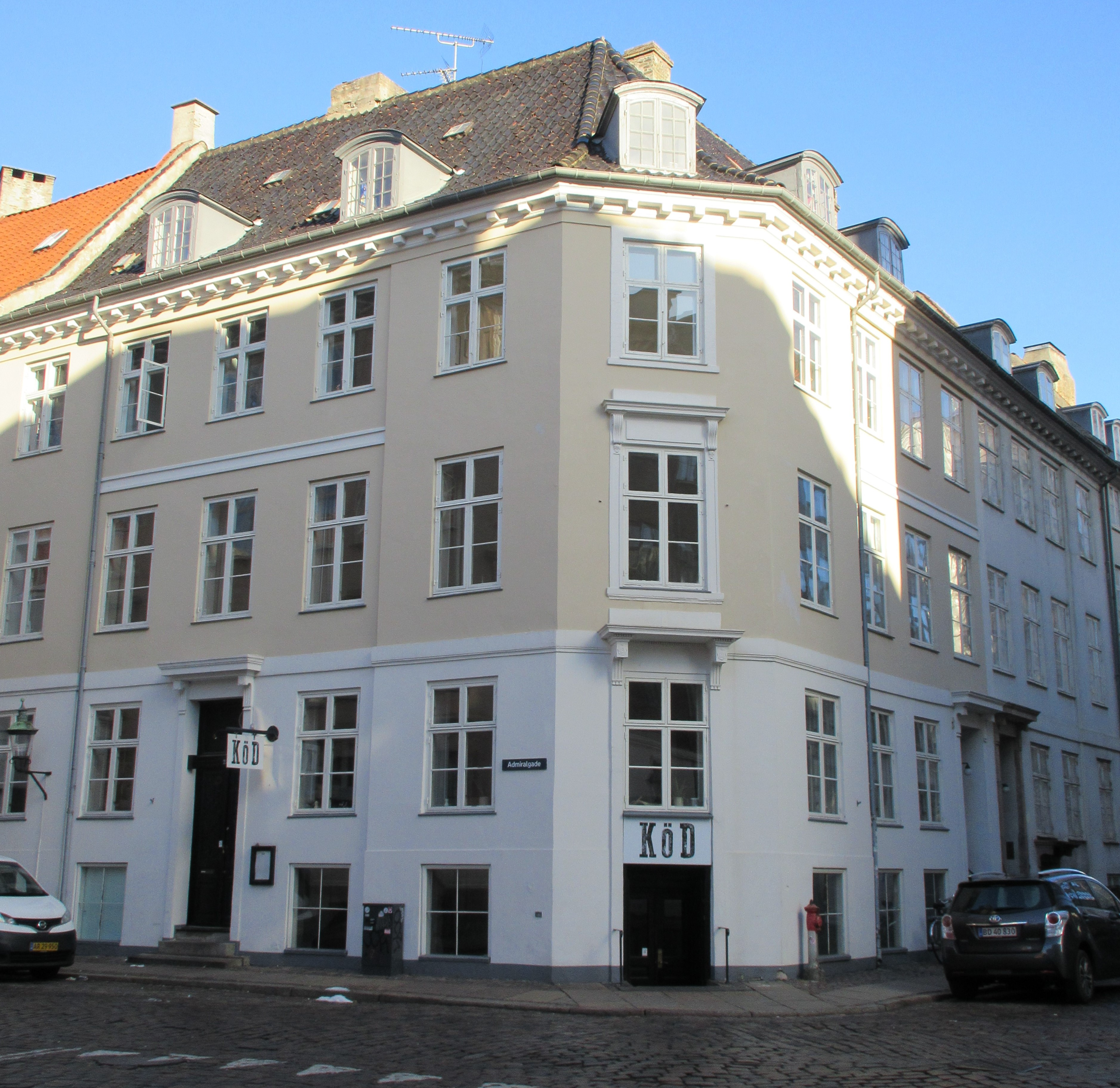
- Interactive map of the Admiralgade 25 area

General information
- Architectural style: Neoclassical
- Location: Copenhagen, Denmark
- Coordinates: 55°40′39.43″N 12°34′56.42″E
- Completed: 1798

Admiralgade 25/Laksegade 32 is a Neoclassical property situated at the corner of Admiralgade and Laksegade in central Copenhagen, Denmark. It was constructed for goldsmith Christian Nielsen Lindbach after his previous building on the site had been destroyed in the Copenhagen Fire of 1795. It was listed in the Danish registry of protected buildings and places in 1939.

== History ==
=== 17th and 18th centuries ===
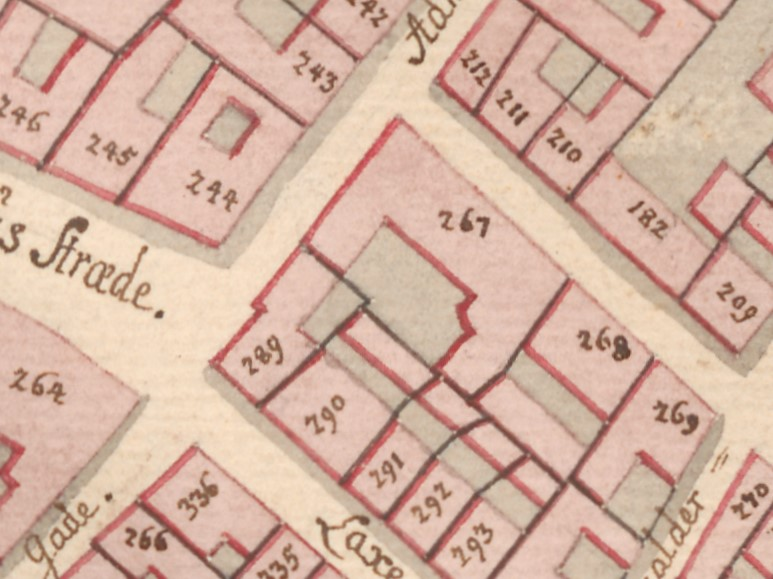
No. 289 seen on a detail from Christian Gedde's map of the East Quarter, 1757.

By 1689 the corner property, as No. 225 in the city's East Quarter (Øster Kvarter), was owned by a Justice Councillor (justitsråd) Muhle.

The property was later acquired by Hans Jørgen Hintz. In 1753, he sold it at auction to merchant (hørkræmmer) Christen Nielsen Waage (1723–1791). In the new cadastre of 1756, Waage's property was listed as No. 289. He had bought another property in the same year in Store Kongensgade (St. Ann's East Quarter, No. 238), where he lived from then on. In 1757, he was married to Hedevig Lynge (died 1758), who died in labour the following year.

On 19 December 1763, Waage sold the property to Nicolaj Palludan (1735–1770). On 23 June 1766 the property was acquired by Peter Winther. In Copenhagen's 1773 Street Directory, he is listed as a tea merchant. On 27 February 1775, Winther sold the property to barkeeper Rasmus Andersen Bruun.

On 17 March 1777, No. 289 was acquired by goldsmith Christen Nielsen Lindbach (1738–1815). At the time of the 1787 census, Lindbach resided in the building with his wife Johanne Dorothea (1740–1816), their six children (aged 11 to 20), the goldsmiths Peter Hansen (1763–1797) and Jens Christian Møller (1764–), two apprentices and one maid. Lindbach's workshop was located in the Admiralgade wing of the building. The property was also home to two more households. One of them consisted of a 50-year-old widow named Høyer, her nine-year-old son Widius, a maid and two lodgers. The last household consisted of just one person, Andreas Brask, a tea merchant.

Lindbach's building, together with most of the other buildings in the area, was destroyed in the Copenhagen Fire of 1795. Lindbach was able to buy the adjacent fire sites (No. 267 and No. 290) after the fire as well as another one at the corner of Ved Stranden and Voldhusgade. The corner lot No. 289 was expanded with a piece of the old No. 290 in Laksegade. The current building on the site was constructed in 1797–1798. On 2 September 1798, it was inspected for Kjøbenhavns Brandforsikring (Copenhagen Fire Insurance) by master carpenter J. C. Wahl (1759–1838) and master mason Poul Egerod and its value in connection was estimated at 7,800 rigsdaler. Laksegade 30 was also completed for Lindbach in 1798. Admiralgade 23 was completed for him in 1799, followed by Dybensgade 21 in 1800.

While the construction took place, Lindbach and his family found a temporary home at the corner of Torvegade and Dronningensgade in Christianshavn. In 1797 they had already moved back to one of the apartments in his new building at Ved Stranden 8 and did therefore not return to their old home at the corner of Admiralgade and Laksegade once the construction had been completed.

=== 19th century ===
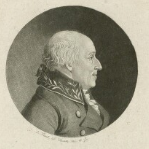
Friderich Gottlieb Sporon

At the time of the 1801 census, No. 289 was home to a total of five households. David Ben Moyel (1753–1831), a tobacco merchant, resided in the building with his wife Cathrine Elisabeth Hornbech (1766–1845), their two children and a maid. Friderich Gottlieb Sporon (1749–1811), a Supreme Court judge, resided in the building with his three children, two foster children and two maids. Søren Johansen Backe (born 1747), with title of "city undertaker" (stadsbedemand), resided in the building with his second wife Inger Schmidt (born 1753), his sister, her seven-year-old son, two girls "under opbringing" and a maid. The innkeeper Christian Nielsen Kiellerup (born 1760) and the widow Anne Christine Hansen (born 1761) occupied the two small dwellings in the basement. The latter lived there with three sailors and one soldier as lodgers.

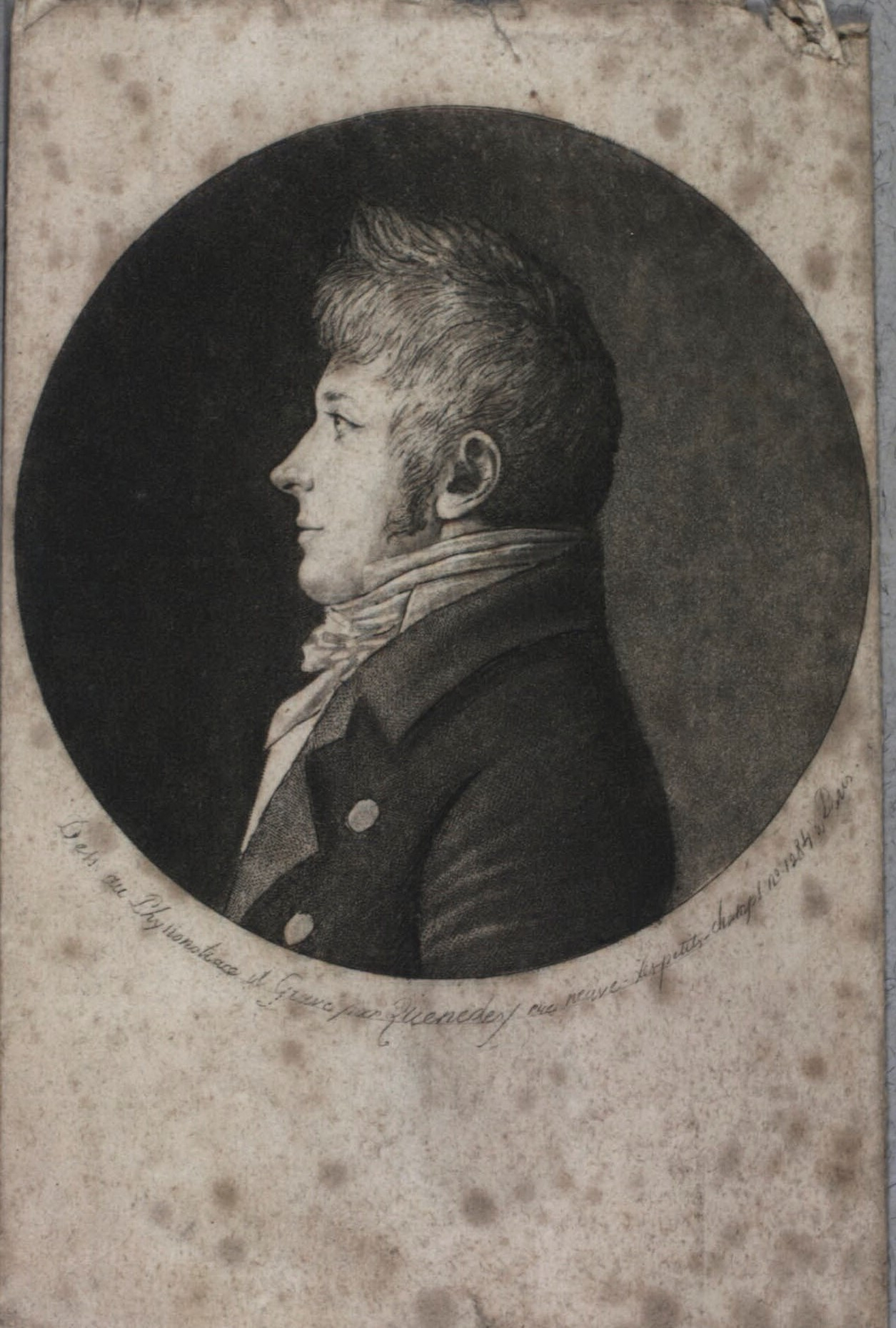
Johan Jacob Frølich

The property was listed in the new cadastre of 1806 as No. 191. In January 1810, Lindbach sold the property to surgeon Henrik Hieronnymus Bech and merchant Peter Friderich Løve. By 1812 Bech had acquired his partner's share of the property. In 1813, he sold the entire property to merchant S. W. Heilbuth, who sold it already on the same day to the brothers Heinrich Lorentz Frølich (1776–1873) and Johan Jacob Frølich (1781–1858). They traded in wine and colonial goods from a building on Østergade. They would later own the larger property at Store Kongensgade 81 for almost 50 years. Johan Jacob Frølich was the father of artist Lorenz Frølich.

In 1816, No. 101 was acquired by ship's captain Carl Peter Nissen. On his death in 1827, his widow Susanne Nielsen kept the building. Around 1856, she ceded it to their son Julius Nielsen.

Rudolph Bay (1791–1856), a composer, was among the residents in 1840. Thorvald Krak, Copenhagen's city engineer, resided in one of the apartments from 1875 to 1880.

The newly founded Københavns Grundejerforening (Copenhagen Home Owners' Association) purchased the building in 1882.

== Architecture ==
Admiralgade 25 is a corner building constructed with three storeys over a walk-out basement. It has a five-bay-long facade on Admiralgade and a four-bay-long facade on Laksegade. The chamfered corner bay was dictated for all corner buildings by Jørgen Henrich Rawert's and Peter Meyn's guidelines for the rebuilding of the city after the fire so that the fire department's long ladder companies could navigate the streets more easily. The three central bays towards Admiralgade and the three outer bays towards Laksegade are slightly recessed. The facades towards both streets are furthermore finished with a belt course above the ground floor and a modillioned cornice. The doorways in Admiralgade and Laksegade as well as the ground floor and first floor corner windows are all topped by Neoclassical hood moulds.

== Today ==
The property is owned today by E/F Dybensgade 21/Admiralgade 23.

== List of owners ==
- ? – 1687: Niels Bertelsen
- 1689–?: Muhle
- 1748?–1753: Hans Jørgen Hintz
- 1753–1763: Christen Nielsen Waage
- 1763–1766: Nicolaj Palludan
- 1766–1775: Peter Winther
- 1775–1777: Rasmus Andersen Bruun
- 1777–1795: Christen Nielsen Lindbach
- 1797–1810: Goldsmith Christen Nielsen Lindbach
- 1810–1813: Henrik Hieronnymus Bech and Peter Friderich Løve
- 1813: S.W. Heilbuth
- 1813–1816: Frølich
- 1816–1827: Carl Peter Nissen
- 1827–1856: Susanne Nissen
- 1856–1881: Julius Gotlieb Emil Nissen
- 1882 –: Kjøbenhavns Grundejerforening
