= Admiralgade 23 =

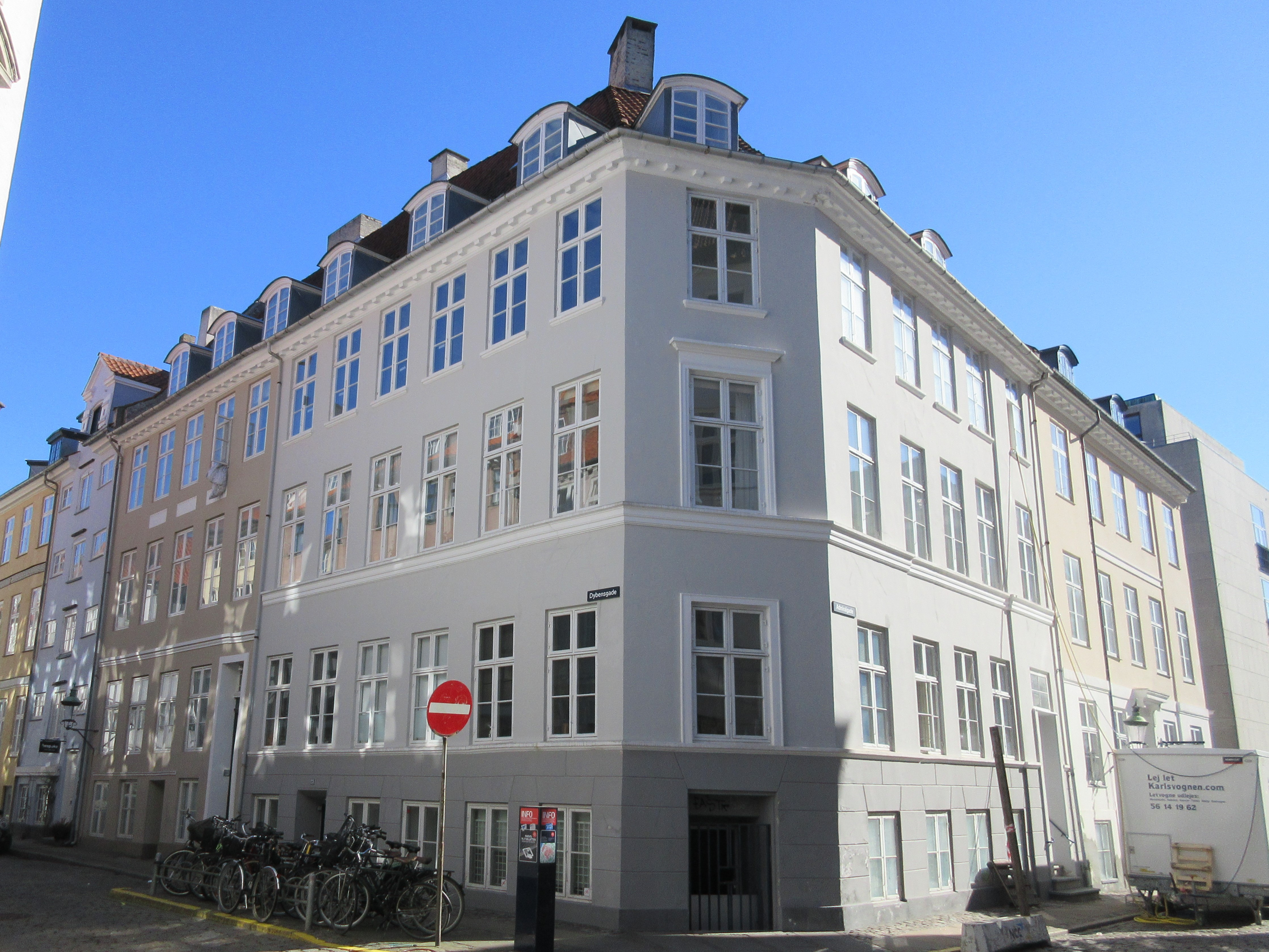

General information
- Architectural style: Neoclassical
- Location: Copenhagen, Denmark
- Coordinates: 55°40′40.12″N 12°34′56.68″E
- Completed: 1800

Admiralgade 23 is a Neoclassical property situated at the corner of Admiralgade and Dybensgade in central Copenhagen, Denmark. It was together with the adjacent building at Dybensgade 21 constructed for goldsmith Christian Nielsen Lindbach after the previous buildings at the site had been destroyed in the Copenhagen Fire of 1795. The two properties were merged into a single property in 1981. They were jointly listed in the Danish registry of protected buildings and places in 1945.

== History ==
=== Prior to the Fire of 1795 ===
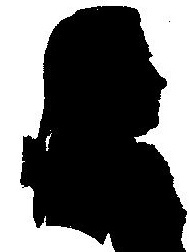
Andreas Bruun

The site was listed as No. 226 in Copenhagen's East Quarter (Øster Kvarter) in 1689 and was owned by tailor Lars Jensen. From around 1740, the building was occupied by military prosecutor general (overauditør) Andreas Bruun but was most likely owned by the Army. Bruun lived there with his first wife, Anna Maria Als (1717–1759). The property was still occupied by Bruun in 1756 as No. 267. In 1757, he purchased the country house Rolighed in Frederiksberg. In 1758, Bruun moved to a property at the corner of Pilestræde and Regnegade. In 1759, he was appointed Military Prosecutor General. His wife died in labour that same year.

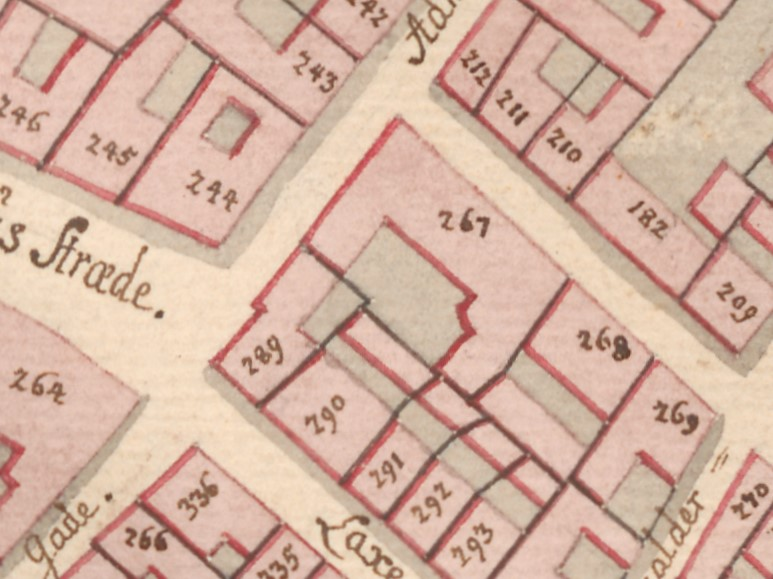
No. 267 seen on a detail from Christian Gedde's map of the East Quarter, 1757.

The next occupant of the house in Admiralgade was naval prosecutor Conrad Wohnsen (1722–1766). He lived there with his wife Mette Sophie Hohlmann –1784) and their daughter Hedvig Sophie. The family was moved to Kalundborg around 1654, where Wohnsen had been appointed as bailiff (byfoged).

The property in Admiralgade was on 10 December 1764 ceded to the Army's Pension Fund. (Den Landmilitære Pensions Kasse) but that same day sold to Leonhardt Serin (1716 – c.1800). Serin, a manufacturer of ribbons and stockings, was originally from Switzerland. He moved in with his wife Hedrine Clausing (1740 – ca.1768) and their five children.

The property, at the time of the 1787 census, was home to three households comprising a total of 25 people. Serin was now residing in the building with his second wife Augusta Juliane Heiberg (1766–1796) and the five children from his first marriage. His household also comprised four maids and four lodgers. Another household consisted of wine merchant and innkeeper Niels Juul (1720–1788) with family. He also hosted the Norwegian Society. The third household consisted of concierge Niels Christiansen, his wife Ane Nielsdatter, their 15-year-old daughter and a maid.

=== Christen Nielsen Lindbach, 1796–1799 ===
Together with the rest of the neighborhood, the property was destroyed in the Copenhagen Fire of 1795. After the fire the lot was acquired by the goldsmith Christen Nielsen Lindbach. He was already the owner of the adjacent property at the corner of Admiralgade and Laksegade where both his home and workshop had been located. He divided No. 267 into No. 267 A and No. 267 B and used them for the construction of two separate properties. He also purchased a lot at the corner of Ved Stranden and Boldhusgade and used it for the construction of a house for his own use.

=== Admiralgade, 1800–1881 ===
The corner building (No. 267A) went under construction in late 1799 and the completed building was inspected by master carpenter J. C. Wahl (1759–1838) and master mason Poul Egerod on 21 November 1800. The building contained one high-end four-room apartment on each of the four upper floors. The basement contained room for two taverns with associated dwellings for the proprietors. The yard featured two 3.7 m (12 ft) tall firewalls, a half-timbered lavatory building and a water pump.

At the time of the 1801 census, the building was home to a total of 19 people. The retired military officer and former Danish consul in India Frederik Schffalitzky de Mucadell (1755–1814) resided with his wife, three children and a maid in one of the apartments. The other tenants were a restaurateur, a master tailor and a beer vendor (øltapper) with their respective families and lodgers.

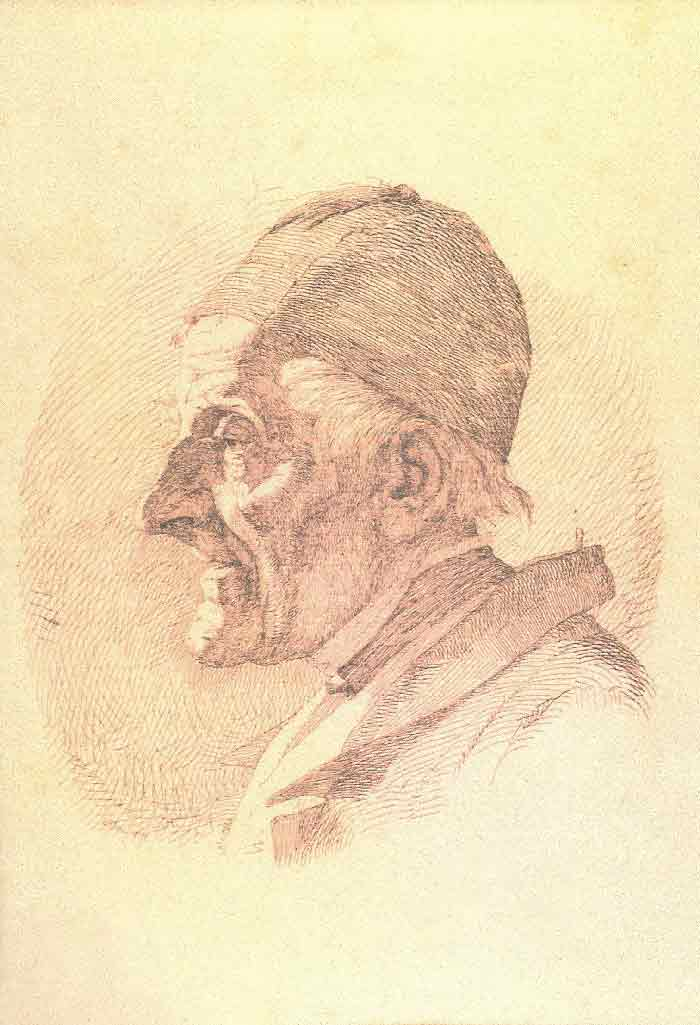
Lauritz Eskildsen (1787–1873)

The property was in the new cadastre of 1806 listed as No. 190. In July 1807, Lindbach sold it to Dorothea Eleonora Olsen. In January 1814, it was acquired by businessman (varermægler) Hans Heinrich Eskildsen and his brother naval quartermaster Lauritz Eskildsen (1787–1873). The actor Carl Winsløw (1796–1834) was among the tenants in 1828–1829. Hans Heinrich Eskildsen resided in the building until the 1840s but kept it longer than that. In 1855, he sold it to physician Carl Emil Tøttrup (1816–). In 1858, Tøttrup, on moving to Frederiksberg, sold the house in Admiralgade to merchant (urtekræmmer) Carl Jensen and Theodor Christensen.

=== Dybensgade 21, 1800–1981 ===
The building at No. 267B went under construction in 1799 and was inspected by master carpenter J. C. Wahl (1759–1838) and master mason Poul Egerod on 21 November 1800. The property was listed as No. 189 in the new cadastre of 1806. In 1807, Lindbach sold it to distiller Stephan Hønggaard (1756–1808). He lived there with his wife Sophie Frøling. Hønggaard died from dropsy in 1808. Their 20-year-old son had drowned earlier the same year at Kalvebod Beach. In July 1809, Sophie Hønggaard had to sell the property to assistant surgeon Hans Heinrich Søht (1764 – c. 1833) and his wife Laurentze Euphrosyne Berhardine Tietchen (1770–1867).

The property, at the time of the 1840 census, was home to a total of 17 people distributed in four households. The now 64-year-old owner, Laurentze Euphrosyne Søht, resided on the second floor. Christian Sivertsen, a skipper, resided with his wife and two children in the basement. Aurora Celindiana Wingler (1786–), widow of a customs officer, resided with her two children on the ground floor. They shared it with two lodgers, theatre student Christian Lunov Laasby Ferslew (c. 1817–) and law student Søren Parmo Ferslew (1819–1883), who were brothers. Another widow, Ursula Elisabeth Rottbøll, the third wife of provost in Aalborg Gerhard Pedersen Tetens (1760–1832), resided with her maid Karen Nielsen on the first floor. The property was acquired by master tailor Hans Peter Ørfeldt (1797–) in 1844. He resided there with his second wife Lovise Betty Kreidt (1807–). She owned the property as a widow until 1874.

== Architecture ==
The corner building (Admiralgade 23) is constructed with three storeys over a walk-out basement. The facade towards both streets is five bays long. The chamfered corner bay was dictated for all corner buildings by Jørgen Henrich Rawert's and Peter Meyn's guidelines for the rebuilding of the city after the fire so that the fire department's long ladder companies could navigate the streets more easily.

Dybensgade 21 is also constructed with three storeys over a walk-out basement and is five bays wide. A three-bay perpendicular side wing extends from the rear side of the building. The property was added to the Danish registry of protected buildings and places in 1945.

== Today ==
The two properties were merged into a single property in 1981. They were at the same time subject to a renovation. It has been owned by E/F Dybensgade 21/Admiralgade 23 since 1 February 1983 and consists of 10 condominiums.
