= Boldhusgade =

Street in Copenhagen, Denmark

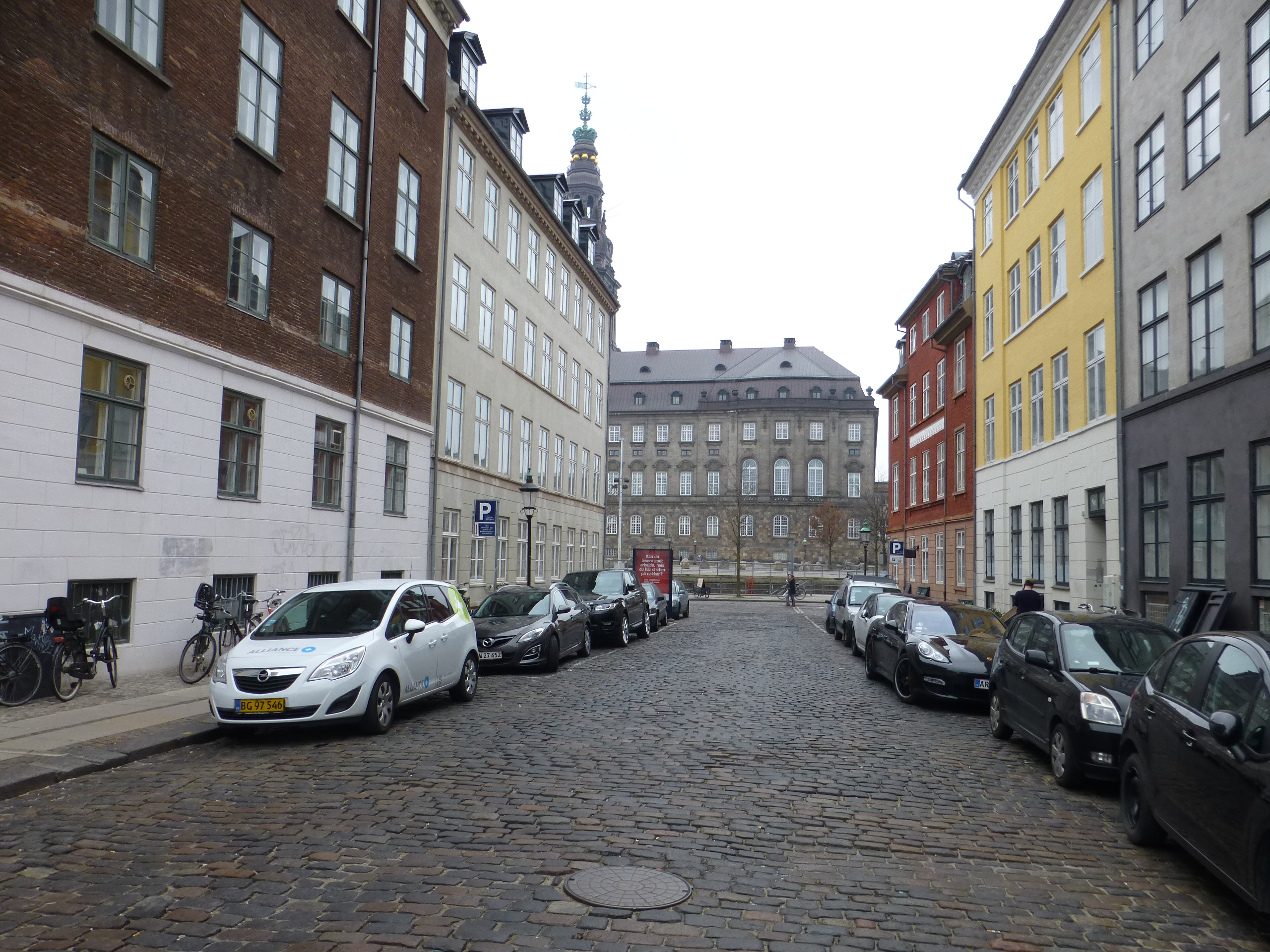
- Interactive map of Boldhusgade
- Length: 53 m (174 ft)
- Location: Copenhagen, Denmark
- Quarter: Indre By
- Postal code: 1062
- Nearest metro station: Gammel Strand
- Coordinates: 55°40′38.3″N 12°34′54.6″E
- Southwest end: Ved Stranden
- Northeast end: Admiralgade

Boldhusgade (lit. "Ball House Street) is a short, cobbled street in the Old Town of Copenhagen, Denmark. It runs from Ved Stranden in the southwest to Admiralgade in the northeast from where it continues as Laksegade.

== History ==
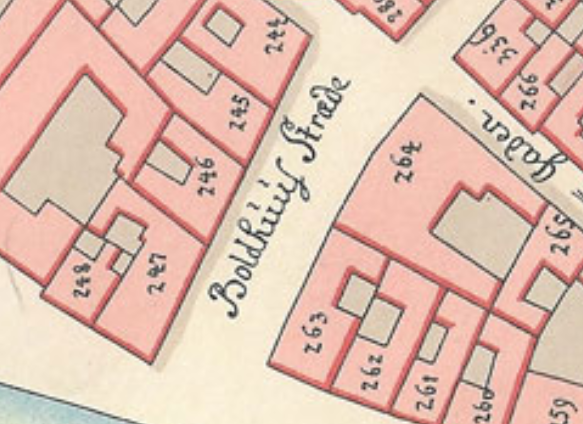
Boldhusgade seen in a detail from Gedde's map of the East Quarter, 1757

The street was original called Adelstredet. The 20-year-old king Christian IV constructed a so-called ball house on the south side of the street in 1597. It was used for ball play and other recreational activities.

The area was then part of Bremerholm. Skipperboderne, a development of naval barracks, was built close to the ball house in circa 1614. A new ball house was then built on Slotsholmen, but the old one is still mentioned in the middle of the century, and it is therefore unclear when it was demolished. Boldhusgade was created in 1624. The street was completely destroyed in the Copenhagen Fire of 1795.

== Buildings and residents ==
All the buildings in the street were built in the years just after the Copenhagen Fire of 1795, and have all been listed on the Danish registry of protected buildings and places.

The north west side of the street (even numbers) consists of four properties. Studenterforeningen was for a while based at No. 2 in the first half of the 19th century. It was later home to a theatre, Boldhus Teatret.

The southeast side of the street consists of just two properties. Boldhusgade 1/Admiralgade 28 dates from 1798 to 1799 and was built by Frantz Phillip Lange (1756–1805) and Lauritz Thrane (1757–1809). The high cellar and ground floor are dressed while the upper floors stand in exposed, red brick. Ved Stranden 8, with nine bays towards Boldhusgade, was built for the goldsmith Christian Nielsen Lindbach in 1796–1797.

== Gallery ==
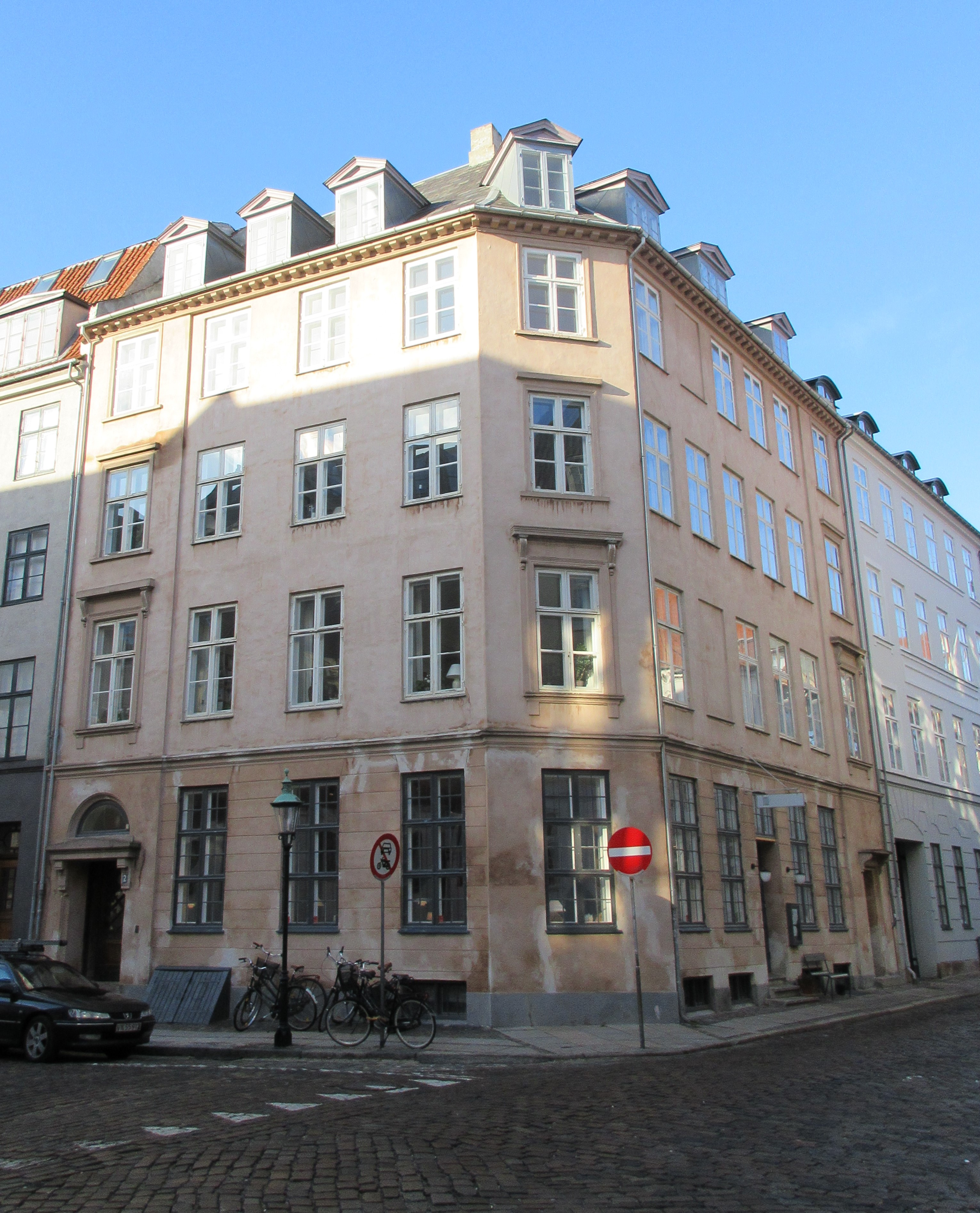
No. 2

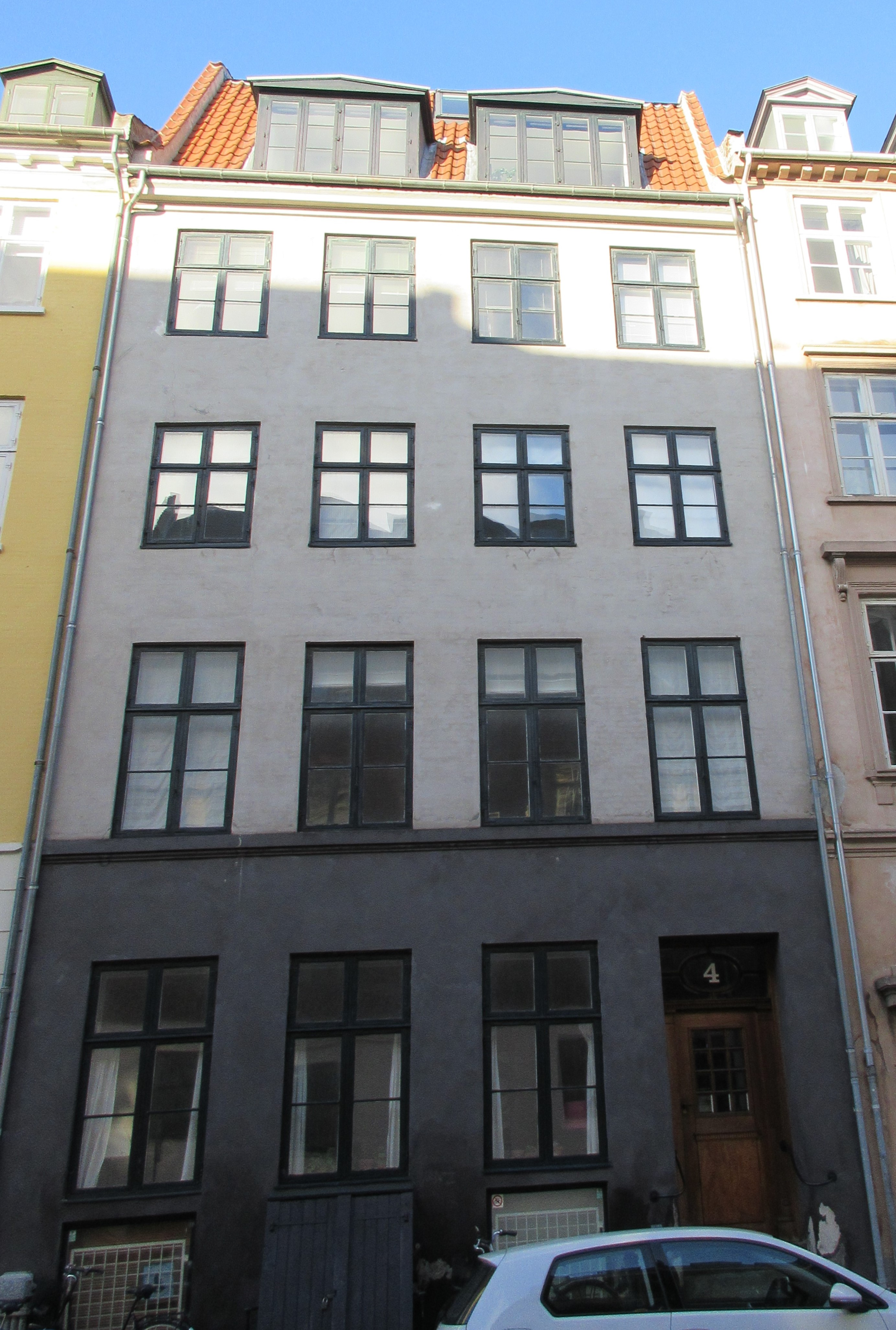
No. 4

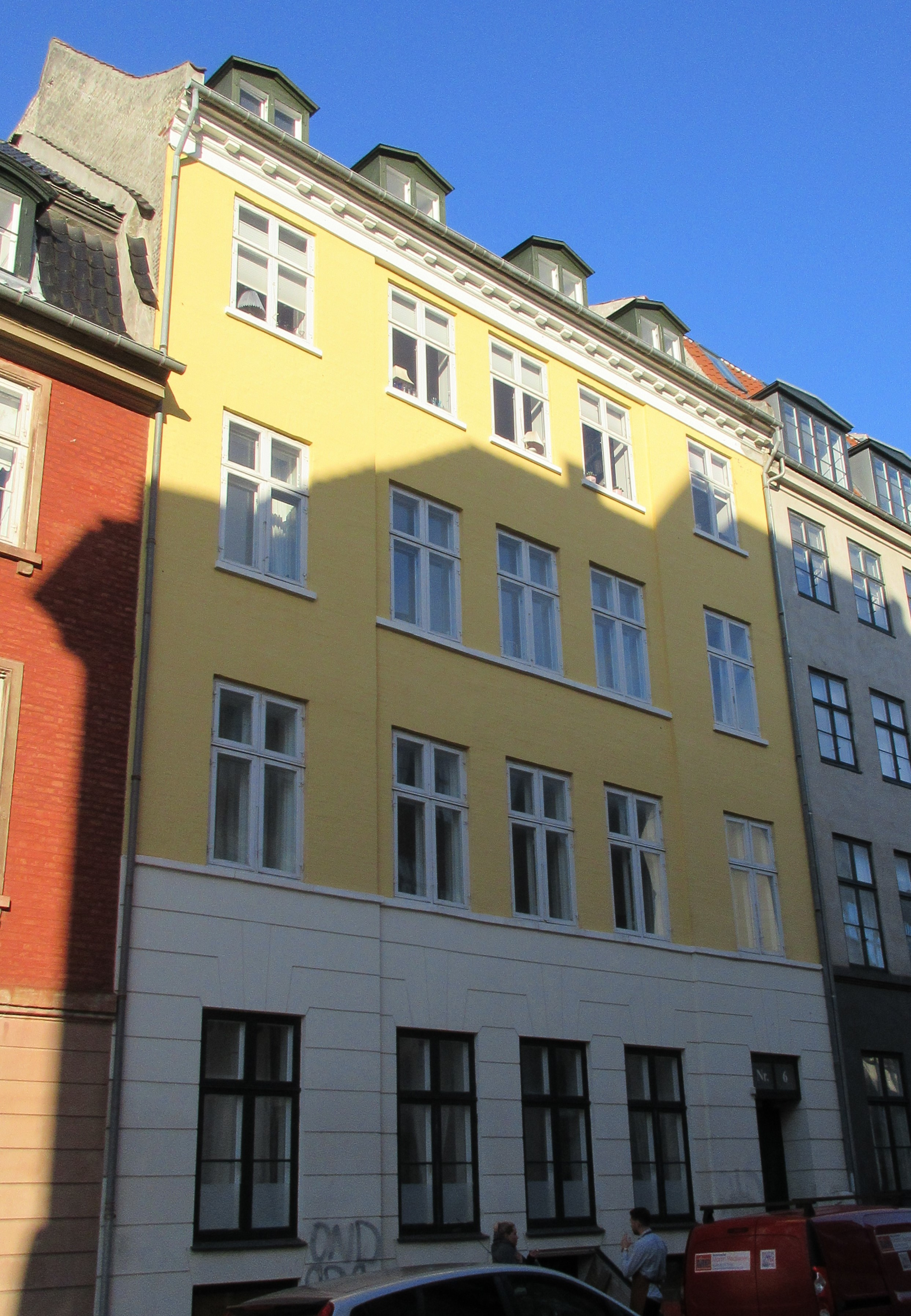
No. 6

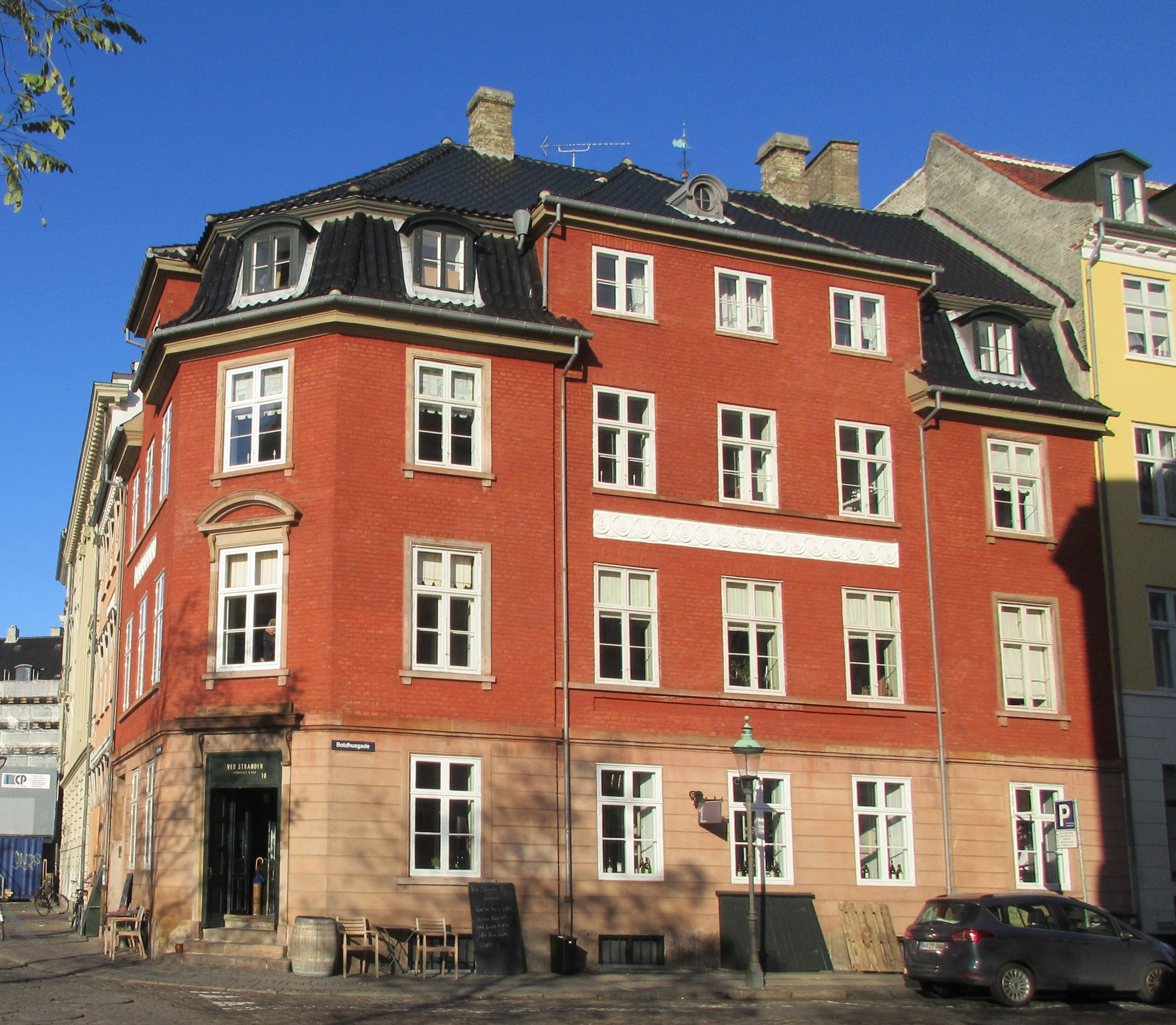
Sundorph House

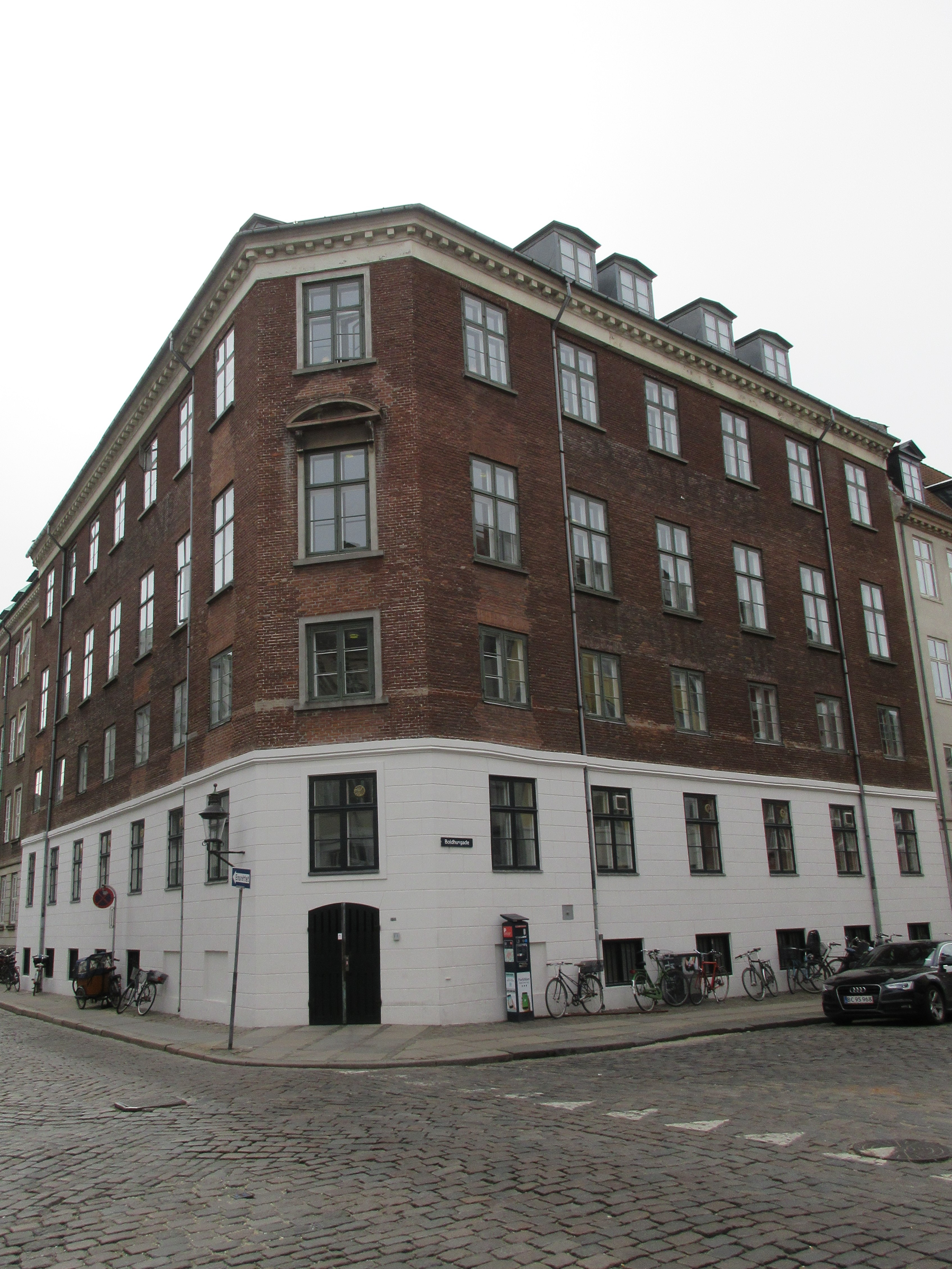
No. 1 (Admiralgade 28)

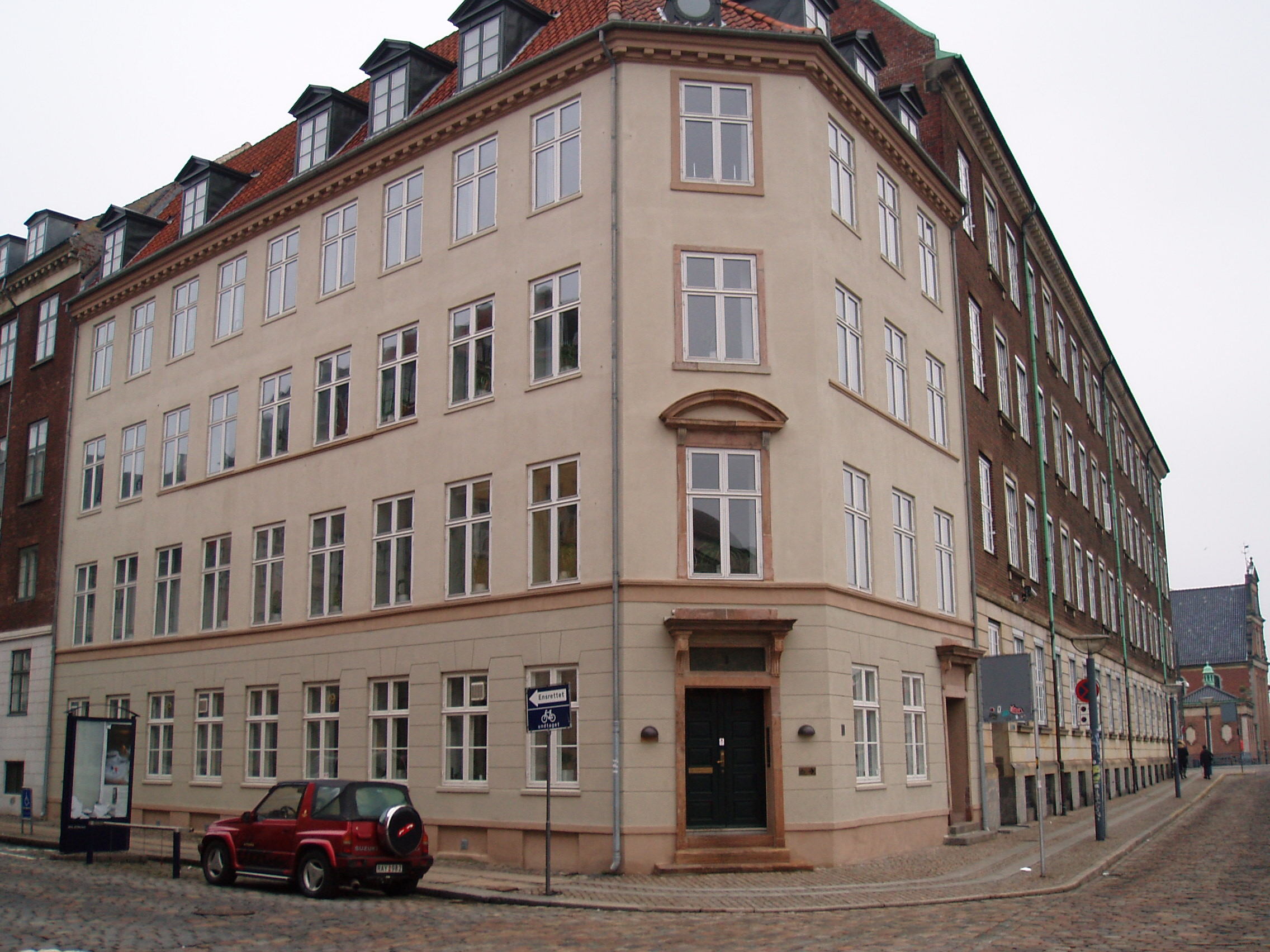
Ved Stranden 8
