= Admiralgården =

Building in Copenhagen, Denmark

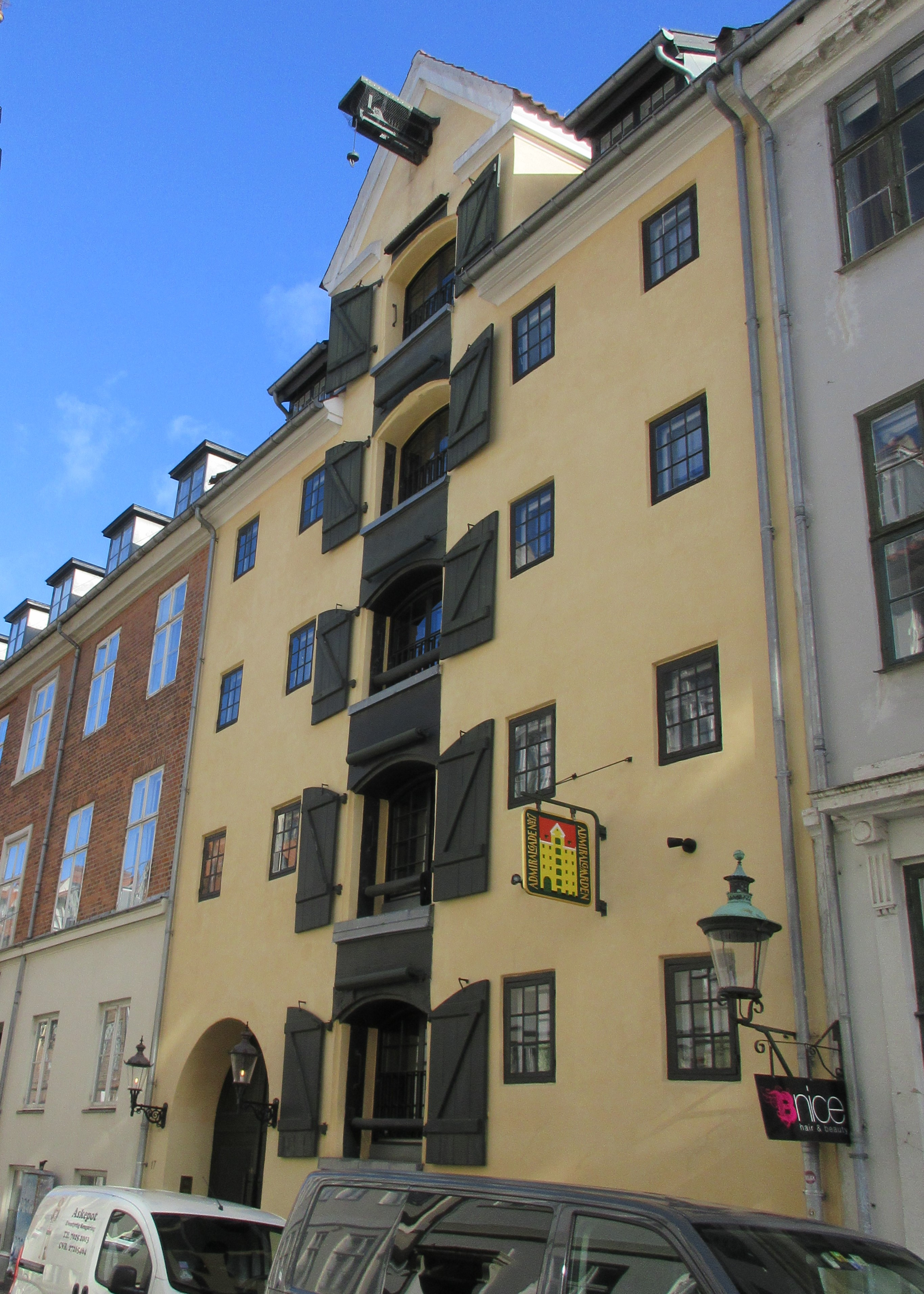

General information
- Location: Admiralgade 17; Copenhagen, Denmark
- Coordinates: 55°40′40.97″N 12°34′54.81″E
- Completed: 1797
- Owner: Metorion

Admiralgården is a converted warehouse located at Admiralgade 17 in central Copenhagen, Denmark. It was built for the same company as the nearby Sundorph House (Ved Stranden 10) and was originally used for storing tea. It was listed on the Danish registry of protected buildings and places by the Danish Heritage Agency on 5 March 1945, and was owned by Bent Fabricius-Bjerre until 2020 through the real estate company Metorion.

== History ==
=== Site history, 1689–1805 ===
The site was formerly made up of two smaller properties. The northern one was listed in Copenhagen's first cadastre of 1689 as No. 1762 in East Quarter and then belonged to tailor Johan Christoffer. The southern property was listed as No. 173 and belonged to magister Statius Koch.

The two properties were listed in the new cadastre of 1756 as No. 214 (old No. 182) and No. 215 (old No. 183) in the East Quarter, both owned by baker Thomas Johansen Seyer.

Prior to 1787, the property was acquired by baker Peder Jørgensen. He resided in the building with his wife Birgithe Elisabeth Jørgensen, their one-year-old son Christian, his brother Johan Henrich Henningsen, five bakers, a caretaker, a wet nurse and two maids.

=== Sundorph and the new building ===
The buildings on the site were destroyed in the Copenhagen Fire of 1795, together with most of the other buildings in the area. The present warehouse on the site was constructed in 1797 for the widow Mette Christine Sundorph. She was the owner of Mette Christine sal. Sundorphs Enke & Co. ("Metta Christine late Sundorph's Widow & Co.), a company which she had taken over after her second husband's death in 1794. Its premises at the corner of Ved Stranden and Voldhusgade had been destroyed in the Copenhagen Fire of 1795. It therefore had to be operated from intermistic premises on Slotsholmen until the new Sundorph House at Ved Stranden 10 and the warehouse in Admiralgade were completed in 1797.

Mette Christine Sundorph's property in Admiralgade was listed in the new cadastre of 1806 as No. 162. It was still owned by Sundorph at that time.

=== 1840–1900 ===
The property was initially listed as Admiralgade 3 when house numbering by street was introduced in 1859 as a supplement to the old cadastral numbers by quarter. In 1894, when the buildings in Admiralgade were numbered in the opposite direction, it was listed as Admiralgade 17.

=== 20th century ===
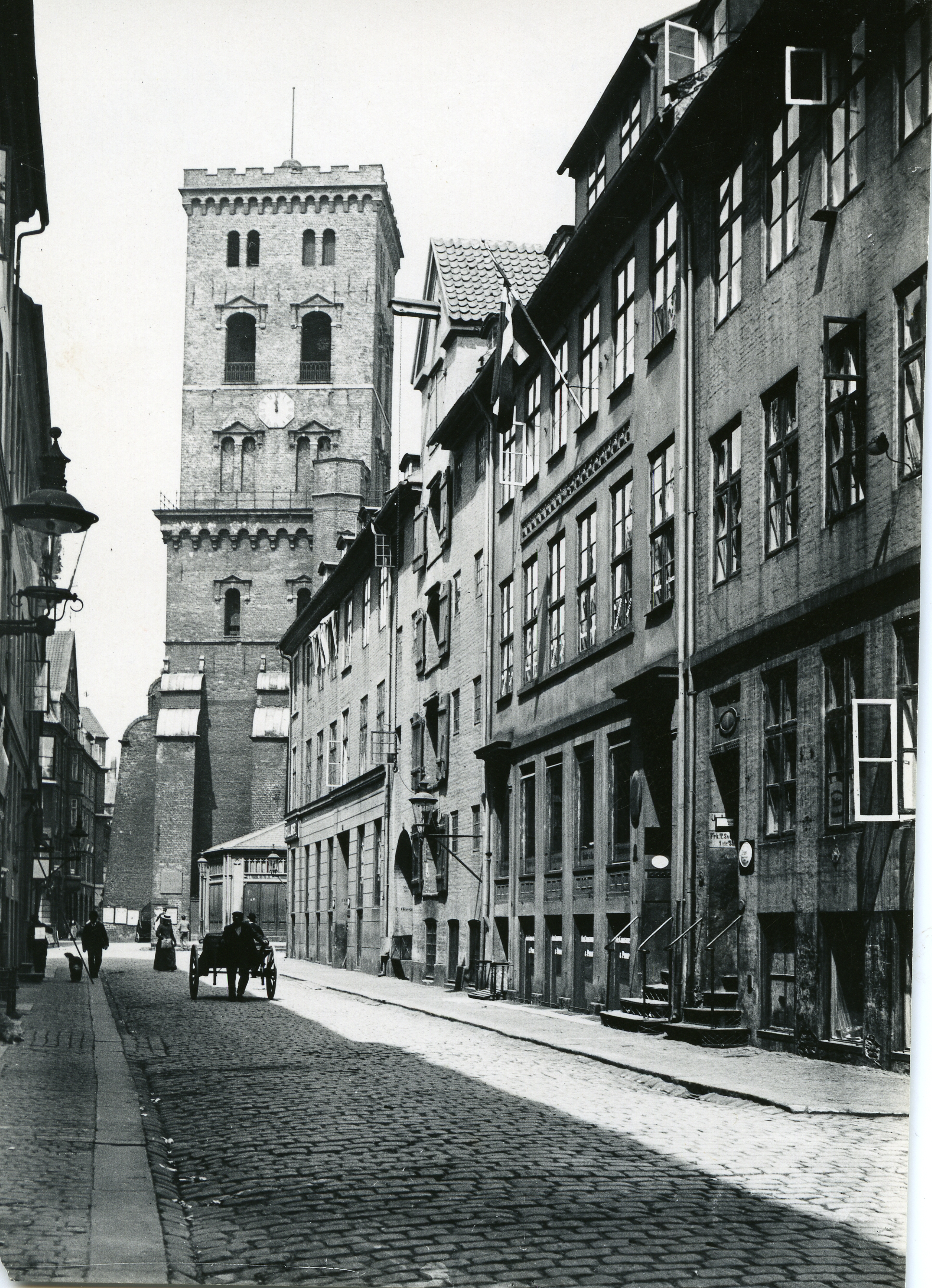
Admiralgården by Fritz Theodor Benzen in the 1900s

The building was listed on the Danish registry of protected buildings and places by the Danish Heritage Agency on 5 March 1945. It was renovated under supervision of the architect Kay Kørbing (born 1915) in 1969–1970. It was acquired by Bent Fabricius-Bjerre in 1997, and was then subject to another refurbishment.

== Architecture ==
The four-storey warehouse has a central row of large openings with wooden shutters tipped by a tall dormer with the remains of a hoist. To the rear is a three-storey, one-bay side wing and a three-storey, three-bay warehouse which both date from between 1797 and 1806.

== Today ==
The building is owned by Fabricius-Bjerre's two sons through the real estate company Metorion. It contains a mixture of offices and apartments.
