= Laksegade =

Street in Copenhagen, Denmark

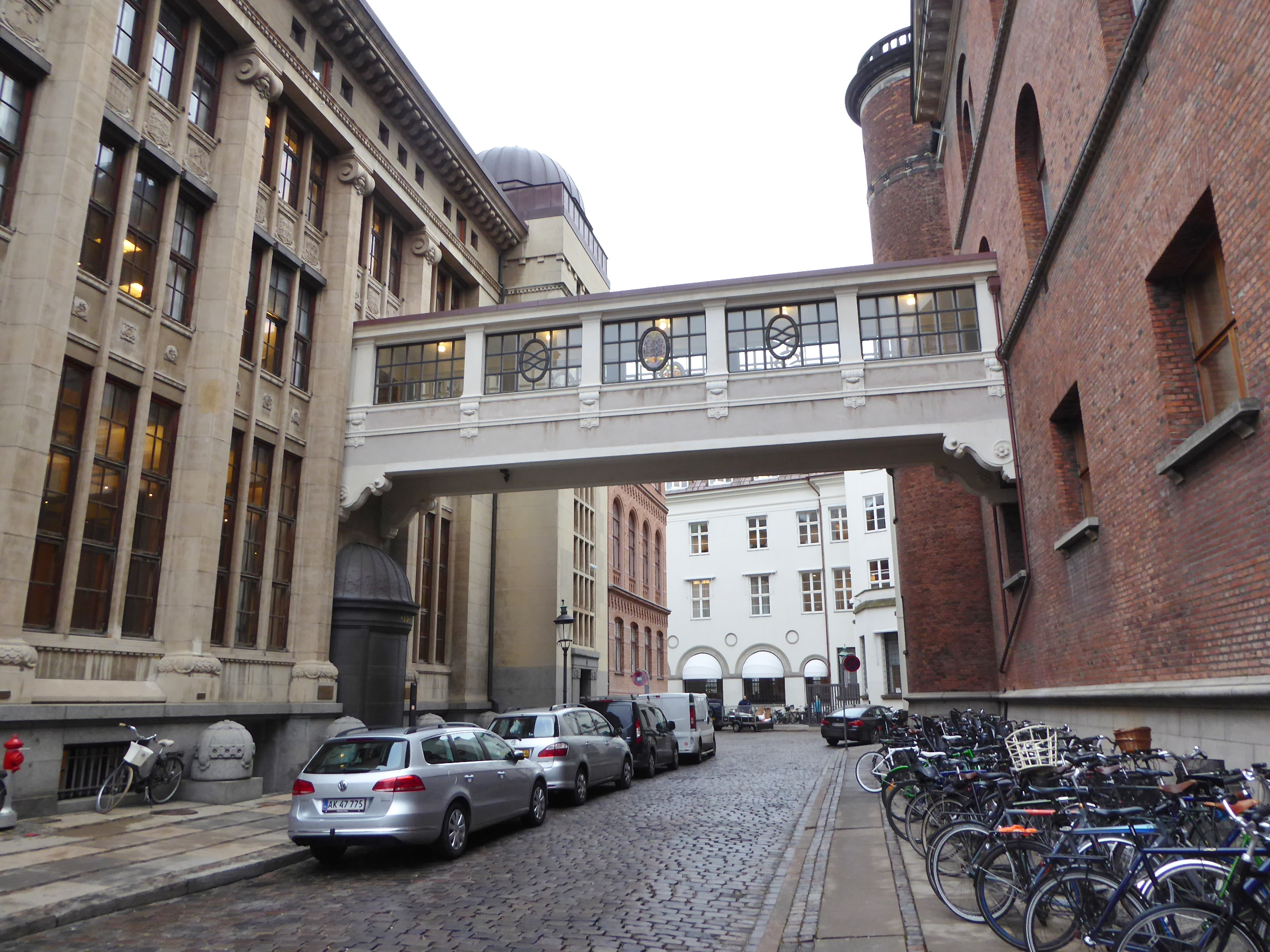
- A view down Laksegade
- Interactive map of Laksegade
- Length: 250 m (820 ft)
- Location: Copenhagen, Denmark
- Quarter: City centre
- Postal code: 1063
- Nearest metro station: Kongens Nytorv
- Coordinates: 55°40′40.6″N 12°35′02.4″E
- Northwast end: Kongens Nytorv
- Southwest end: Admiralgade

Laksegade is a street in central Copenhagen, Denmark. It runs from Kongens Nytorv in the northeast to Admiralgade in the southwest from where it continues as Boldhusgade to Ved Stranden.

== History ==
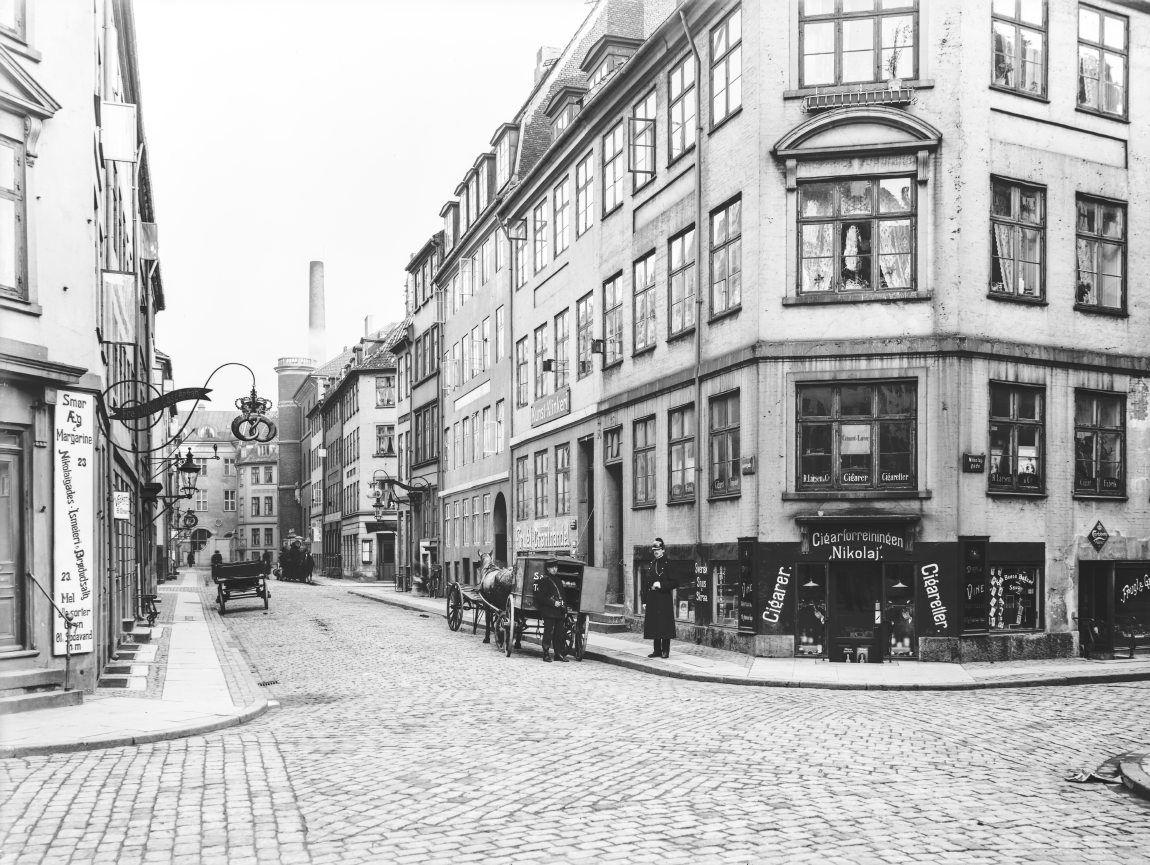
Laksegade seen from Nikolaigade on a photograph by Johannes Hauerslev

A shallow-watered area known as Dybet was in the Middle Ages located where Laksegade runs today. The water separated Zealand from the small isle of Bremerholm where the Royal Dockyard was then located. Dybet was reclaimed and initially the site of the royal vegetable garden.

The royal vegetable garden was moved to Kongens Have when the area was built over with terraced housing for naval officers and personnel of Bremerholm in circa 1620. The houses were initially known as Skipperhusene but became known as Gammelboder (Old Houses) when Nyboder (New Houses) was constructed a few decades later. The streets in the area had a grid-like layout and were named after fish species and other sea creatures: Laksegade, Ulkegade, Størestræde, Delfingade and Hummergade. The neighborhood was completely destroyed in the Copenhagen Fire of 1795.

The name Laksegade only referred to the southwestern section of the street from Admiralgade to Bremerholm (Ulkegade). The eastern part of the street (No. 1-11 and No. 2-10) was until 1877 known as Reverensgade (Bow Street). The name was most likely a reference to its "bending" shape.

Following an alleged paranormal incident in 1826, the street has come to lend its name to the modern Danish expression Fanden er løs i Laksegade meaning "There is the Devil to pay on Salmon Street" (or, more literally, "The Devil is on the loose on Salmon Street").

== Notable buildings and residents ==
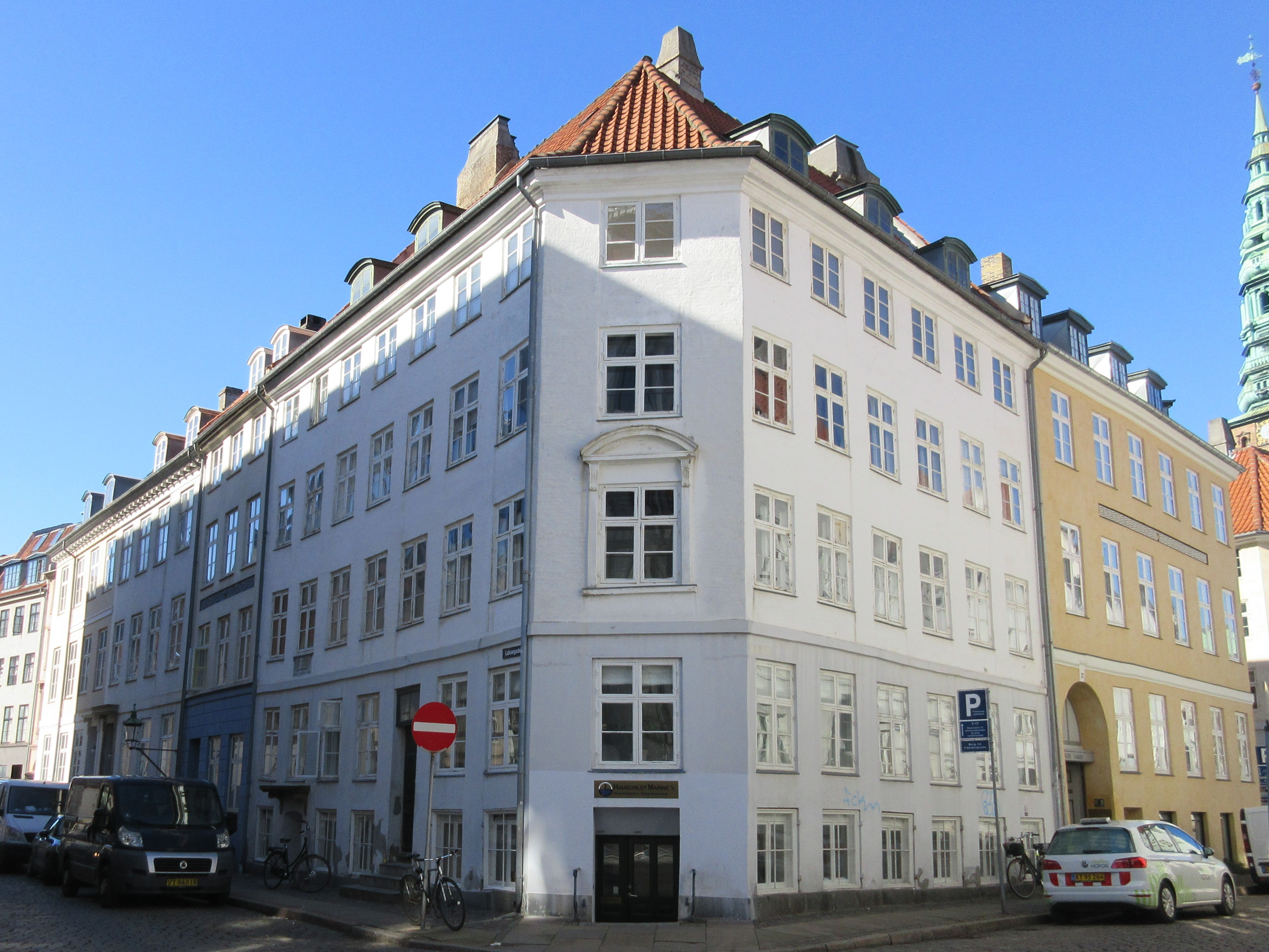
Laksegade 26

A number of buildings along the street date from the years immediately after the Great Fire of 1795, including No. 26 and No. 30 which have both been listed in the Danish registry of protected buildings and places.

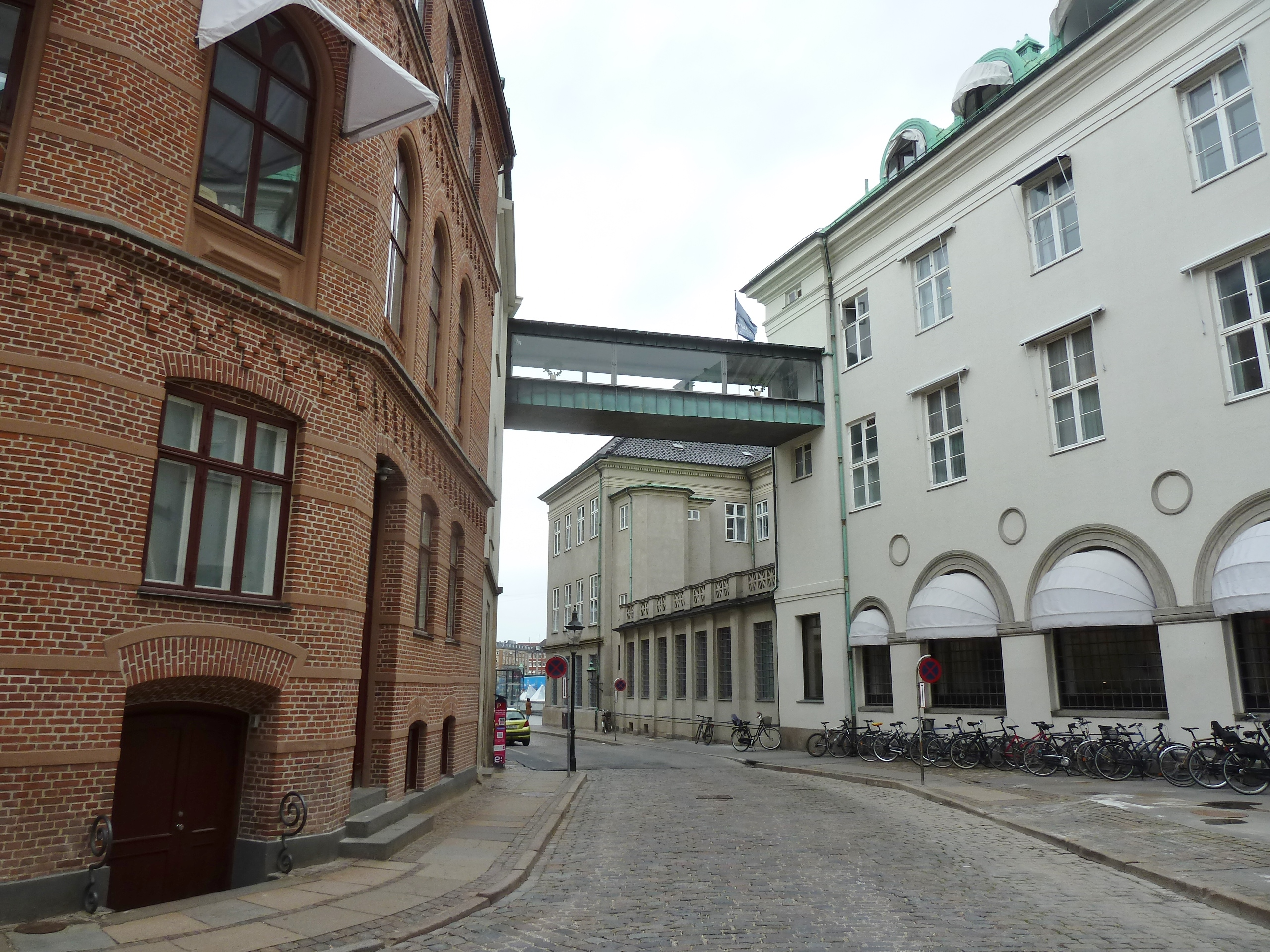
Laksegade with one of the two skyways

The first part of the street passes the Erichsen Mansion whose principal facade faces Kongens Nytorv. The adjacent facade is the rear side of the three-winged office building at Holmens Kanal 4. It was built for Kjøbenhavns Handelsbank to design by Frederik Levy in 1908–1910. Laksegade 7, the rear side of Holmens Kanal 1, is from 1830.

The building with the rounded corner at Laksegade 4/Vingårdstræde 3 is from 1927 to 1928 and was designed by Carl Brummer. A skyway connects it to a numberless, gabled building on the other side of the street.

== Transport ==
The Kongens Nytorv metro station is located at the eastern end of the street. It is served by M1, M2 and M3.
