= Ved Stranden 8 =

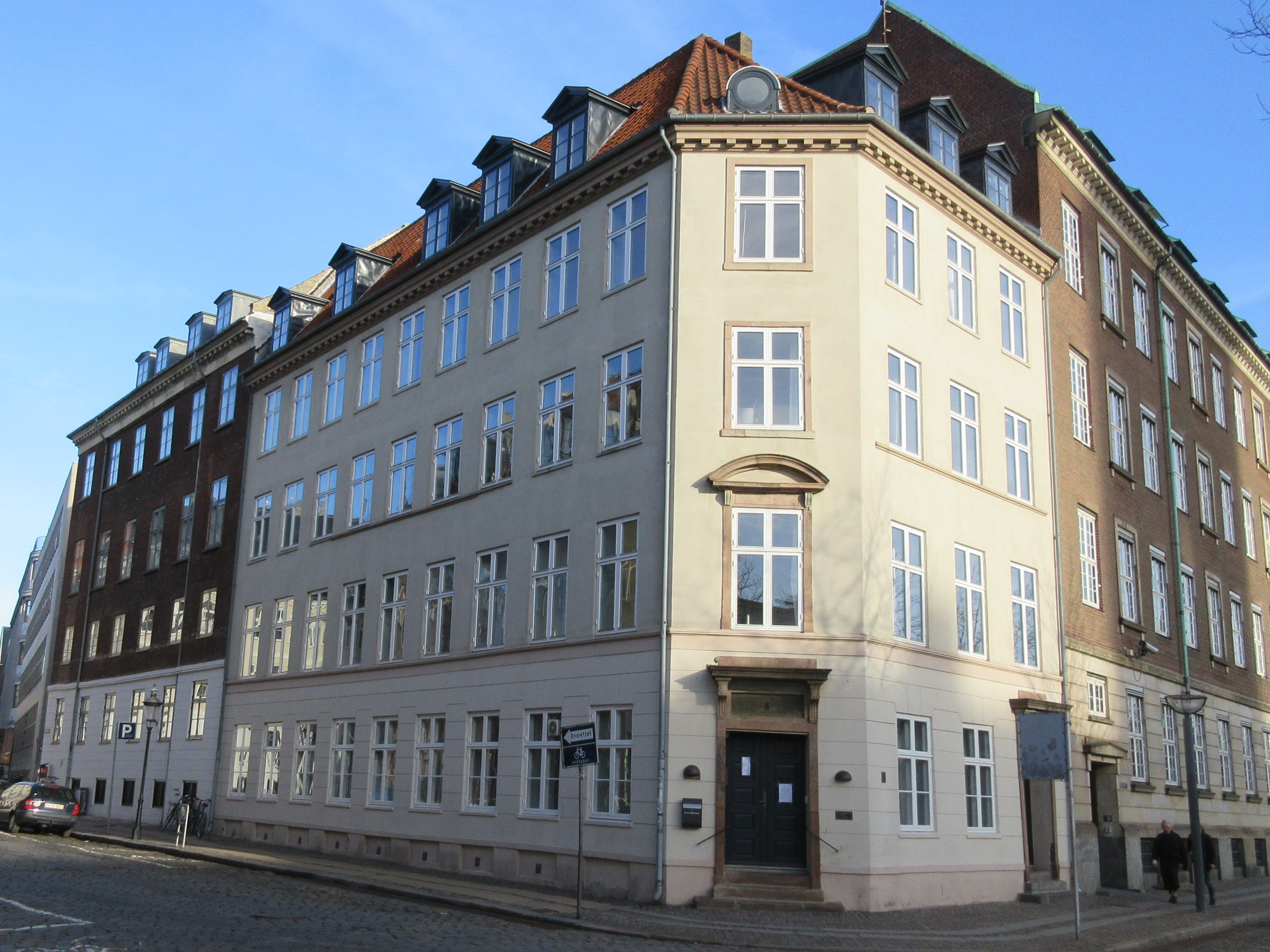
- Interactive map of the Ved Stranden 8 area

General information
- Architectural style: Neoclassical
- Location: Copenhagen, Denmark
- Coordinates: 55°40′37.92″N 12°34′54.84″E
- Completed: 1797

Ved Stranden 8 is a Neoclassical property located at the corner of Ved Stranden (No, 8) and Boldhusgade (No. 3), opposite Christiansborg Palace, in central Copenhagen, Denmark. The building was listed on the Danish registry of protected buildings and places in 1932.

== History ==
=== Before the fire of 1795 ===
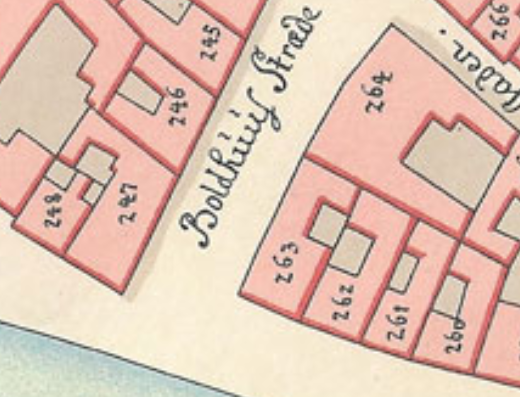
No. 263 seen in a detail from Christian Gedde's map of the East Quarter, 1757

The property was in 1689 owned by tobacco-maker Johan Bramsted. It was in the 1720s acquired by porcelain merchant Peter Decker (1697-1727). His widow Cathrine Agatha Bredahl (1701-1778) kept the property after her husband's death at age 30 in 1728. Their daughter Hendrine Christine (1727-1762) was in 1747 married to the naval officer Conrad von Schindel (1715-1794).

The property was later purchased by court sculptor Johann Friedrich Hännel (1710-1755). He was originally from Meissen but had settled in Denmark in 1731. He married Elisabeth Manndorff (1728-1780), a daughter of basket-maker Carl from Lübeck Jacob Mandorff (1695-1755) and his wife Catrina, on 21 January 1845 in St. Peter's Church. They had the daughters Susanne Elisabeth (1754-) and Anne Maria (1756 – c. 1790). His widow was on 28 January 1762 for the second time married to his former employee Johann Gottfried Grund. Elisabeth Manndorff Grund died from "oinflamation" in 1780. Grund was at the time of the 1787 census still living in the house at Ved Stranden together with their two children and the daughter Susanne Elisabet from his wife's first marriage.

=== The current building ===
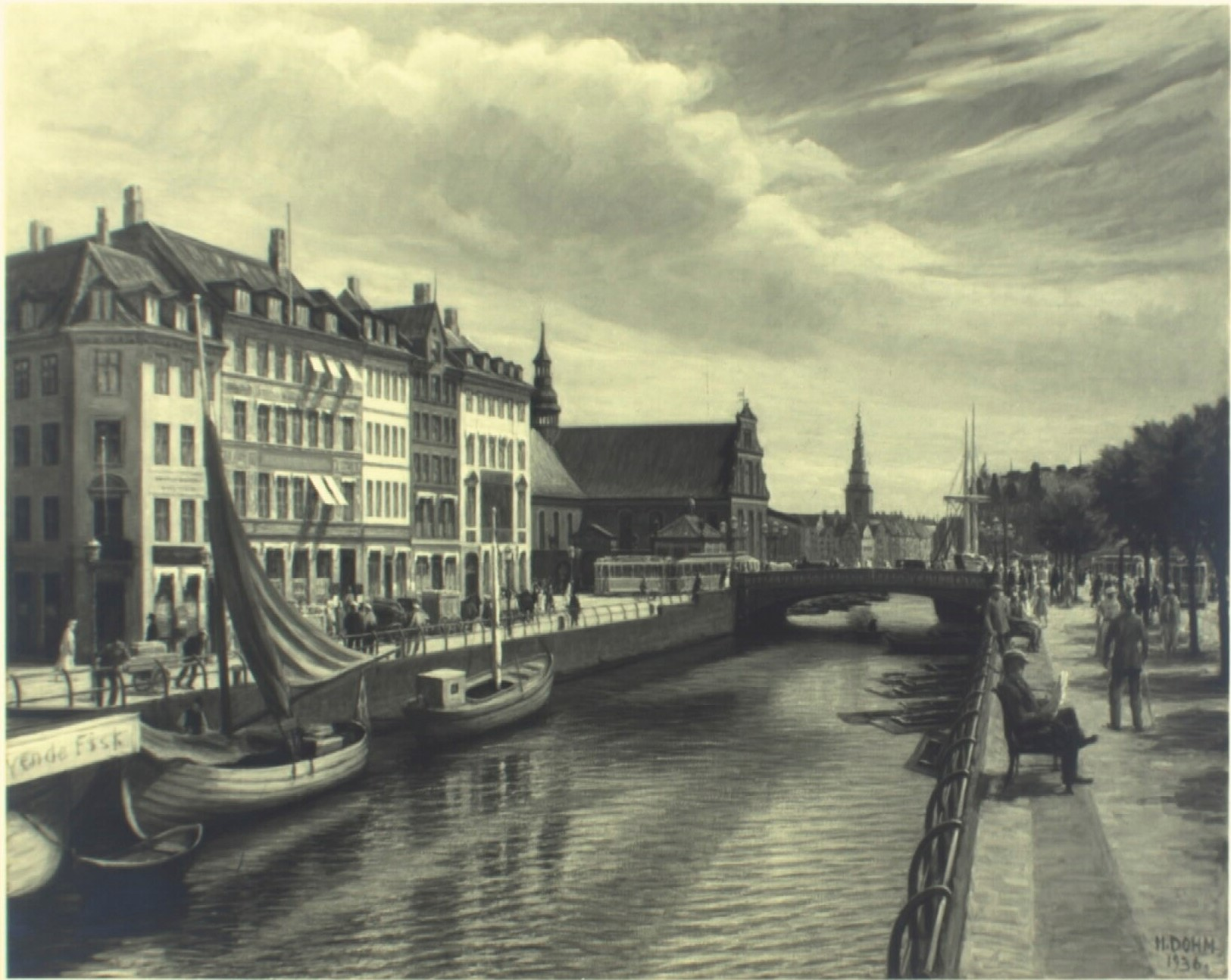
No. 9 seen furthest to the left on drawing by Heinrich Dohm, 1868

The building was like most of the other buildings in the area destroyed in the Copenhagen Fire of 1795. The plot was subsequently acquired by goldsmith Christen Nielsen Lindbach (1738-1815). The current building at the site was constructed for him by the master builder Philip Lange in 1796-1797.

The historian statistician Frederik Thaarup (1766-1845) lived in the building in 1821. The architect Gustav Friedrich Hetsch was among the residents from 1823. The violinist and composer Holger Simon Paulli lived in the building in 1836–1837.

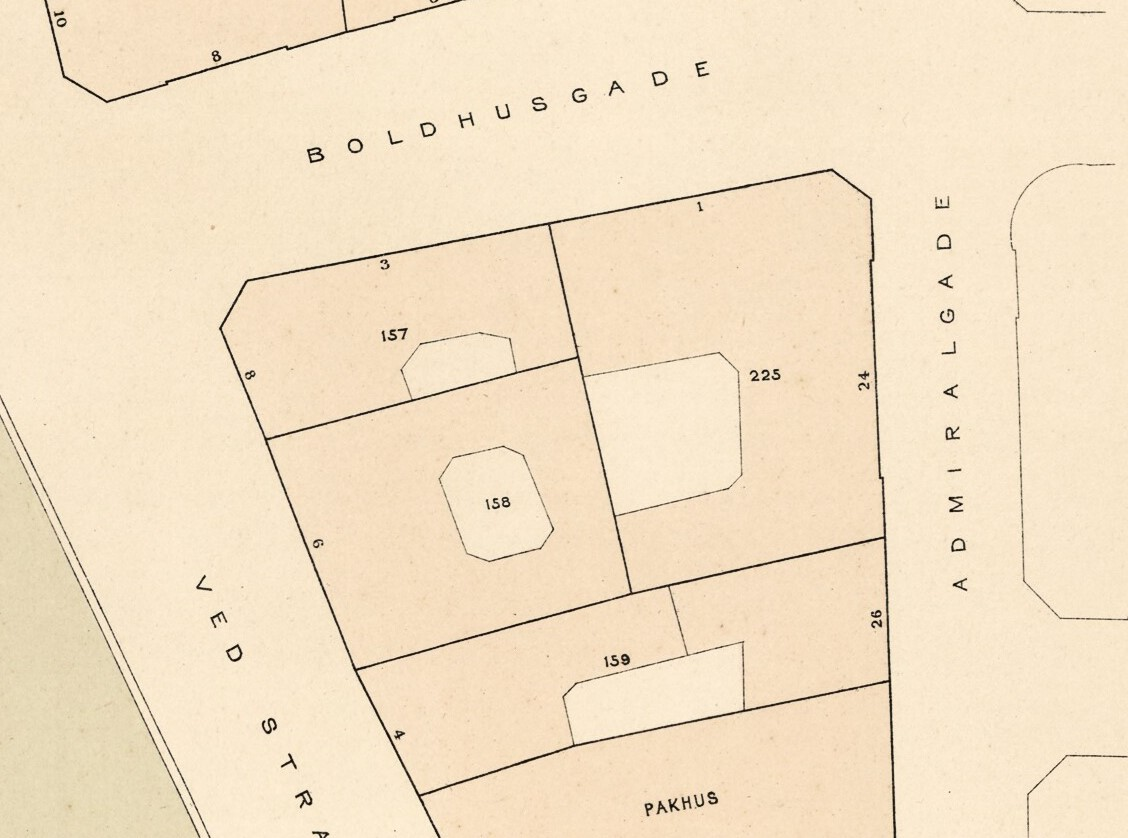
The layout of the property (upper left corner) seen in a detail from one of Berggreen's block plans of East Quarter, 1886-88

Aug. Strøh's Vinhandel, a wine company, has also been based in the building. The company was founded on 1 October 1894 by Aug. Strøh (died 1912) and was from 1924 owned by Knud Jørgensen (1879-1939). His sons, Asger Jørgensen born. 1907) and Robert Jørgensen (born 1910), owned the company from 1939.

The adjacent buildings in Ved Stranden were in the 1930s acquired by the Nordisk Genforsikring. They were in 1936-39 replaced with a new head office for the insurance company designed by the architect N. P. P. Gundstrup (1877-1949). Ved Stranden 8 was also acquired by the insurance company and integrated in their new head office. The entire complex was later taken over by the Ministry of Defence.

== Architecture ==
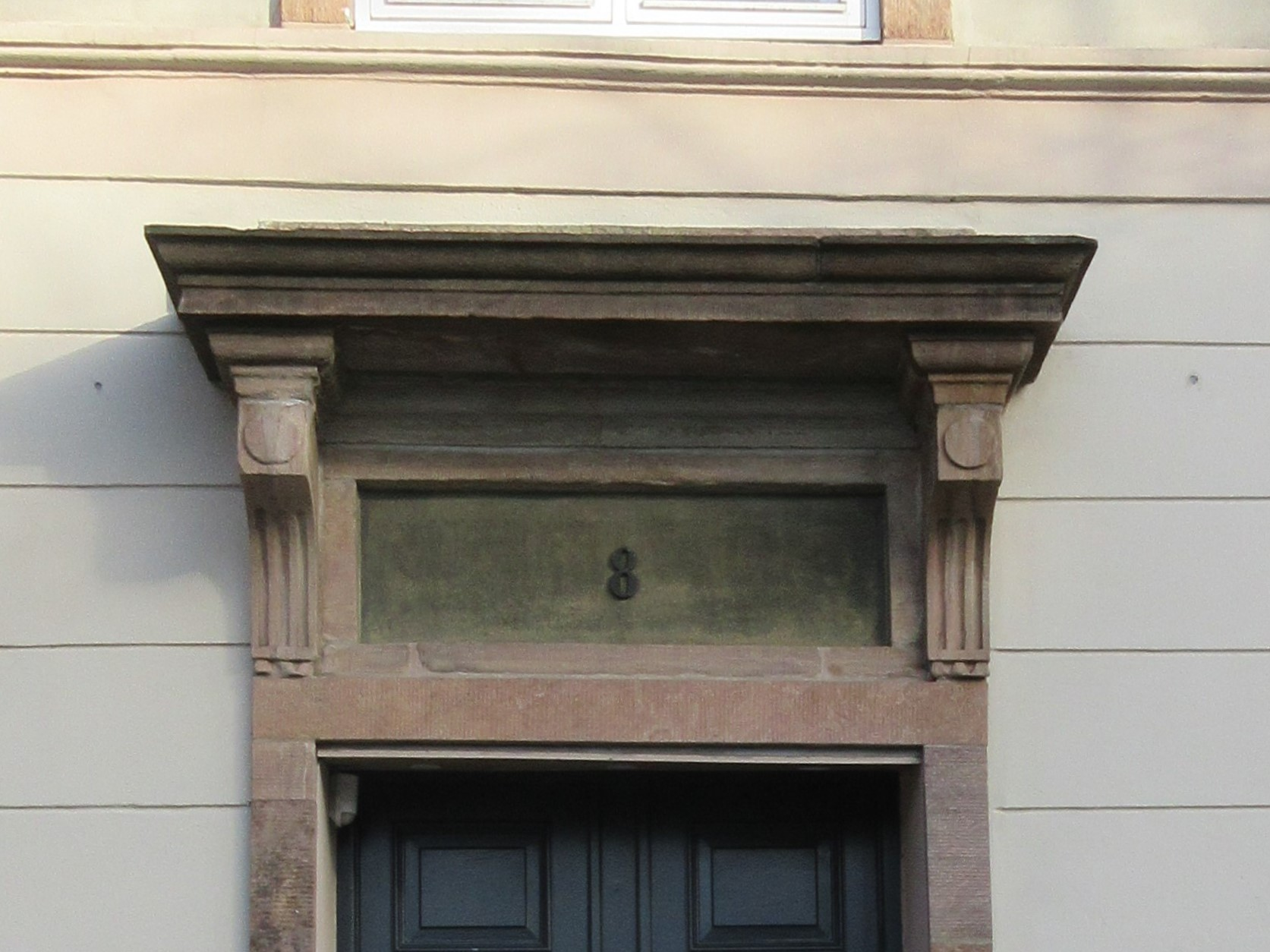
The hood mould over the corner entrance

The building consists of four floors over a high cellar. It has three bays towards Ved Stranden and nine bays towards Boldhusgade. The chamfered corner bay was a requirement under the new Copenhagen Building Act.

== Today ==
The Ministry of Defence is now based in the building.
