= Admiralgade =

Street in Copenhagen, Denmark

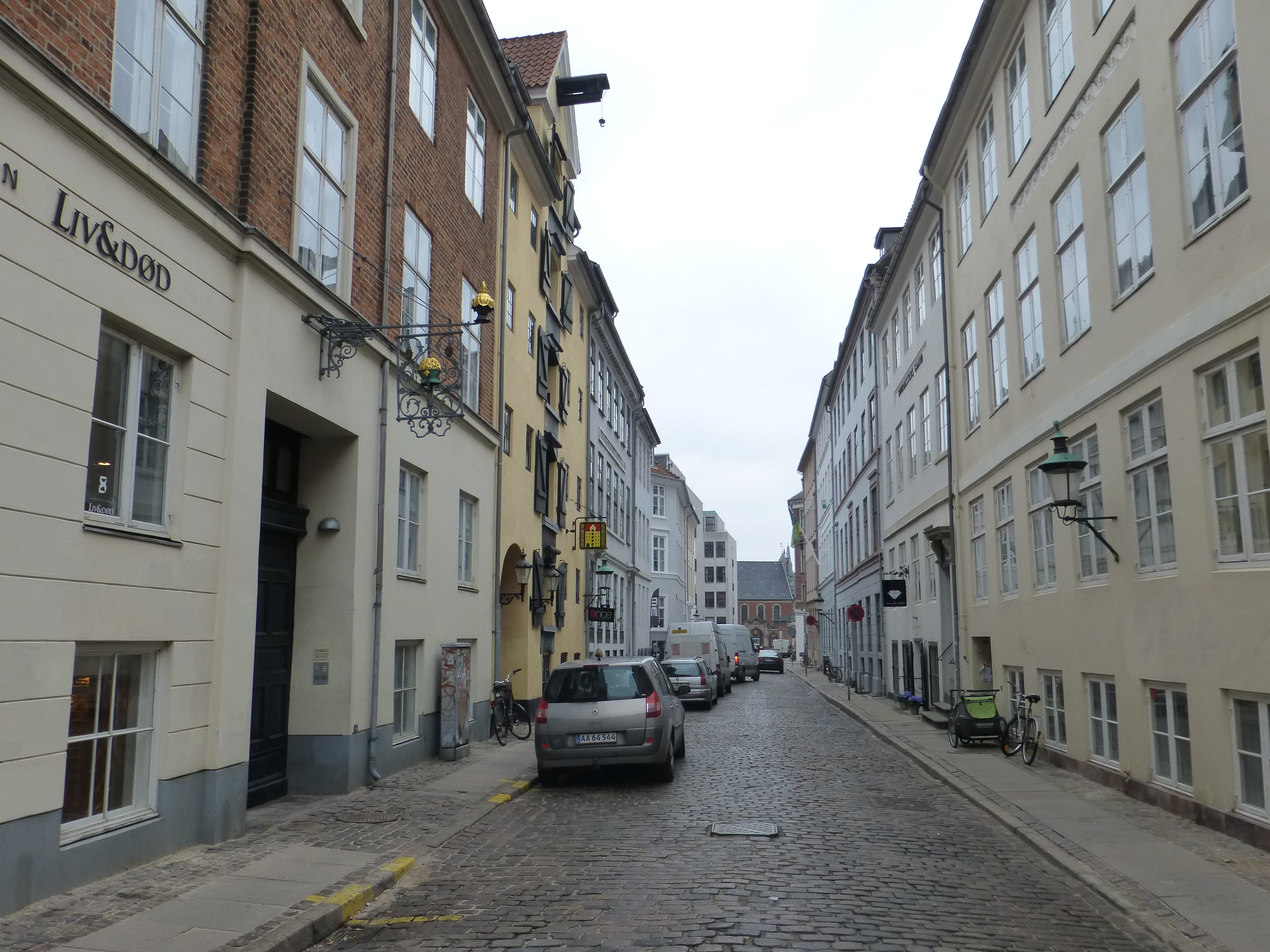
- Admiralgade
- Length: 170 m (560 ft)
- Location: Indre By, Copenhagen, Denmark
- Postal code: 1066
- Coordinates: 55°41′6″N 12°35′39″E

Admiralgade is a street in the Old Town of Copenhagen, Denmark. It runs from Nikolaj Plads in the north to Holmens Kanal in the south.

== History ==
Admiralgade was created in the middle of the 16th century and was home to several residences for naval officers. Admiralgården, the Admiral's official residence, was built at the southern corner of Admiralgade with Dybensgade in 1565. Peder Munk was the last admiral to reside in the building. From 1596, the building was used for the storage of body armors, but the name Admiralgade is seen in documents from 1653 and 1668.

Skipperboderne, a development of row houses for naval personnel, was built in the area between and Bremerholm between 1614 and 1622. Skipperhusene and the other buildings in the street were destroyed in the Copenhagen Fire of 1728 but when they were again destroyed by fire in the Fire of 1795 they were not rebuilt but replaced by taller buildings.

== Buildings and residents ==
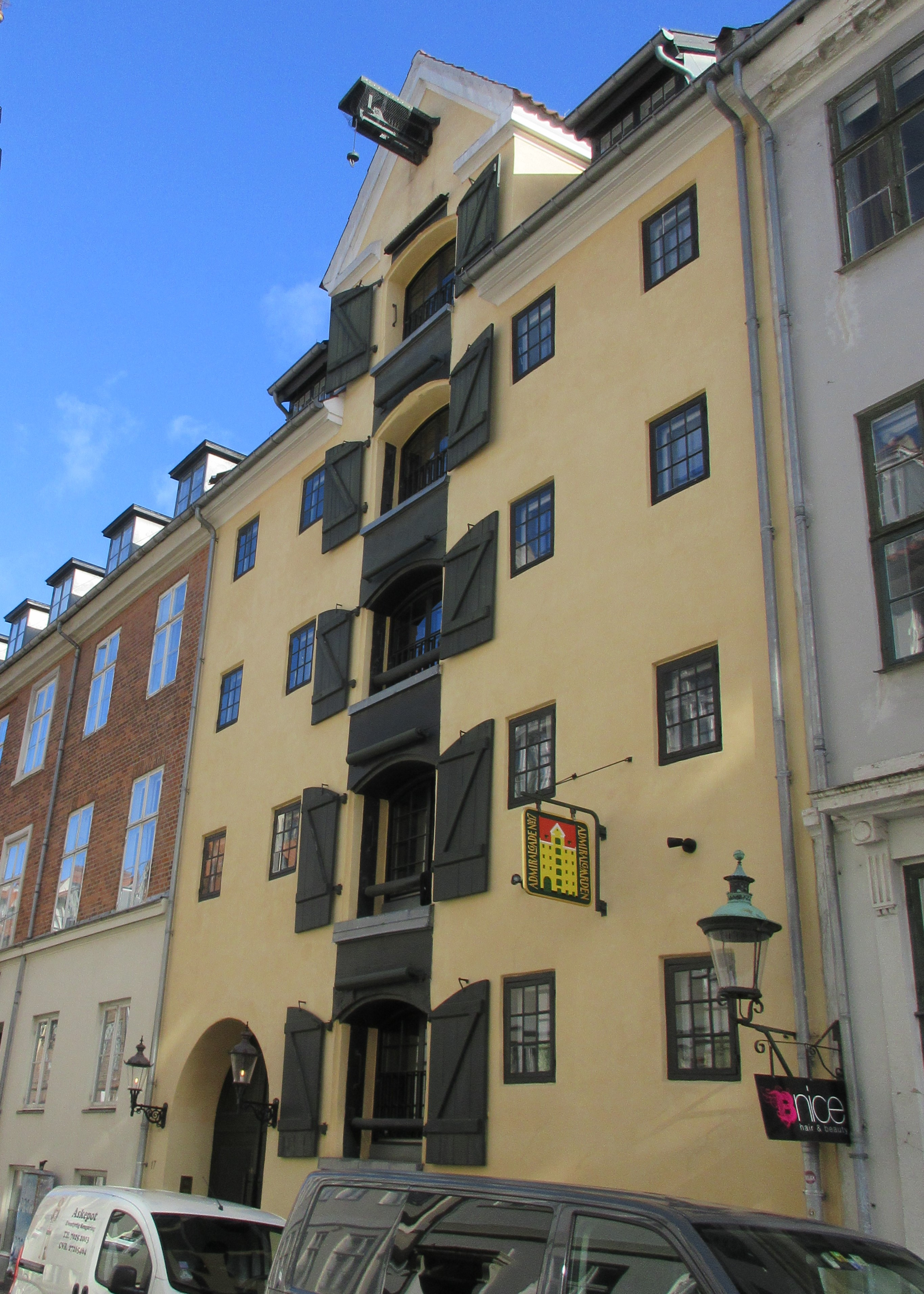
No. 17: Admiralgården

N. 17–25 and No. 20–24 all date from the late 1790s and are listed. The Bormeister House at No. 29 was built in 1797—98 for J. E. Burmeister. No. 17 is an old warehouse. The theatre Boldhus Teatret is based in No. 26. It opened in a former paper storage in 1965 and has an ambition to be "smallest, bravest and strangest".

The office building at No. 27–31 (Admiralgade 27-31 / Holmens Kanal 22 / Nikolajgade 26) is from 1960 and was built for the insurance company Forsikringsselskabet Haand i Haand (Hafnia).

== Cultural references ==
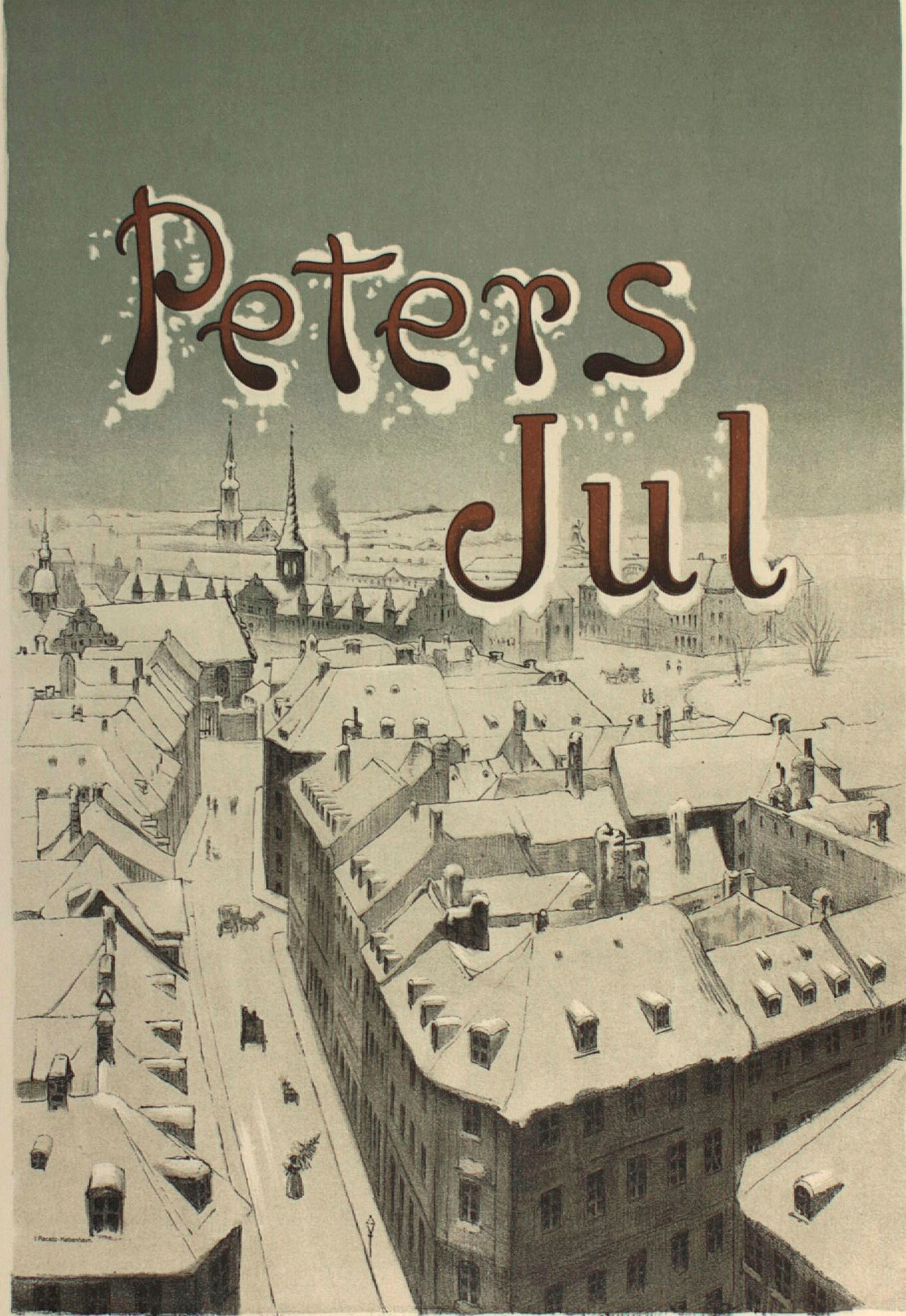
Admiralgade seen on the cover of Peters Jul

A bird's eye view drawing down Admiralgade is seen on the cover of the 1889 edition of Johan Krohn's classic Danish Christmas story Peters Jul, created by Frants Henningsen who also created the other illustrations for the book.

== Transport ==
Admiralgade is only open to one-way traffic in the direction from Nikolaj Plads to Holmens Kanal. The nearest metro stations are Gammel Strand (140 m) and Kongens Nytorv (320 m).
