= Knabrostræde 21 =

Building in Copenhagen

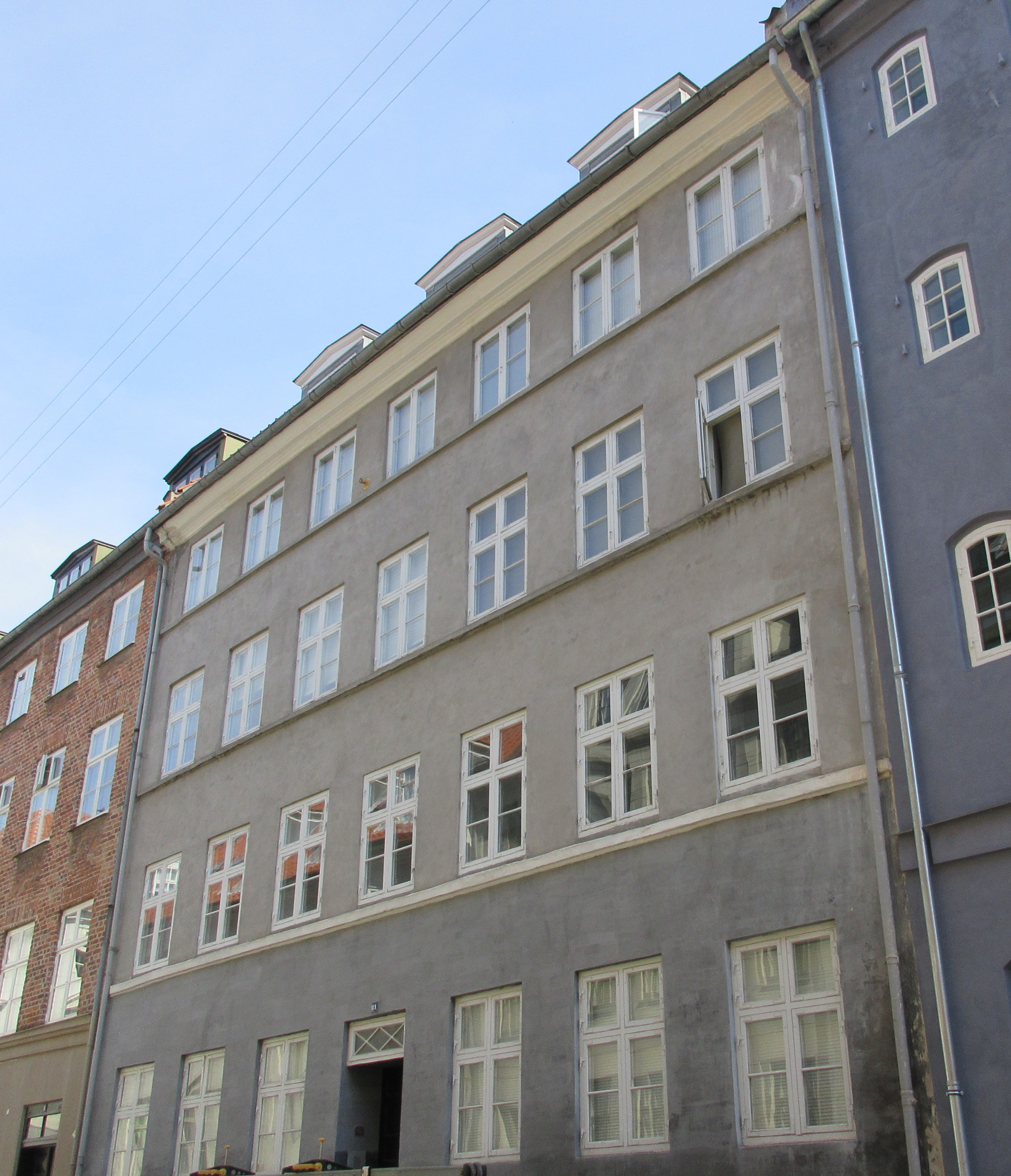
- Interactive map of the Knabrostræde 21 area

General information
- Location: Copenhagen, Denmark
- Coordinates: 55°40′37.06″N 12°34′33.02″E
- Completed: 1798

Design and construction
- Architect: Johan Martin Quist

Knabrostræde 21 is a Neoclassical property in the Old Town of Copenhagen, Denmark. It is one of the many residential buildings constructed by the industrious master builder Johan Martin Quist in the years after the Copenhagen Fire of 1795. It was listed on the Danish registry of protected buildings and places in 1945, and unlisted in 2019.

== History ==
=== 18th century ===
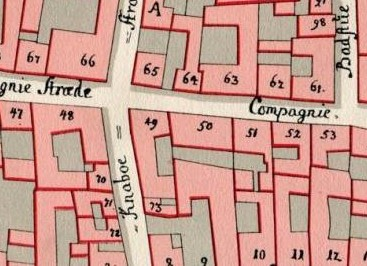
No. 73 and 49 seen in a detail from Christian Gedde's map of Snaren's Quarter, 1757

The property was in Copenhagen's first cadastre of 1689 listed as No. 79. It was at that time owned by tailor Lars Eriksen. It was listed as No. 73 and was then owned by the widow of Arent Johansen Krej.

The property was destroyed in the Copenhagen Fire of 1795, together with most of the other buildings in the area. The fire sites No. 73 and the adjacent corner property at No. 49 (now Knabrostræde 19) were after the fire acquired by the master builder Johan Martin Quist (1755–1818). A small section of No. 40 was in this connection transferred to the old No. 73. The current building on the site was constructed by Quist in 1797–98.

=== 19th century ===
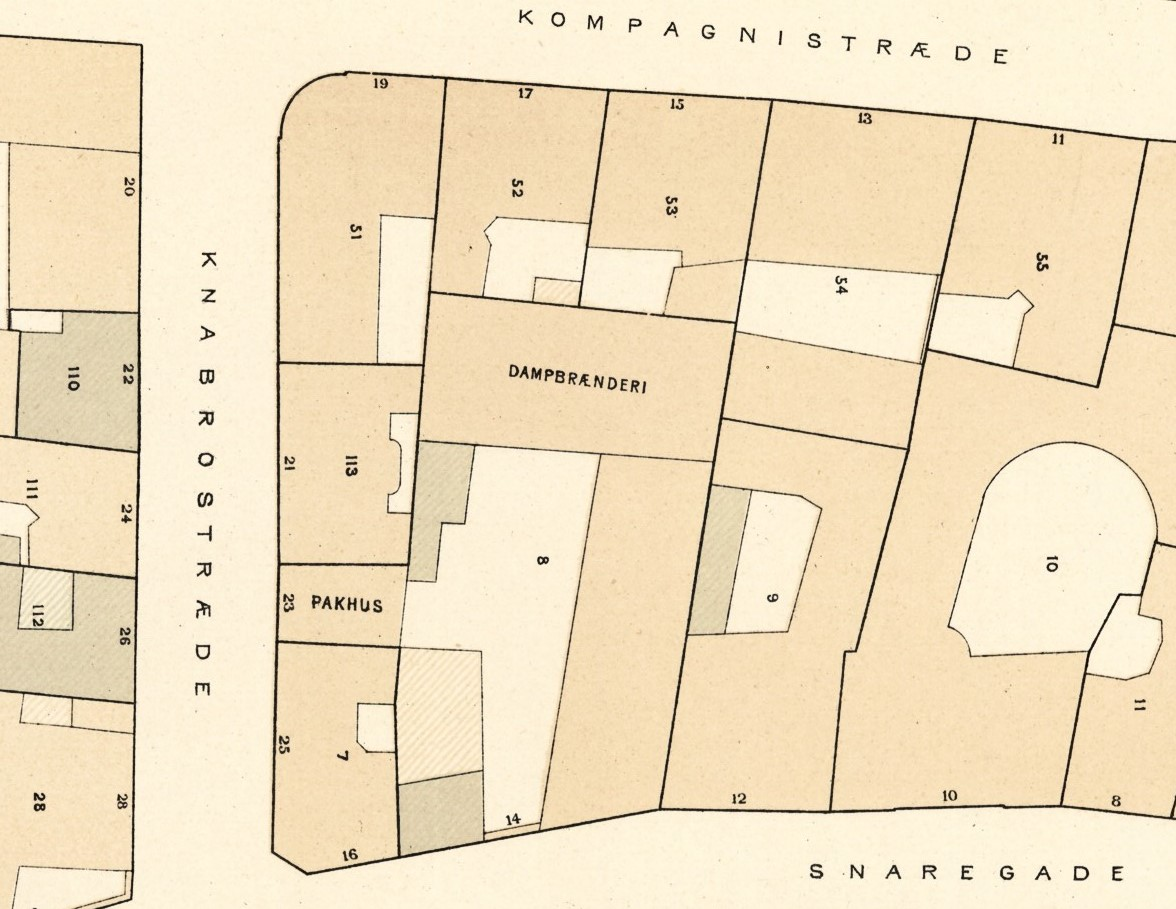
Knabrostræde 32 seen in a detail from Berggreen's cadastral map of Snaren's Quarter, 1884

No. 49B is for some reason missing in the census records from 1801. The property was listed as No. 113 in the new cadastre of 1806. It was at that time owned by a regiment quarter master named Møller.

At the time of the 1840 census, No. 113 was home to a total of 31 people. They included royal customs officer Jacob Lorentz Prom (born 1780), master shoemaker Ludvig Christian Prom (born 1814), book printer Marie Irgens (born 1769), coachman (kgl. kavalerkysk) Niels Christian Grækersen (born 1800) and worker Peter Jensen Osberg (born 1794) with their respective households. With the introduction of house numbering in Copenhagen, in 1859, Snaren's Quarter No. 113 became Knabrostræde 21.

== Architecture ==
The building consists of four storeys over a raised cellar and is seven bays wide. The centrally placed main entrance is topped by a transom window. The roof features five dormer windows towards the street. Two perpendicular side wings extend from the rear side of the building.

== Today ==
The building has been divided into condominiums.
