= Amaliegade 43 =

Building in Copenhagen, Denmark

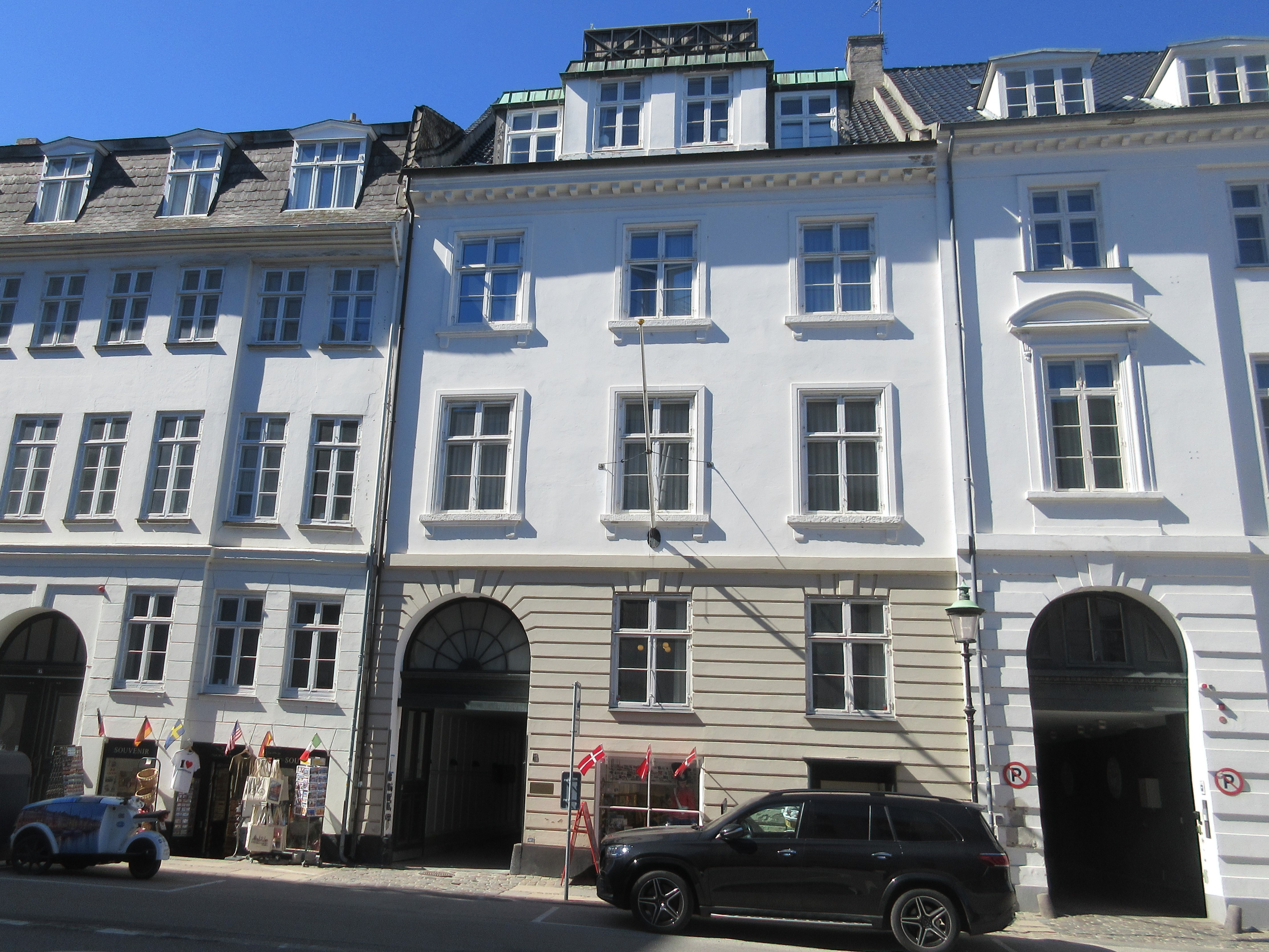
- Amaliegade 43 in April 2026.

General information
- Location: Copenhagen, Denmark
- Coordinates: 55°41′14.74″N 12°35′44.9″E
- Construction started: 1790
- Completed: 1793

Design and construction
- Architect: Johan Martin Quist/Andreas Hallander

Amaliegade 43 is a Neoclassical property in the Frederiksstaden district of central Copenhagen, Denmark.

== History ==
=== 18th century ===
The site was one of several lots at the northern end of Amaliegade that were acquired by royal building inspector Caspar Frederik Harsdorff. His project for the area was rejected and he was at the same time faced with severe economic difficulties. Andreas Hallander and Johan Martin Quist, two of his former students, saved him from bankruptcy by acquiring the Amaliegade lots. Quist, who had acquired the one furthest to the south, began the construction of Amaliegade 43 in about 1790. The building was later completed by Hallander in 1792–1793. It was built for admiral Jørgen Balthazar Winterfeldt.

=== 19th century ===
In the new cadastre of 1806, the property was listed as No. 137. It was by then still owned by Wintherfeldt.

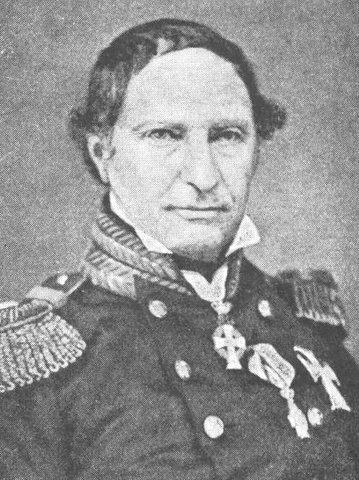
Jens Seidelin

At the time of the 1834 census, No. 137 was home to four households. Jens Seidelin (1790–1863), a captain in the Royal Danish Navy, then away with a merchant ship, resided on the ground floor with his wife Anna Elisabeth Seidelin, their five children (aged one to 18) and two maids. Peter August Habse, a ship broker, resided on the first floor with his wife Anna Bech, their three children (aged 10 to 17), the wife's sister Catarine Bech and two maids. Henrik Jørgen Hansen, a first lieutenant in Sjællandske Jægerkorps, resided on the second floor with his wife Marie Christiane Lund, their four-year-old daughter and two maids. Anders Nielsen Smidstrup, a grocer (høker) resided in the basement with his wife Bernadine Dorte, their seven children (aged one to 12) and one maid.

At the time of the 1945 census, No. 137 was home to three households. Peter de Nully Brown (1799–1971), a merchant, resided in the building with his wife Karen ("Caroline") Braadan, their five children (aged nine to 18) and one maid. Johannes Nicolaj Amnitsbøll, a wine merchant, resided in the building with his wife Johanne Henriette Kolnem, his foster mother Johanne Sørensen /née Ebbesen), his foster sister Ane Sophie Sørensen, two employees in his wine business (one of them an apprentice), a male servant and a maid. Rasmus Samuel That, a physician and member of Sundhedskollegiet, resided in the building with his mother Christine That née Wollerup, a female cook and a maid.

=== 20th century ===
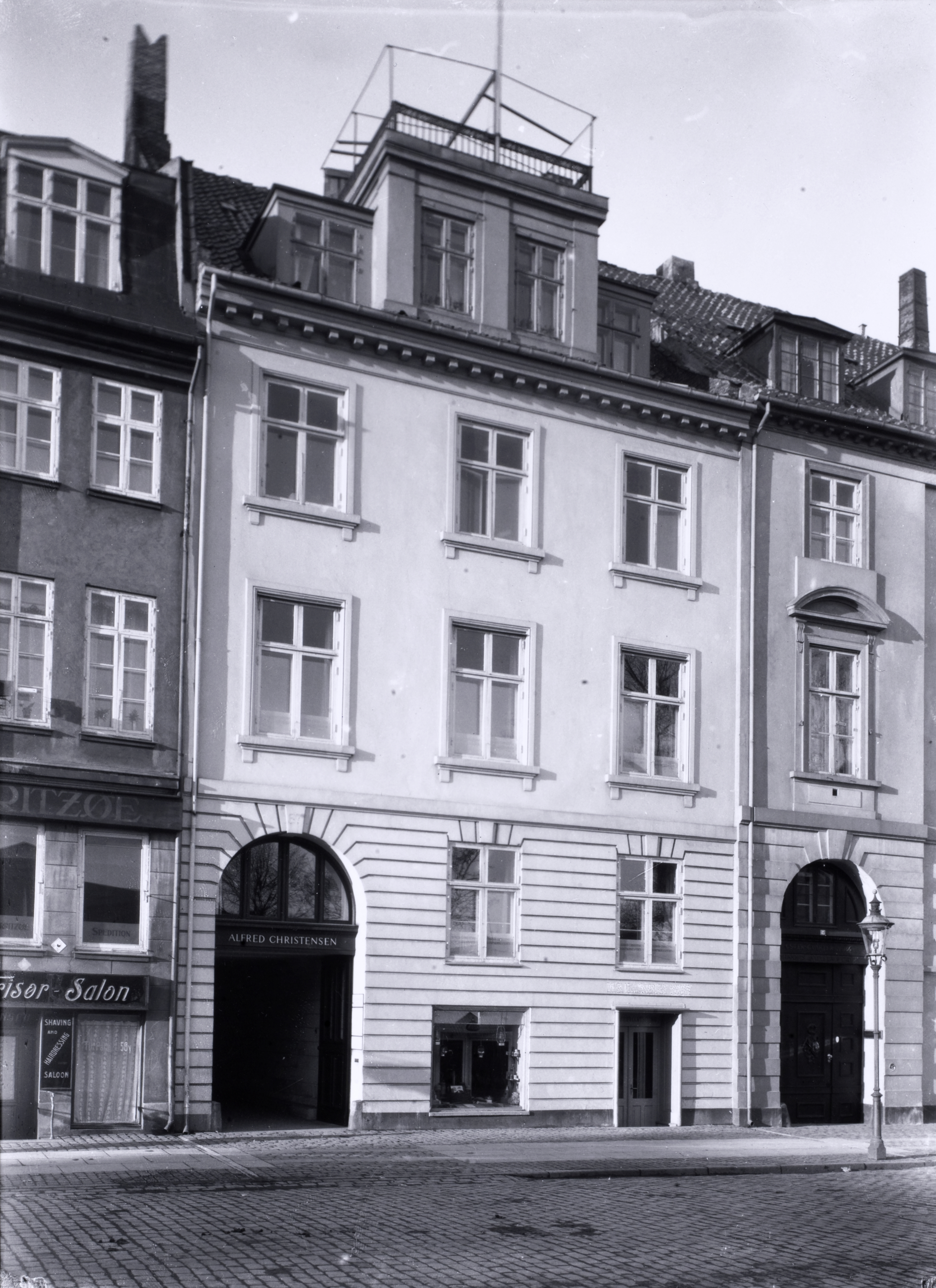
Amaliegade 43 with Alfred Christensen's name on the gate photographed by Peter Elfelt in 1926

In 1919, Peter de Nully Brown was still among the residents. Count Cai Friedrich Reventlow (1753–1834) lived in the building in 1802–03. Professor of history at the University of Copenhagen Frederik Schiern (1816–1882) was a resident in the building from 1853 to 1859. C. F. W. Rosenberg (1829–1885), a literary historian, was also a resident in 1857. The building was before 2008 acquired by Jeudan.

Alfred Christensen's shipping company was also based in the building.

== Architecture ==
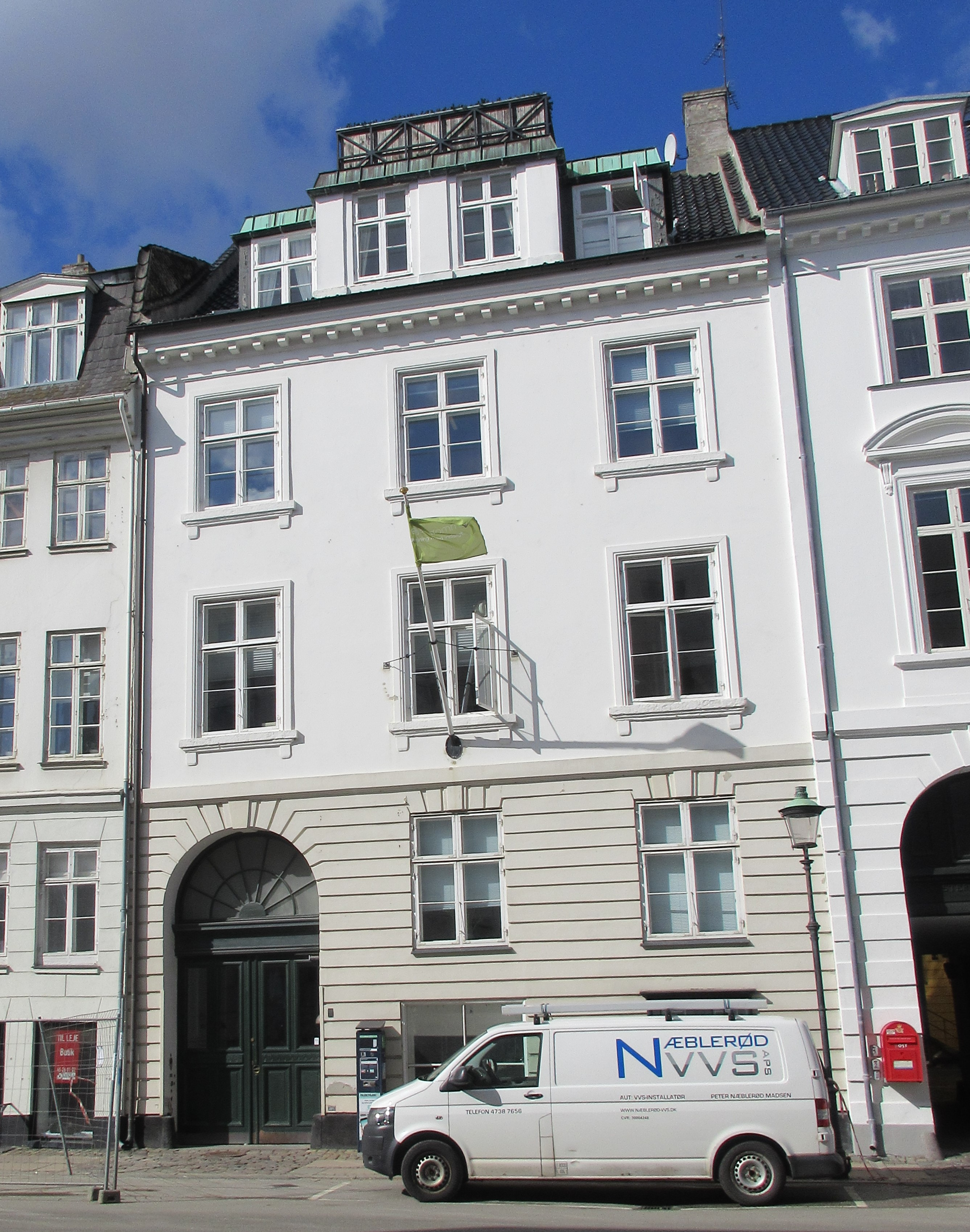
Amaliegade 43.

The building consists of three storeys over a high cellar and is just three bays wide. The roof, with its three dormers of which the central one is a two-bay wall dormer, dates from 1871. A three-storey, six bay side wing extends from the rear side of the building.

== Today ==
The building has been converted into office space. Current tenants include P&i Services Denmark, a service provider for the global P&I Club industry, and the Rasmus Nissen law firm.
