= Kronprinsessegade 16 =

Building in Copenhagen, Denmark

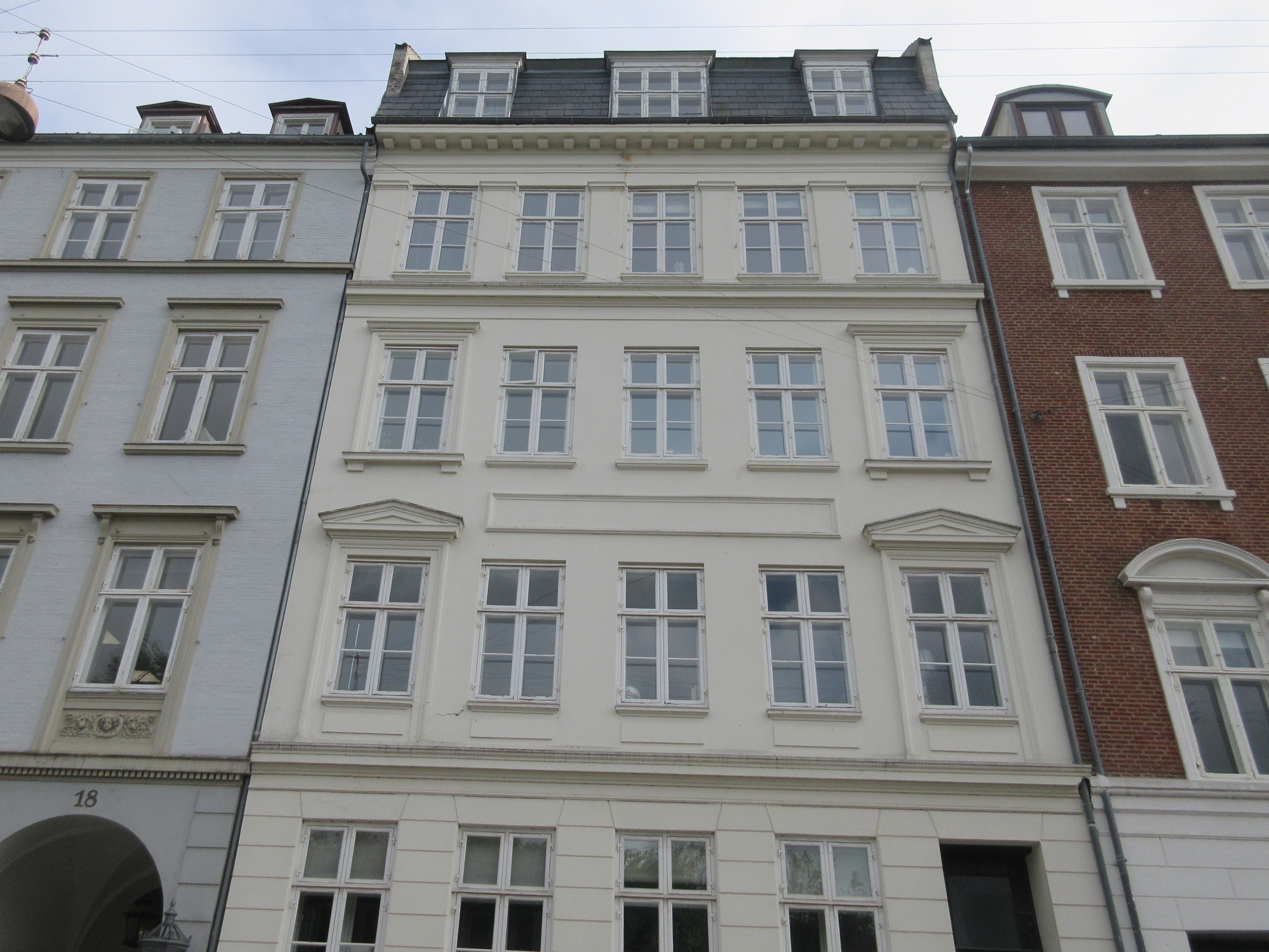
- Interactive map of the Kronprinsessegade 16 area

General information
- Location: Copenhagen, Denmark
- Coordinates: 55°41′0.65″N 12°34′53.9″E
- Completed: 1807

Design and construction
- Architect: Johan Martin Quist

Kronprinsessegade 16 is a Neoclassical property overlooking Rosenborg Castle Garden in central Copenhagen, Denmark.

== History ==
=== Construction ===
Kronprinsessegade 16 was built in 1807 as one of five properties at Kronprinsessegade No. 10-18 that were built by master builder Johan Martin Quist. The property was listed in the new cadastre of 1806 as No. 390 in St. Ann's West Quarter.

The poet Jens Baggesen was a resident in the building in the mid-1810s.

=== Hedvig Erichsen ===
Hedevig Eriksen, widow of Mogens Erichsen on Saint Croix, resided on the ground floor at the 1834 census. She lived there with her five children (aged three to 15) and one maid.

Hedevig Erichsen still resided on the ground floor at the 1840 census. She lived there with her six children (aged 10 to 20) and one maid. Elisabeth Elokin, Secilie Elokin and Ane Elokin—three unmarried sisters (aged 79 to 8t)—resided on the first floor with two maids. Emanuel Blom, a commander captain in the Royal Danish Navy, resided on the third floor with his wife Christophine Joachime Blom (née Grüsier), their six children (aged two to 19) and one maid. Sophie Christine Simonsen (née Hansen), a widow barkeeper, resided in the basement with her four children (aged six to 12), one male servant and five lodgers.

=== 1845 census ===
The property was home to five households at the 1845 census. Marie Christine Kromdyer, a widow, resided on the ground floor with her 18-year-old son Georg Lauritz Kromdyer, her brother Lauritz Andreas Hansen and one maid. Peter Christian Küker, an infantry ciolonel, resided on the first floor with his wife Wilhelmine Dorethea Christiane (née Maule) and one maid. Niels Christian Mühlensteth, an executive secretary in Bureauet for Armeens Commandosager, resided on the second floor with his wife Emma Eulalia (née Rørbye, sister of Martinus Rørbye, their two children (aged one and three) and one maid. Niels Christian Bjerring, a language teacher, resided on the third floor with his wife Marie Clemece Elisa Livio, their one-year-old daughter and two maids. Johannes Rudolph Nicolaus Schwenn, a cigar manufacturer, resided in the basement with his wife Anne Marie Lund, their two children (aged one and four) and one maid.

=== Later history ===
The writer and educator Athalia Schwartz (1821–1871) lived in the building from 1851 to 1853.

== Architecture ==
The building consists of four storeys over a high cellar and is five bays wide. Two triangular pediments are located over the outer windows on the second floor. The Mansard roof with three dormers dates from 1902 to 1908. A five-storey side wing projects from the rear side of the building. The complex was listed on the Danish registry of protected buildings and places on 14 April 1945.

== Gallery ==
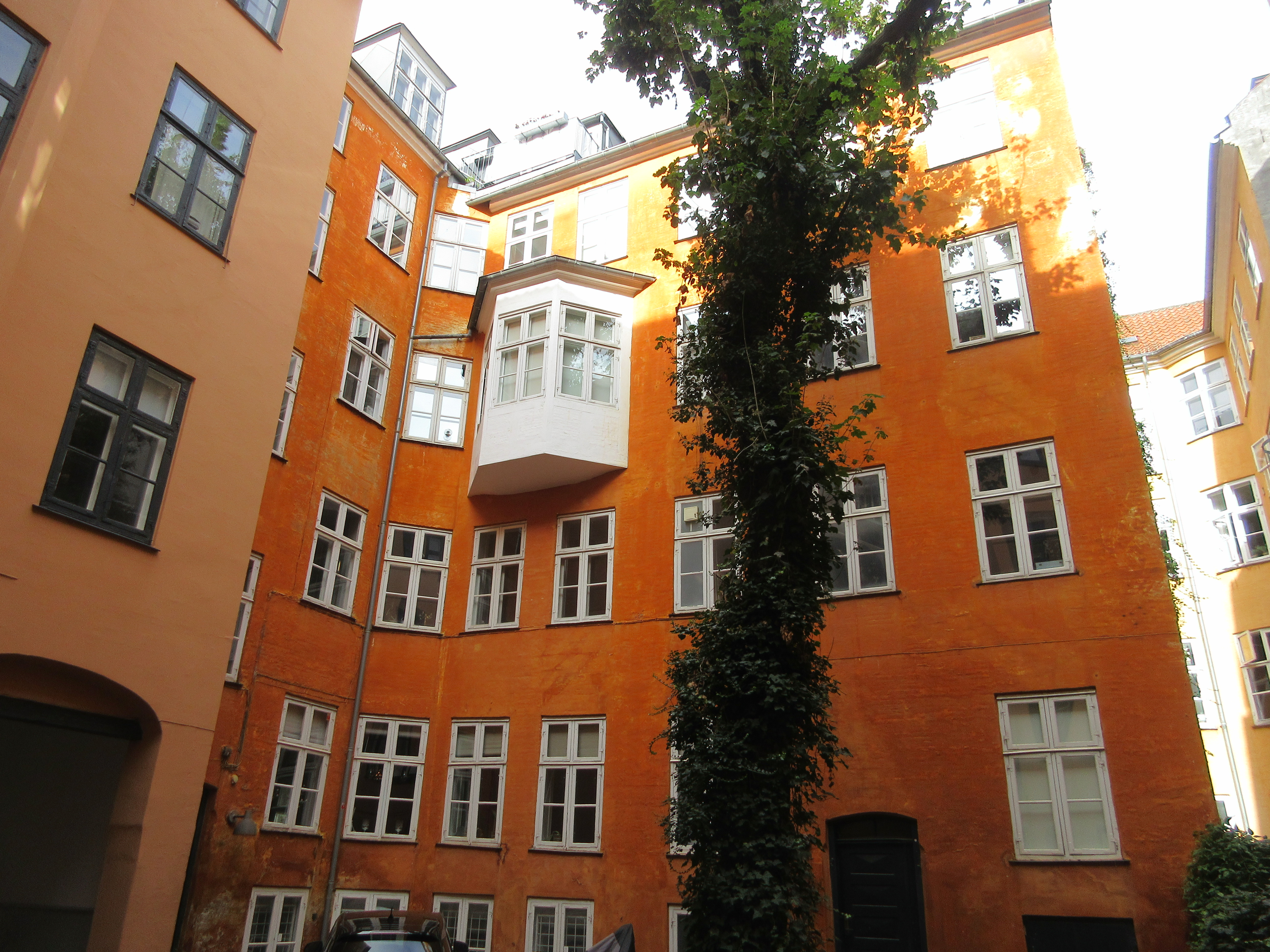
The building seen from the courtyard.
