= Gustmeyer House =

Building in Copenhagen

Coordinates: 55.6775°N 12.5814°E

- Gustmeyers Gård
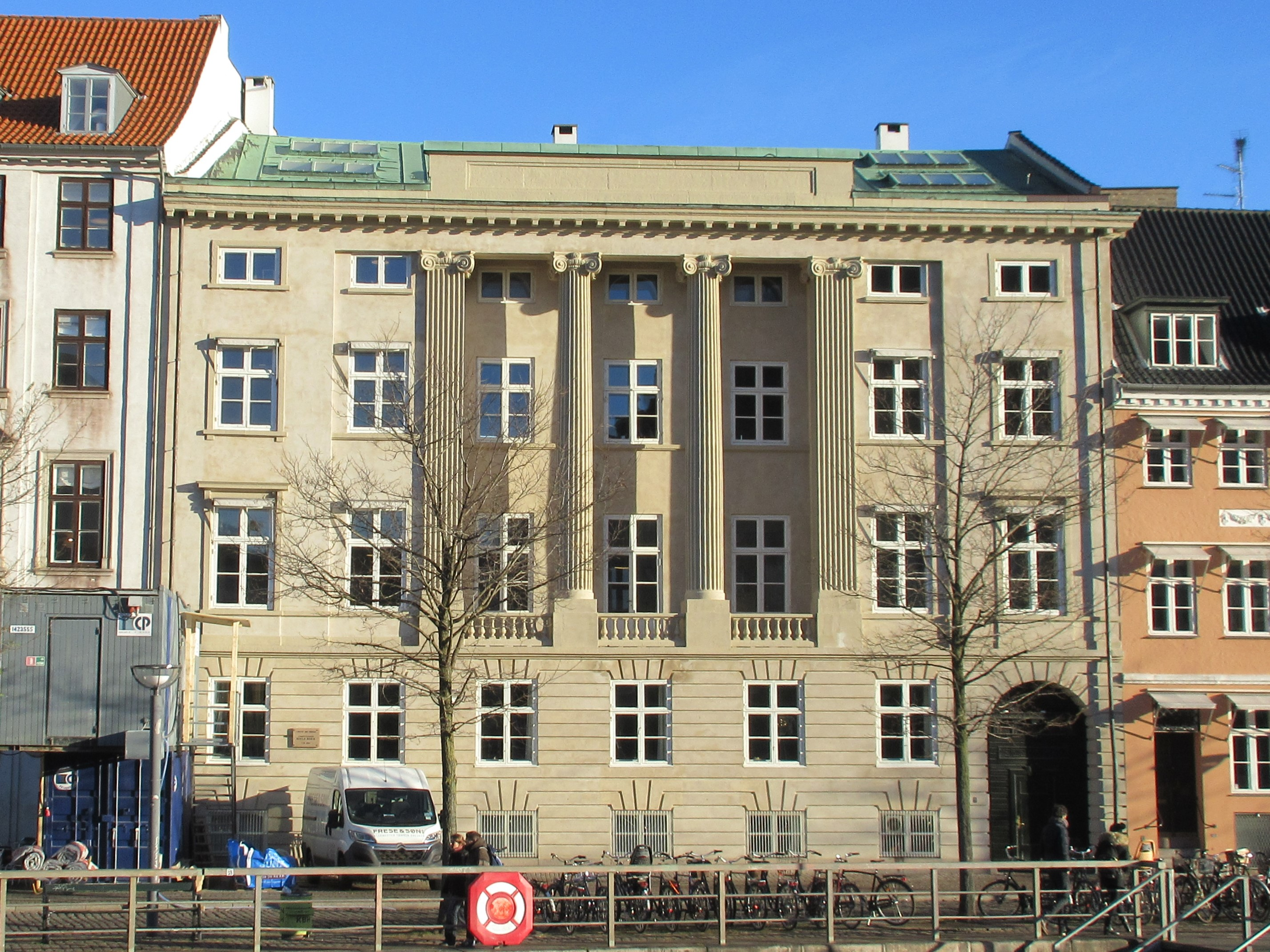
- The principal facade facing Ved Stranden
- Interactive map of the Gustmeyer House area

General information
- Architectural style: Neoclassical
- Location: Copenhagen, Denmark, Denmark
- Current tenants: McKinsey & Company
- Construction started: 1796
- Completed: 1797
- Client: Frederik Ludolf Gustmeyer
- Owner: ATP Ejendomme

Design and construction
- Architect: Johan Martin Quist

The Gustmeyer House (Danish: Gustmeyers Gård) is a historic property on Ved Stranden, opposite Christiansborg Palace on Slotsholmen, in central Copenhagen, Denmark. It was built in 1797 to a Neoclassical design by Johan Martin Quist. The Nobel Prize-winning physicist Niels Bohr was born in the building. McKinsey & Company is now based in the building.

== History ==
=== 18th century ===
The site was formerly made up of two separate properties, one facing the canal and one facing Admiralgade on the other side of the block. The larger property towards the canal was listed in Copenhagen's first cadastre of 1689 as No. 212 and belonged to judge and mayor Christen Andersen at that time. The smaller property in Admiralgade was listed as No. 207 and belonged to Henrik Lydersen.

=== Gustmeyer and the new building ===
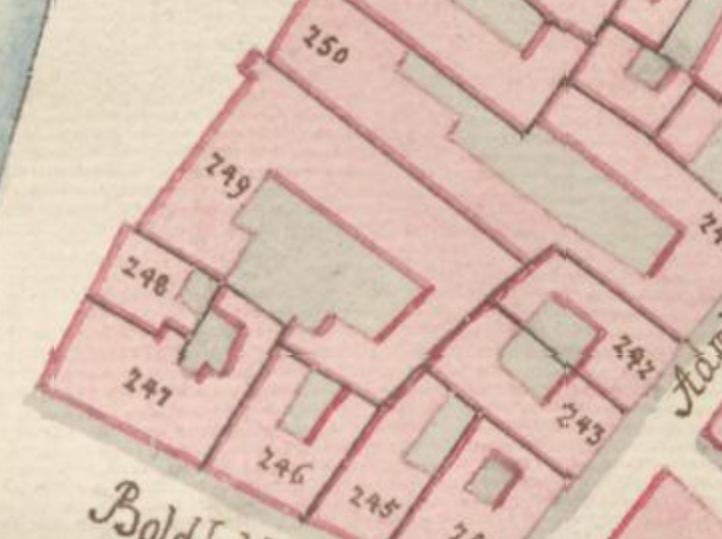
No. 249 and No. 243 seen in a detail from Christian Gedde's map of the East Quarter, 1757

The larger property towards the canal was at some point acquired by the general trader Carl Hieronimus Gustmeyer, His property was listed in the new cadastre of 1756 as No. 249 in the East Quarter. The smaller property in Admiralgade was listed as No. 243 and belonged to cooper Christen Larsen but was later also acquired by Gustmeyer.

The property was after Carl Hieronimus Gustmeyer's death in 1756 passed down to his son Friedrich.

Frid.Ludolp Goubmeyer's property No. 249 was home to 21 residents in three households at the time of the 1787 census. Hustmeyer resided in the building with his wife Ane Dorethea Goubmeyer, their two children (aged five and seven), a bookkeeper, a clerk, an apprentice, two maids, a caretaker, a lodger and a coachman. Ch.Haraldsen, a tea merchant, resided in the basement with his wife Cath Olsen Walloe, their four children (aged one to six) and one maid. Jacob Detour, a potseller, resided in the basement with his wife Inger Niels Datter. No. 243 was home to 16 residents in three households. Christen Thaarup, who served as treasurer at the Harbour Commission, resided in the building with his wife Karen Grivel, their 11-year-old daughter Abelone Catrine Thaarup, the sons Friderich and Nicolaj Thaarup from his first marriage (aged 19 and 19), one maid and two lodgers. Ottilia Leutzau, widow of justitsraad Leutzau, resided in the building with one maid. Niels Thygesen, a mate (styrmand), resided in the building with his wife Nille Marie Niels Datter, their two children (aged two and four), one maid and one lodger.

The building was destroyed in the Copenhagen Fire of 1795. The present building on the site was completed in 1796 to designs by Johan Martin Quist. Quist was one of a handful of master builders who obtained a near monopoly on the rebuilding of the city after the fire.

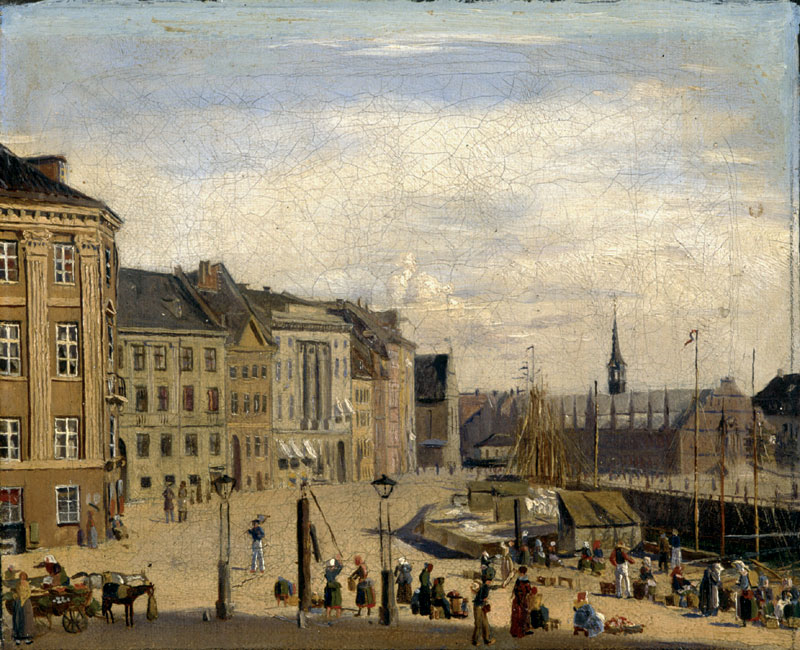
The house, painted by Sally Henriques

Friderich Ludwig Gustmeyer's building complex was home to three households at the 1801 census. Gustmeyer and his wife resided in the building with their two children (aged 19 and 20), and the senior clerk Bengt Julius Lingblom. Carl Wigandt Falbe, a judge in Hof- og Stadsretten, resided in the building with his wifem a servant. Mosses Wessely Junior, a grocer (urtekræmmer), a Jewish merchant, resided in the building with his wife Sikke Wallick and their five children. The remaining residents were either employees in Gustmeyer's trading firm or servants.

The property was listed in the new cadastre of 1806 as No. 154 in the East Quarter. Gustmeyer lost the family fortune during the economic crisis that resulted from Denmark's involvement in the Napoleonic Wars.

=== Nicolai Abraham Holten ===
A later owner of the property was Nicolai Abraham Holten. He sold it when he was appointed as director of Øresund Custom House in Helsingør in 1839.

=== Anders Ancher ===
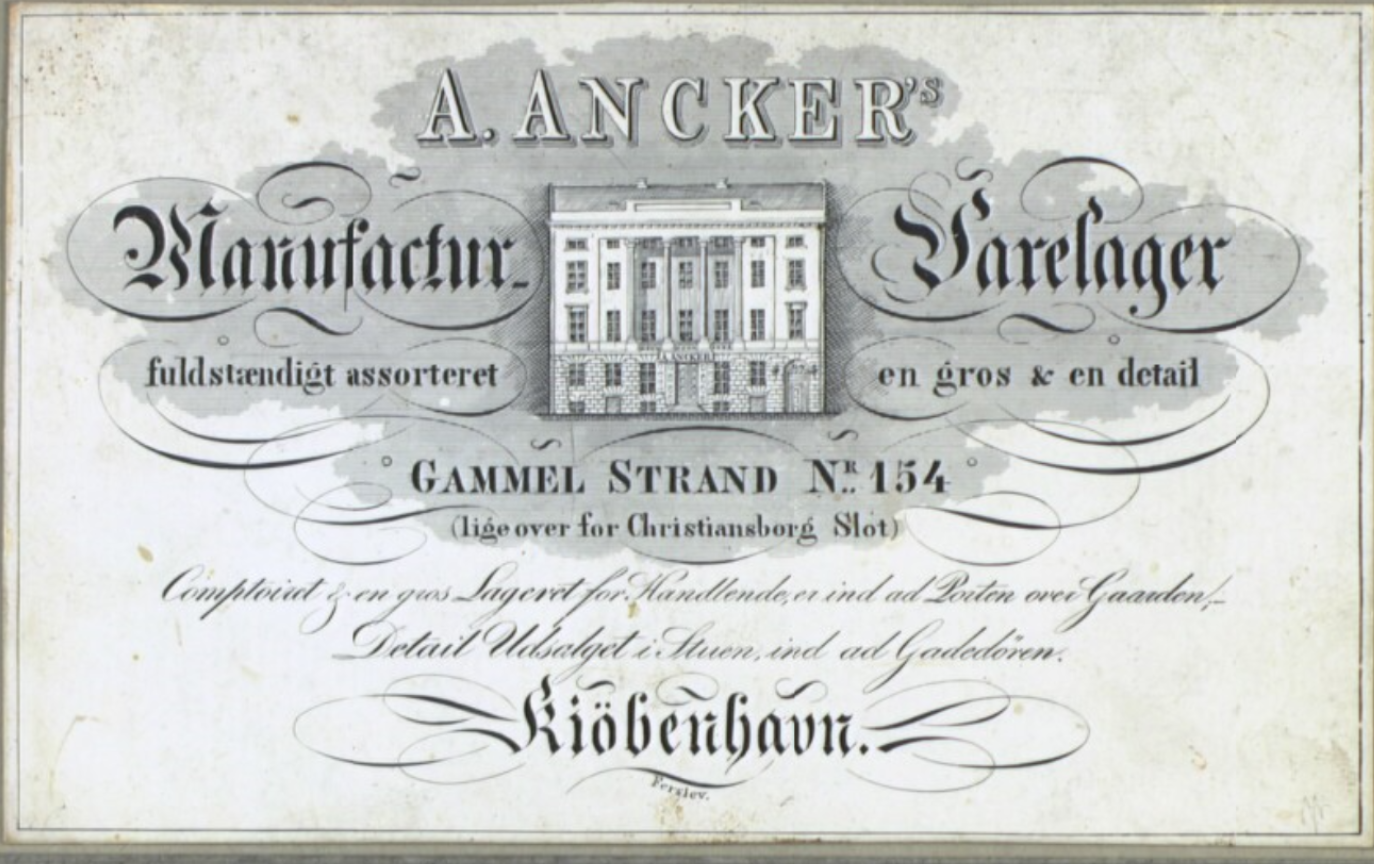
Advertisement for A. Anckers Manufactur Varelager

The property was later acquired by the textile merchant Anders Ancher who ran his textile business from the premises under the name A. Anckers Manufactur Varelager. At the time of the 1845 census, the property was home to a total of 12 people. Anders Ancker, a textile wholesale merchant, resided with his son, three employees, three apprentices and three servants on the ground floor. Ane Sophie Brown (1768–1855), widow of vice admiral Peter Caspar Wessel Brown (1755–1840), was residing with Eleonora Christine Harboe and two maids on the first floor. Frederik Augs. Clementzen was also living there with them. Balthasar Münter (1797–1867), provost of Holmens Church, resided on the second floor with his wife, two daughters and three maids. Ole Christian Borgen, a merchant, resided with his wife, their five children, his mother-in-law, an employee and two maids on the third floor.

Anders Ancher was, at the time of the 1850 census, residing on the ground floor. Anne Sophie Wessel-Brown and Eleonora Christine Harboe had been joined by Harboe's sister Elisabeth Charlotte Harboe. Anna Margrethe Lange, daughter of the owner of Rødkilde Manor on Funen, was also residing there with them. Jens Frederik August Clementsen, personal secretary for prince Frederik Ferdinand, was also a resident on the first floor. The second floor was still occupied by Balthazer Münter and his family.

=== Scheele and Friedlænger ===
Former foreign minister Ludvig Nicolaus von Scheele resided in the building from 1868 until 1873. Sally Friedlænders Papirhandel og Kortforlag, a stationery business and publisher of art prints and postcards, was also based in the building from circa 1870. The firm had been taken over in 1860 by Ditmer Firmaet in partnership with the namesake founder's son Vilhelm Friedlænder. It was based at the site until 1903.

=== Adler family ===
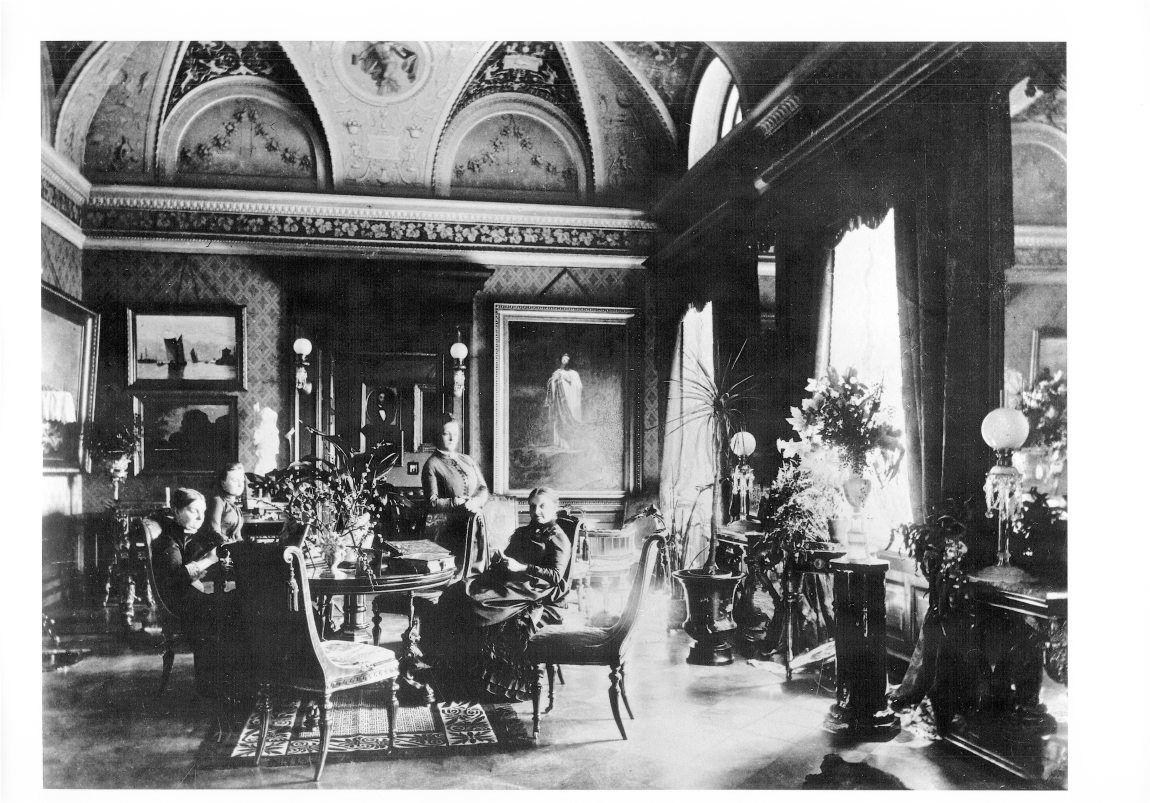
The Adler family, c. 1890

The property was acquired in 1873 by the businessman and politician David B. Adler who resided at No. 14 until 1878.

One of Adler's daughters, Ellen (1860–1930), married the physician and physiology professor Christian Bohr (1855–1911) in 1881. Their two sons, the Nobel Prize-winning physicist Niels Bohr and the mathematician Harald Bohr, were both born in the building.

=== 20th century ===
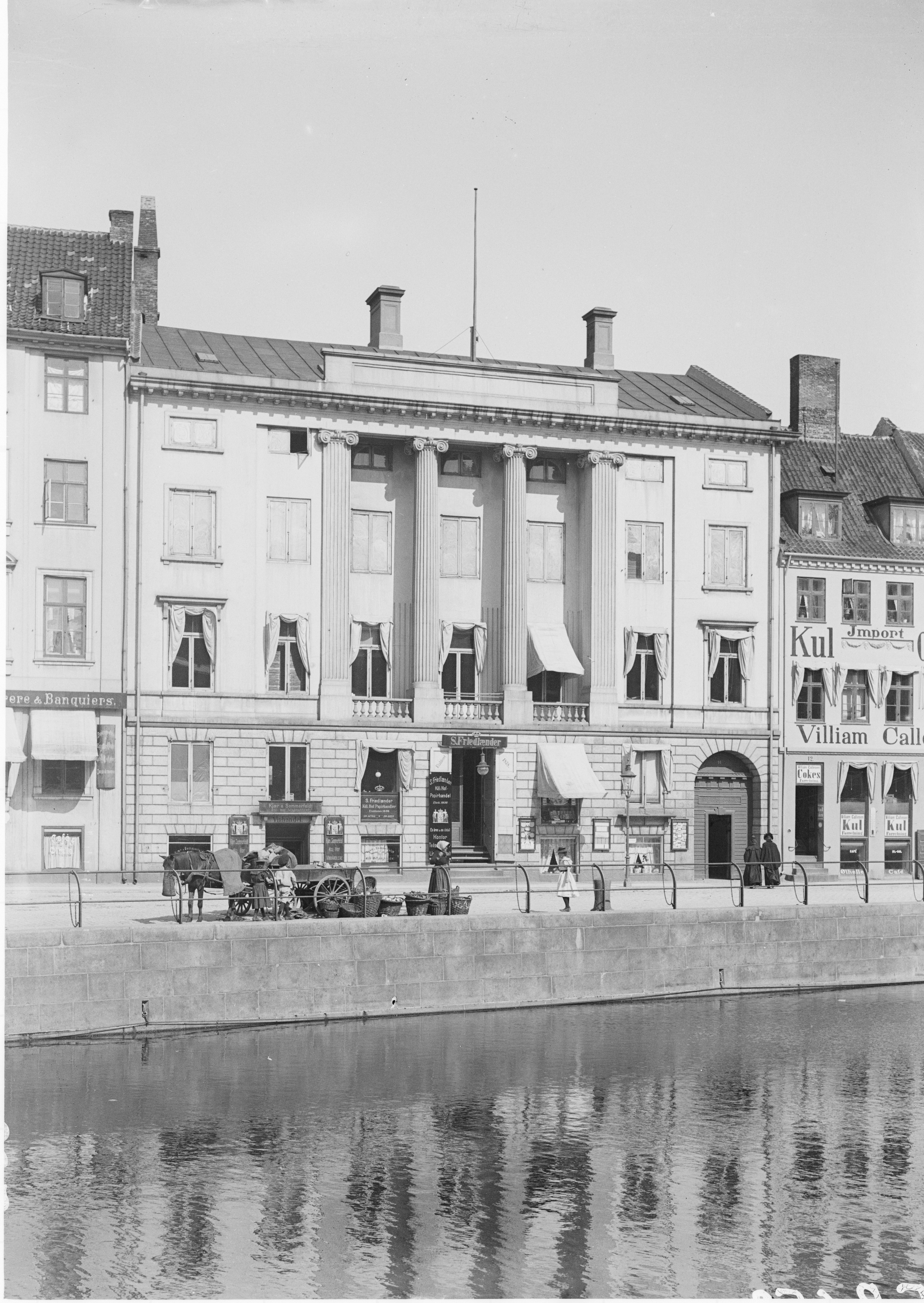
The building photographed in the early 1900s by Fritz Theodor Benzen

The house was owned by King George I of Greece from 1903 until his assassination in 1913. He was a son of Christian IX of Denmark and Louise of Hesse-Kassel.

The building later served as headquarters for Kjøbenhavns Brandforsikring.

== Architecture ==
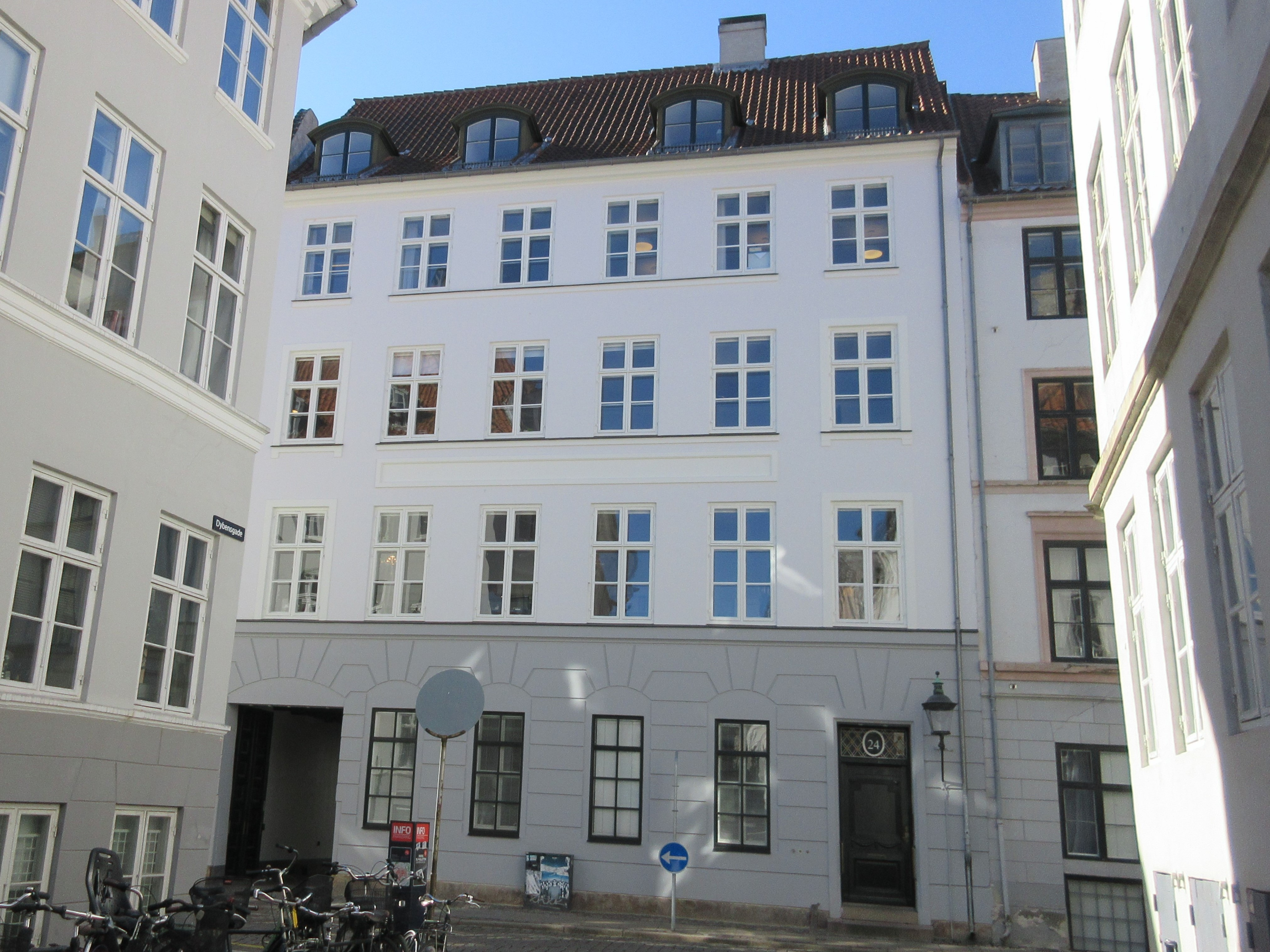
Admiralgade 24

The Neoclassical building is one of Copenhagen's first examples of a bourgeois residence with free-standing columns.

The property also includes two lateral wings which connect the main wing to a rear wing facing Admiralgade which served as warehouse for Gustmeyer's business. There is also a one-storey building in the central courtyard which dates from the same time as the rest of the complex.

== Today ==
The entire property was refurbished by royal building inspector David Bretton-Meyer for the consultancy McKinsey & Company in 1985–1986. The building is owned today by ATP Properties.
