= Johan Martin Quist =

Danish architect

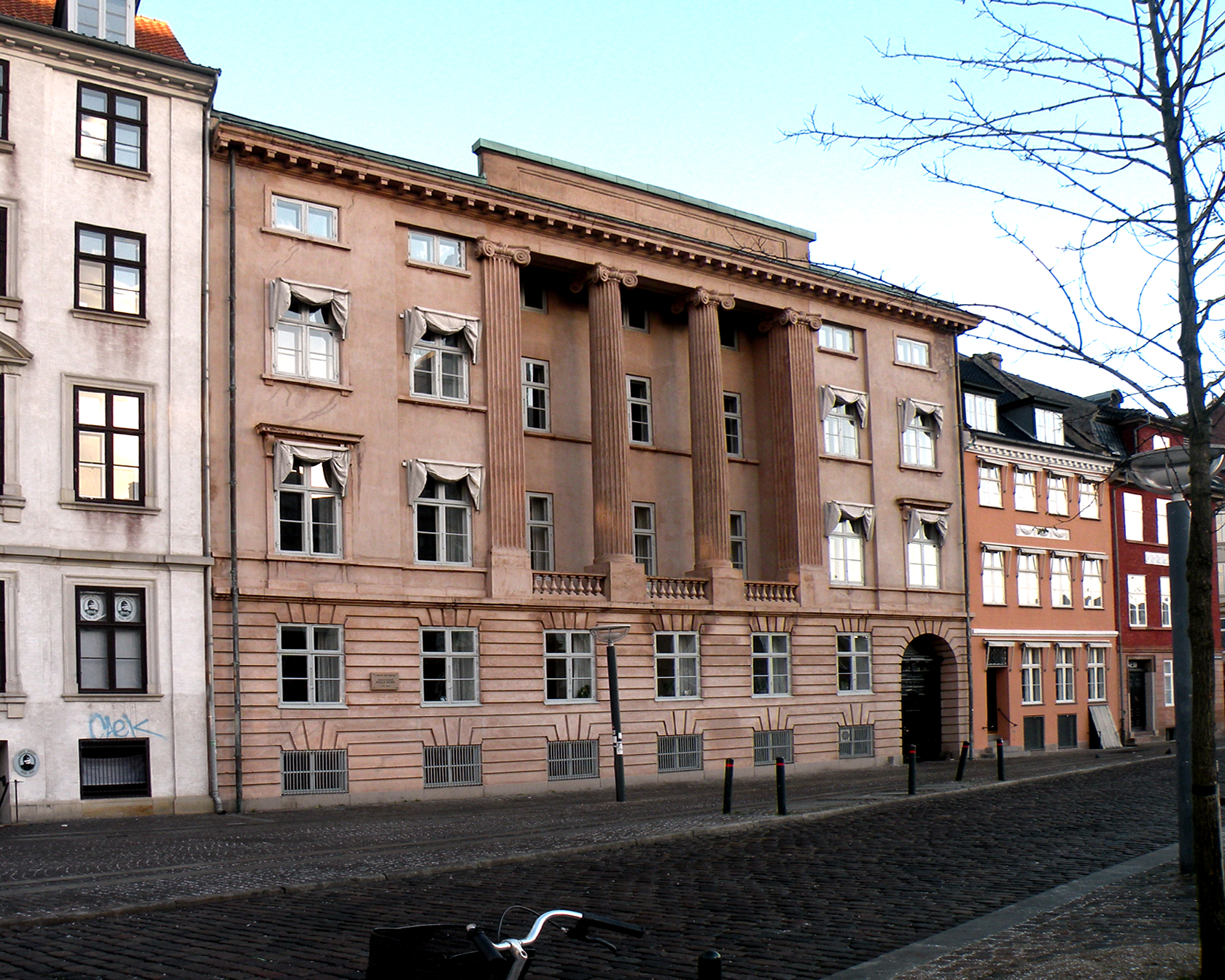
Gustmeyers Gaard, Ved Stranden, Copenhagen: Quist's masterpiece

Johan Martin Quist or Qvist (3 September 1755 – 25 April 1818) was a Danish architect who made a significant contribution to the city of Copenhagen. Together with those of Andreas Hallander, his classically styled buildings form part of the legacy of 19th-century Danish Golden Age architects who reconstructed areas of the old town which had been destroyed in the Copenhagen Fire of 1795.

His most important work is Gustmeyer House (Gustmeyers Gaard), located opposite Christiansborg Palace on Ved Stranden. Completed in 1797 for the well-to-do merchant, Frederik Ludolf Gustmeyer (1752–1804), it is one of Copenhagen's first bourgeois residences with free-standing columns. All Quist's surviving works are now listed buildings.

== Early life and education ==
Johan Martin Quist was born in Copenhagen, the son of Nicolaj Mathiessen Quist, a shoemaker, and Anna Marie Elisabeth Engelbrecht. After being trained as a mason, he studied at the Royal Danish Academy of Fine Arts under the influential Caspar Frederik Harsdorff, winning the large silver medal in 1775 and the small gold medal in 1781.

== Career ==
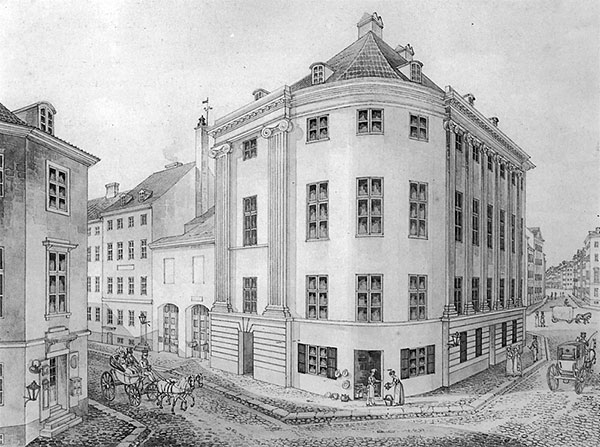
Frederik Tuteins House at the corner of Vimmelskaftet with Badstuestræde, built after the Fire of 1795

Quist was one of the Copenhagen builders who so quickly and effectively helped to reconstruct the areas of the old town which had been destroyed by the Copenhagen Fire of 1795. His imposing apartment buildings are inspired by Harsdorff's neoclassical style. He and his fellow builders formed a close-knit group, reinforced by their membership of the civil guard and fire corps. They married each other's daughters and widows and acted as godfathers at christenings. Huge fortunes were made as they bought plots of land, built them up and sold them again.

Quist's earliest recognised building is Lykkens Prøve in Vesterbro built 1790. The building later housed the Christiani Institut, a boys school operated by educator and priest Christoph Johann Rudolph Christiani (1761–1841). In line with Hardorff's own model on Kongens Nytorv, it was decorated with four fluted pilasters in the inset central section while the lateral sections were accentuated with sandstone balconies on the first floor.

After the great fire, building regulations called for buildings on street corners to be set back to provide more room for fire engines. Quist took advantage of the new rules by designing bow-shaped corners, for example in the building on the corner of Knabrostæde and Kompagnistræde in 1797. Two years later he built an even more effective corner house at 47 Vimmelskaftet where both facades boasted pilasters on three floors.

== Personal life ==
Quist married Cathrine Margrethe Otte(n) on 18 January 1785 in Copenhagen. The marriage was later dissolved. Quist died in Copenhagen on 25 April 1818 and was buried in Assistens Cemetery.

== Works ==
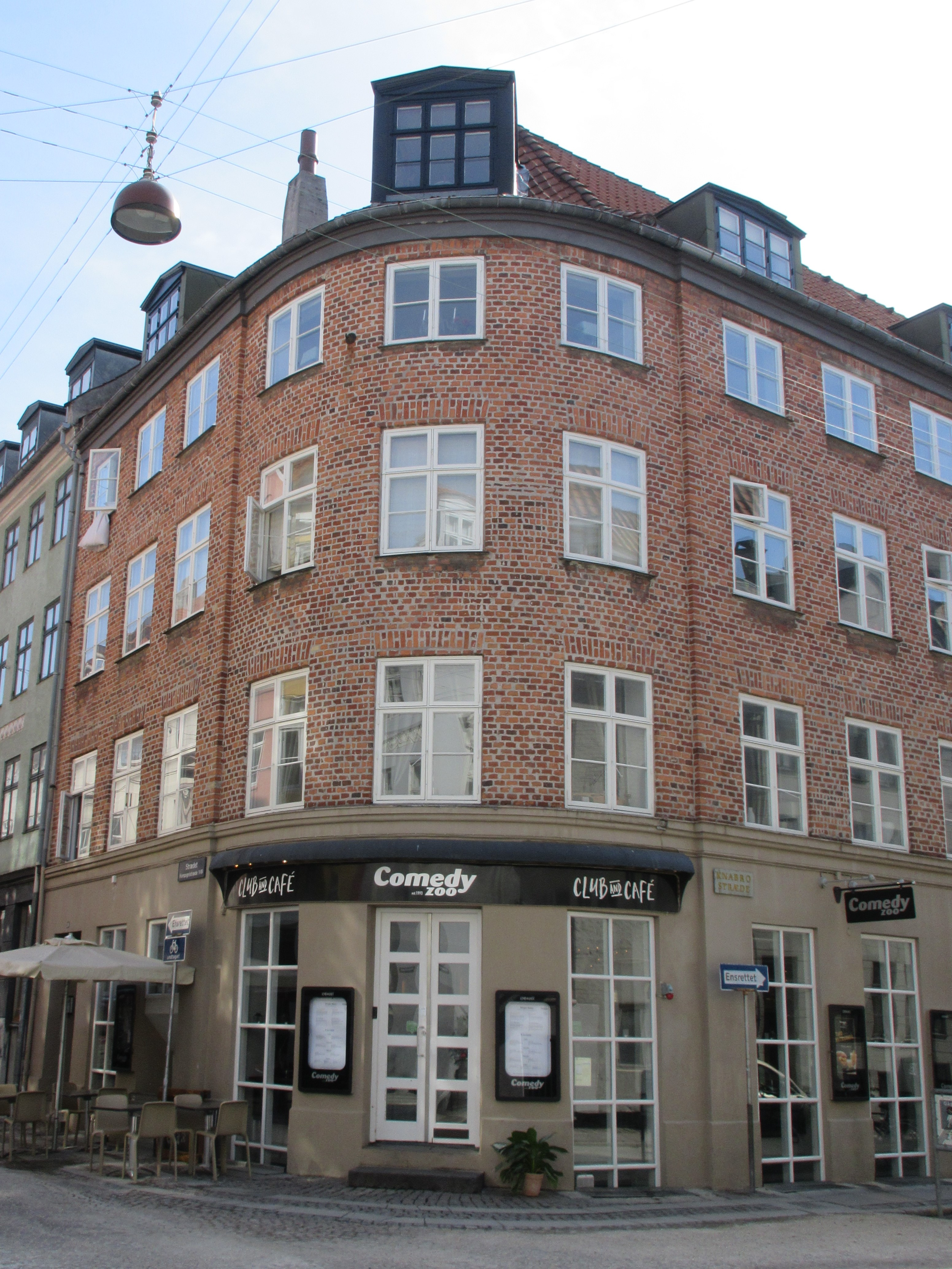
Knabrostræde 19

- Lykkens Prøve, Vesterbro, Copenhagen
- Amaliegade 43, Copenhagen (1790 – completed by Andreas Hallander in 1792–1793)
- Tutein House, Badstuestræde 2 / Vimmelskaftet 47, Copenhagen (1800–1801)
- Waagepetersen House, Store Strandstræde 18 (1792–1793)
- Gustmeyer House, Ved Stranden 14, Copenhagen (1796)
- Knabrostræde 19 / Kompagnistræde 19, Copenhagen (1797)
- Studiestræde 27–29, Copenhagen (1797)
- Knabrostræde 21, Copenhagen (1797)
- Kronprinsessegade 6, Copenhagen (1803–1804)
- Kronprinsessegade 8, Copenhagen (1803–1804)
- Kronprinsessegade 10, Copenhagen (1803–1804)
- Kronprinsessegade 14, Copenhagen (1805–1806)
- Kronprinsessegade 16, Copenhagen (1806–1807)
- Kronprinsessegade 18, Copenhagen (1807–1813)
- Snaregade 10, Copenhagen (1806–1808)

== See also ==
- Architecture of Denmark
