= Kronprinsessegade 14 =

Building in Copenhagen

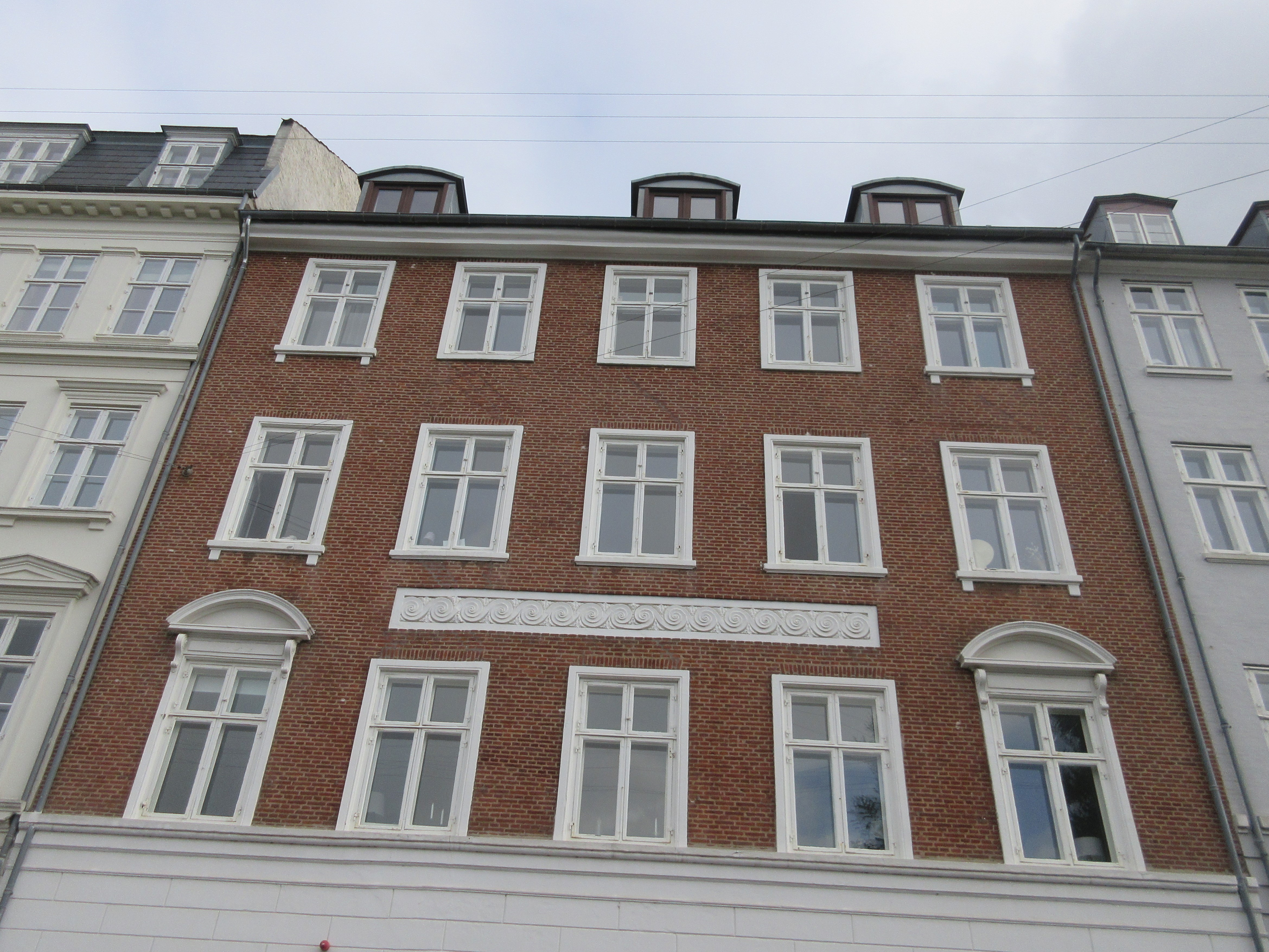
- Interactive map of the Kronprinsessegade 14 area

General information
- Location: Copenhagen, Denmark
- Coordinates: 55°41′0.32″N 12°34′53.61″E
- Completed: 1806

Design and construction
- Architect: Johan Martin Quist

Kronprinsessegade 14 is a Neoclassical property overlooking Rosenborg Castle Garden in central Copenhagen, Denmark.

== History ==
=== Construction ===
The property was initially referred to as Lot 19A when Kronprinsessegade was created in c. 1800. The present building on the site was constructed by master builder Johan Martin Quist in 1805–6. The property was listed in the new cadastre of 1806 as No. 389 in St. Ann's West Quarter. It was still owned by Quist at that time.

The property was later owned by Supreme Court justice Hans Rosenkilde (1765–1837).

Claus Conrad Schwartz, a captain in the King's Regiment, resided in the third-floor apartment at the 1834 census. He lived there with his wife Karen Rasmine Baggesen, their five children (aged three to 13), two lodgers and one maid. Christen Petersen Estrup, a grocer (høker), resided in the basement with his wife Christine Petersen Estrup and their 10-year-old daughter.

=== Holm ===
In c. 1837, the property was bought by administrator of Huscreditkassen Carl Jacob Holm (1796–1875). In 1838, Christian Wilhelm Haagen rented the second floor apartment for an annual rent of 600 Danish rigsdaler. The first floor apartment was at the same time let out to rear admiral Ulrich Anton Schønheyder (1775–1858),

Carl Jacob Holm resided in the third-floor apartment at the time of the 1840 census. He lived there with his wife Johanne Henriette Kierulf (1798–1867), their six children (aged five to 19), a governess, one male servant and two maids. One of their sons were the later architect Hans Jørgen Holm. Anne Bolette Holm, Carl Jacob Holm's unmarried sister, resided on the same floor with the lodger Axel Niels Juel and one maid. Christian Vilhelm Haagen resided on the second floor with his wife Agathe Elisa Ketty Kornerup, their two children (aged 17 and 19), lodger Nicolay Valdemar Kornerup (jurist), one male servant and one maid. Ulrich Anton Schønheyder (1775 - 1858), a rear admiral, resided on the first floor with his wife Christiane Hansen, three of their children (aged 20 to 25), one male servant and two maids. Johan Belfour Rainal, a former military officer who now managed Fonden til Kunstens Opmuntring, resided in the ground-floor apartment with his wife Juliette Agnes Elisa Bauer, their five children (aged one to six), one male servant and two maids. Johan Henrich Dalbom, a master shoemaker, resided in the basement with his wife Anne Elisabeth Reese, their three children (aged six to 12), a shoemaker (employee) and a maid. Sophie Christine Simonsen (née Hansen), a barkeeper, resided in the basement with her four children (aged six to 12), a male servant and three lodgers.

Holm and his family still resided on the third floor at the 1845 census. Holm's tenants on the three other floors were also still the same.

Nicolaj Nyholm (1788–1874), a businessman (royal agent) and landowner (owner of Schaarupgaard, Pedersholm and Oxholm), resided in the ground-floor apartment at the 1850 census.

=== Cornelius Stau ===
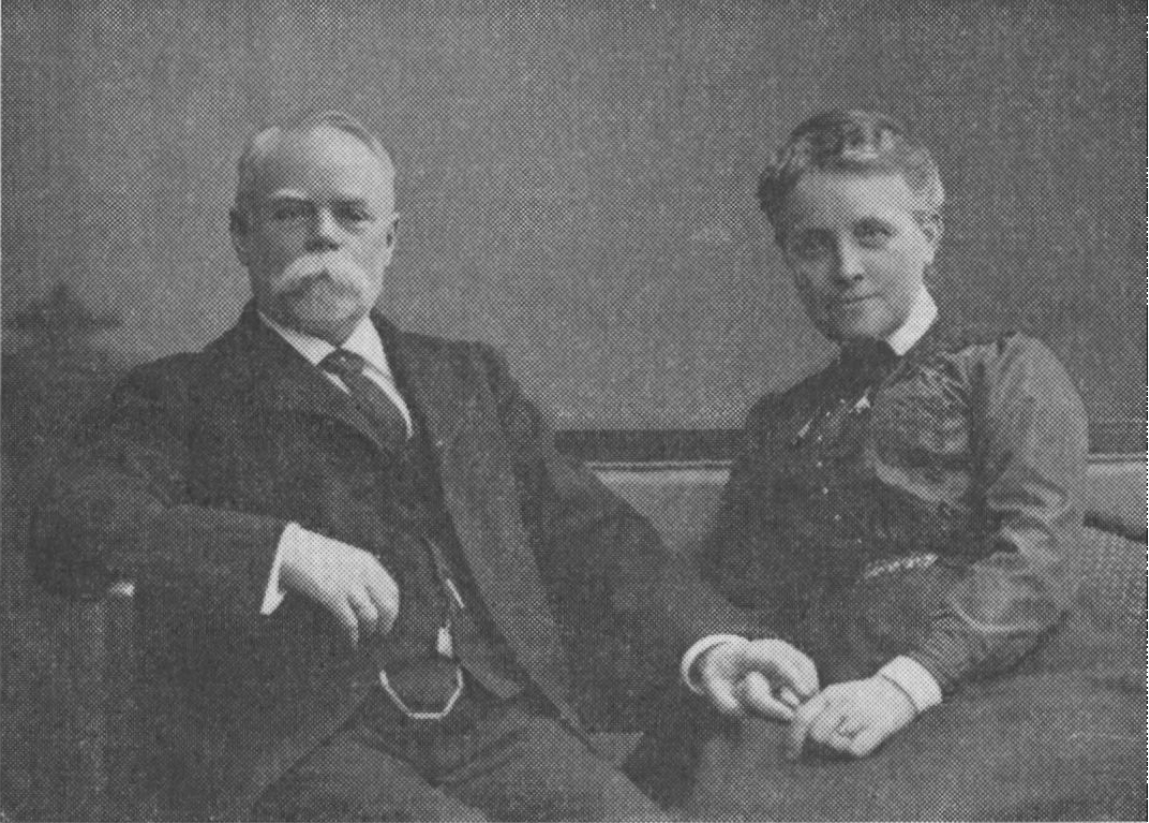
Cornelius and Frederikke Stau.

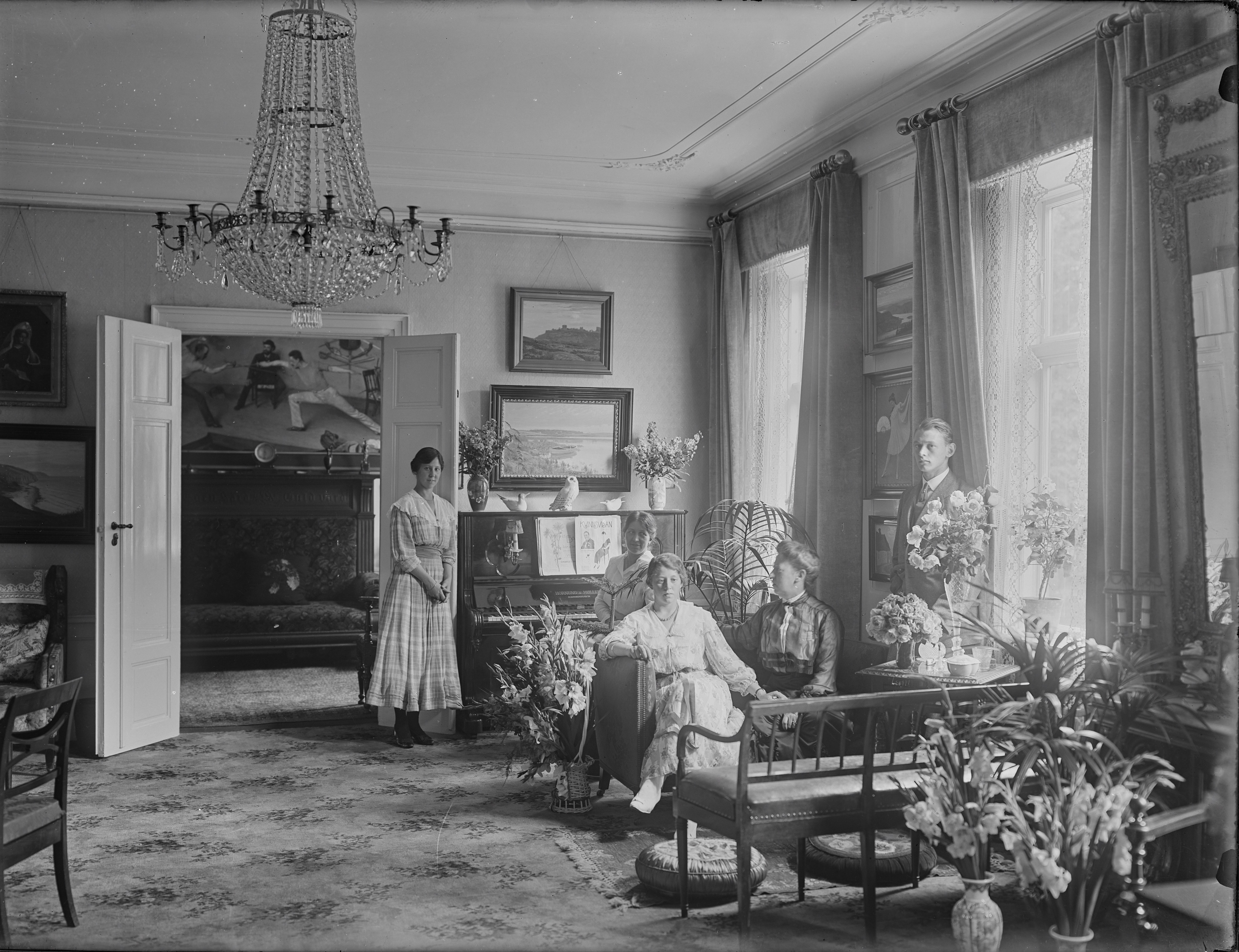
Dr. Cloed-Hansens's home in 1916.

In 1899 the property was acquired by wholesale merchant (grosserer) Cornelius Stau. He had founded his own trading firm in Vesterbro 1880. It had later moved to first Amagertorv, then Silkegade and finally Østergade before being relocating to his new property in Kronprinsessegade. Stau is today remembered for founding Varde Museum. In the 10++s, he established the canned food factory Danica in the 1900s. He also establish Dansk-Engelsk Biiscuitfabrik in partnership with his brother Christian Stau. Management of the latter company was later taken over by Christian Stau Jr.. One of Christian Stau's daughters married Niels Sholtz. He had previously managed a plantation in Siam but succeeded his father-in-law as mager of C. Stau & Co. He and his wife resided in the third-floor apartment at Kronprinsessegade 14.

The businessman Johan Frederik Christian Nissen-Sommersted resided in the second-floor apartment upon his return to Denmark from Sankt Petersburg in 1891. He later moved to the villa at Carit Etlars Vej 3 in Frederiksberg.

Dr. Cloed-Hansens resided in one of the apartments in the 1910s.

== Architecture ==
The building consists of four storeys over a high cellar and is five bays wide. The ground floor is dressed while the three upper floors stand in blank, red blrick. The outer windows on the first floor are topped by rounded pediments supported by corbels. There is a frieze between the three central windows of the first and second floors.

== Today ==
3B is based in the building.

== Gallery ==
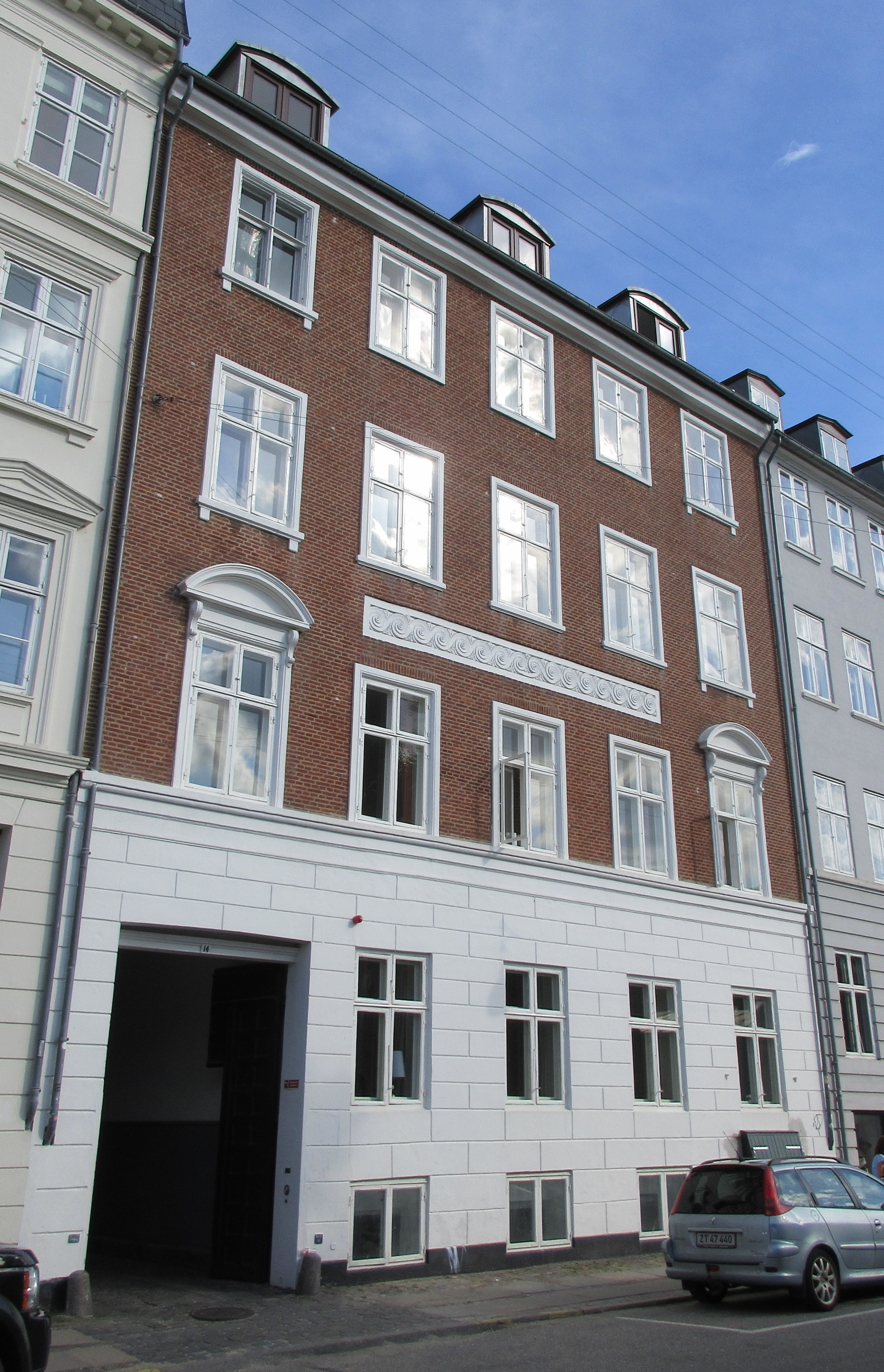

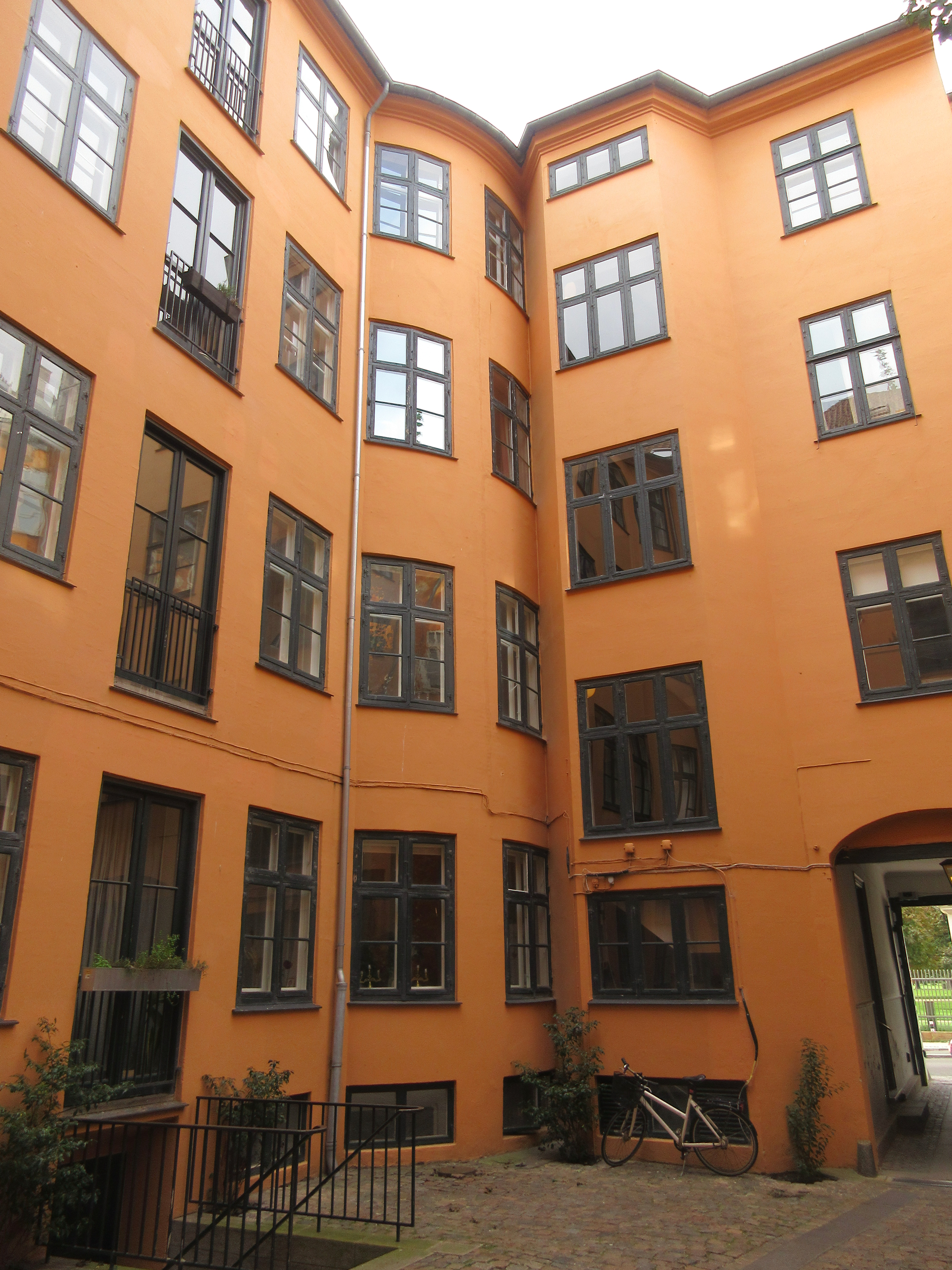
The building seen from the courtyard.
