= Knabrostræde 19 =

Listed building in Copenhagen

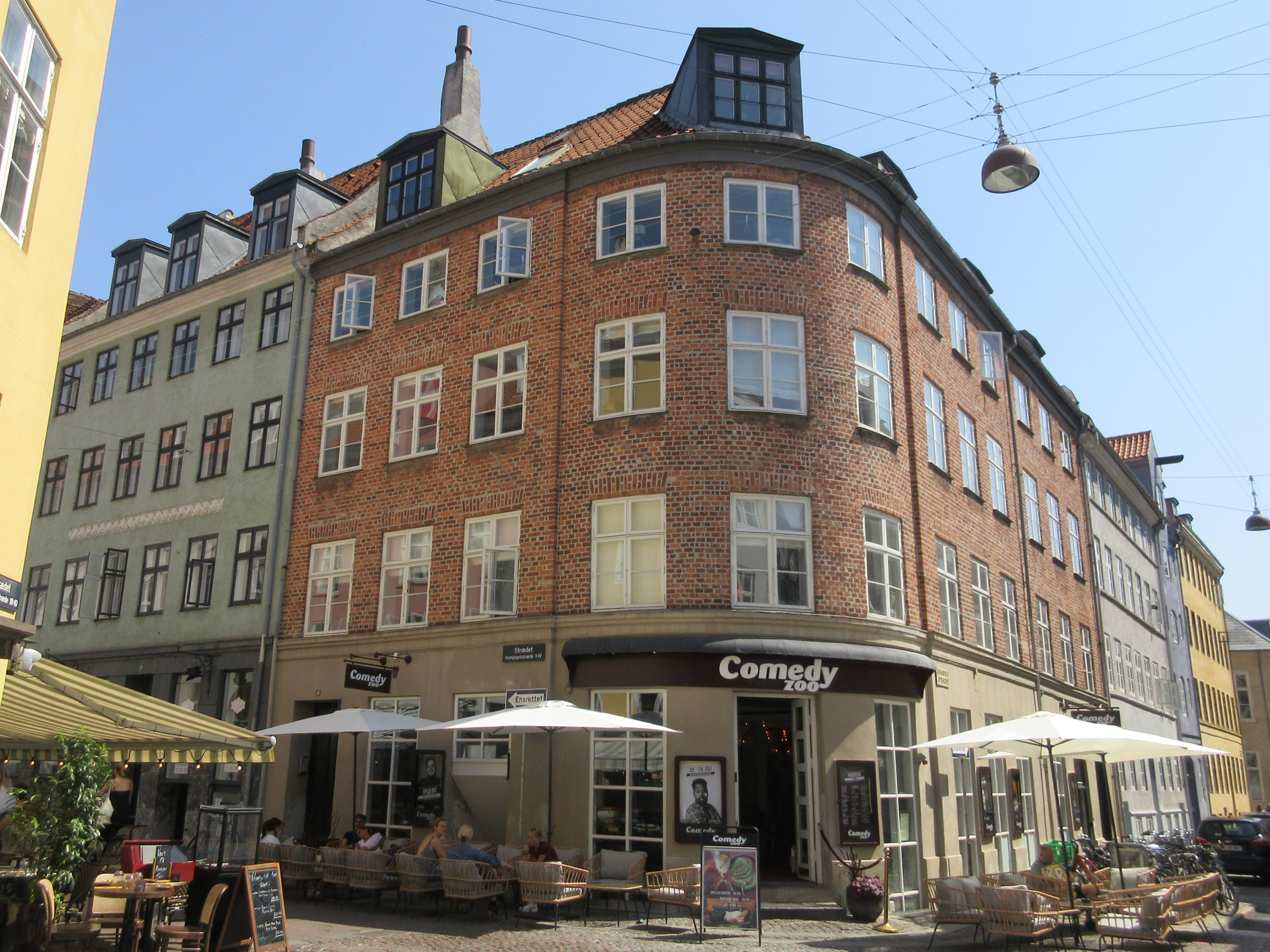
- Interactive map of the Knabrostræde 19 area

General information
- Location: Copenhagen, Denmark
- Coordinates: 55°40′37.31″N 12°34′32.52″E
- Completed: 1798
- Renovated: 1989

Design and construction
- Architect: Johan Martin Quist

Knabrostræde 19 is a Neoclassical property situated at the corner of Knabrostræde and Kompagnistræde in the Old Town of Copenhagen, Denmark. It was constructed by Johan Martin Quist as part of the rebuilding of the city following the Copenhagen Fire of 1795. The building was listed in the Danish registry of protected buildings and places in 1918. Comedy Zoo, Copenhagen's leading comedy club, is based in the building. Notable former residents include the musician and composer Ivar Bredal and the architectural painter Niels Bredal.

== History ==
=== 117th and 18th centuries ===
In the middle of the 17th century the property belonged to Icelandic merchant and brewer Rasmus Hansen Munk (-1670). In 1655, he was elected as alderman of the Brewers Guild. He was also elected as one of the city's 32 Men when the first election took place on 14 April 16589. He also owned two small residences in Magstræde and a large undeveloped lot at Vandkunsten. He died in 1670. The property and associated brewery was after Munk's death passed to his son Morten Munk )1647-). His property was listed in Copenhagen's first cadastre of 1689 as No. 54 in Snaren's Quarter. On 16 December 1691, he was elected as one of the city's 32 Men. On 3 July 1711, he was awarded the title of kommerceråd. On 24 July 1713, he was appointed as Supreme Court justice. He died on 8 April 1724. He was married two times.

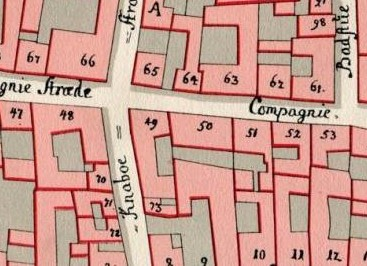
No. 49 seen on a detail from Christian Gedde's map of Snaren's Quarter, 1757.

A later owner of the property was Herman Jacobsen Gamst(1701-1755). He was raised in Store Fuglede Rectory as the son of the local pastor Jacob Christensen Gamst (1651-1709). He had initially been trained as a barber/surgeon before settling as a merchant in Odsherred. On 12 July 1751, he was licensed as a brewer in Copenhagen. Gamst died in 1755. His widow Margrethe Kirstine Jacobsdatter Juel (c- 1716 – 1771) continued the brewery until at least 1768.

The building was prior to the 1787 census acquired by brewer Jens Michelsen Hostrup. He was at that time residing on his property with his wife Jens Michelsen Hostrupm their two sons (aged two and six), his mother-in-law Anna Maria Holm, the 18-year-old relative Mette Kirstine Gregersen, one brewer (bryggersvend), One brewer's apprentice (bruggerknægt), a caretaker and two maids. Hostrup was originally from Mariager. His paternal uncle Jens Andersen Hostrup (c. 1712–1784) owned a brewery in Brolæggerstræde. Jens Michelsen Hostrup died in 1791. Dorthea Christine Hostrup was the following year married to the book printer J.F. Schultz (1756-1817), He was the owner of a property at Højbrostræde 64 (now Højbro Plads 4).

The property in Knabrostræde was destroyed in the Copenhagen Fire of 1795, together with most of the other buildings in the area. The current buildings on the site was constructed in 1797-98 by Johan Martin Quist.

=== 19th century ===
The property was shortly after its completion sold to distiller Johan Christensen. At the time of the 1801 census, it was home to 21 residents in four households. Johan Christensen resided in one of the apartments with his wife Johan Christensenm their two daughters (aged one and three), a distillery worker and a maid. Lauritz Stang (1775-1838), a Norwegian trainee (volontør) in the central administration, resided in another apartment with his wife Johanne Conradi, their one-year-old daughter, the wifeøs sister Caroline Stang and two maids. Johan Forsten, a musician, resided in a third apartment with his wife Marinette Holm, their five-year-old daughter and a maid. Christine Beck, a 48-year-old widow, resided in the basement with a three-year-old girl in her care, one maid and three lodgers.

The property was listed as No. 51 in the new cadastre of 1806. It was at that time still owned by Johan Christensen.

At the time of the 1840 census, No. 51 was home to just 12 people. Johannes Mesle?? Melbye, a merchant (urtekræmmer), resided on the ground floor with his wife Magdalene Ernstine Louise (née Erichsen), their 24-year-old daughter Johanne Lovise Melbye and one maid. The other residents were eight lodgers and one maid on the second floor. Most of the lodgers were students. The lodger Fritz Adolph Schmiegelow (1819-1862) would later serve as pharmacist in Rønne on Bornholm.

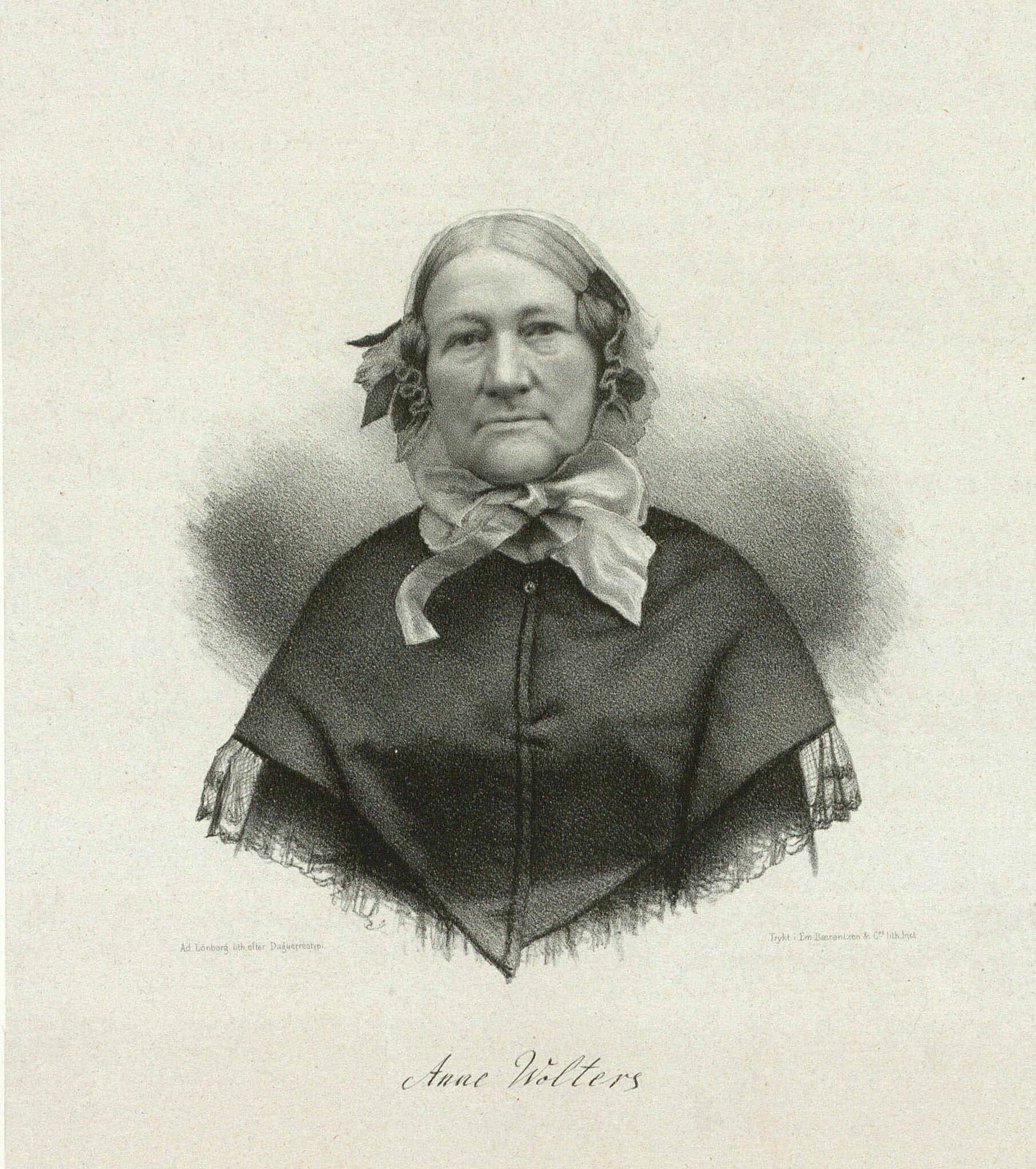
Anne Kirstine Wolters

At the time of the 1845 census, No. 51 was home to three households. Melbye was still residing on the ground floor with his wife and daughter in 1845. Ivar Bredal, a musician and composer, resided on the first floor with his three children (aged four to seven), a housekeeper and a maid. His then four-year-old son Niels Bredal would later become a painter. Ane Kirstine Wolters (1788-1861), widow of customs inspector in Frederikshavn H. J. Wolters, resided on the second floor with her two children (aged 18 and 21), Kammerjunker Peter Thestrup, four lodgers and one maid.

The ground floor had by 1850 been converted into a tavern. The proprietor H. Petersen and his wife Marie resided with a maid in the associated dwelling. I.D. Engmann, a helmsman (sætteskipper), resided in the basement with his wife I. H. Engmann and their five children (aged five to 15).

When house numbering by street was introduced in 1859, as a supplement to the old cadastral numbers by quarter, No. 51 became listed as Knabrostræde 10 and Kompagnistræde 19.

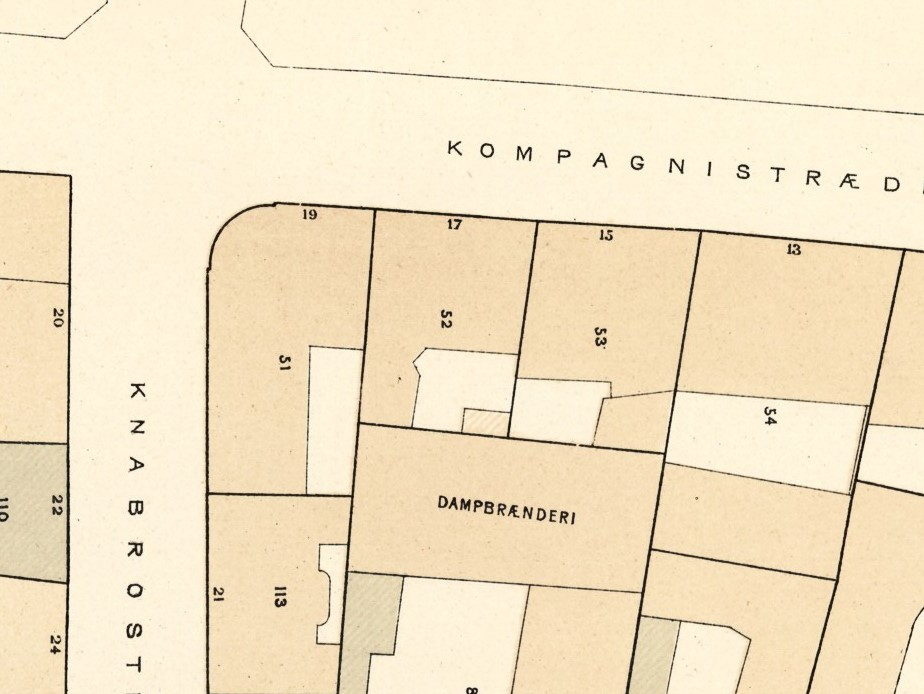
Knabrostræde 19 seen on a detail from Berggreen's cadastral map of Snaren's Quarter, 1884.

At the time of the 1860 census, No. 51 was home to 39 residents in six households. Ole Christiansen, a greengrocer, resided in the basement with his wife Marie Christiansen, their five children (aged two to 11) and one maid. Wilhelm Ausberg Heé, a master shoemaker, resided on the first floor with his wife Jacobine Wilhelmine Heé and their three children (aged three to 12). Peter Gustav Wilhelm Nyman, a helmsman (bådfører), resided in one of two dwellings on the second floor with his wife Marie Sophie Katrine and their five children (aged five to 16). Hanne Bagger, a 58-year-old unmarried woman resided in the other second floor dwelling with the cooper Peter Andreas Holm, the cooper's wife Ida Magrete Holm and their three children (aged 16 to 19). Marie Lyngby and her 24-year-old son Carl August Lyngby shared one of two dwellings on the third floor with the office clerk Moses Philipsen and his wife Jette Philipsen. Jensine Jensen, Marie Holst and Hansine Paulin Muller—three unmarried women occupied with needlework—resided in the other dwelling on the third floor.

=== 20th century ===
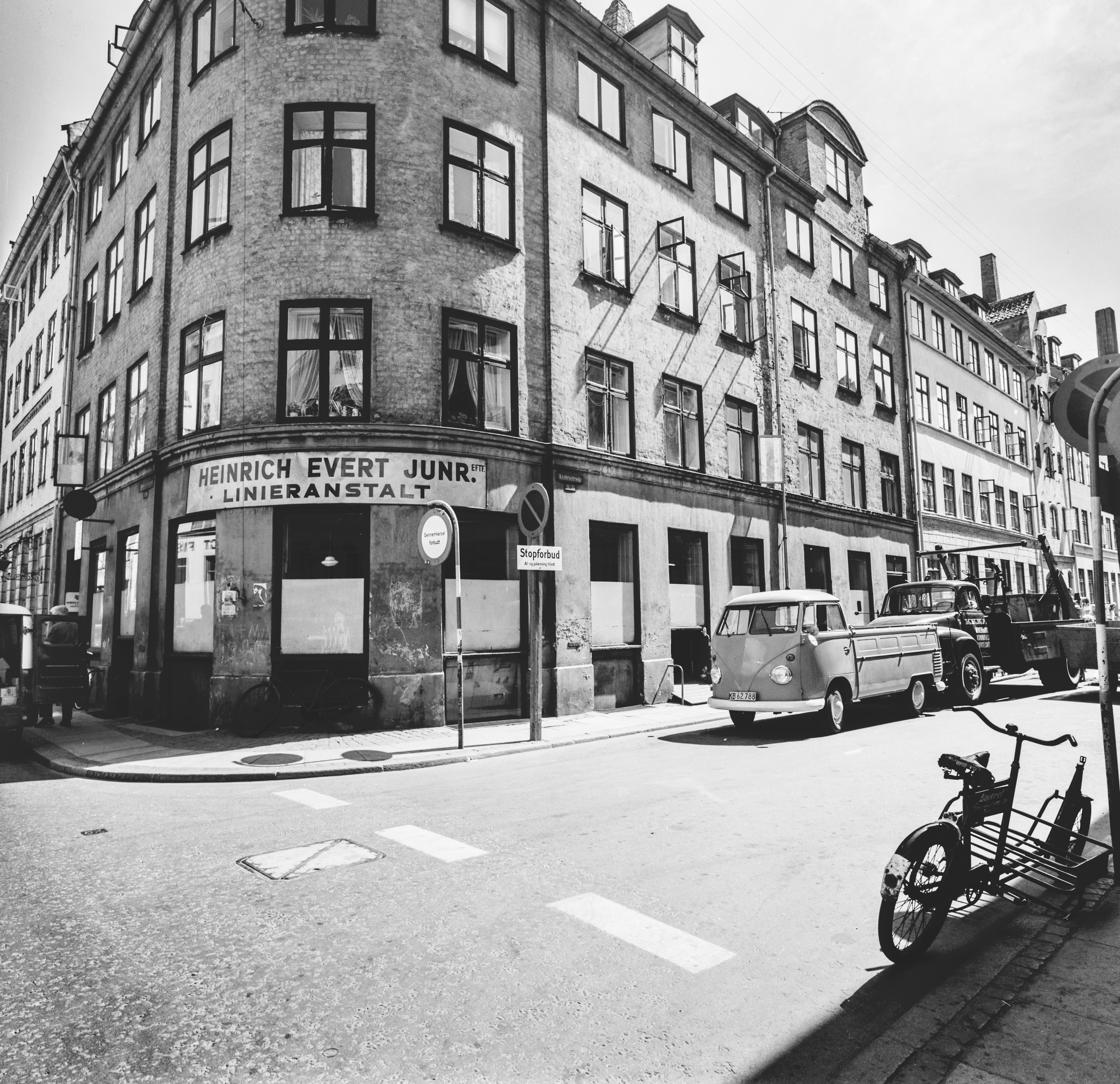
Knabrostræde 19 in 1963.

An art house cinema, Delta Bio, opened in the building in 1977. It closed in 1993.

In 1998, Comedy Zoo, Denmark's first comedy club, relocated from Baron Boltens Gård to the cinema's former premises at Knabrostræde 19. In 2018, Comedy Zoo was sold to the stand-up comedians Thomas Hartmann, Dan Andersen, Torben Chris, Anders Fjelsted, Michael Schøt and Comedy Zoo CEO Martin Bo Andersen.

== Architecture ==
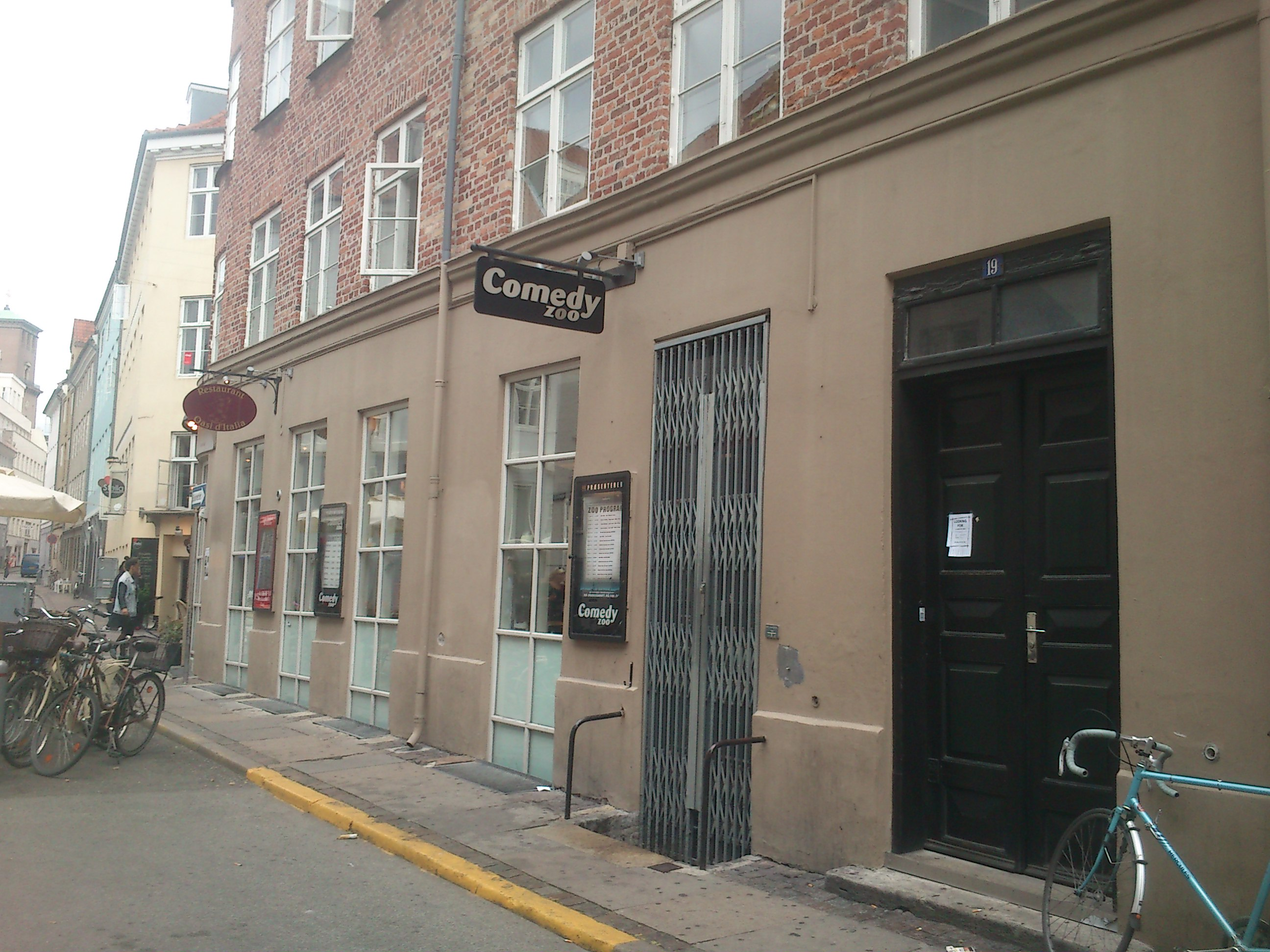
The main entrance in Knabrostræde.

Knabrostræde 19/Kompagnistræde 19 is a two-winged building, constructed in red brick with three storeys over a walk-out basement, with a six-bay facade on Knabrostræde, a three-bay facade on Kompagnistræde and a slightly inset three-bay bow-shaped corner. The bow-shaped corner was used by Quist in several of his buildings as an alternative to a chamfered corner, a tell-tale feature of building's from his time, still seen throughout inner Copenhagen, which was dictated for all corner buildings by Jørgen Henrich Rawert's and Peter Meyn's guidelines for the rebuilding of the city after the fire so that the fire department's long ladder companies could navigate the streets more easily. The ground floor is below a brown-painted belt course plastered and brown-painted, while the upper floors are in undressed brick. The facade is finished with a cornice painted in a dark grey colour. The pitched roof features five dormer windows towards the street. The roof ridge is pierced by two chimneys.

== Today ==
The property is owned by E/F Knabrostræde 19. Comedy Zoo, Copenhagen's leading venue for stand-up, is based on the ground floor and in the basement. There is one condominium on each of the upper floors. The one in the garret was created in 1980.

== Gallery ==
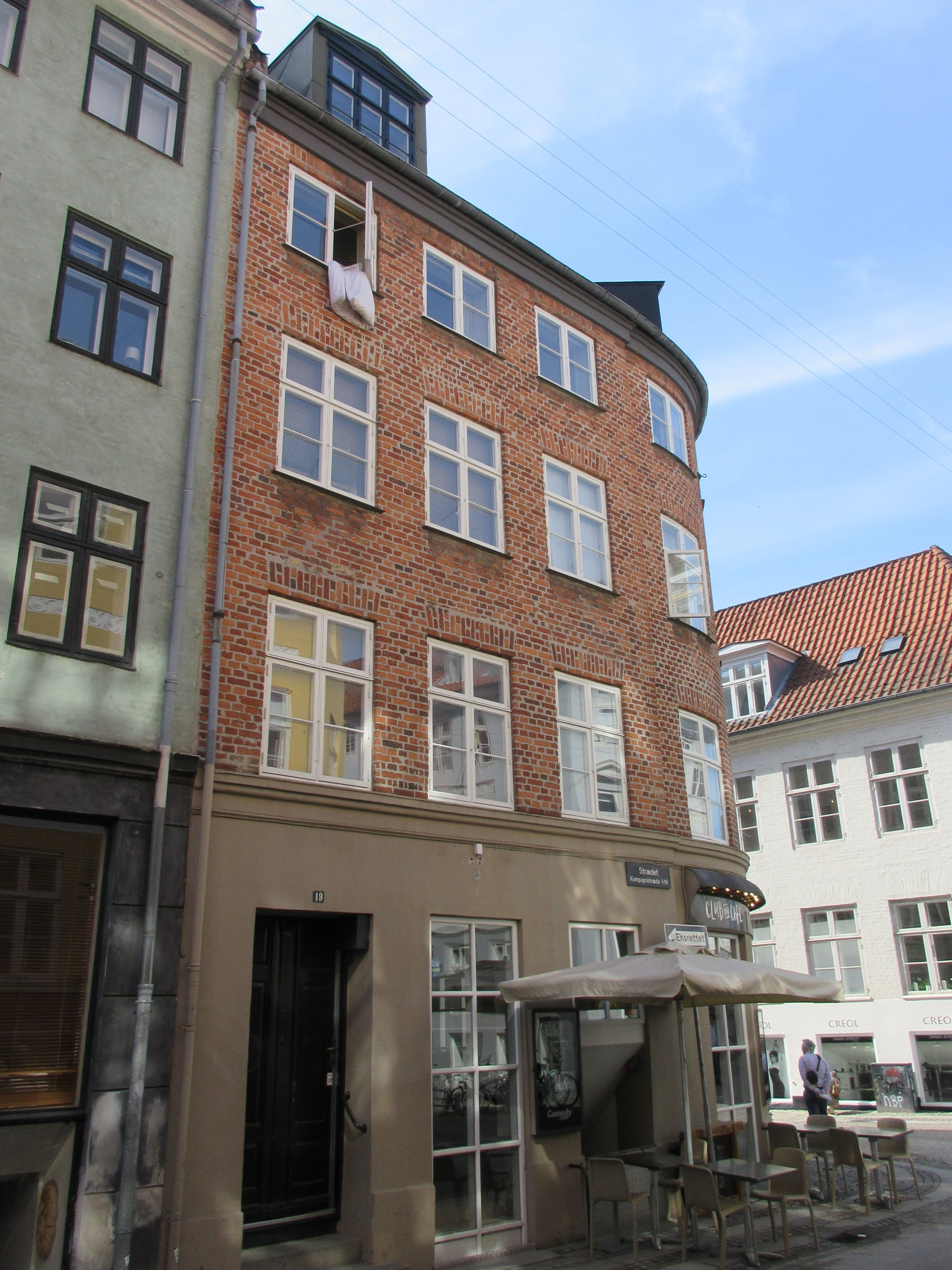
The facade on Kompagnistræde

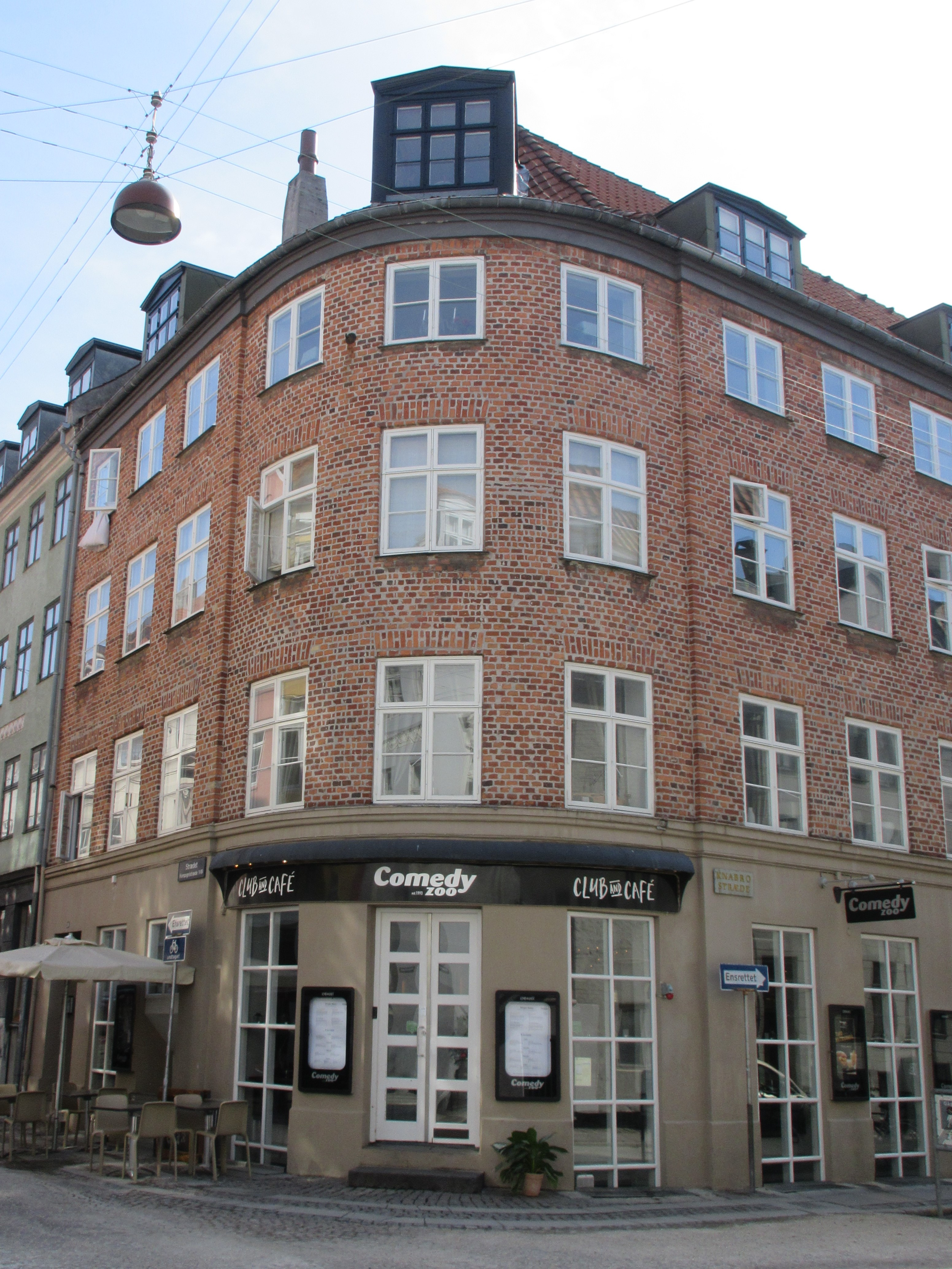
The corner.

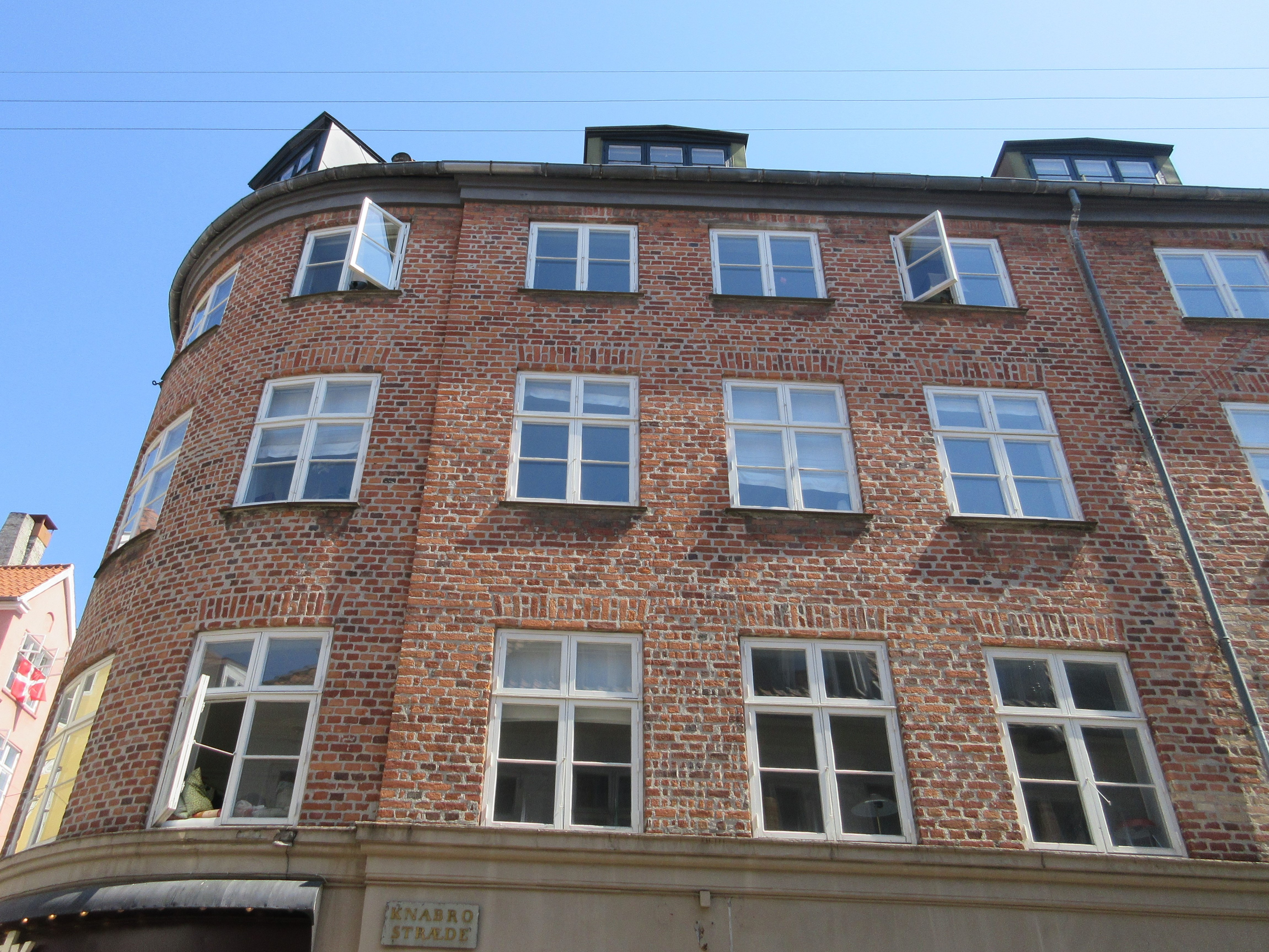
The facade on Knabrostræde
