= Ivar Bredal =

Danish composer and musician

Ivar Frederik Bredal (17 June 1800 – 25 March 1864) was a Danish composer and musician.

Son of Niels Iversen Bredal who was born in Bergen, but lived as a sign teacher and portrait painter in Copenhagen, Ivar Bredal played viola and 1817–1849 was a musician in the Royal Chapel from 1835. From 1849 to 1863, he was the choir master at the Royal Theater. He had no training in composition but he started to write for his own instrument, but had, like other composers of today, the ambition to write for the theater, or rather the opera.
