= Klerkegade =

Street in Copenhagen, Denmark

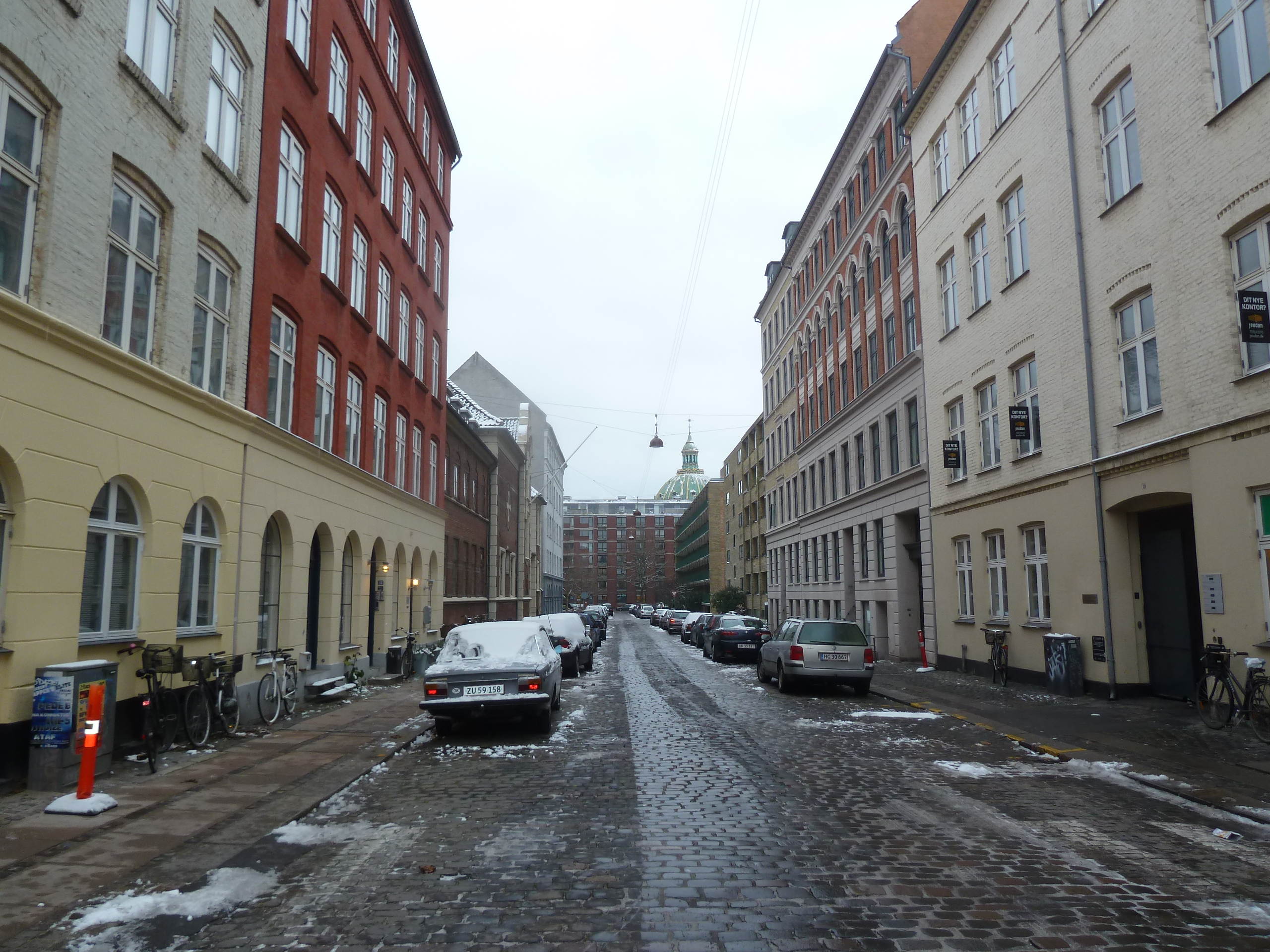
- Length: 316 m (1,037 ft)
- Location: Copenhagen, Denmark
- Quarter: Indre By
- Postal code: 1304, 1306
- Nearest metro station: Nørreport
- Coordinates: 55°41′11.4″N 12°35′6.36″E
- Southeast end: Borgergade
- Major junctions: Adelgade, Kronprinsessegade
- Northwest end: Rigensgade

Klerkegade (lit. "Clergy Street") is a street in central Copenhagen, Denmark. The street runs from Borgergade in the east to Rigensgade in the west, passing Adelgade and Kronprinsessegade on the way.

== History ==
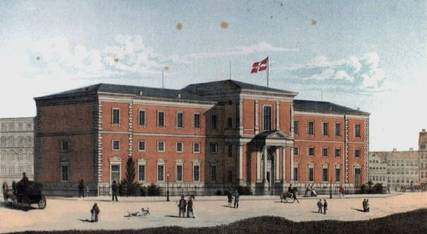
The Freemasons' Hall t No. 2 in 1881

Klerkegade originates in the 1649 plan for New Copenhagen, the large area which was included in the fortified city when the old East Rampart along present-day Gothersgade was decommissioned, and a new one was built in a more northerly direction. According to the plan, the streets in the area were to be named after Danish territorial possessions, royalty and the upper classes. The name Klerkegade is thus related to those of Adelgade ("Nobility Street") and Borgergade ("Burges Street").

The south side of the street was affected by the condemnations that occurred along Adelgade and Borgergade in the 1940s and 50s.

== Notable buildings and residents ==
No. 2 was built for the Freemasons between 1867 and 1869 to a design by Vilhelm Tvede. The building was replaced by the Freemasons' Hall on Blegdamsvej in 1927. For a while, in the 1930s, the building then served as a cinema under the name Palæbiografen. In 1972–74, Helge Bonnesen adapted the building for its current use as the home of the Section of Musicology at the University of Copenhagen.

No. 10 was built at the same time and by the same architect for another secret, philanthropical society, Kjæden ("The Chain"), founded by former members of the Order of Freemasons in 1776. The building was expanded in 1876 and again in 1883.

Den Wintherfeldtske Stiftelse was built by the foundation Trøstens Bolig to provide affordable accommodation for needy widows. The 19-bay-long building was constructed in two stages: the 13 eastern bays in 1838 and the six western bays in 1846–47. It was listed in 1978. In the courtyard to the rear of the building is a four-storey building, built at the same time as the extension and designed by Johann Heinrich Lütthans. It was built by another foundation, Den Treschowske Stiftelse
