= Dronningens Tværgade =

Street in Copenhagen, Denmark

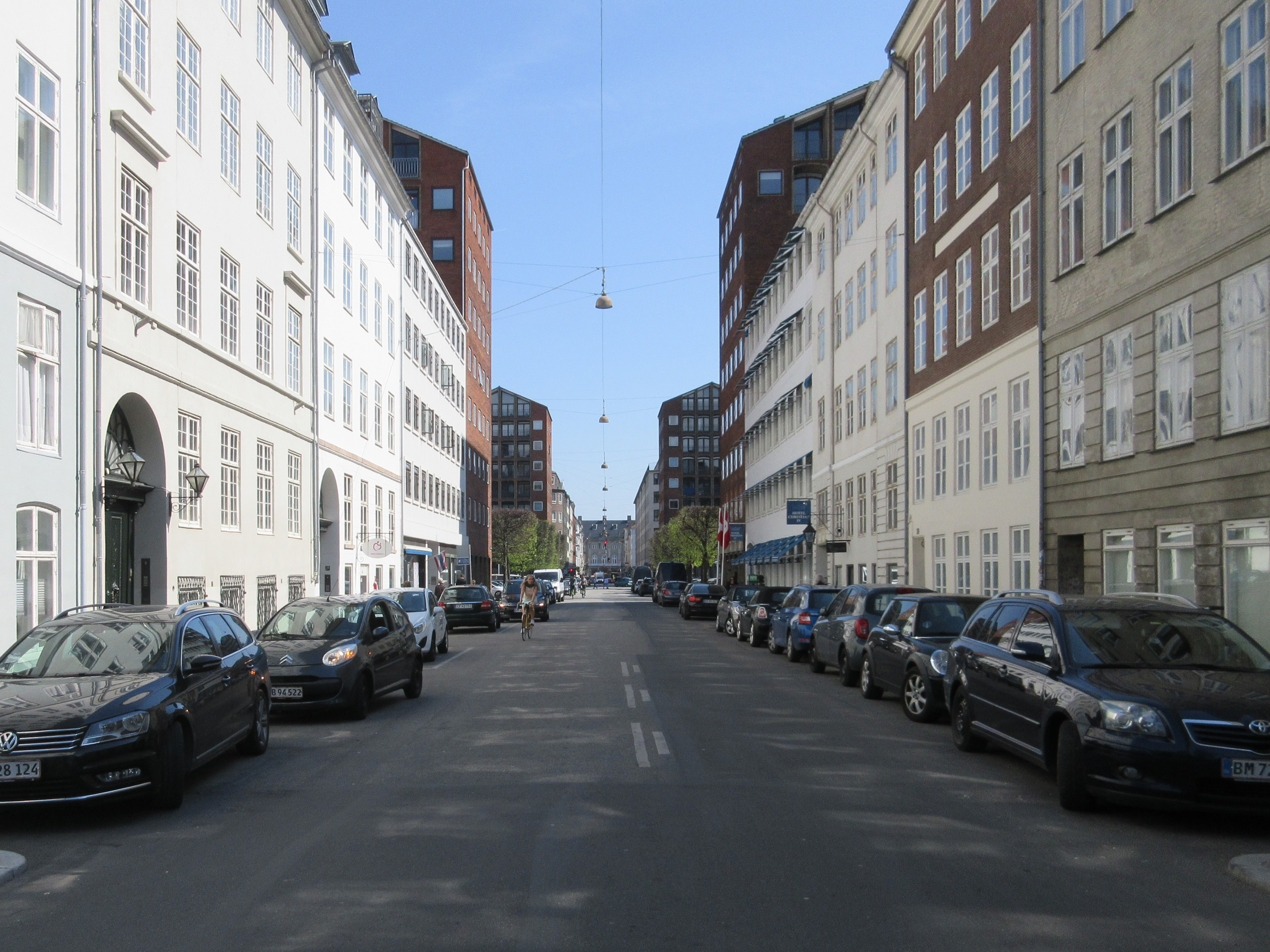
- Length: 458 m (1,503 ft)
- Location: Indre By, Copenhagen, Denmark
- Postal code: 1302
- Coordinates: 55°41′24″N 12°35′9.24″E

Dronningens Tværgade (lit. "The Queen's Cross Street") is a street in central Copenhagen, Denmark, which runs from Bredgade to Rosenborg Castle Garden. The street originally formed a link between the King's Garden (Rosenborg Castle Gardens) and the Queen's Garden. With the Odd Fellows Mansion on Bredgade and the central pavilions of the east fringe of the castle garden located at each their end, the street has axial qualities. These are accentuated by the Dronningegården Estate, a Functionalist housing complex from the 1940s, which forms an urban space around the intersection with Adelgade.

== History ==
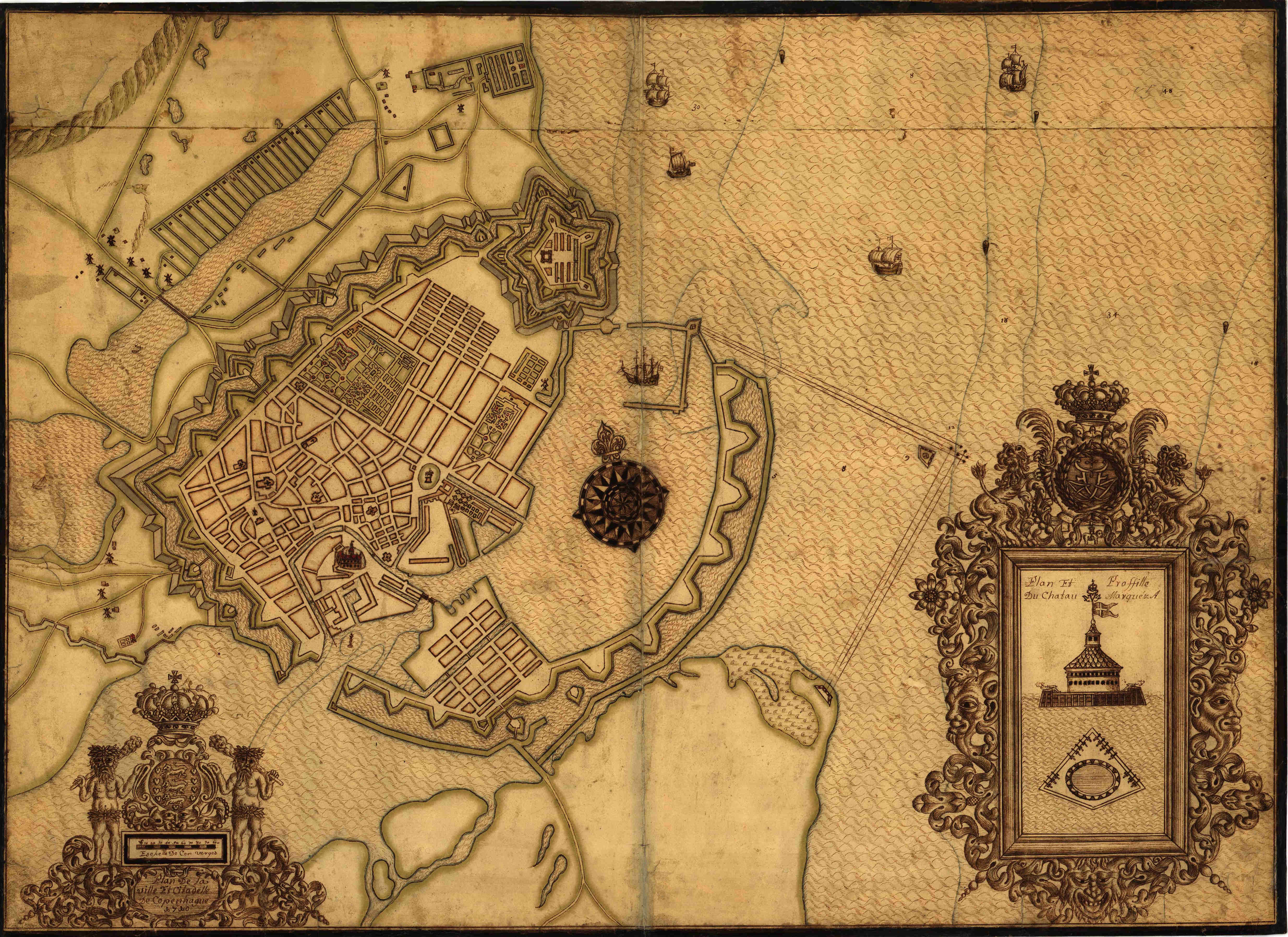
A map from 1710 showing the still relatively undeveloped New Copenhagen area with the large King's Garden and smaller Queen's Garden, connected by Dronningens Tværgade

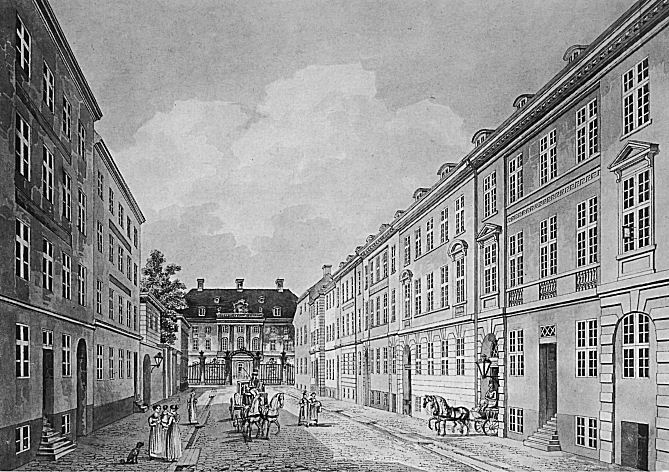
Dronningens Tværgade in c. 18230s

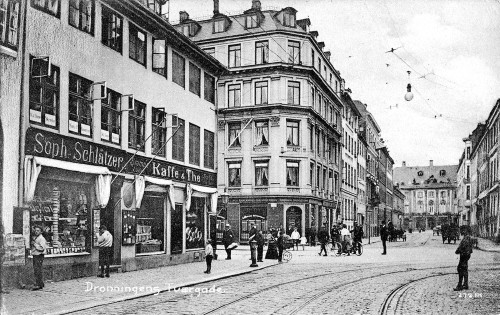
Dronningens Tværgade in the 1900s

Dronningens Tværgade originates in the 1649 plan for New Copenhagen, the large area which was included in the fortified city when the old East Rampart along present day Gothersgade was decommissioned and a new one was built in a more northerly direction. According to the plan, the streets in the area were to be named after Danish territorial possessions, royalty and the upper classes. Dronningens Tværgade, the Queen's Cross Street, was named after Queen Sophie Amalie, the consort of King Frederick III who had ascended the throne in 1648, and provided a direct connection between the King's Garden at Rosenborg and the future Queen's Garden at Sophie Amalienborg.

In the middle of the 18th century the eastern end of the street became part of Frederiksstaden while the western end passed through the neighbourhood around Borgergade and Adelgade which came to suffer from overpopulation and poverty and gradually fell into despair before it was demolished in the 1940s to make way for modern dwellings.

== Buildings ==
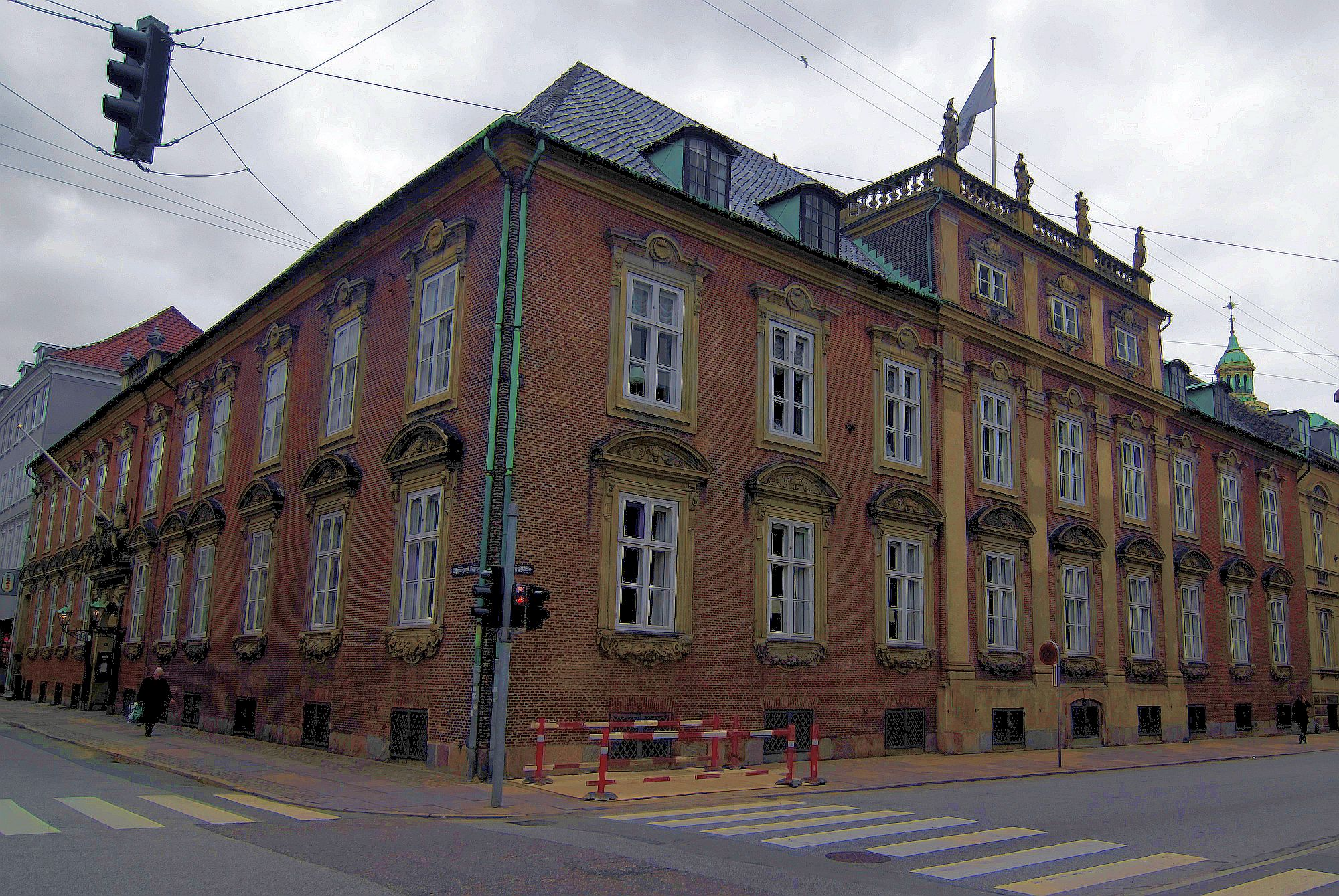
Moltke's Mansion on the corner of Bredgade

The oldest building on the street is currently known as Moltke's Mansion and takes its name from Adam Wilhelm Moltke who acquired it in 1852. It was, however, originally built for Ulrik Frederik Gyldenløve and was in that time known as Gyldenløve's Little Mansion. It was designed by Ernst Brandenburger and built between 1700 and 1702. No. 26 dates from before 1734.

The Dronningegården Estate, which was designed by Kay Fisker and built from 1943 to 1958, defines a distinctive urban space along the street.

== Cultural references ==
- Dronningens Tværgade is used as a location in the films Soldaten og Jenny (1947) and Englen i sort (1957).
- The street is also used as a location at 0:28:24 in the 1977 Olsen-banden film The Olsen Gang Outta Sight.
- Alex' (Nikolaj Lie Kaas apartment—which suddenly disappears—is located in Dronningens Tværgade In Christoffer Boe's Reconstruction..

== See also ==
- Gothersgade
- G. Halkier & Co.
