= Copenhagen Jewish Film Festival =

- Location: Gothersgade, Copenhagen, Denmark
- Website: www.cjff.dk

The Copenhagen Jewish Film Festival (CJFF) was first established in 1998 and takes place at the Danish Film Institute Cinemateque in Gothersgade, Copenhagen, Denmark.

The 2021 festival was held online from 21 February to 1 March. Previous festivals were held from 21 February to 1 March 2020, 27 January to 3 February 2019, 15 to 20 February 2018, 23 to 28 February 2016, 9 to 12 January 2014 and 20 to 23 May 2012.

The city of Copenhagen withdrew municipal support for the festival from 2019.
