= Adelgade =

Street in Copenhagen, Denmark

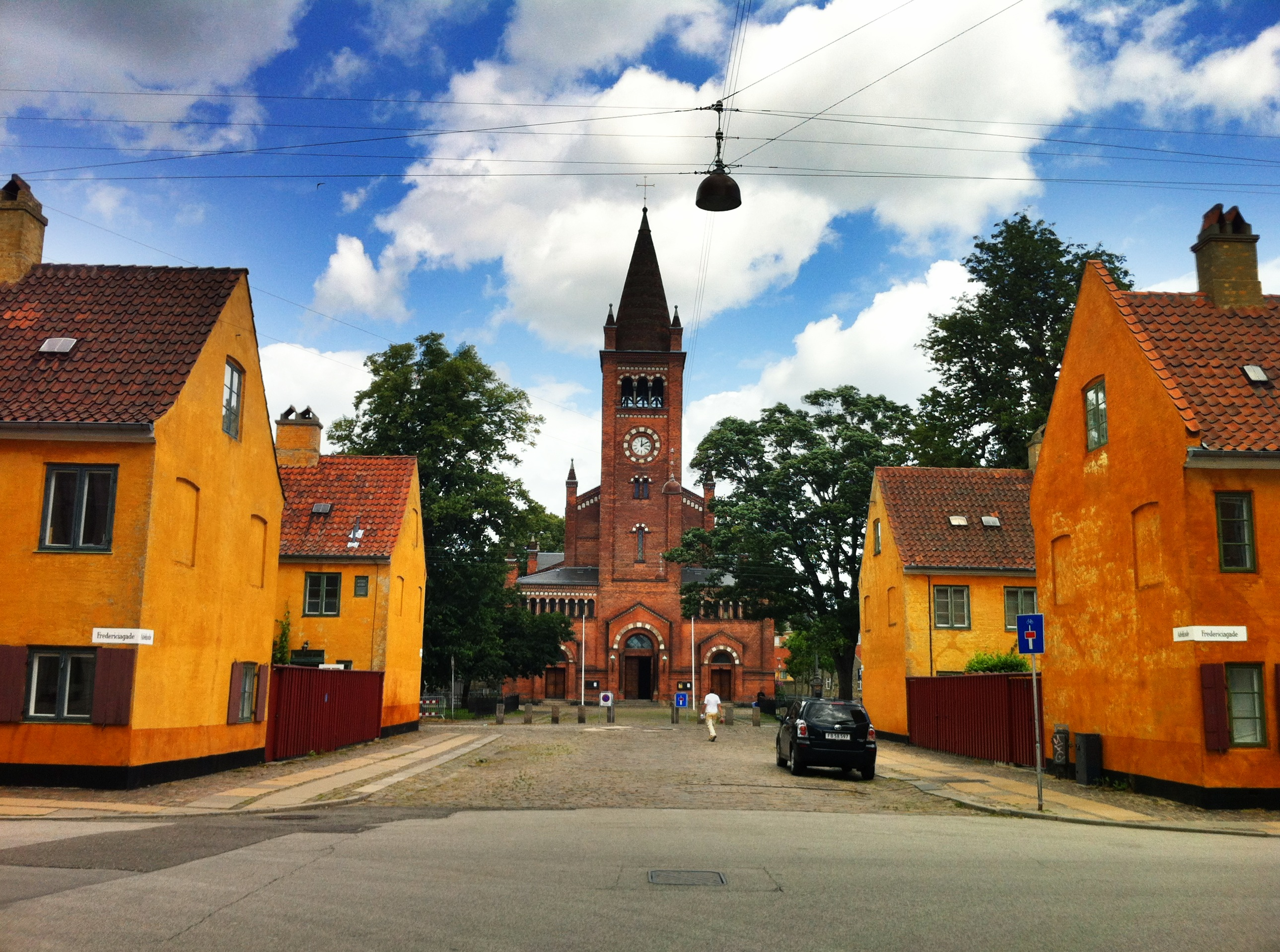
- The easternmost end of the street with St. Paul's Church
- Length: 345 m (1,132 ft)
- Location: Indre By, Copenhagen, Denmark
- Postal code: 1304
- Coordinates: 55°41′6.72″N 12°35′4.92″E

Adelgade (lit. "Nobility Street") is a street in central Copenhagen, Denmark. It runs from Gothersgade in the south to Sankt Pauls Plads with St. Paul's Church in the north. The first half of the street is dominated by modern buildings while its last section passes through the Nyboder district.

== History ==
Adelgade originates in the 1649 plan for New Copenhagen, the large area which was included in the fortified city when the old East Rampart along present day Gothersgade was decommissioned and a new one was built in a more northerly direction. According to the plan, the streets in the area were to be named after Danish territorial possessions, royalty and the upper classes. The new district was spaciously planned with long straight streets. The most affluent families settled along Bredgade and Ny Kongensgade while the area around Adelgade and Borgergade catered to a more modest clientele, typically craftsmen and shop-keepers. The buildings were generally half-timbered and relatively small, and living conditions were still considerably better than in the crowded city centre.

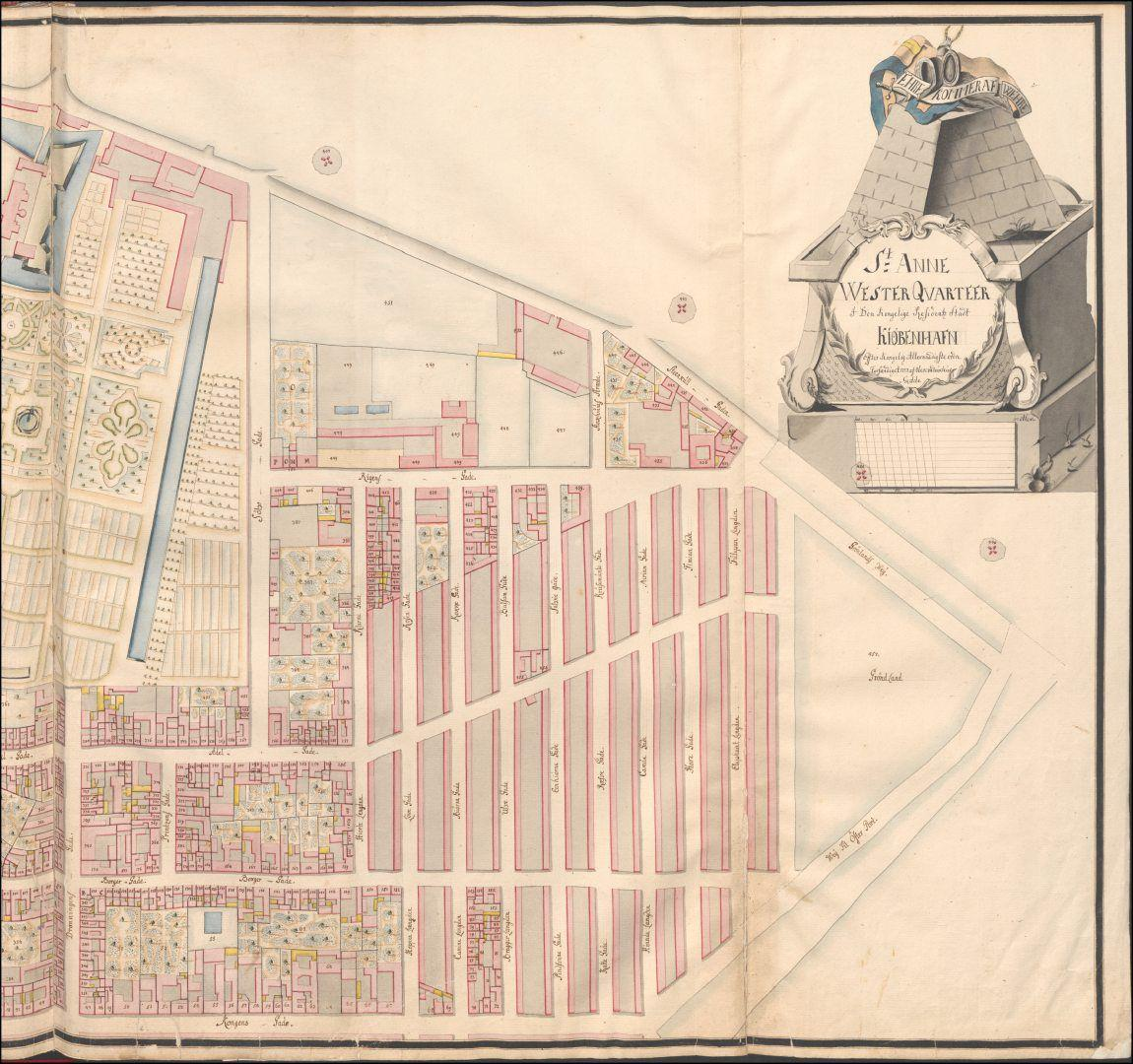
Christian Gedde's 1757 map of St. Ann's West Quarter: Borgergade is the horizontal street in the bottom of the map

The neighbourhood escaped both the fire of 1728 and 1795, and was also left largely unharmed by the British bombardment of the city during the Battle of Copenhagen in 1807. While Adelgade escaped the direct effects fires and war, they would still have a deep impact on the street. Many people who had been left homeless and ruined by the disasters moved there in search of affordable accommodation, making it increasingly crowded. Gardens and courtyards were built over and extra floors were added on top of existing buildings to make room for the many new residents.

On 26 January 1865, the first public bath house opened in the street after a donation from Carl Joachim Hambro, a banker residing in London, but apart from that sanitation facilities were sparse.

When the Fortifications were decommissioned in the middle of the century, many of the owners moved on to the new residential districts which had sprung up, such as Nørrebro and Vesterbro, and the area around Borgergade developed into one of the worst and most crowded slums in the city with a notorious reputation for poverty, vice and crime.

In the end, it was decided to condemn the area. Clearing began in the early 1940s but was put on hold in 1943 due to the war. After the Liberation, the work was resumed and the area was built up with modern buildings in the late 1940s and 50s. Two smaller streets, Prinsessegade and Helsingørgade, ceased to exist.

== Notable buildings and residents ==
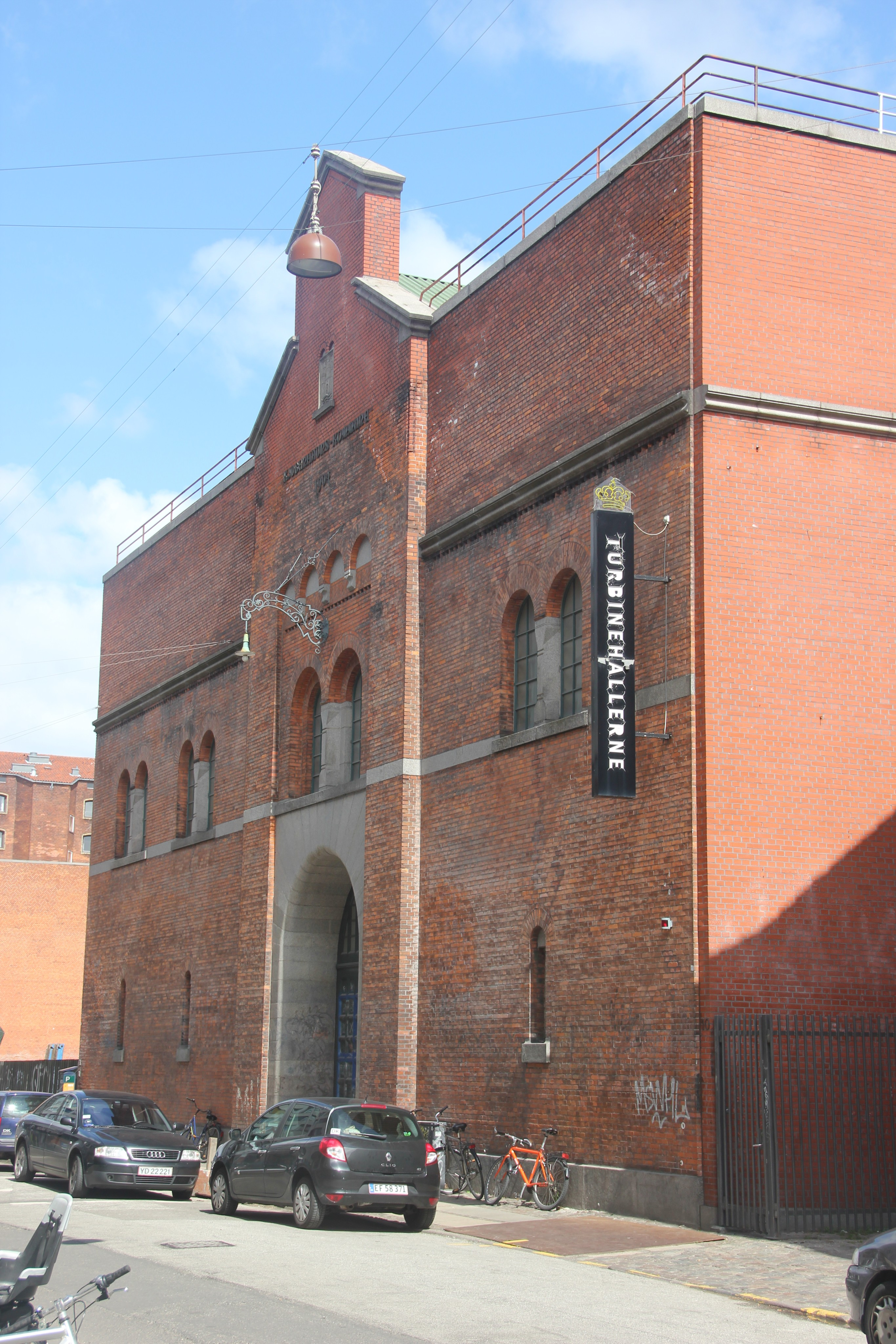
Turbinehallerne

Turbinehallen (No. 10) is the only surviving part of Gothersgade Power Plant. The building is from 1900 and was designed by Fritz Koch. It was adapted for use as a modern stage for the Royal Danish Theatre by Erik Møller Arkitekter in 1989 and was used as such until the inauguration of the Royal Danish Playhouse on the harbourfront. It is now used as a conference and event venue.

The 600-bed Generator Hostel Copenhagen (No. 5–7), on the other side of the street, opened in a former 1960s office building in 2011. It features a 700 square metre roof terrace.

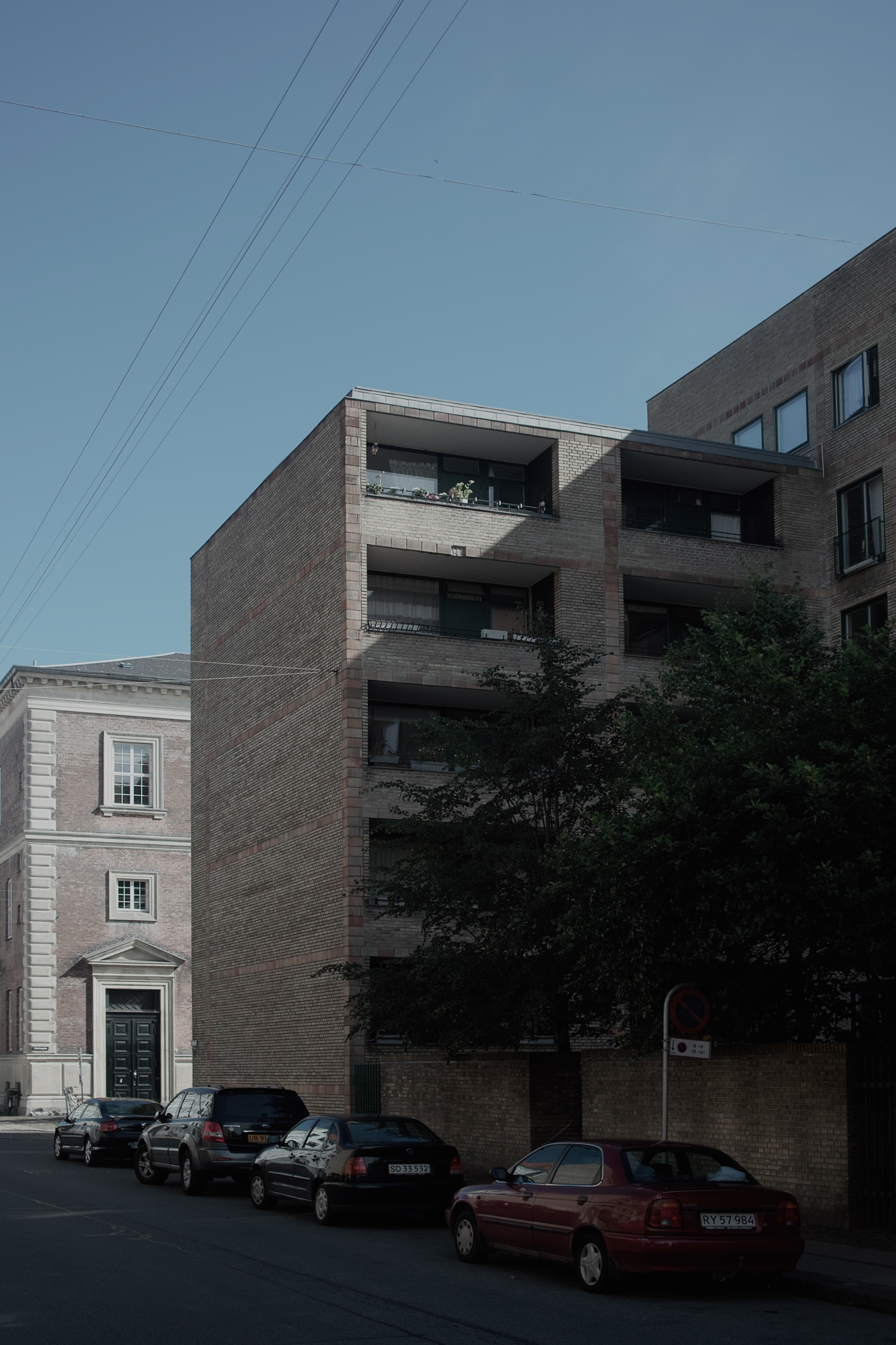
Borgergården

The most striking modern development along the street is Dronningegården which forms an urban space around the intersection of Adelgade with Dronningens Tværgade. The housing estate was designed by Kay Fisker.

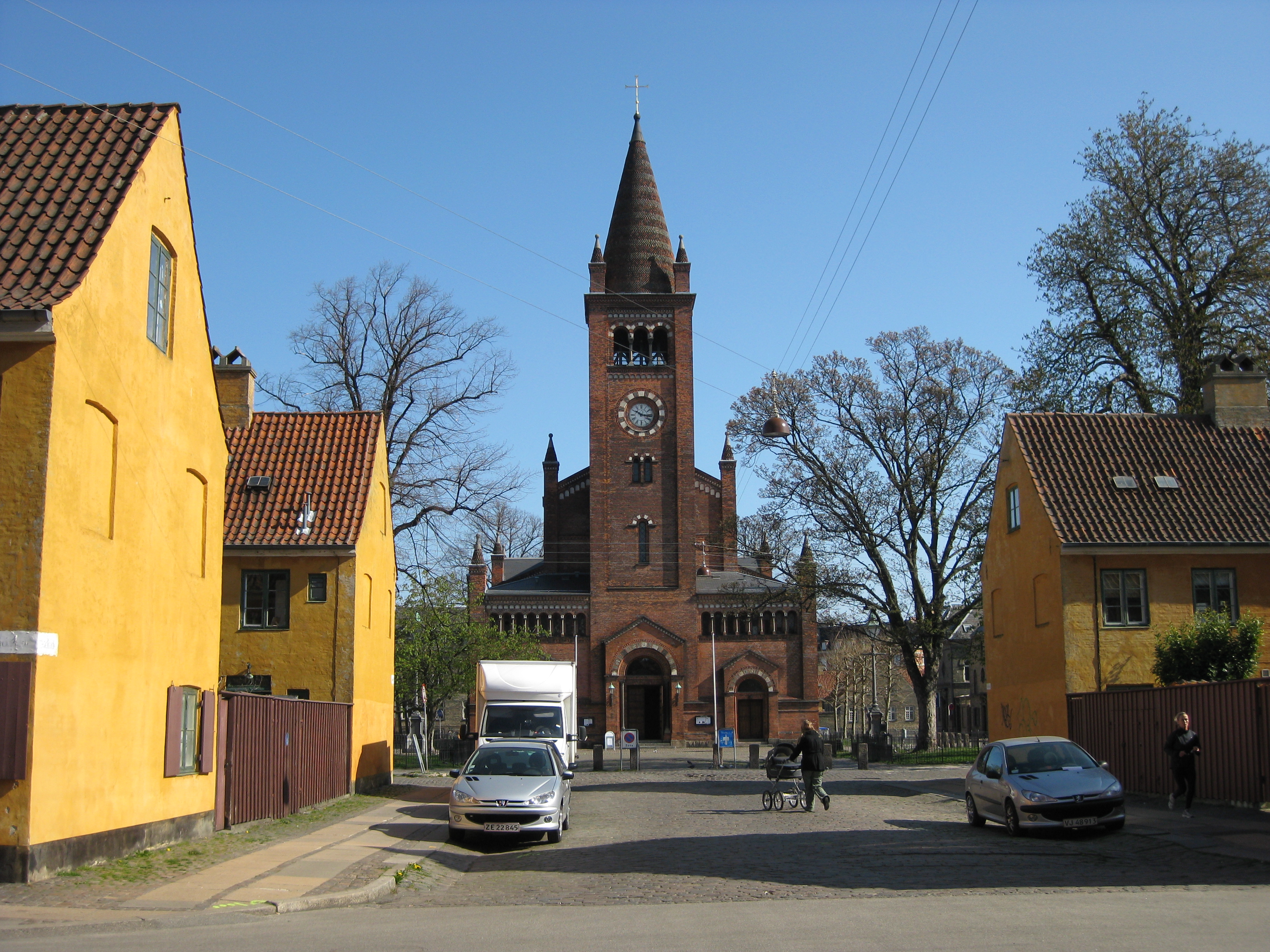
The far end of Adelgade with St Paul's Church and Nyboder houses

Borgergården (No. 50–64) is from 1960 and was designed by Thorvald Dreyer an Svend Eske Kristensen.d

The last section of Adelgade passes four rows of Nyboder houses, two on each side of the street, oriented along Fredericiagade and Olfert Fischer Gade respectively.

== See also ==
- Klerkegade
- Ny Adelgade
