= Kokkeriet =

Coordinates: 55.6876°N 12.5851°E

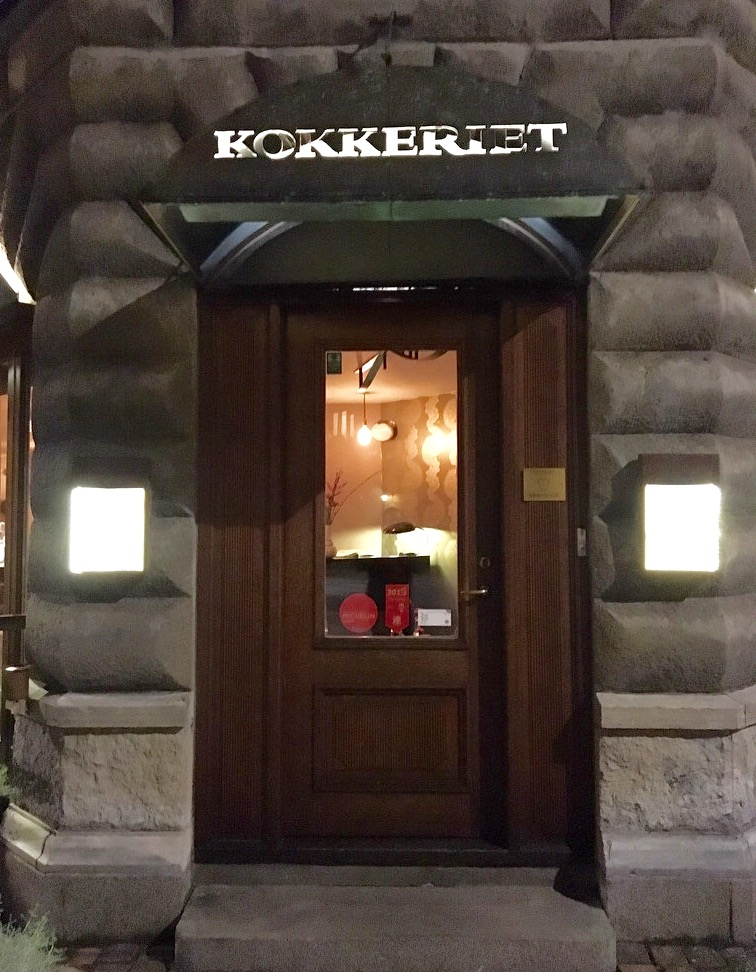
- Entrance
- Interactive map of Kokkeriet

Restaurant information
- Location: Copenhagen, Denmark

Restaurant Kokkeriet was a Danish restaurant located on Kronprinsessegade in central Copenhagen. The kitchen was managed by chef David Johansen. Kokkeriet was owned by Sammy and Mikkel Shafi and was a family-run business managed on a daily basis by Sammy.
