= Kronprinsessegade =

Street in Copenhagen, Denmark

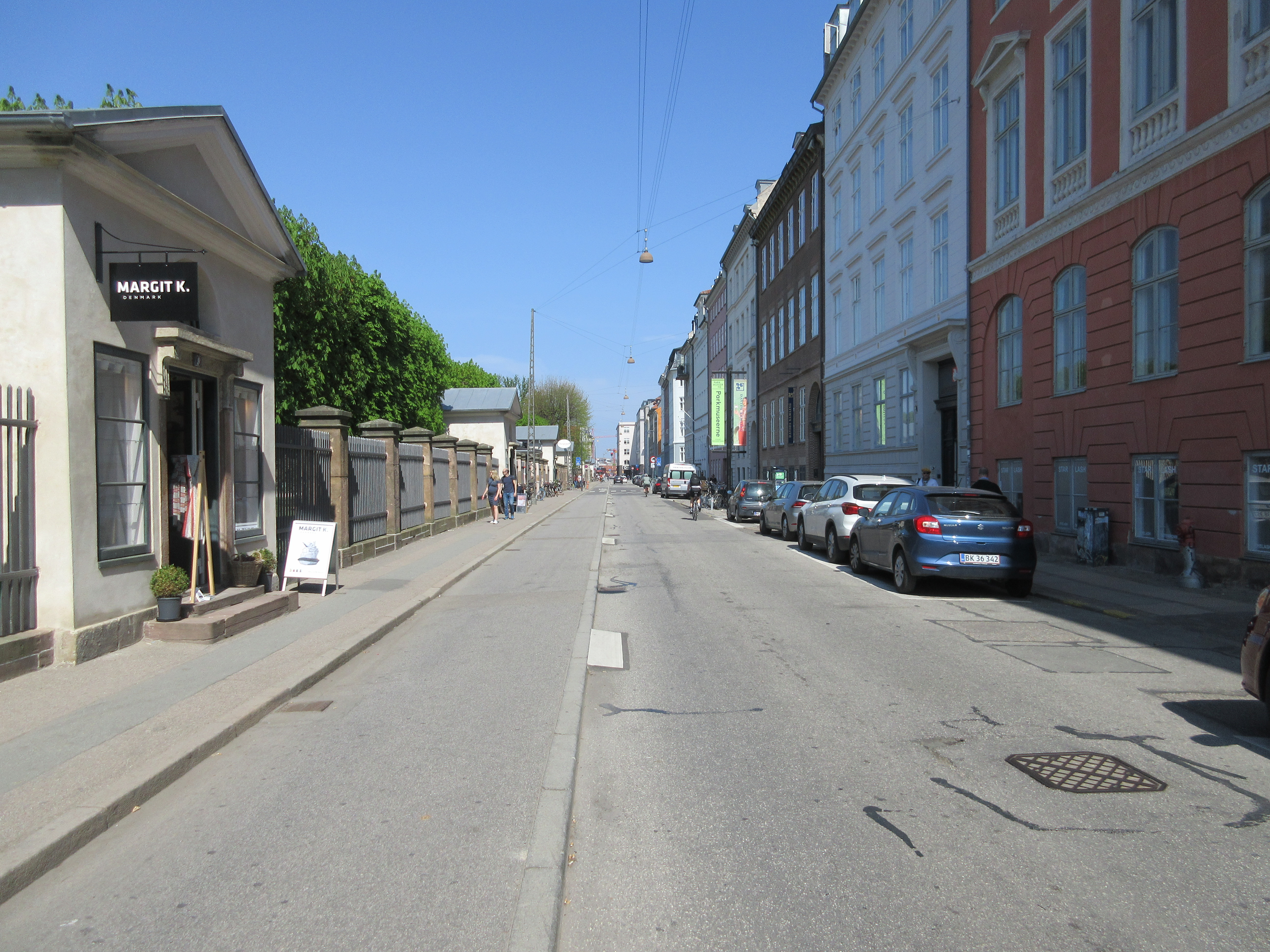
- Interactive map of Kronprinsessegade
- Length: 965 m (3,166 ft)
- Location: Indre By, Copenhagen, Denmark
- Postal code: 1306
- Nearest metro station: Nørreport
- Coordinates: 55°41′11″N 12°35′2″E

Kronprinsessegade (Danish pronunciation: [ˈkʰʁoːnpʰʁenˌsesəˌkɛːðə]; lit. 'Crown Princess Street') is a street in central Copenhagen, Denmark. Noted for its Neoclassical houses, it extends from Gothersgade and runs along the southern boundary of Rosenborg Castle Garden, passing Sølvgade and the Nyboder district of old naval barracks before finally joining Øster Voldgade close to Østerport Station. The David Collection, a museum which displays a large collection of Islamic art as well as Danish and European fine and applied arts, is based at No. 30.

== History ==
=== Origins ===
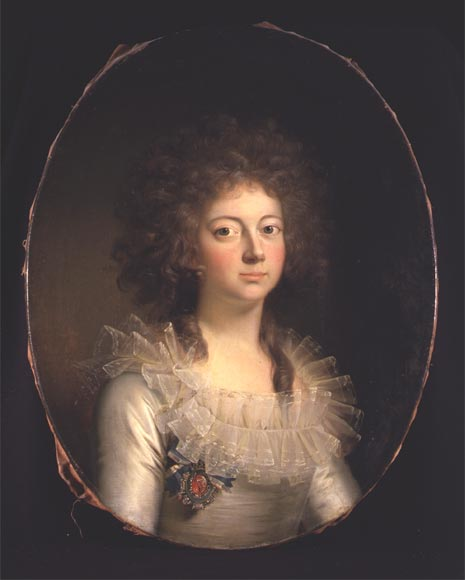
Marie Sophie of Hesse-Kassel painted by Jens Juel in 1910

After the Copenhagen Fire of 1795, which destroyed large parts of the city, there was an urgent need for new housing. Instigated by his consort, Crown Princess Marie Sophie, Crown Prince Frederik (VI) made an 89 ell (55.8 meter) strip along the southern boundary of Rosenborg Castle Garden available for the establishment of a new street which was to connect Gothersgade to Sølvgade.

The new street was named Kronprinsessegade in honour of Crown Princess Marie Sophie, who had first conceived the idea. At the same time, the name complied with the practice in the area of naming streets after Danish territorial possessions, royalty and the upper classes, including nobility, which originated in the 1649 plan for the New Copenhagen extension of the fortified city.

City architect Peter Meyn (1749–1808) and Jørgen Henrich Rawert (1751–1823) were put in charge of the project which began in 1799. The row of houses along the south side of the street was completed over the next two decades. The architect Johan Martin Quist is one of the large contributors to this oldest section of Kronprinsessegade with No. 6 (1803–06), 8-10 (1803–04), 12-14 (1805–06), 16 (1806–07) and 18 (1807–13). Andreas Hallander designed No. 20 (1805–06, with J. H. Rawert), 22, 24 (1807–08, with A. C. Wilcken) and Kronprinsessegades Barracks at No. 46 (extension 1805–07, with J. H. Rawert).

=== Wrought-iron grill and pavilions ===
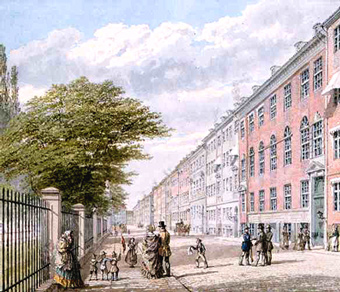
Kronprinsessegade painted by H. G. F. Holm in c. 1845

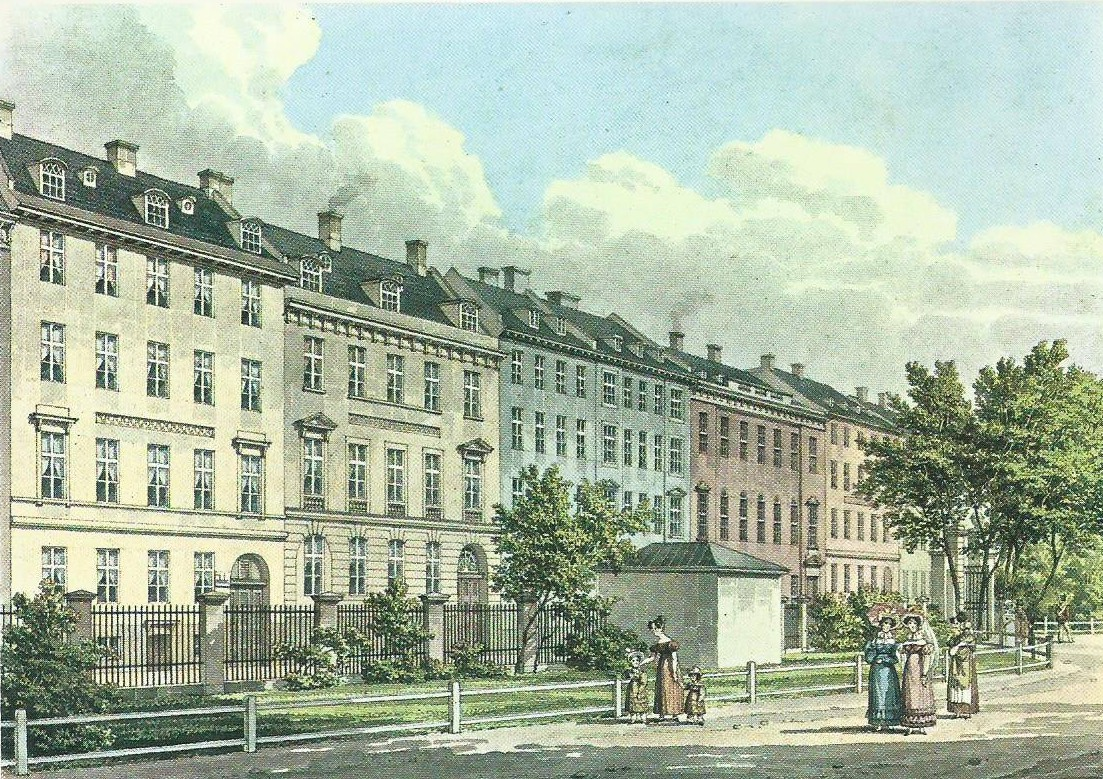
Kronprinsessegade seen from Rosenborg Castle Garden. Painting by H. G. F. Holm, c. 1830

Peter Meyn was also charged with the design of a barrier towards the royal garden along the north side of the new street. He had just returned from Paris where he had been struck by the Pont-Neuf with its iron grill and many small shops, and the street life which surrounded it. With this as an inspiration, he designed the new grill along the edge of the park with 12 small shop pavilions, each six ells wide, six ells deep and six ells tall. It was completed in 1806.

== Architecture ==
The houses along the oldest section of the street, facing Rosenborg Castle Garden, are mostly built in a Neoclassical style typical of the construction boom during the decades after the Great Fire of 1795 and which still dominates in much of central Copenhagen. The architect, architectural writer and urban planner Steen Eiler Rasmussen has given the following characterisation of the street:

"...Together with P. Meyn, he [J.H. Rawert] is renowned for one of the finest street scenes in Copenhagen: Kronprinsessegade, a street which, like the Amalienborg neighbourhood, has been carefully planned, both in terms of width ond height. Here the Copenhagen traditions of Eigtved's town house architecture live on, creating an atmosphere akin to that of a London square."

== Commemorative plaques ==
A plaque on No. 36 commemorates that the composer Christoph Ernst Friedrich Weyse lived in the building from 1825.

== See also ==
- Adelgade
- Borgergade
- Kronprinsensgade
- Kronprinsessegade 8
