= Borgergade =

Street in Copenhagen, Denmark

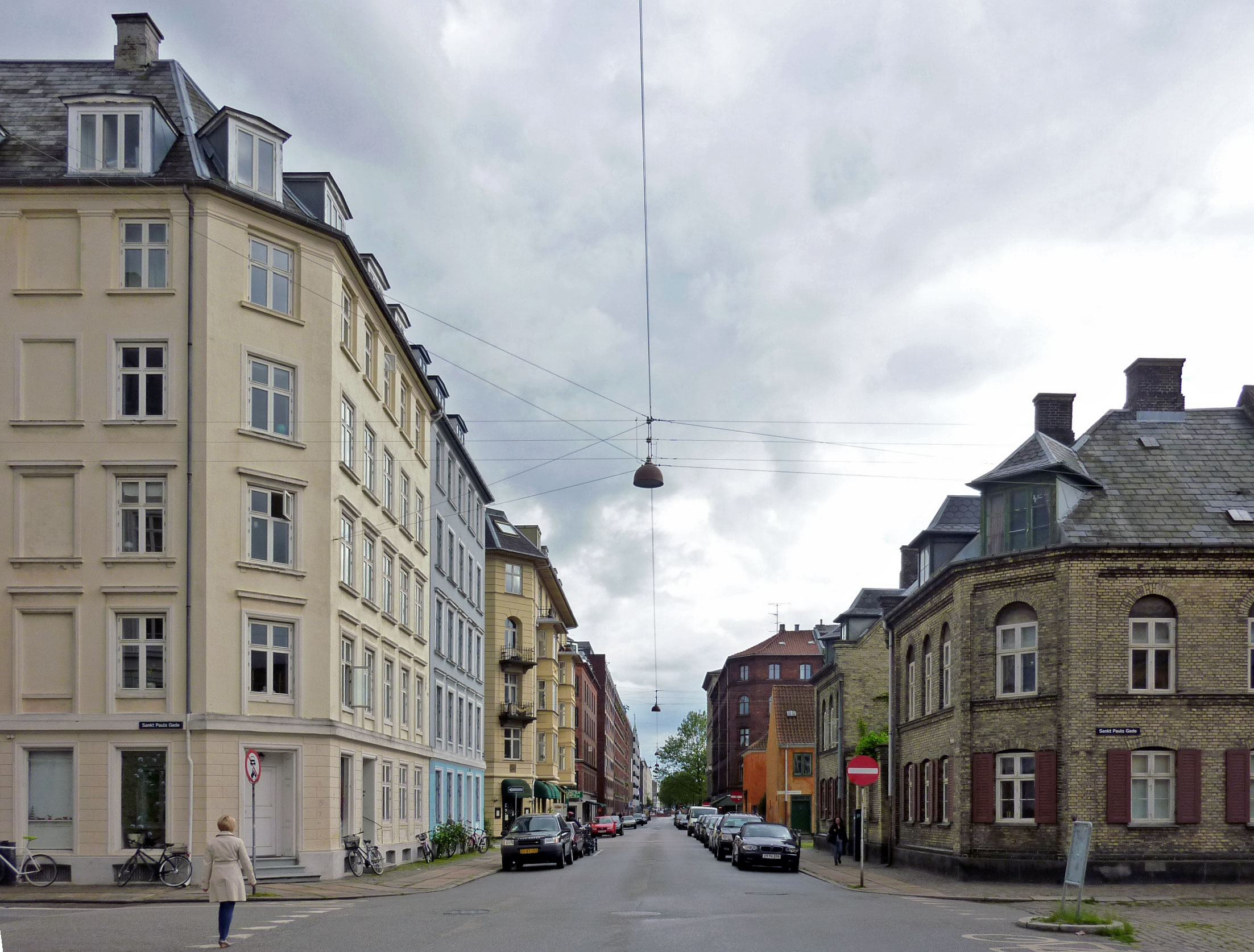
- Borgergade with one of the Grey Rows of the Nyboder district seen on the right
- Length: 850 m (2,790 ft)
- Location: Copenhagen, Denmark
- Quarter: Indre By
- Nearest metro station: Kongens Nytorv, Østerport
- Coordinates: 55°41′2.69″N 12°35′7.42″E
- Southwest end: Gothersgade
- Northeast end: Store Kongensgade

Borgergade is a street in central Copenhagen, Denmark. It runs from Gothersgade to Store Kongensgade. As one of relatively few streets in central Copenhagen, the street, in its western part, is dominated by modern buildings. The eastern part passes through the Nyboder district.

== History ==
=== Foundation of the street ===
Borgergade originates in the 1649 plan for New Copenhagen, the large area which was included in the fortified city when the old East Rampart along present day Gothersgade was decommissioned and a new one was built in a more northerly direction. According to the plan, the streets in the area were to be named after Danish territorial possessions, royalty and the upper classes. The new district was spaciously planned with long straight streets. The most affluent families settled along Bredgade and Ny Kongensgade while the area around Borgergade and Adelgade catered to a more modest clientele, typically craftsmen and shop-keepers. The buildings were generally half-timbered and relatively small, and living conditions were still considerably better than in the crowded city centre.

=== Escaping disaster ===
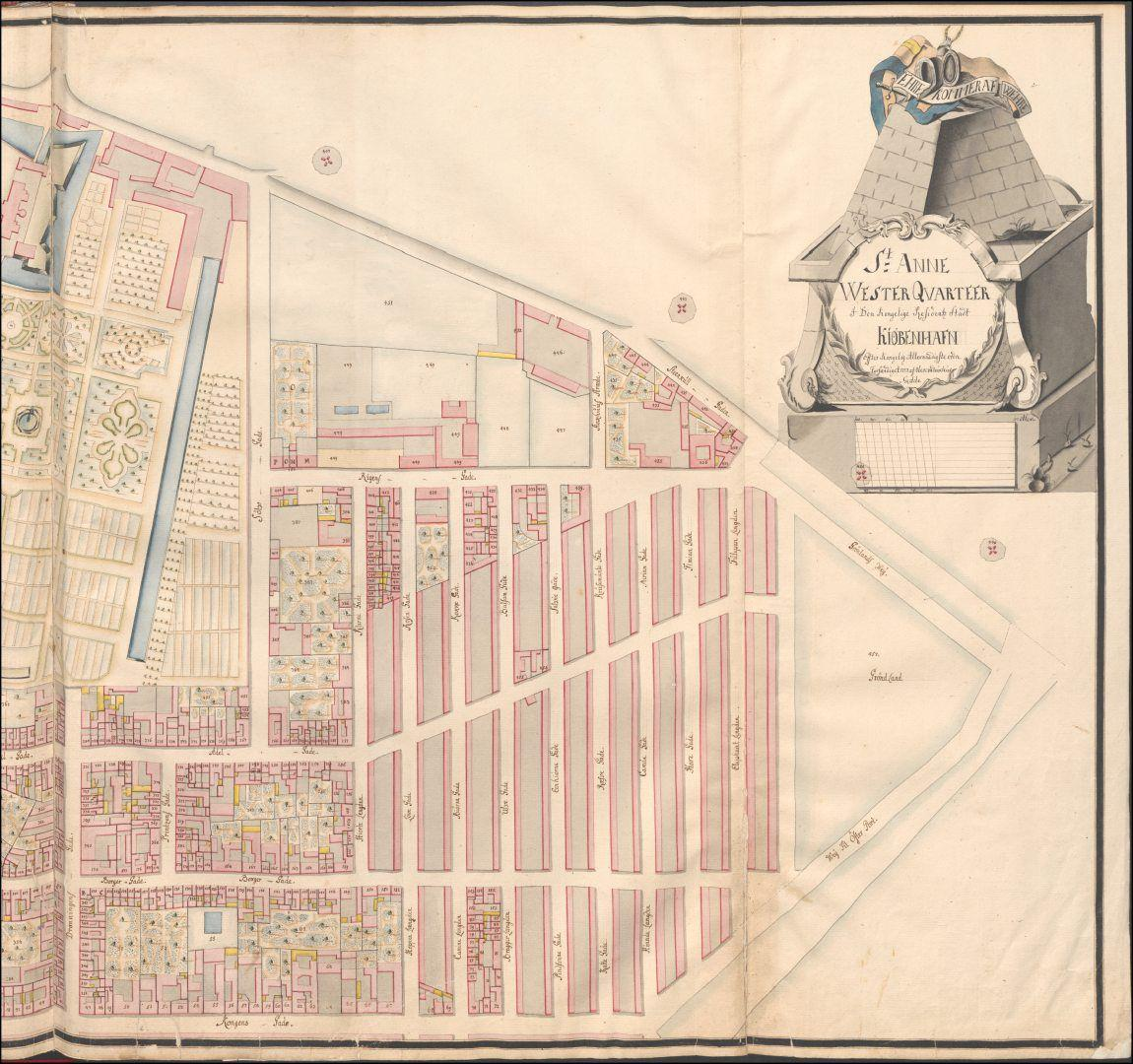
Christian Gedde's 1757 map of St. Ann's West Quarter: Borgergade is the horizontal street in the bottom of the map

The neighbourhood escaped both the Great Fires of 1728 and 1795, and was also left largely unharmed by the British bombardment of the city during the Battle of Copenhagen in 1807.

One of the finest buildings in the street was the Mint Master's House. It had been built in 1683 by Royal Mint Master Gregorius Sessemann as his private residence and was inhabited by successive mint masters until 1752. In 1720 the house was fitted with a fine Baroque staircase. A separate apartment was created which was rented by the Russian Ambassador in 1728. In the 1760s the house was extended and adapted once again, reaching its finest state. In 1767, it was acquired by a master mason who lived there until 1803.

=== Crowding and poverty ===
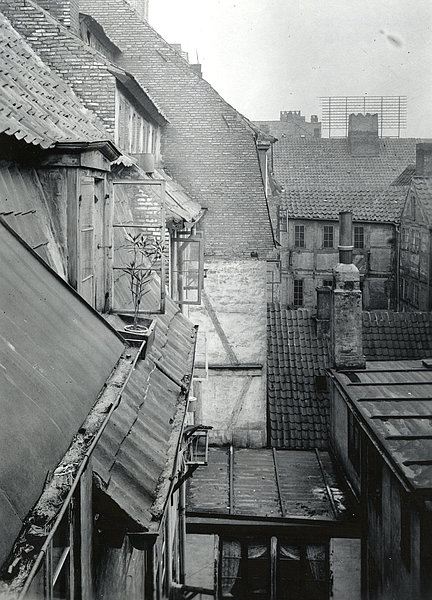
Slum

While Borgergade escaped the direct effects fires and war, they would still have a deep impact on the street. Many people who had been left homeless and ruined by the disasters moved there in search of affordable accommodation, making it increasingly crowded. Gardens and courtyards were built over and extra floors were added on top of existing buildings to make room for the many new residents.

On 26 January 1865, the first public bath house opened in the street after a donation from Carl Joachim Hambro, a banker residing in London, but apart from that sanitation facilities were sparse.

When the Fortifications were decommissioned in the middle of the century, many of the owners moved on to the new residential districts which had sprung up, such as Nørrebro and Vesterbro, and the area around Borgergade developed into one of the worst and most crowded slums in the city with a notorious reputation for poverty, vice and crime.

=== Condemnation ===
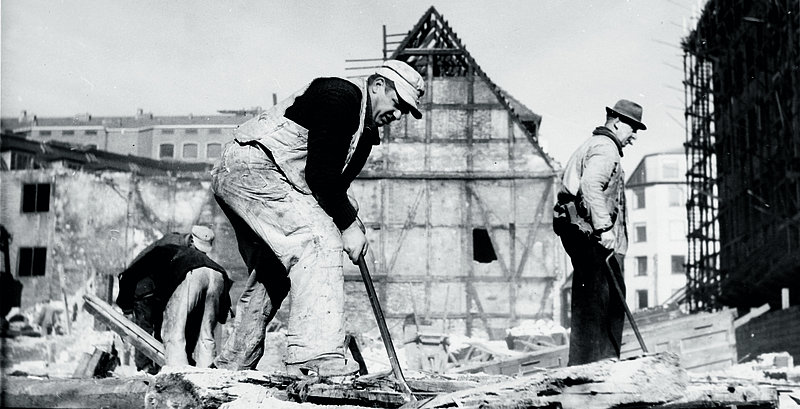
Demolition work with the Mint Master's House as a backdrop

In the end, it was decided to condemn the area. Clearing began in the early 1940s but was put on hold in 1943 due to the war. After the Liberation, the work was resumed and the area was built up with modern buildings in the late 1940s and 50s. Two smaller streets, Prinsessegade and Helsingørgade, ceased to exist.

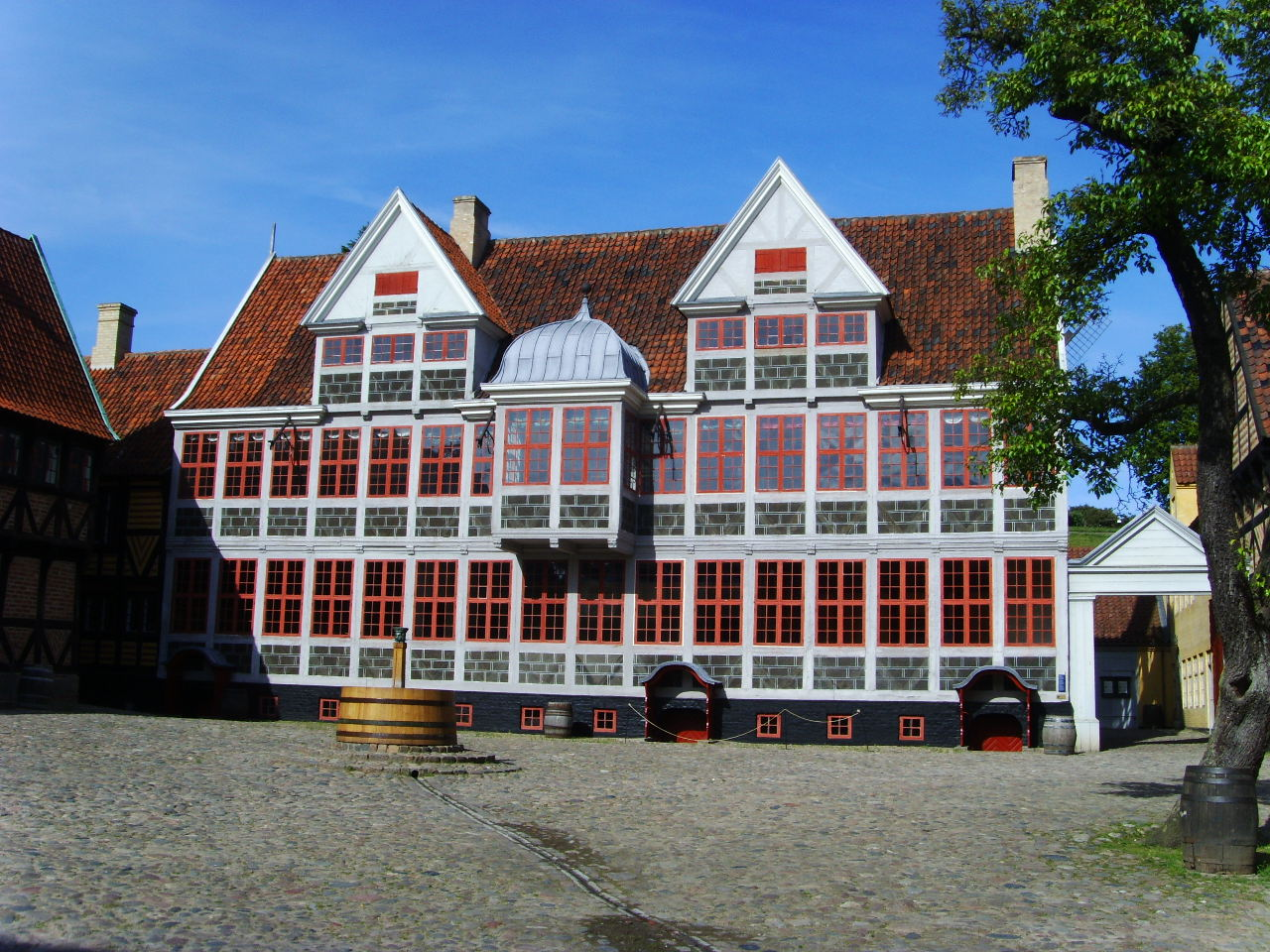
The Mint Master's House in Aarhus

Instigated by Christian Axel Jensen, director of Museum of Copenhagen, the Mint Master's House was dismantled, registered and stored in a shed at Vestre Cemetery. The plan was to re-build it at a later date as part of an open-air museum dedicated to urban architecture which was to complement the rural buildings at Lyngby Open Air Museum but it never materialised. In 1995, The Old Town in Aarhus took over the materials and the house was finally reconstructed in 2009.

== Buildings ==
As a result of the condemnations, the first, western, section of the street is lined with modern buildings. At Dronningens Tværgade, the street passes the south side of Dronningegården, a distinctive residential complex which forms a space round the intersection of Dronningens Tværgade and Adelgade.

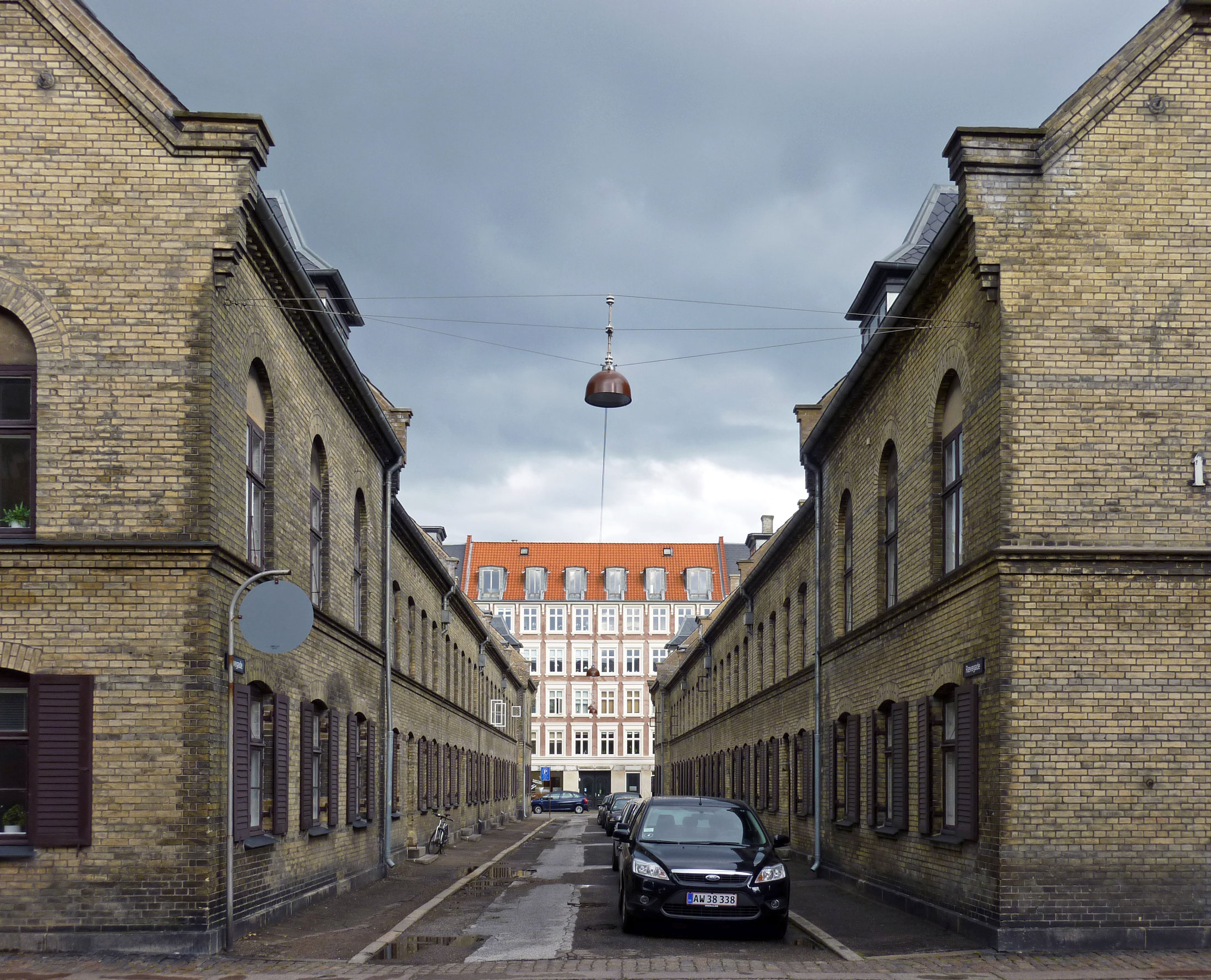
A peek of Borgergade between two of the Grey Rows along Rævegade

The modern buildings finally give way to older buildings and the last section of the street from Fredericiagade passes through the Nyboder district, an area of naval barracks founded by King Christian IV. Both the more famous yellow houses and the younger so-called Grey (or New) Rows, designed by Olaf Schmidth and built between 1886 and 1893, are to be found along the street. The Historicist building at No. 111 was built as a girls' school and later served as a naval cadet academy. It is now known as Bygningskulturens Hus and serve as a centre for historical architecture and cultural heritage.

== Cultural references ==
Borgergade at No. 28 is used as a location at 0:25:27 and again at 0:28:43 in the 1975 Olsen-banden film The Olsen Gang on the Track.

== See also ==
- Kronprinsessegade
- Toldbodgade
