= Rosenborg Castle Gardens =

Park in Copenhagen, Denmark

Kongens Have
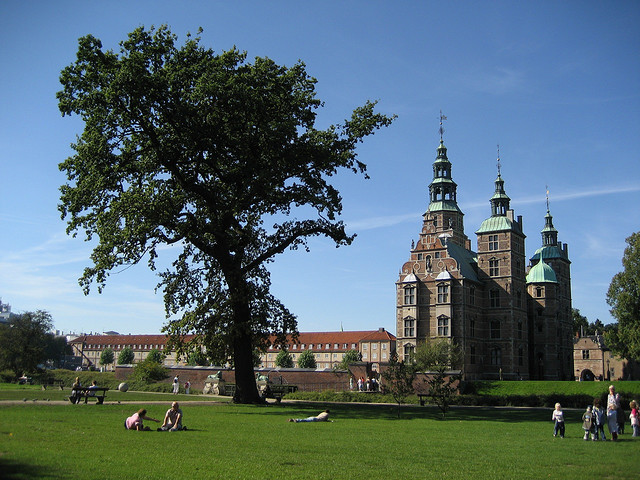
- A view of Rosenborg Castle from Kongens Have
- Interactive map of Kongens Have
- Type: Urban park
- Location: Copenhagen, Denmark
- Coordinates: 55°41′06″N 12°34′44″E
- Area: 12 hectares (30 acres)
- Created: 1606
- Visitors: 2.5 million
- Status: Open all year

Rosenborg Castle Gardens (Danish: Kongens Have; literally The King's Garden) is the oldest and most visited park in central Copenhagen, Denmark. Established in the early 17th century as the private gardens of King Christian IV's Rosenborg Castle, the park also contains several other historical buildings, including Rosenborg Barracks, home to the Royal Guards, as well as a high number of statues and monuments. The park also holds art exhibitions and other events such as concerts in the summer.

== History ==
=== The Renaissance gardens ===
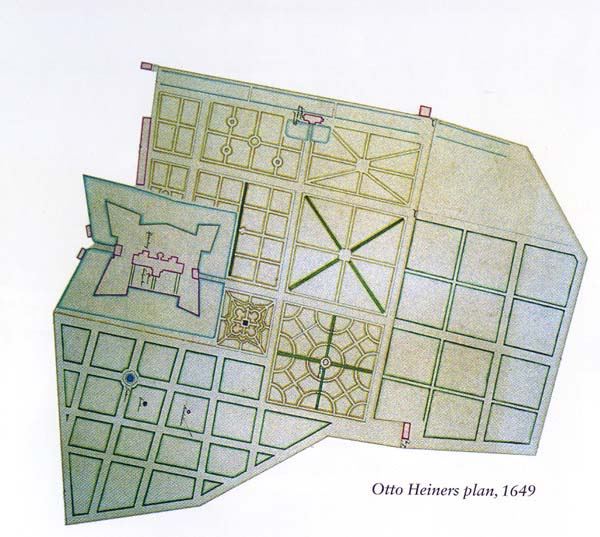
Otto Heider's plan from 1649

The park traces its history back to 1606 when King Christian IV acquired land outside Copenhagen's East Rampart and established a pleasure garden in Renaissance style which also delivered fruit, vegetables and flowers for the royal household at Copenhagen Castle. The garden had a relatively small pavilion which was later expanded into present day Rosenborg Castle which was completed in 1624. In 1634, Charles Ogier, secretary to the French ambassador to Denmark, compared the gardens to the Tuileries Garden in Paris. A drawing by Otto Heider from 1649, the oldest dated garden plan from Denmark, provides knowledge about the layout of the original garden. The garden contained a pavilion, statues, a fountain and various other features. Its plants included mulberries, wine, apples, pears, and lavender.

=== The Baroque gardens ===
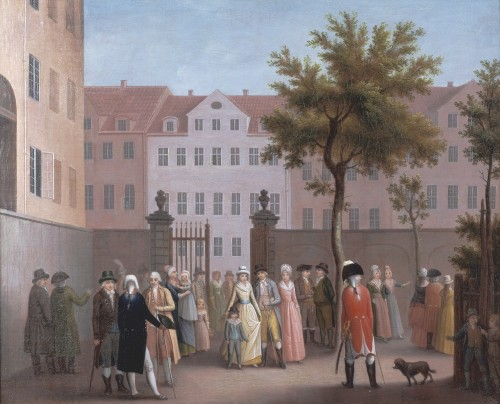
Entrance to Rosenborg Gardens in 1780

Later in the century, as fashions changed, the garden was redesigned. A garden plan from 1669 show a garden maze, a typical feature of the Baroque garden. It had an intricate system of paths which led to a central space with an octagonal summerhouse in its centre. From about 1710, after Frederiksberg Palace had been built, Rosenborg Castle, as well as its gardens, was largely abandoned by the royal family and the gardens were instead opened to the public.

Johan Cornelius Krieger was appointed gardener of the Orangery in 1711 and after becoming head gardener in 1721 he redesigned the garden in the Baroque style.

== Layout ==
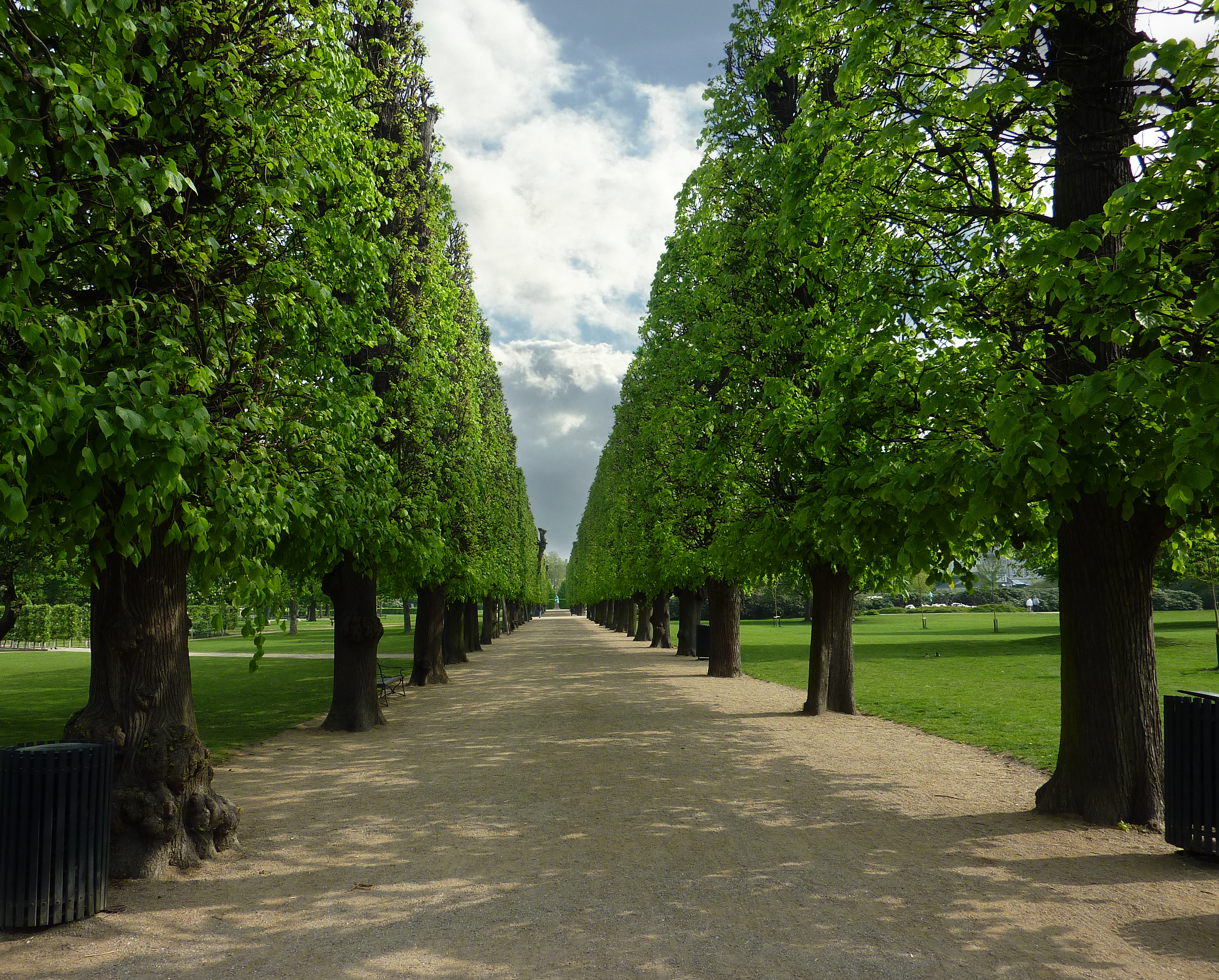
One of the avenues

The 12-hectare park is bounded by the streets Gothersgade, Øster Voldgade, Sølvgade and Kronprinsessegade. Rosenborg Castle is located in the north-western section of the park and is surrounded by a moat on three sides. The two main entrance are the King's Gate at the corner of Gothersgade and Kronprinsessegade, and the Queen's Gate at the corner of Øster Voldgade and Sølvgade. There are also four other entrances to the park.

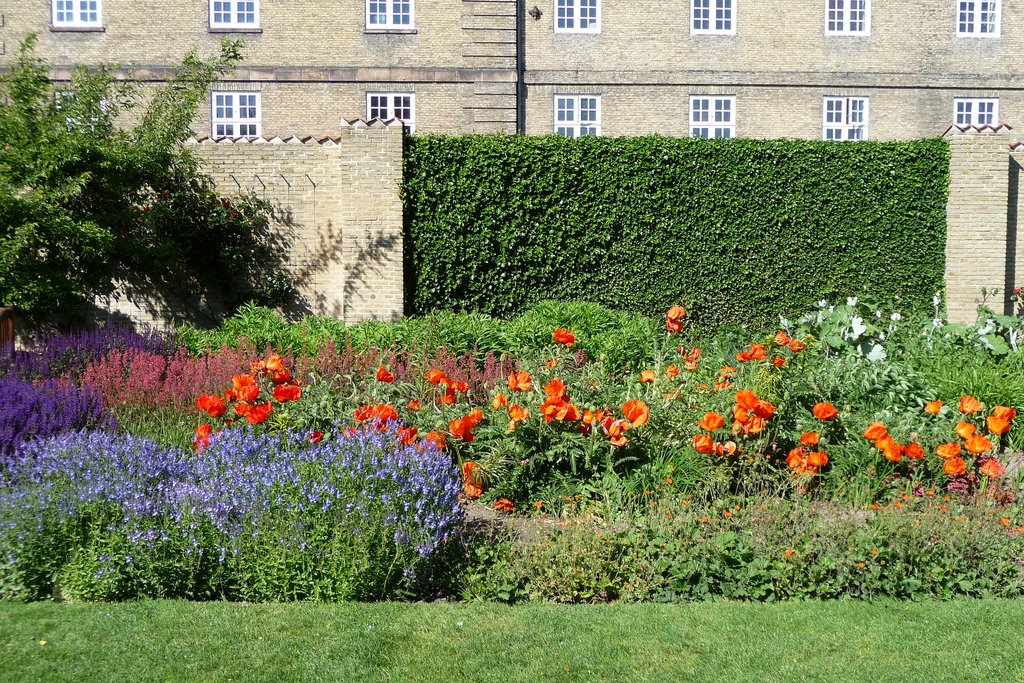
One of the avenues

A dominant feature of the scenery are the two diagonal lime tree avenues which intersect near the centre of the park and are known as the Knight's Path (Danish: Kavalergangen) and the Lady's Path (Danish: Damegangen), while the rest of the paths are laid out in a grid pattern. The tree-lined avenues were planted as part of Krieger's Baroque garden but the underlying network of paths can be seen in Heiders' plan from 1649.

Special sections include the PerennialsGarden in front of the wall along Sølvgade and the Rose Garden.

== Buildings ==
=== Rosenborg Barracks ===
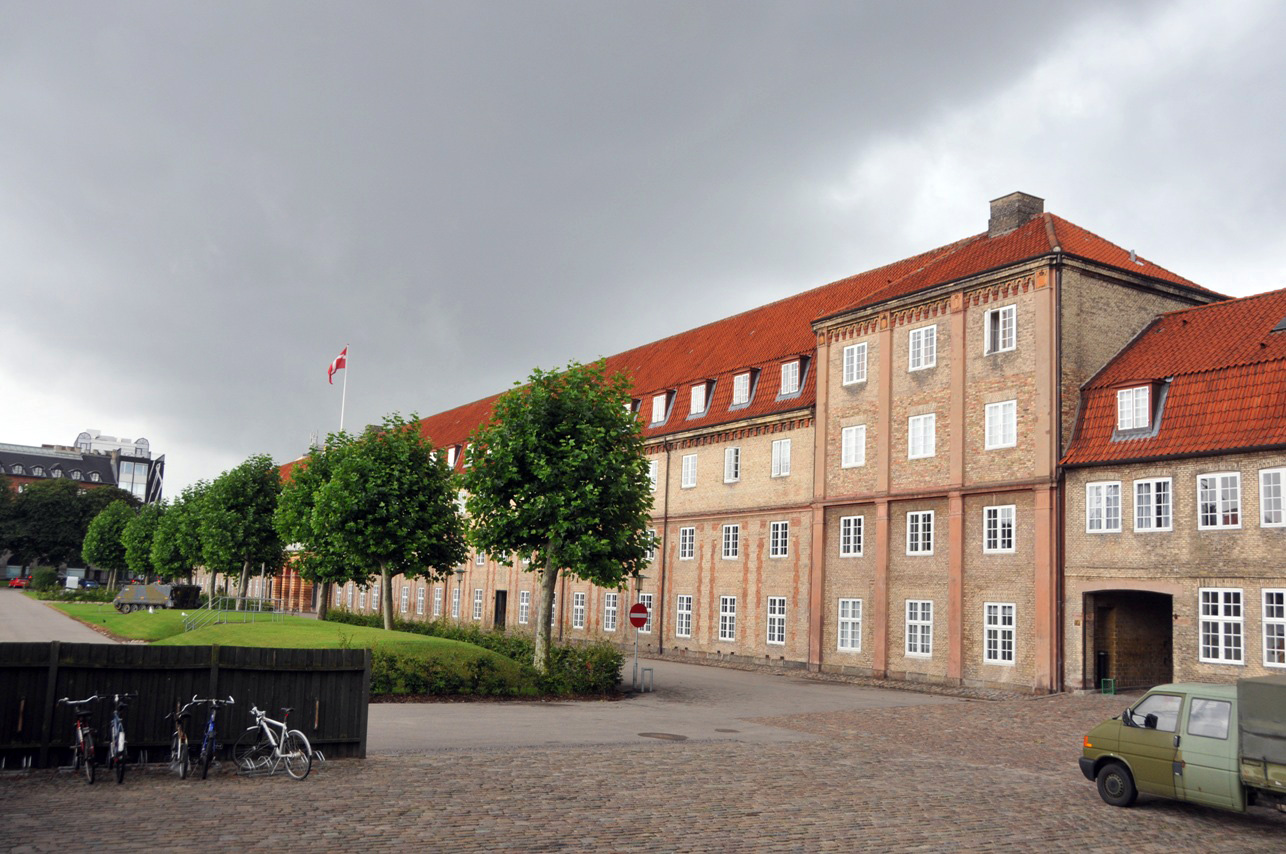
Rosenborg Barracks

Rosenborg Barracks is located on the corner of Gothersgade and Øster Voldgade and was originally a pavilion and two long conservatory buildings built by Lambert van Haven for Christian V. In 1709 they were built together to form one large orangery complex and in 1743 it was redesigned into the Baroque style by Johan Cornelius Krieger. From 1885 to 1886 it was converted for use by the Royal Life Guard by Engineer Officer Ernst Peymann. In 1985 they moved to new premises at Høvelte between Allerød and Birkerød and since Rosenborg Barracks has only housed guards on duty at Copenhagen.

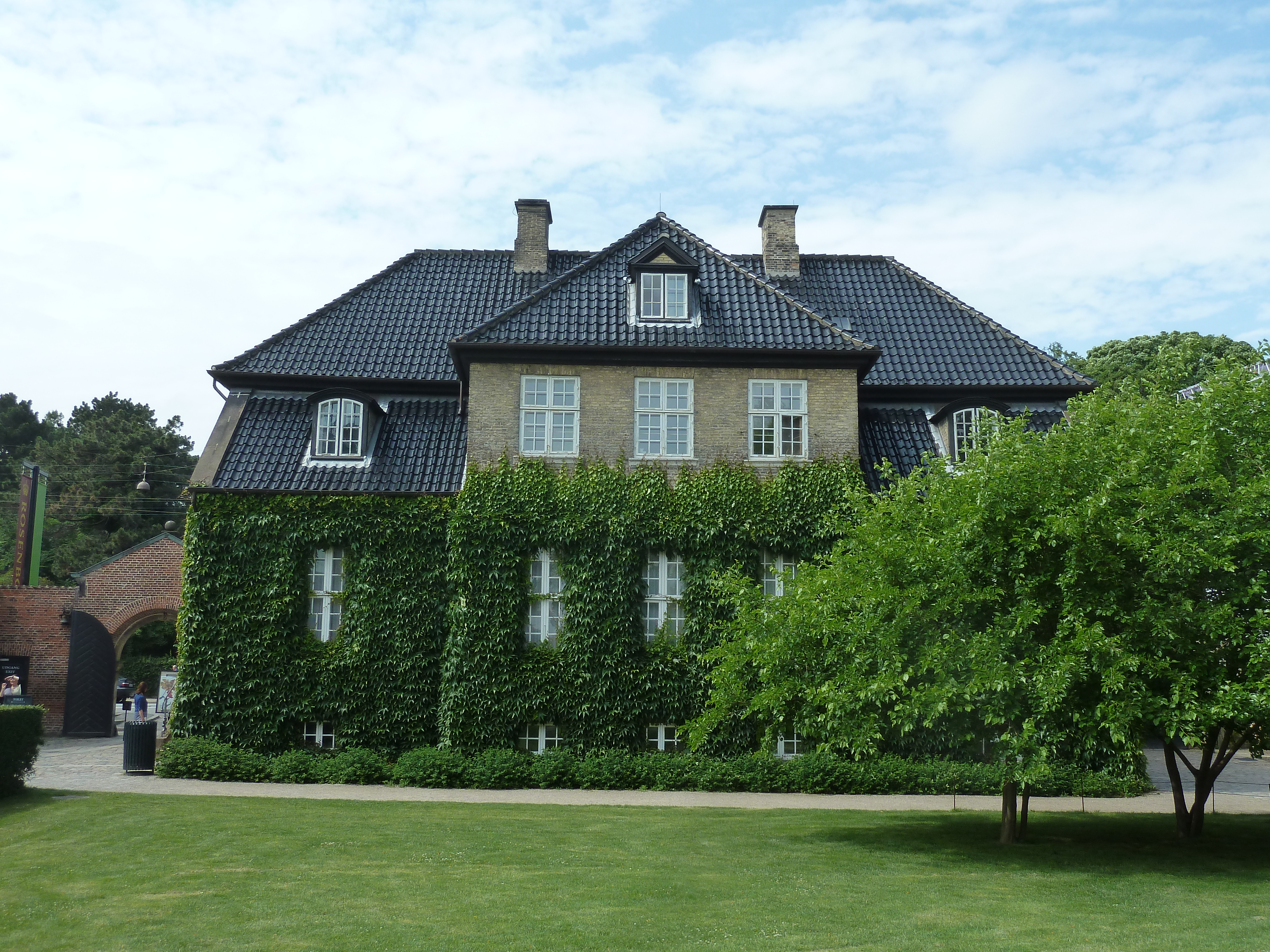
The Commandant's House at Rosenborg Castle Garden (1763)

=== Commandant's House ===
The Commandant's House is located just left of the main entrance to Rosenborg Castle and faces a lawn. It was built from 1760 to 1763 to designs by Jacob Fortling. The building is today used as an exhibition space.

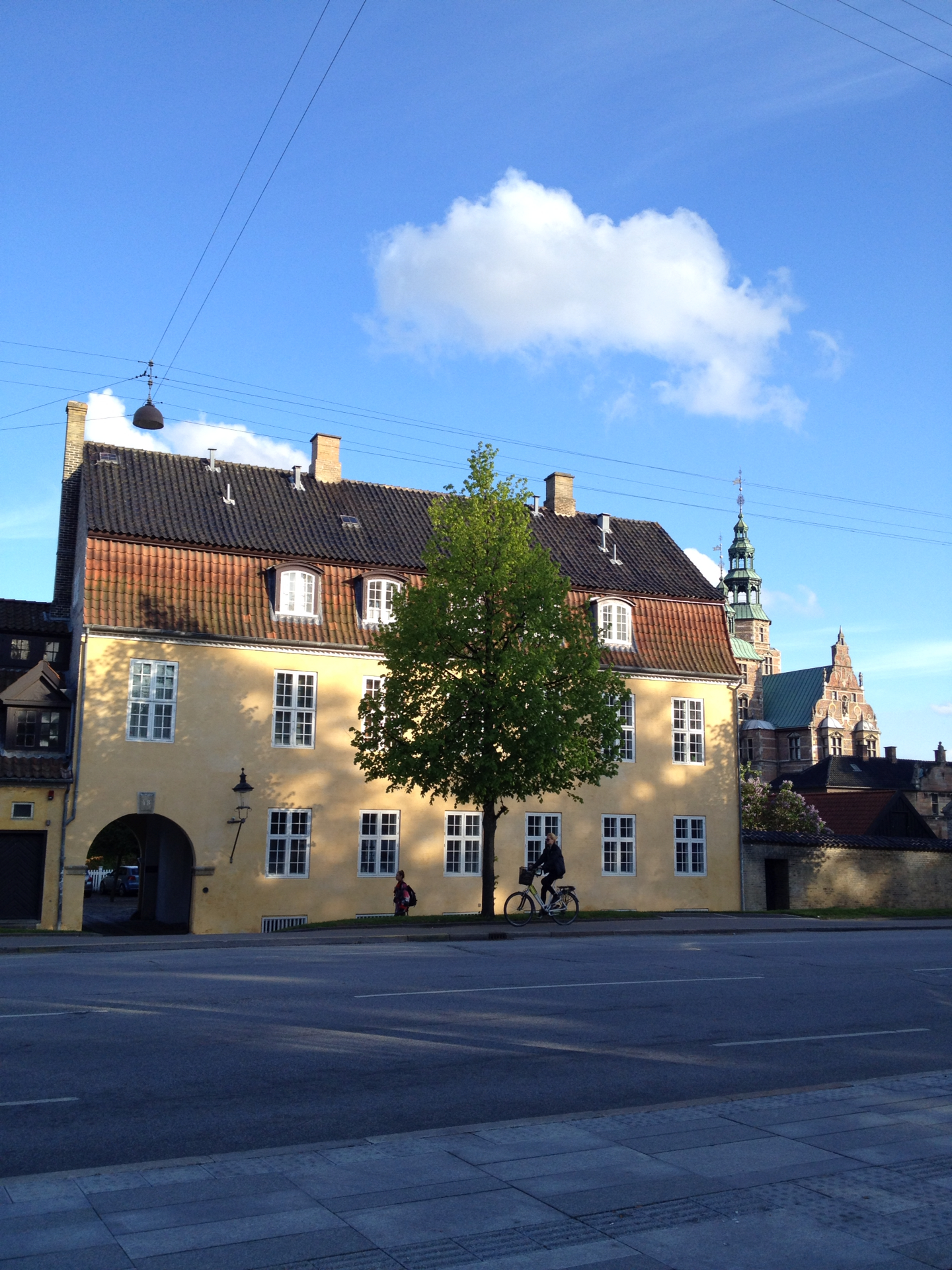
Slotsforvalterboligen

=== Slotsforvalterboligen ===
Slotsforvalterboligen fronts Øster Voldgade. It was built in 1688 and extended with an extra story in 1777. The gateway affords access to the park.

The Gartner's House is attached to Slotsforvalterboligen. It was built around the same time

=== Hercules Pavilion ===
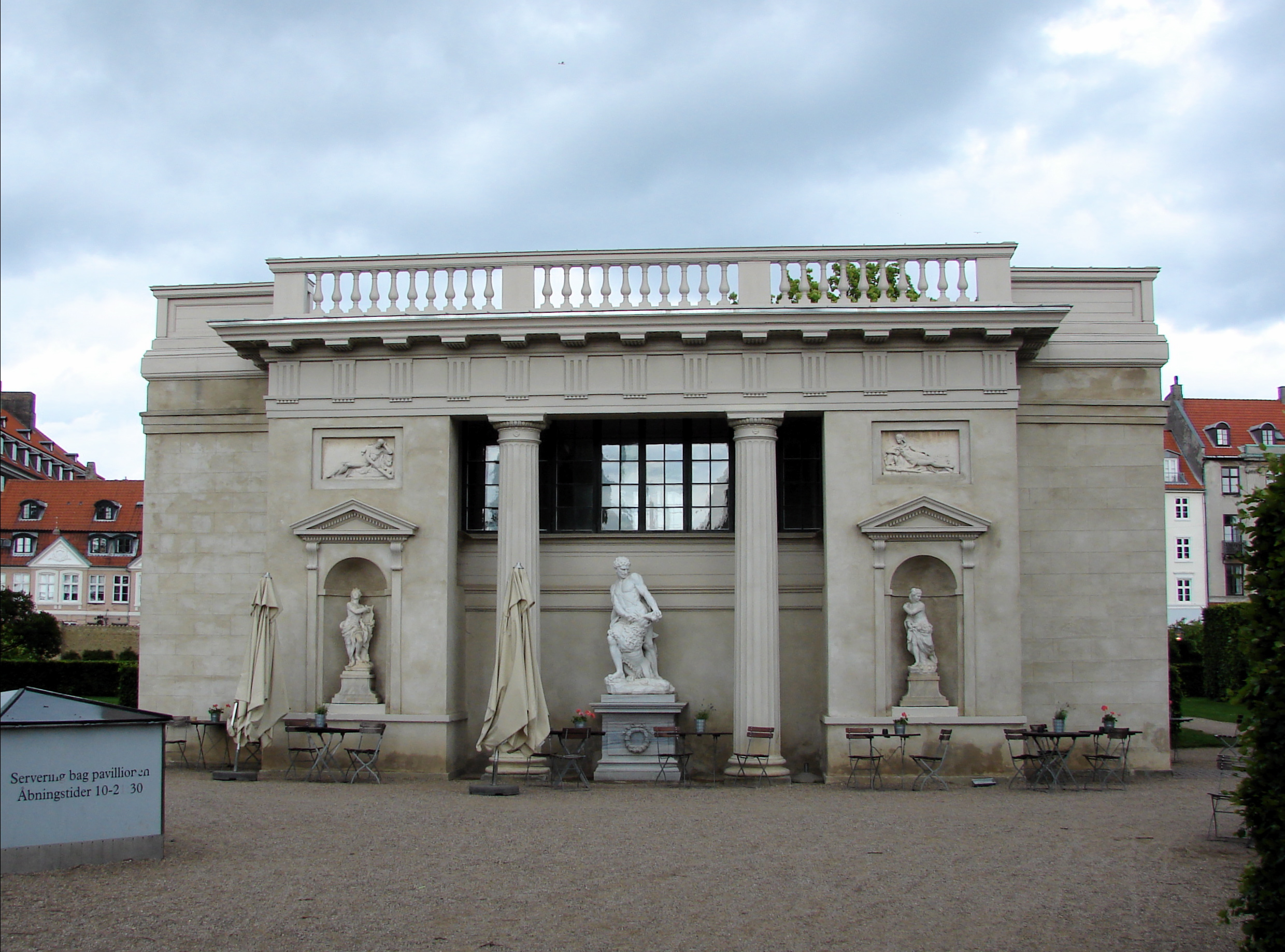
The Hercules Pavilion

The Hercules Pavilion stands at the end of Kavalergangen and takes its name from a statue of Hercules positioned in a deep niche between two Tuscan columns. It is flanked by two smaller niches with statues of Orpheus and Eurydice. The three statues were made by the Italian sculptor Giovanni Baratta and acquired by Frederik IV during his visit to Italy.

=== Wrought-iron grill and pavilions ===
Along Kronprinsessegade and parts of Gothersgade, the park is enclosed by a wrought-iron grill incorporating 16 small pavilions, which opens to the street side.

After the Copenhagen Fire of 1795 there was an urgent need for new housing and Crown Prince Frederik put the southern strip of his garden at disposal for the construction of a new street which was to connect Gothersgade to Sølvgade. It was named Kronprinsessegade (en. Crown Princess Street) in honour of Crown Princess Marie Sophie. New residential buildings soon sprung up along the south side of the street but in the same time the need arose for a barrier toward the garden and City Architect Peter Meyn was charged with the commission. He had just returned from Paris where he had been struck by the Pont-Neuf with its iron grill and many small shops and the street life which surrounded it. With this as an inspiration, he designed the new grill along the edge of the park with 14 small shop pavilions which were completed in 1806. The two last pavilions, opposite Landemærket, were not built until 1920. Before this time, the site was occupied by two buildings, Exercerhus (en. The Drill House) and Rosenborg Brøndanstalt.

The pavilions are built to a Newclassical design and are six ells wide, six ells deep and six ells high.

Among the goods which were sold from the pavilions were cakes and stockings. Later they were available to architects and artists from the Roydal Arts Academy as a sort of grant. Today they are rented out by the Palaces and Properties Agency on two-years leases with possibility of extension. There is a required minimum opening time of 20 hours per week and the use need be relevant to the site's history and in the same time put it in a contemporary context.

== Public art ==
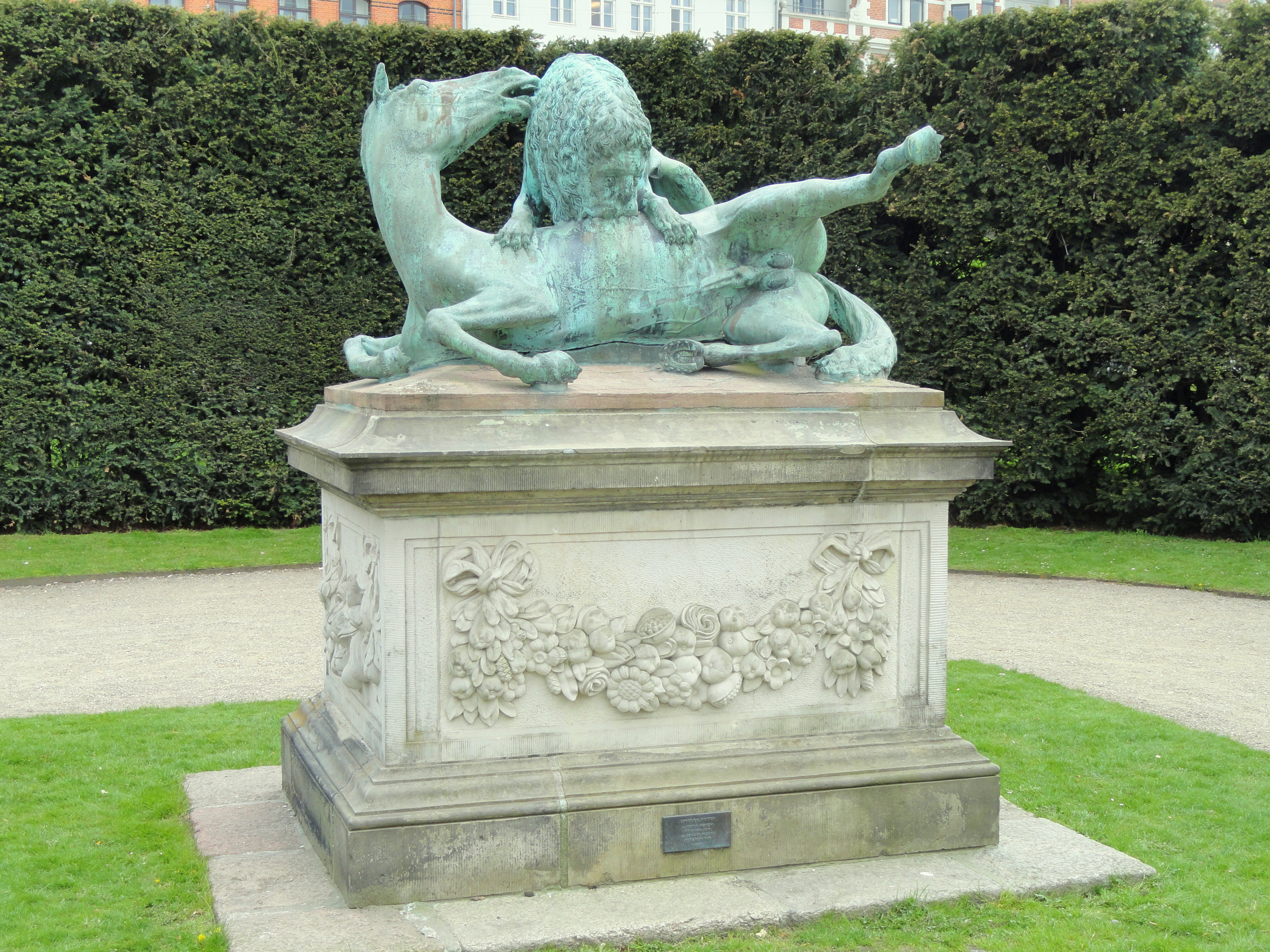
The Lion and the Horse

The oldest sculpture in the garden is The Horse and the Lion, commissioned by Christian IV from Peter Husum in 1617 and completed in 1625. A near copy of an antique marble sculpture at Capitoline Hill in Rome, it depicts a lion with a humanoid face which is tearing apart a horse which it has just brought down. The subject is associated with a Persian legend about the battle between light and darkness. The statue was probably placed in the garden after its completion but temporarily moved to Glückstadt in 1643 in connection with Prince Frederick (III)'s marriage to Sophie Amalie of Brunswick-Lüneburg in 1643, supposedly as an expression of the king's aggravation over his cousin George, Duke of Brunswick-Lüneburg's failure to assist him in the Battle of Lutter in 1626 with the lion representing the Coat of arms of Denmark and the horse that of the Duchy. The statue was moved back to the garden at Rosenborg Castle when Frederick III ascended the throne and is now located between the two ring riding columns in the southern section of the park.

The 17 marble balls surrounding the Matzen Lawn are believed to come from the never completed St. Ann's Rotunda, a monumental church which was under construction on a nearby site but never completed, and have been placed in the park since at least 1783.

The Boy on the Swan is a fountain consisting of a 148 cm tall bronze sculpture of a small boy riding on a swan which sprays water from its beak, resting on a granite plinth in the middle of a depressed basin. The bronze sculpture was created by H.E. Freund and replaced a sandstone figure with the same motif which was made by the French sculptor le Clerc and placed in the garden in 1738.

The monument to Viggo Hørup was designed by Jens Ferdinand Willumsen and installed in 1907 at the initiative of the newspaper Politiken which he had co-founded in 1884. The monument was blown up by the Germans in 1945, shortly before the end of World War II, but a new cast was made after the war. The head of the original statue is on display in the J.F. Willumsens Museum.

== Image gallery ==
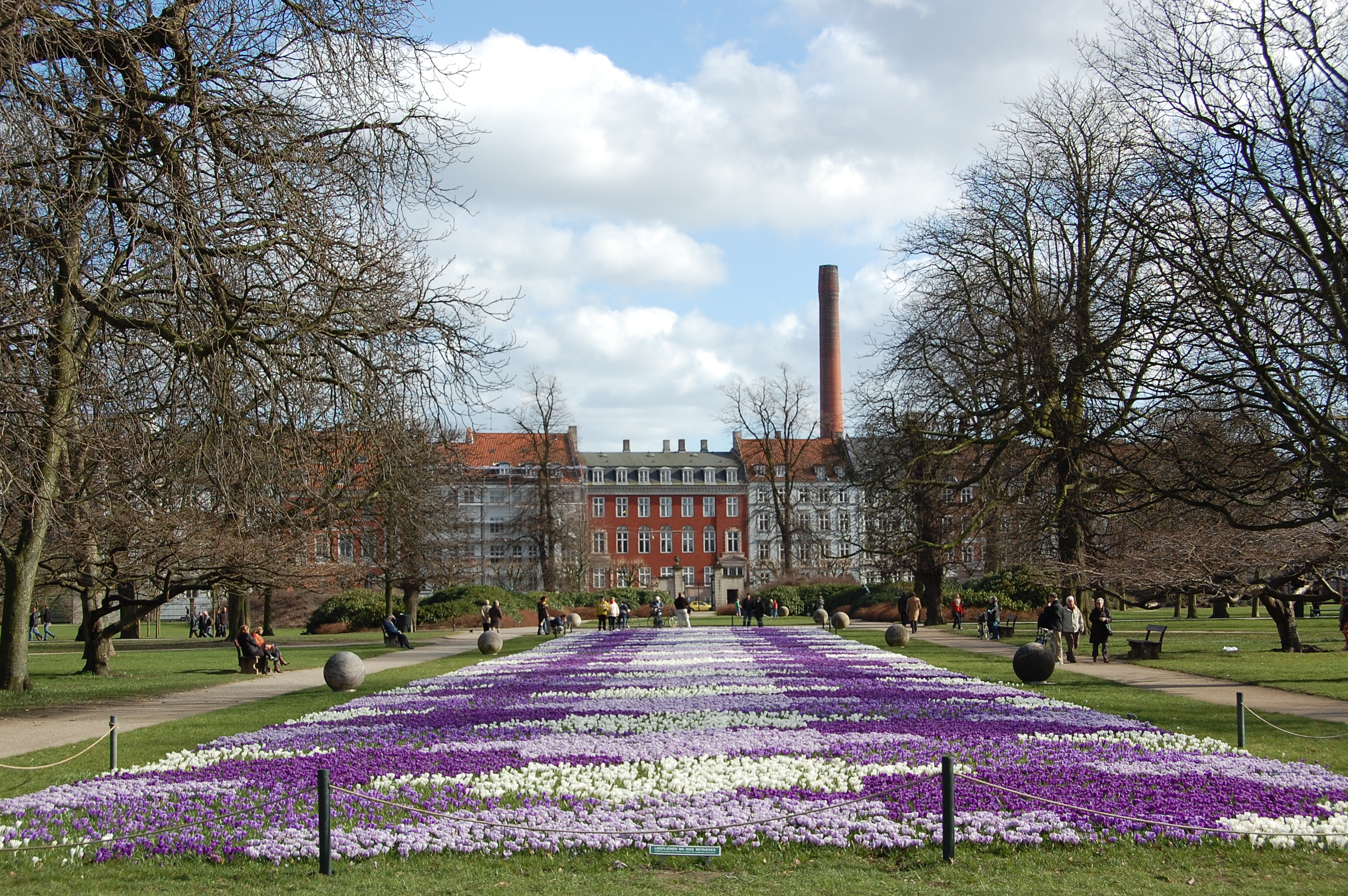
The flower lawn

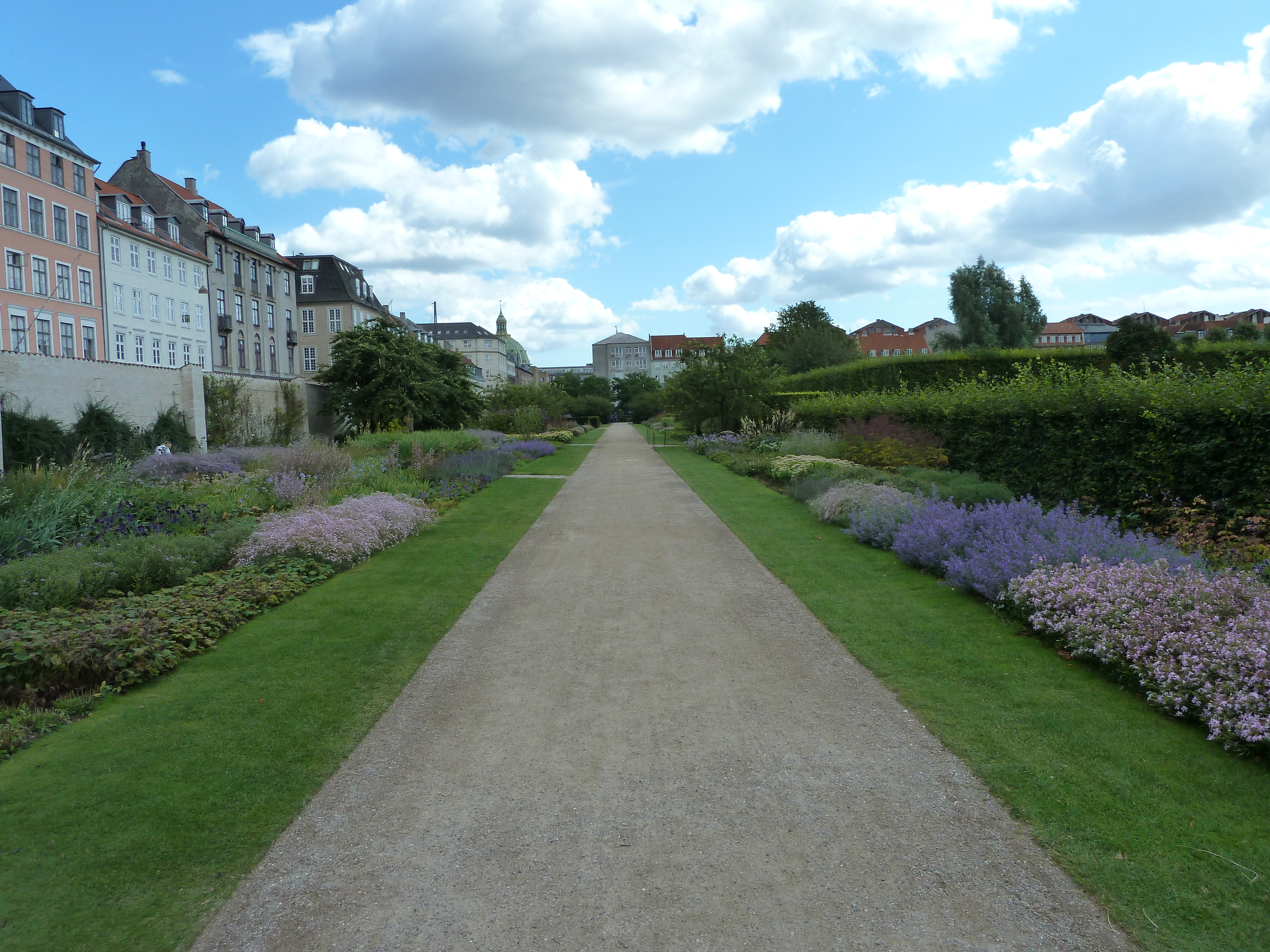
The perennials garden along Sølvgade

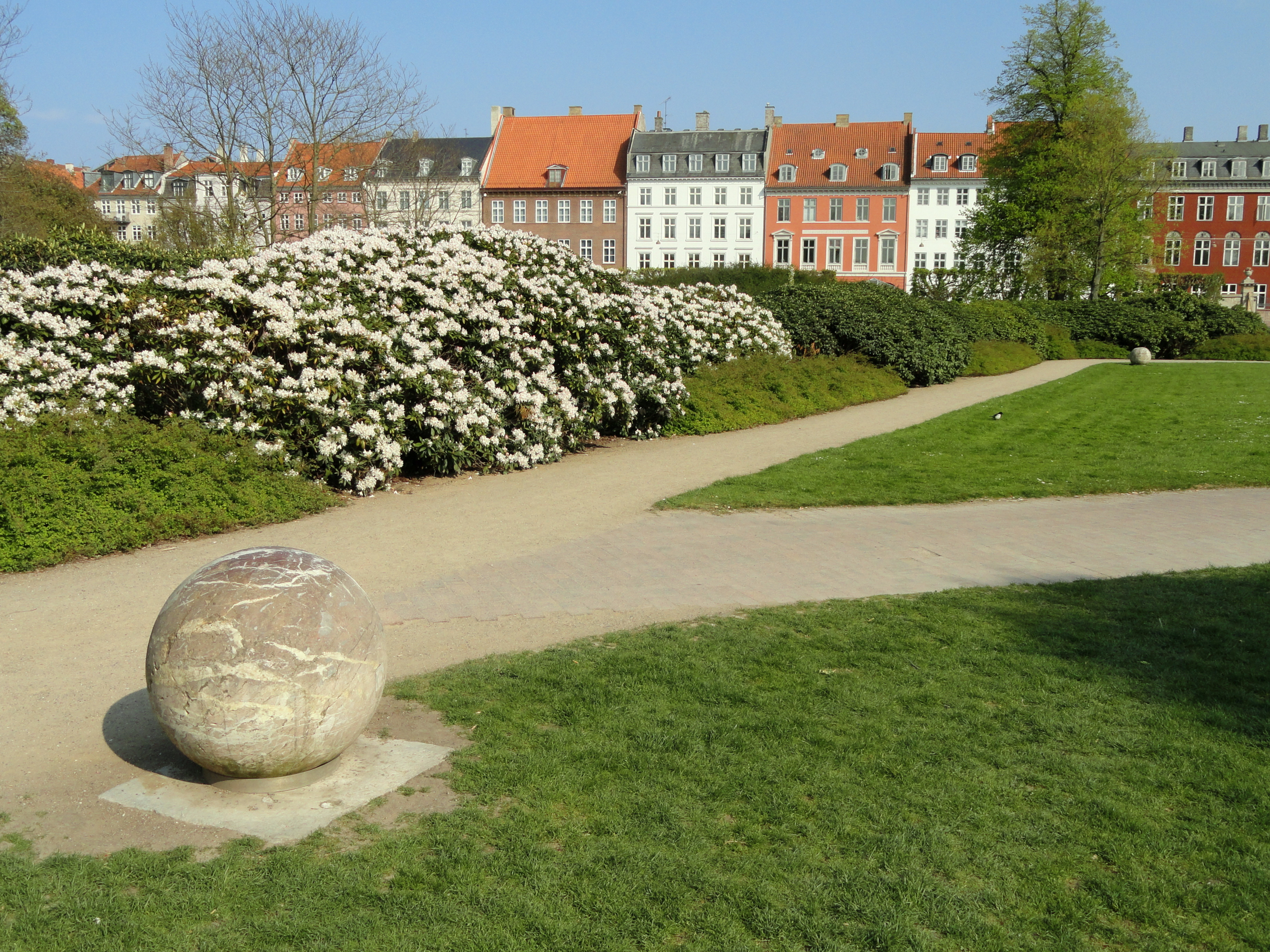
Flowering rhododendrons in the southern part of the park

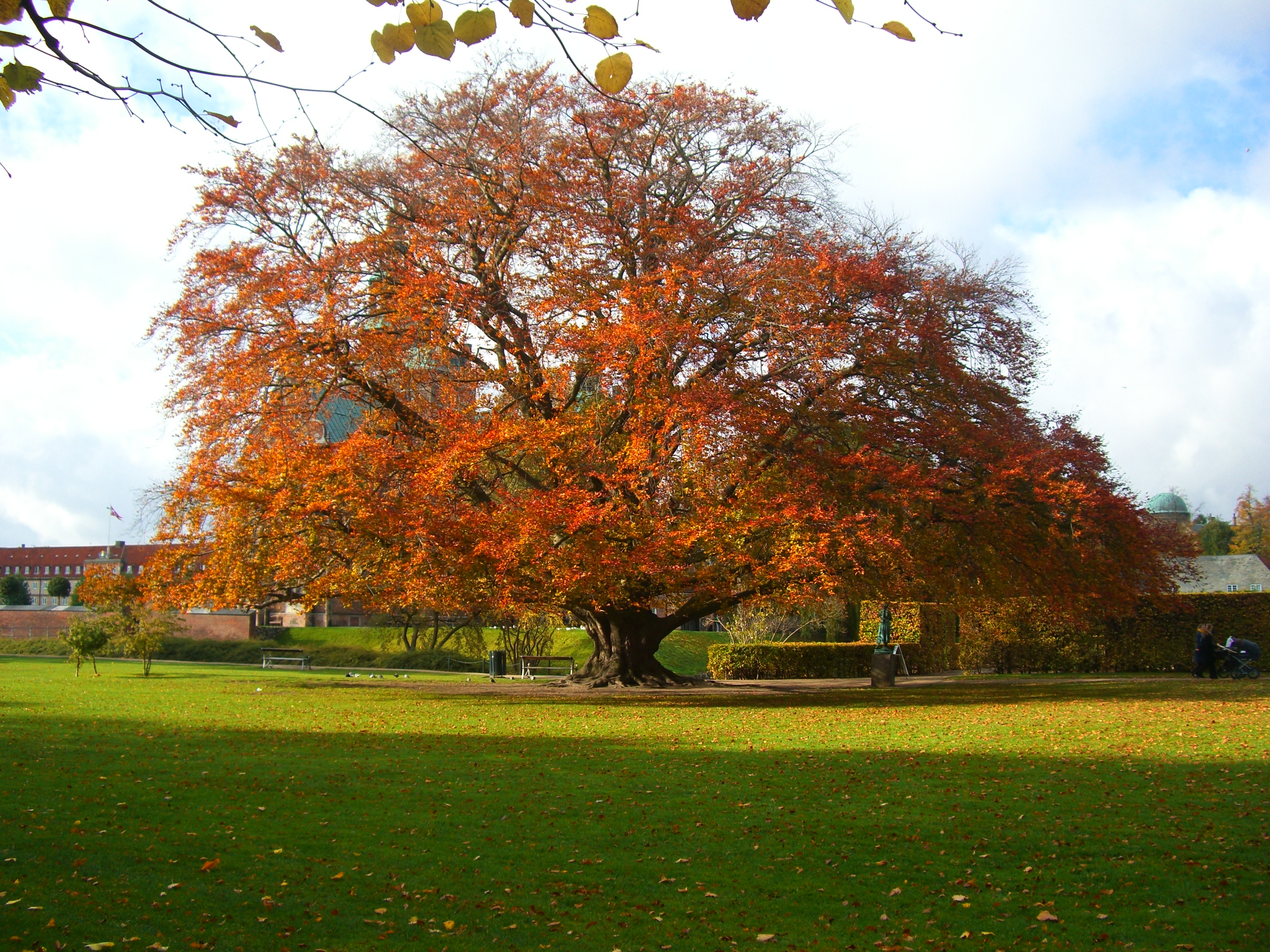
Tree near the castle

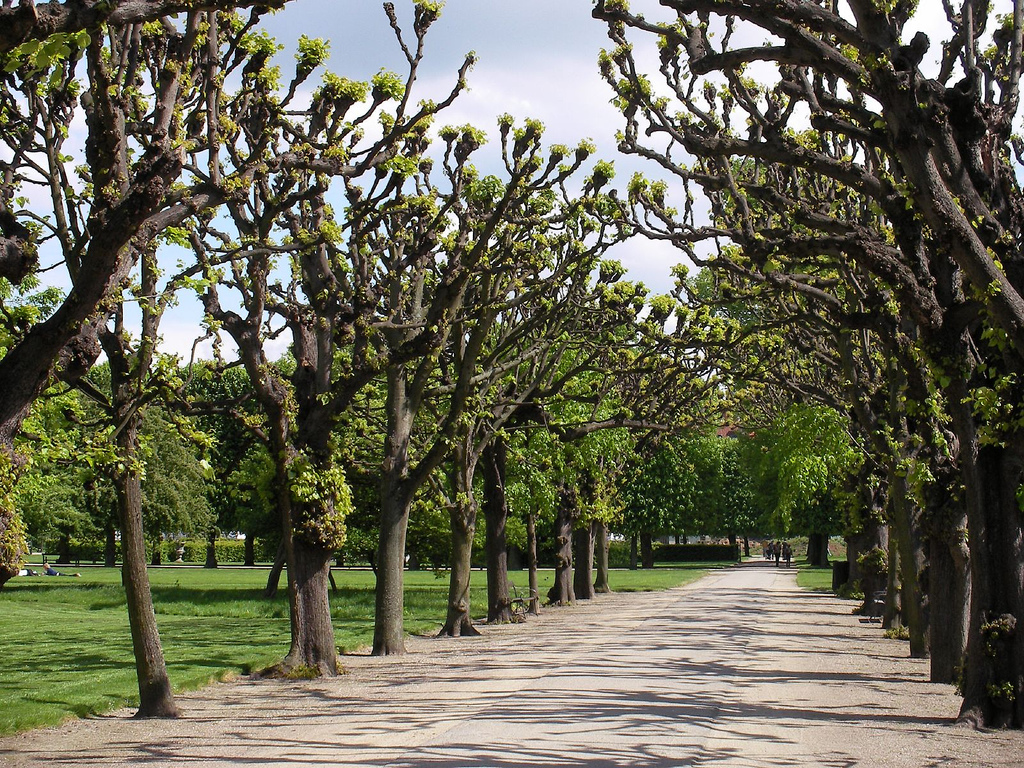
A tree-lined path

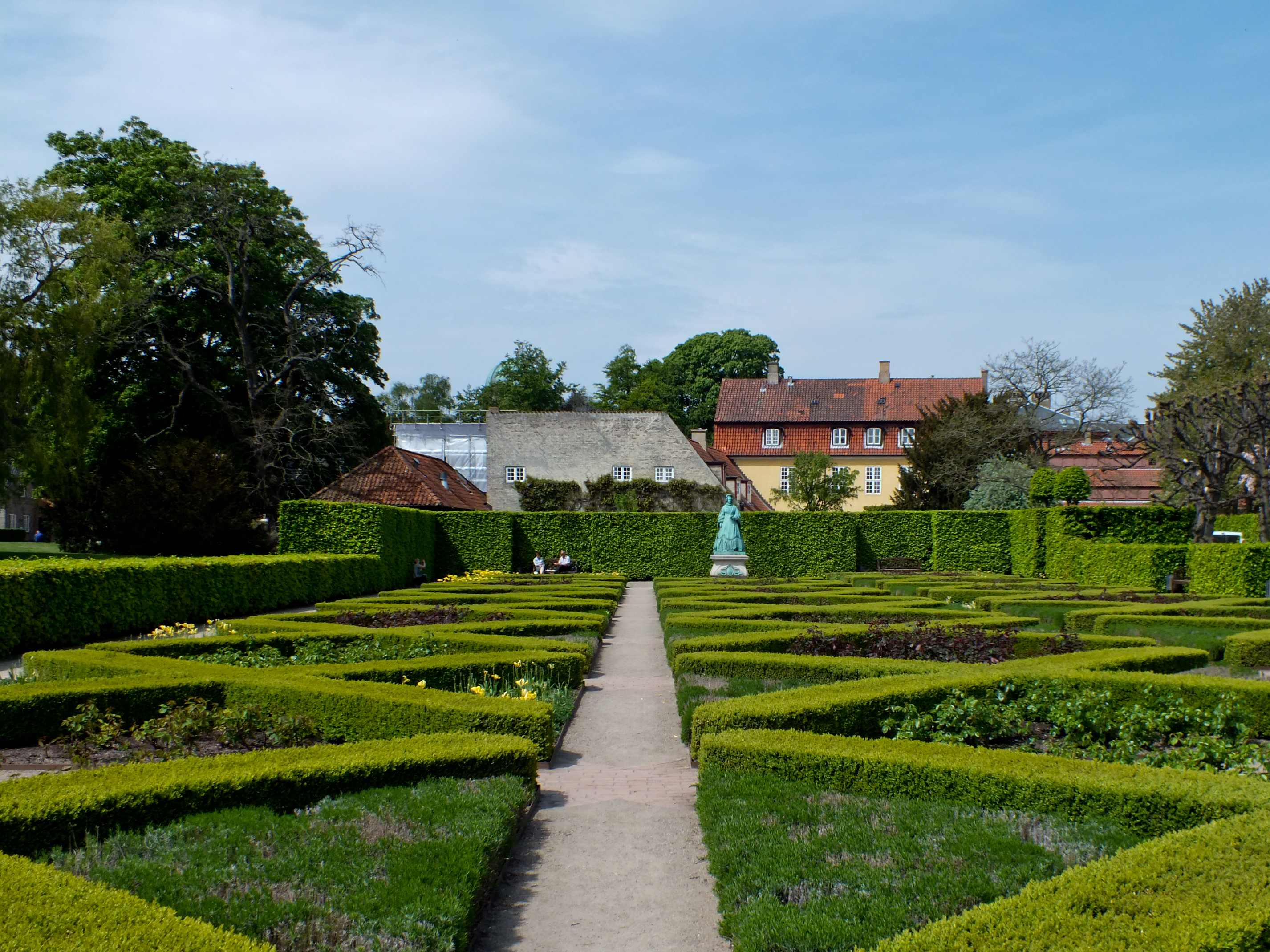
The Rose Garden

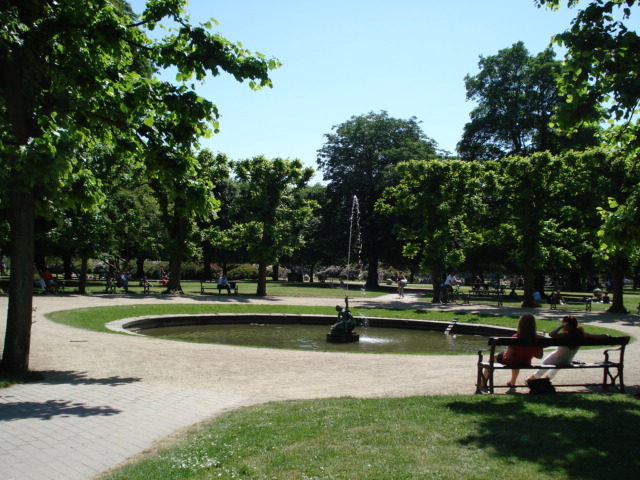
Fountain

== See also ==
- Parks and open spaces in Copenhagen
