= Gothersgade =

Street in Copenhagen, Denmark

Coordinates: 55°41′06″N 12°34′35″E

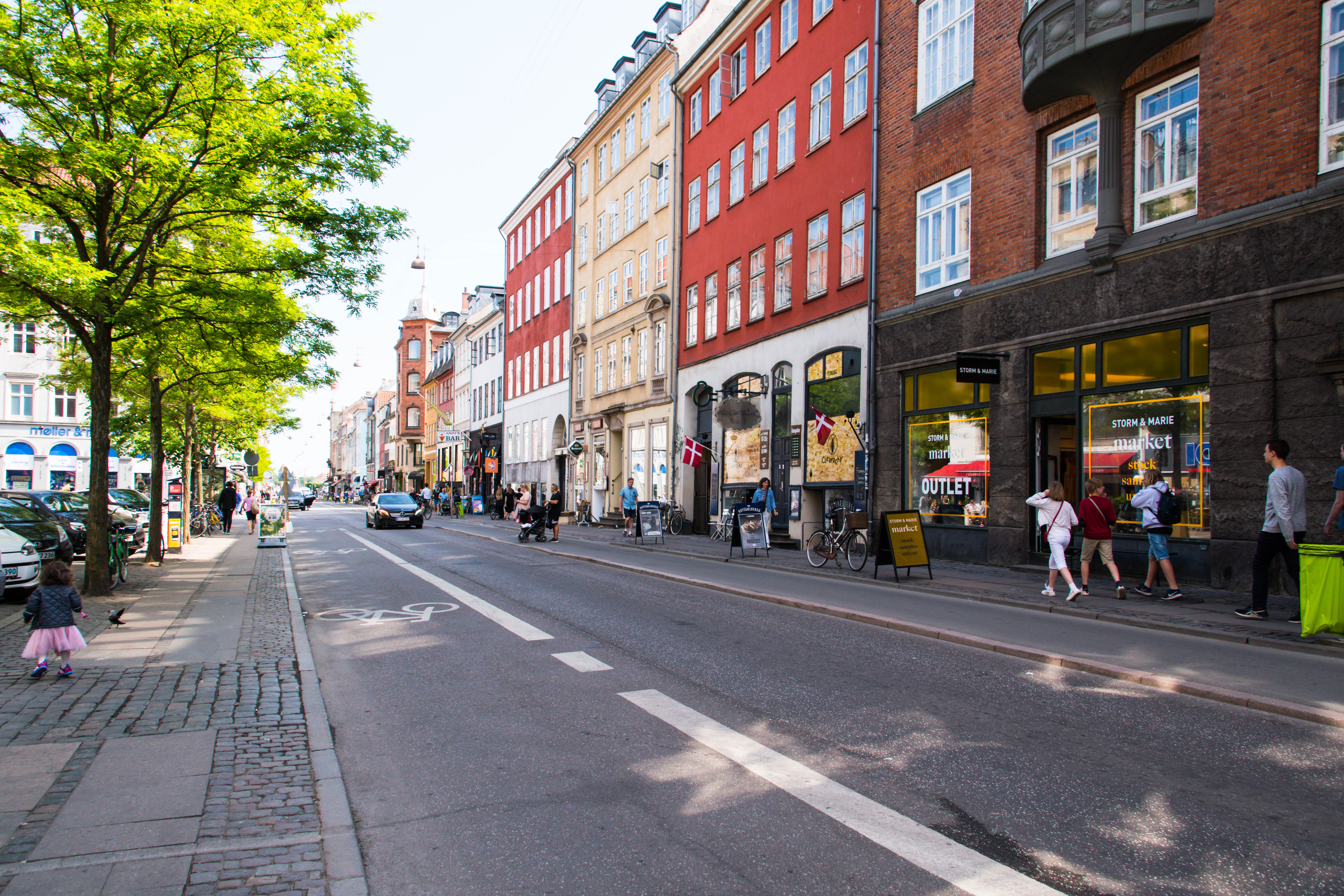
Gothersgade view from Kongens Nytorv

Gothersgade (Danish pronunciation: [ˈkoˀtɐsˌkɛːðə]; see below) is a major street in the City Centre of Copenhagen, Denmark. It extends from Kongens Nytorv to Sortedam Lake, passing Rosenborg Castle and Gardens, Nørreport Station and Copenhagen Botanic Gardens on the way.

Every day at 11:30 am, the Royal Life Guards, who are based at Rosenborg Barracks, depart from Rosenborg Eksercerplads and march down Gothersgade and up Bredgade for the ceremonial changing of the guard at 12 noon at Amalienborg Palace Square.

== History ==
Gothersgade runs along the original course of the Eastern Rampart of Copenhagen's former Fortification Ring. Originally called Ny Kongensgade, it was established in about 1647 after the Eastern Rampart had been taken in a more northerly direction to expand the fortified city with a large new area known as New Copenhagen. At his point the street only ran to the site of today's Nørreport Station where it met the fortifications just north-east of the North City Gate.

In 1870, after the fortifications had been decommissioned and their grounds leveled out, the street was extended to its current length.

In 1892, Copenhagen's first public electricity plant, Gothersgade elektriske Centralstation, opened at the corner of Gothergade and Adelsgade. It was installed behind the existing house fronts towards Gothergade and was unusual for its central location. It was later expanded and modernized several times. Since 1994, it had only served as a substation for distribution of electricity and central heating.

In 1920–30 the section of Gothersgade from Rosenborg Castle Gardens to Sortedam Lake was widened. In the process, Rosenborg Barracks was shortened with two bays and the drill house from 1787 and Brøndkuranstalten in front of Rosenborg Castle were demolished. A planned widening of the section of the street closest to Kongens Nytorv was later abandoned.

== The name ==
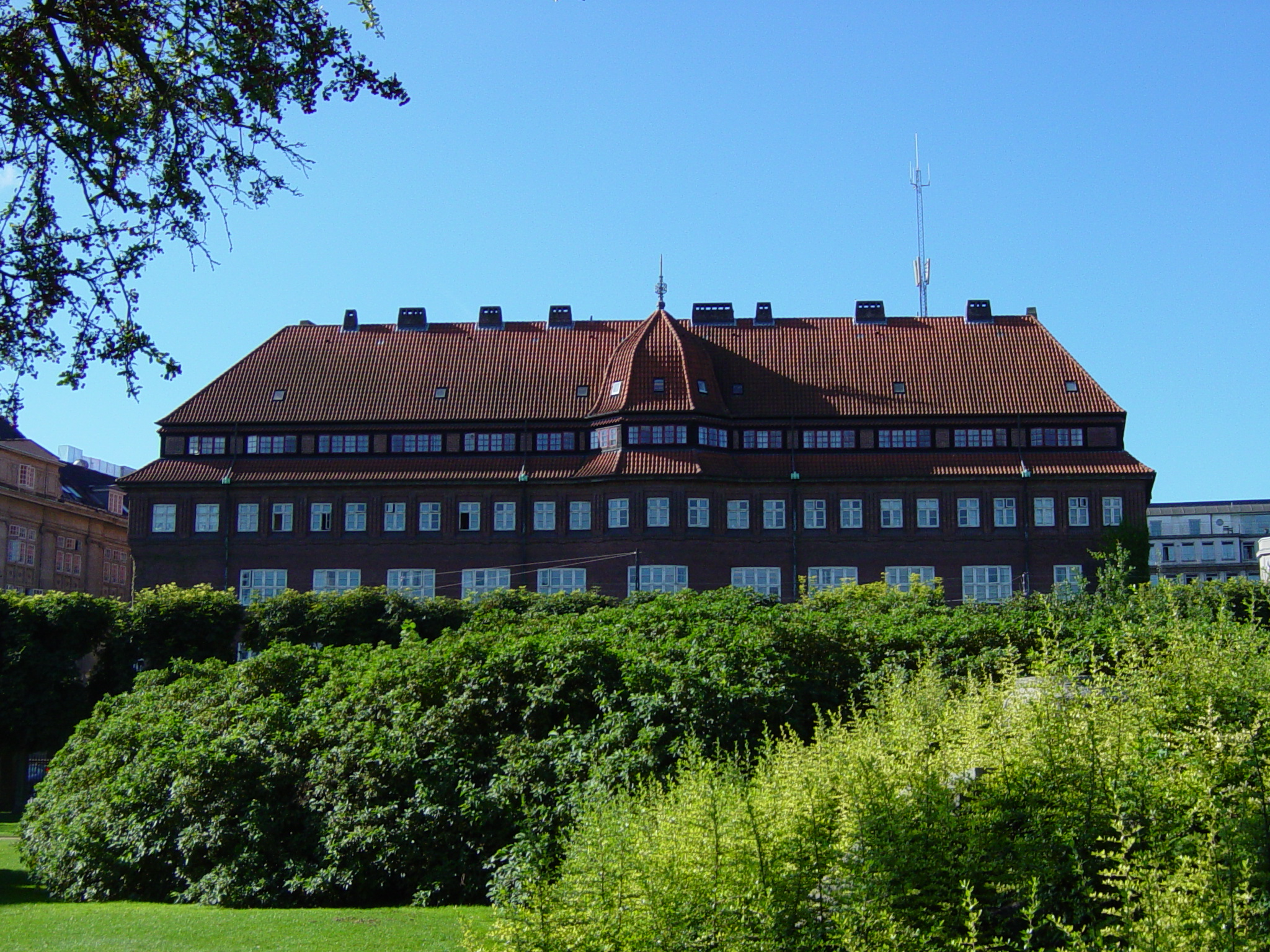
Copenhagen Lighting Company

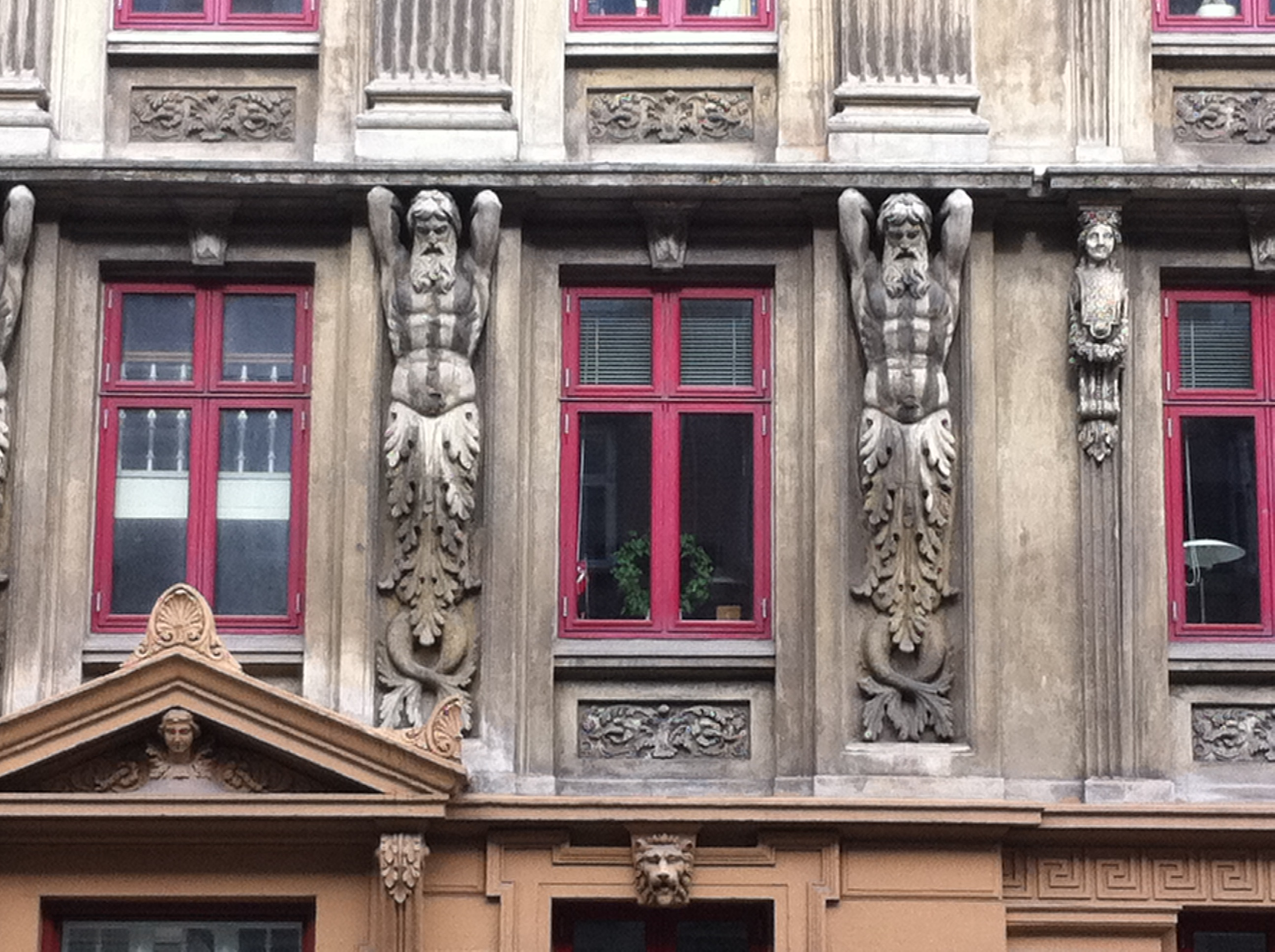
Facade detail near the Lakes

The prefix Gothers- in the street name refers to the Goths of the title King of the Goths and the Wends which was used by Danish kings from the 14th century until 1972. Vendersgade, which is Gothersgade's mirror image on the other side of Frederiksborggade, refers to the Wends of the same title.

== Notable buildings ==
- Baron Boltens Gård (8A Gothersgade)
- Copenhagen Lighting Company building
- Cinemateket, home of the Danish Film Institute (55 Gothersgade)
- King's Gate, one of the entrances to Rosenborg Castle Gardens, located diagonally from Queen's Gate
- Rosenborg Castle (4A Øster Voldgade)
- Rosenborg Barracks (100 Gothersgade)
- Reformed Church (109 Gothersgade)
- Nørreport Station
- Entrance to University of Copenhagen Botanical Garden
- Faculty Library of Social Sciences (140 Gothersgade)
- St. Andrew's Church (148 Gothersgade)
- Kunstnerhjemmet

== See also ==
- Bredgade
- Borgergade
- Gammel Mønt
