= Rosenborg Barracks =

Coordinates: 55°41′06″N 12°34′31″E

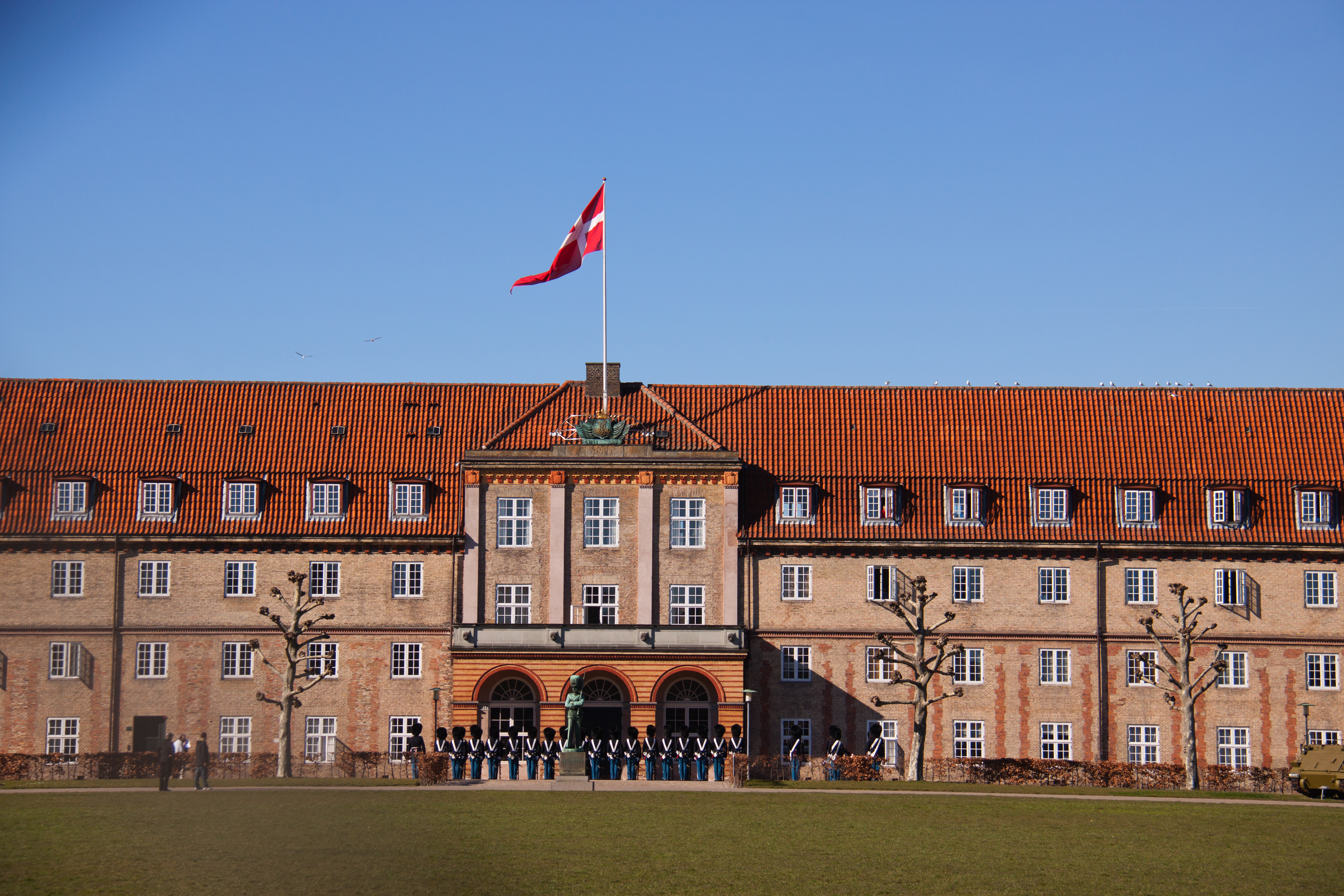

General information
- Architectural style: Baroque
- Location: Copenhagen, Denmark
- Construction started: 1670
- Completed: 1786
- Client: Christian IV (original pavilion)

Design and construction
- Architects: Johan Cornelius Krieger; Ernst Peymann

Rosenborg Barracks (Danish: Livgardens Kaserne ved Rosenborg), one of two barracks of the Royal Danish Life Guard, is located next to Rosenborg Castle in Copenhagen, Denmark. Its address is Gothersgade but it has a long facade along Øster Voldgade.

== History ==
=== Christian V's orangery ===
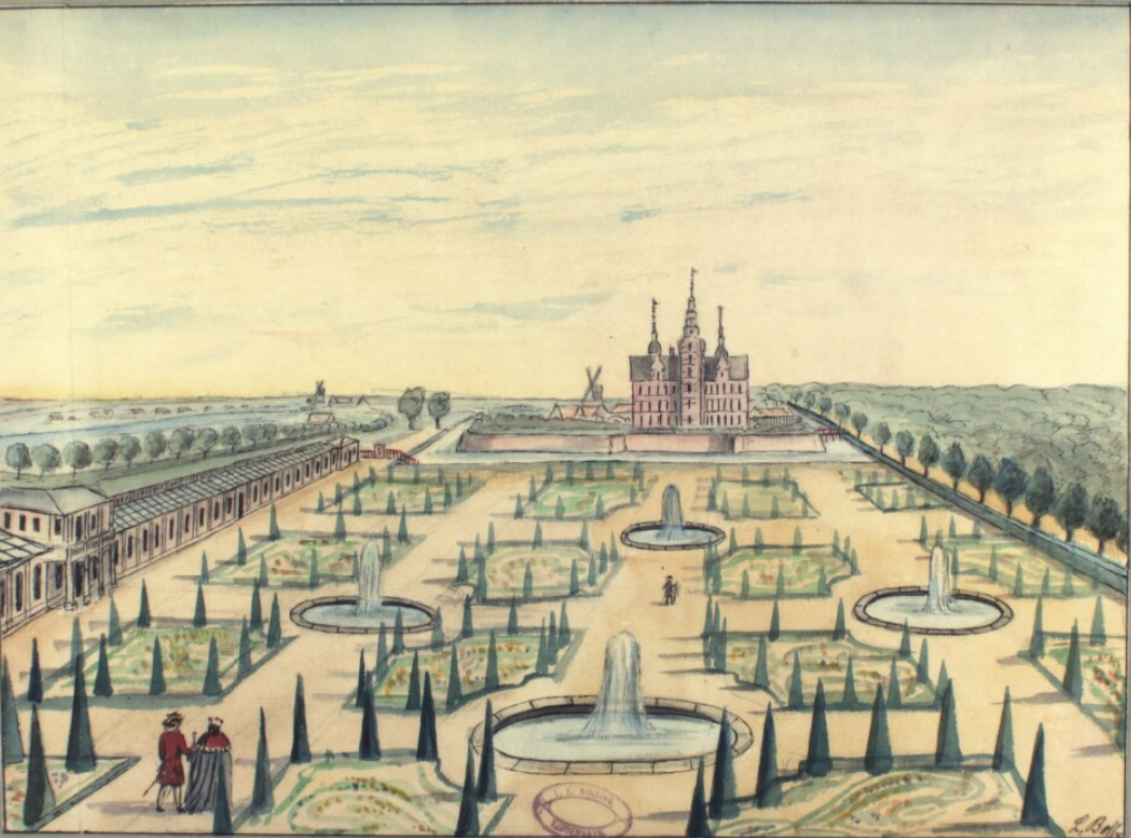
The prangery seen to the left on a drawing from 1749

The building originates in King Christian V's pavilion which was built in 1670 with the assistance of architect Lambert van Haven. It was flanked by two long orangerie wings, one on each side, which ran parallel to the new Eastern Rampart which had been constructed in the 1650s. The central pavilion was often used for royal banquets, supplementing Christian IB's old pavilion which the king converted into a more intimate Hermitage.

=== The Laurel House ===
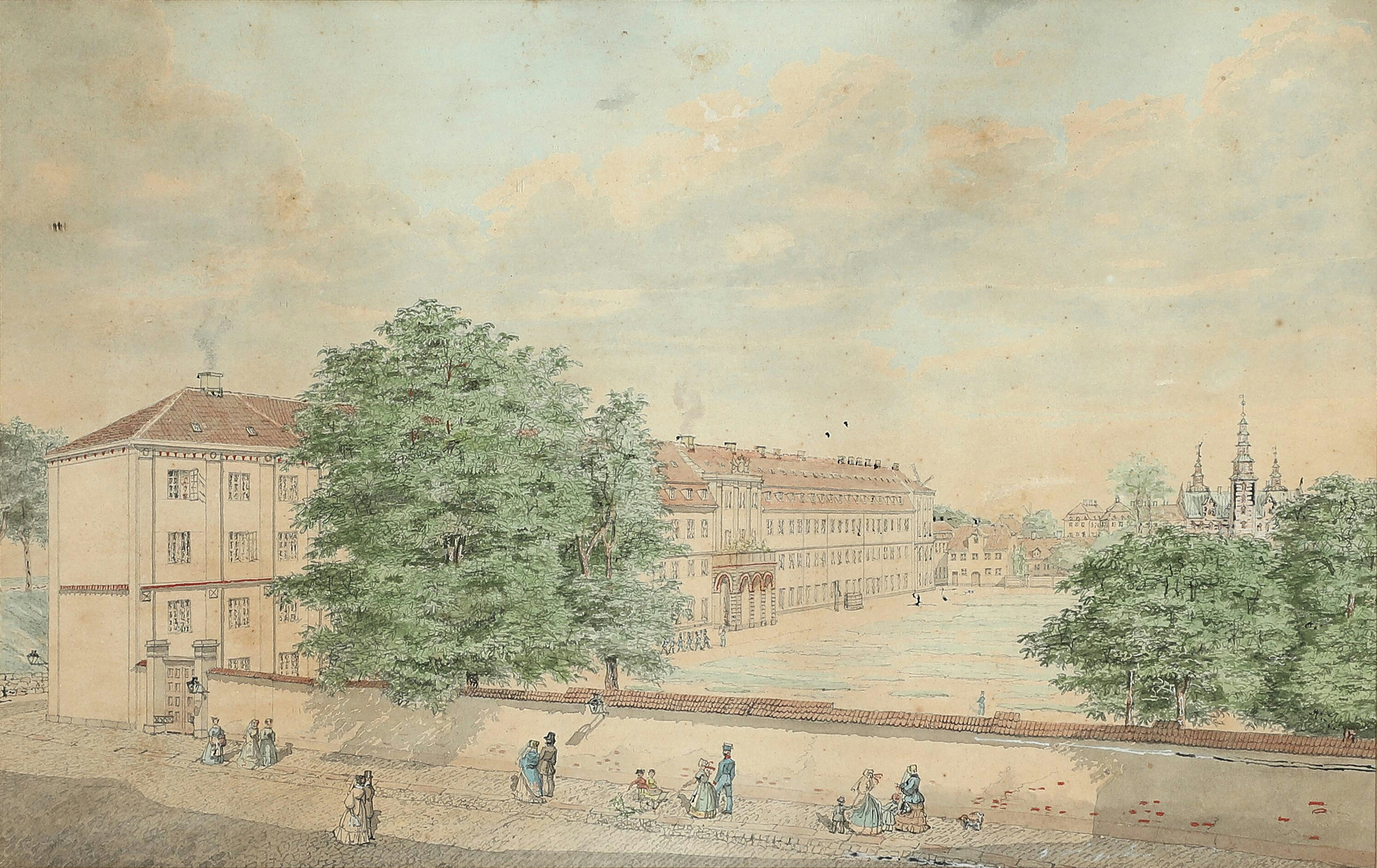
Rosenborg Barracks on a drawing by H.G.F. Holm from the 1830s

In 1709, the entire complex was interconnected to form one long building, known as the Orangerie. In 1743 the building was adapted into the Baroque style by Johan Cornelius Krieger and the name was changed to Laurierhuset (English: The Laurel House).

=== The Life Guards Barracks ===
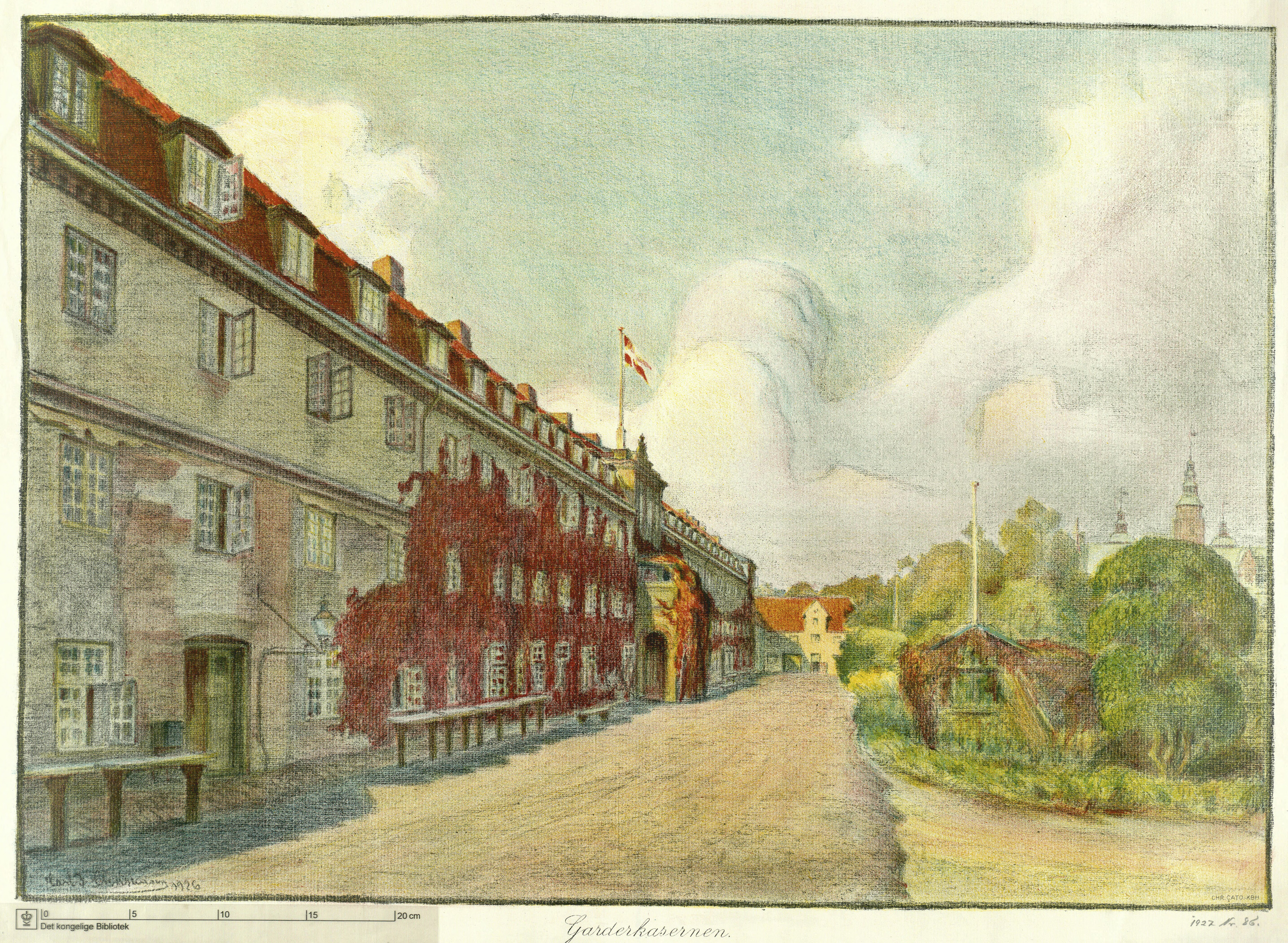
Rosenborg Barracks, 1027

When space became too sparse at Sølvgade Barracks, located on the other side of Rosenborg Gardens, Engineer Officer Ernst Peymann was charged with the task of converting the Laurel House into the new quarters of the Royal Life Guard. The work lasted from 1785 to 1786 and involved an extension of the building with an extra storey. In 1845 and 1930 further alterations were made.

== Rosenborg Barracks today ==
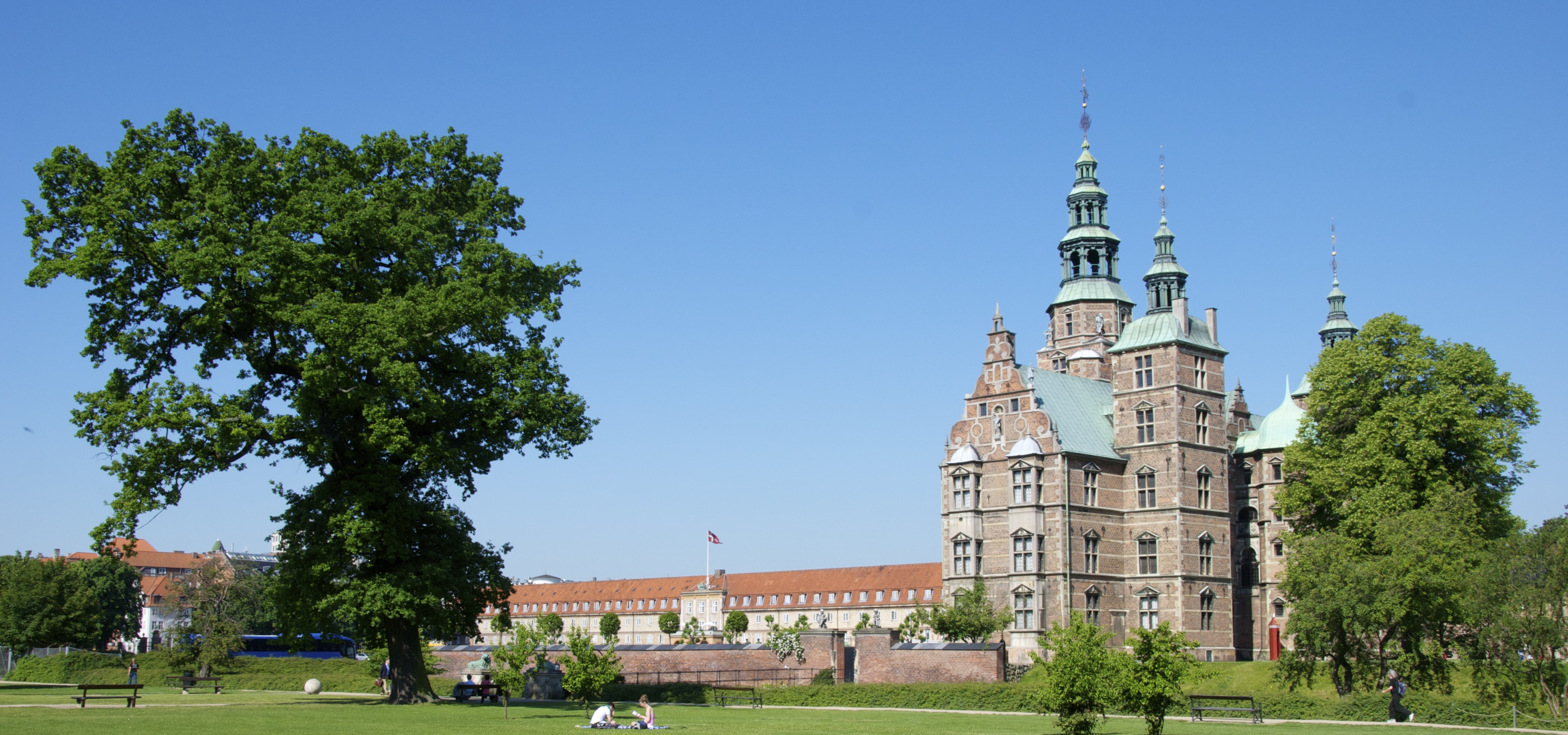
The barracks seen from Rosenborg Castle Gardens

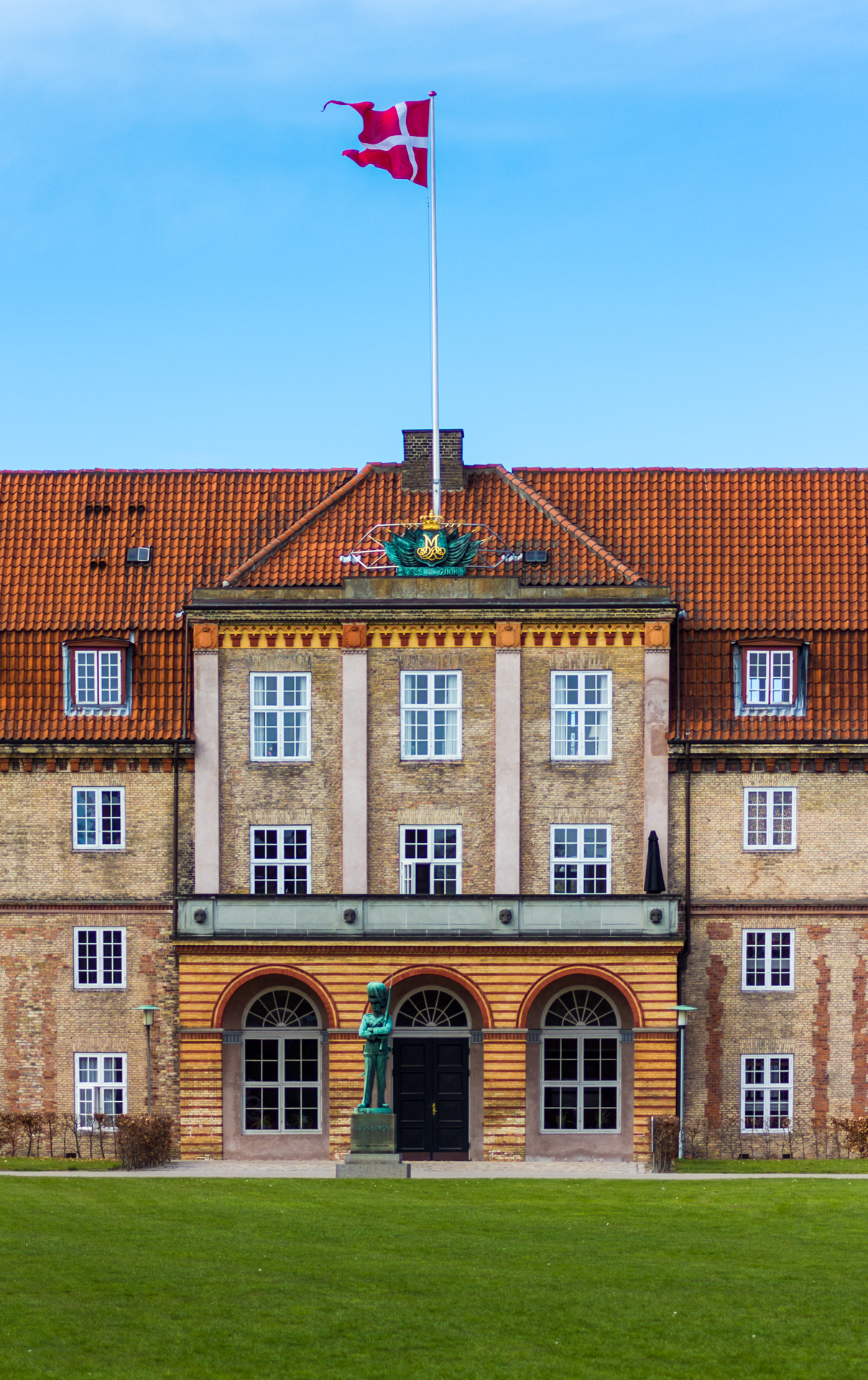
Courtyard view of the central pavilion

In 1985, the headquarters of the Royal Life Guard moved to Høvelte Barracks, located between Allerød and Birkerød north of Copenhagen. Since then Rosenborg Barracks only houses guards on duty at Amalienborg Palace, Rosenborg Castle or Christiansborg Palace.

== Royal Life Guards Museum ==
The buildings also contain a small museum dedicated to the history and artefacts of the Royal Life Guards, from their foundation in 1658 and to the present day. It was inaugurated on 12 January 1978.

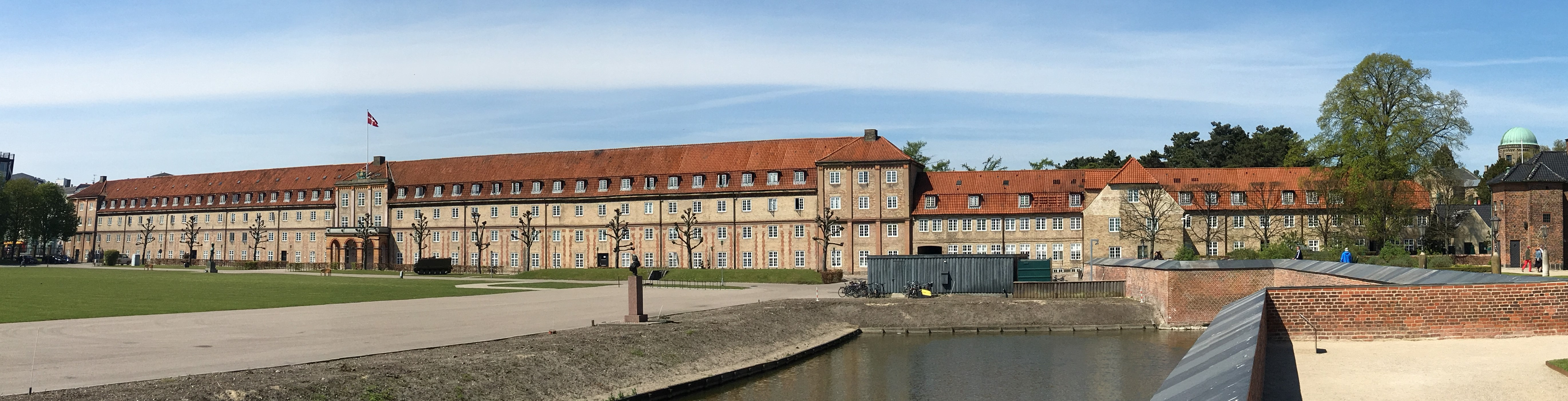
Rosenborg Barracks with Østervold Observatory visible on the far right

== See also ==
- Amalienborg Palace
- Old Artillery Barracks, Christianshavn
