= Sølvgade Barracks =

Former military facility in Copenhagen, Denmark

- Sølvgade Kasserne
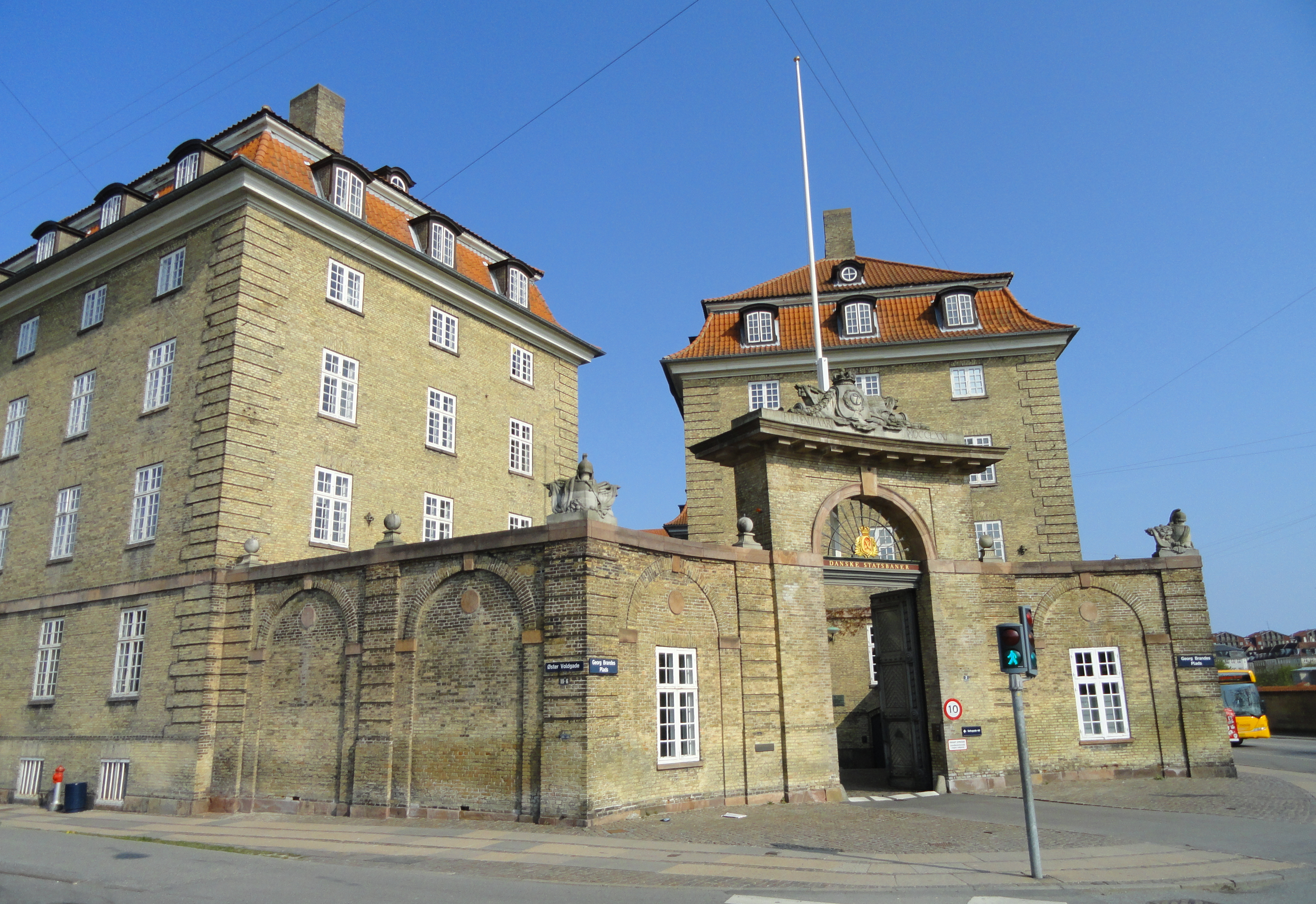
- The building seen from across the canal
- Interactive map of the Sølvgade Barracks area

General information
- Architectural style: Baroque
- Location: Copenhagen, Denmark, Denmark
- Coordinates: 55°41′15.1″N 12°34′48.1″E
- Construction started: 1769
- Completed: 1771
- Client: Frederick (V).

Design and construction
- Architect: Nicolas-Henri Jardin

Sølvgade Barracks (Danish: Sølvgade Kaserne) is a former military facility from 1771 located on the corner of Sølvgade and Øster Voldgade in central Copenhagen, Denmark. The barracks closed in 1926 and the large Baroque complex designed by Nicolas-Henri Jardin then served as headquarters for DSB, the Danish state railways, until 2013, when the building was converted into student apartments.

== History ==
=== The barracks ===
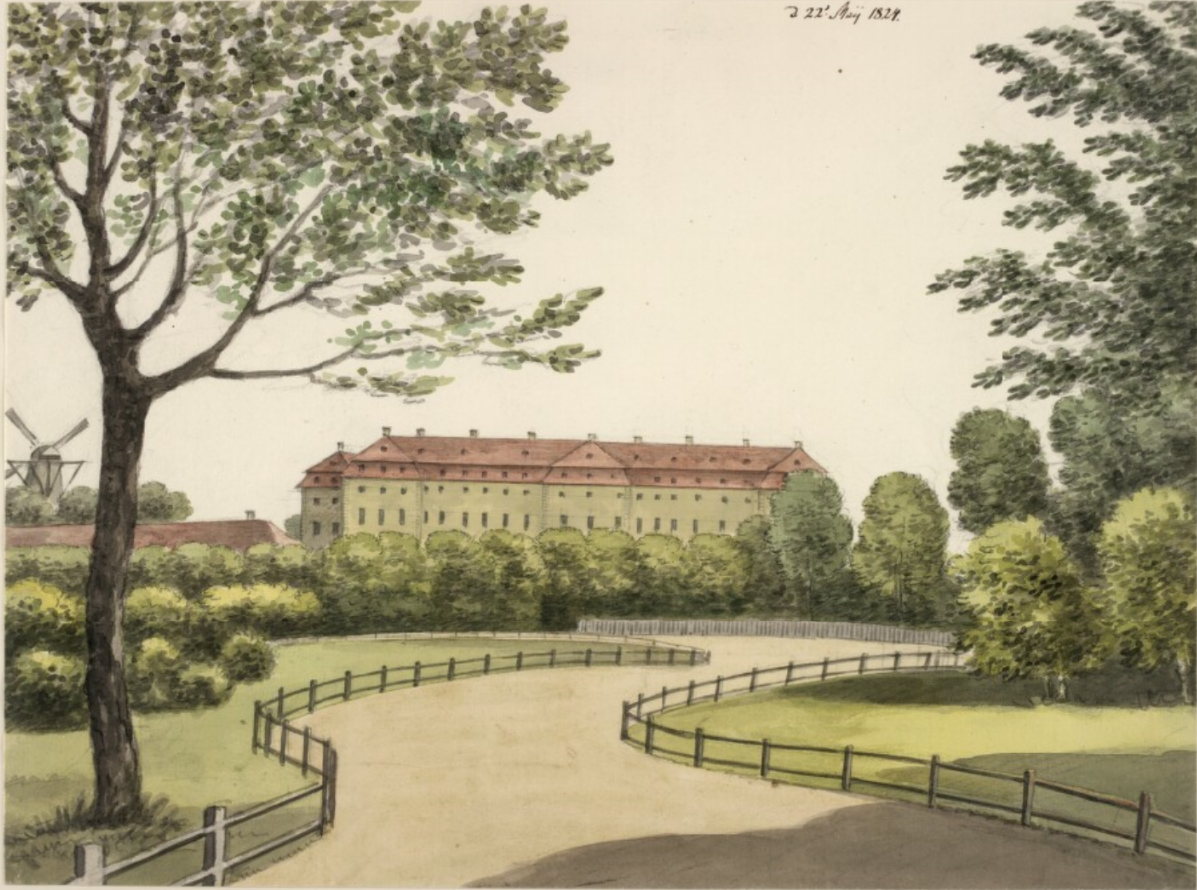
Ole Jørgen Rawert: Sølvgade Barracks seen from Rosenborg Gardens, 22 May 1924

Until the mid 18th century, soldiers from the garrison in Copenhagen were not quartered in barracks but boarded, usually two and two, with private families around the city. Personnel of the Royal Navy were quartered at Nyboder. In 1765, Frederick (V) ordered the construction of Sølvgade Barracks in the grounds of the former St. Ann's graveyard. Nicolas-Henri Jardin was charged with the design of the new installation which was completed in 1771 under the supervision of Christian Carl Pflueg.

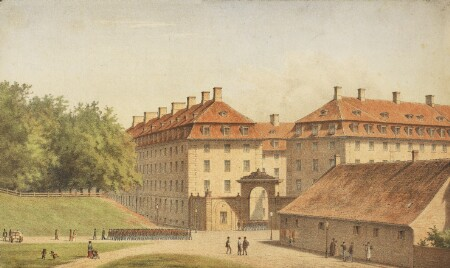
2ølvgade Barracks

The new barracks were met with opposition from the citizens of nearby Frederiksstaden who had lost an extra source of income. From 1775 the buildings were instead used as a military hospital (Frederiks Plejehus og Almindelig Hospital) but then in 1785 they once again came to serve as barracks. When space became too sparse in the facility, the Laurel House in Rosenborg Castle Gardens was converted into a new home for the Royal Life Guards, Rosenborg Barracks, which was inaugurated in 1786 to a design by military engineer Ernst Peymann.

=== DSB headquarters ===
In 1926 the barracks were decommissioned and the complex was converted into a new headquarters for the Danish State Railways. The adaption of the buildings for their new use was carried out by Theodor Petersen between 1926 and 1929. In October 2011, DSB announced their intentions to sell their headquarters at Sølvgade and concentrate their activities at Kalvebod Brygge near Copenhagen Central Station.

=== Student residences ===
After the DSB headquarters was moved, the building was converted into student residences by BaseCamp. Over 400 students are accommodated, including international and Danish students from several universities, including the University of Copenhagen. The first students moved in during autumn 2016.

== Architecture ==
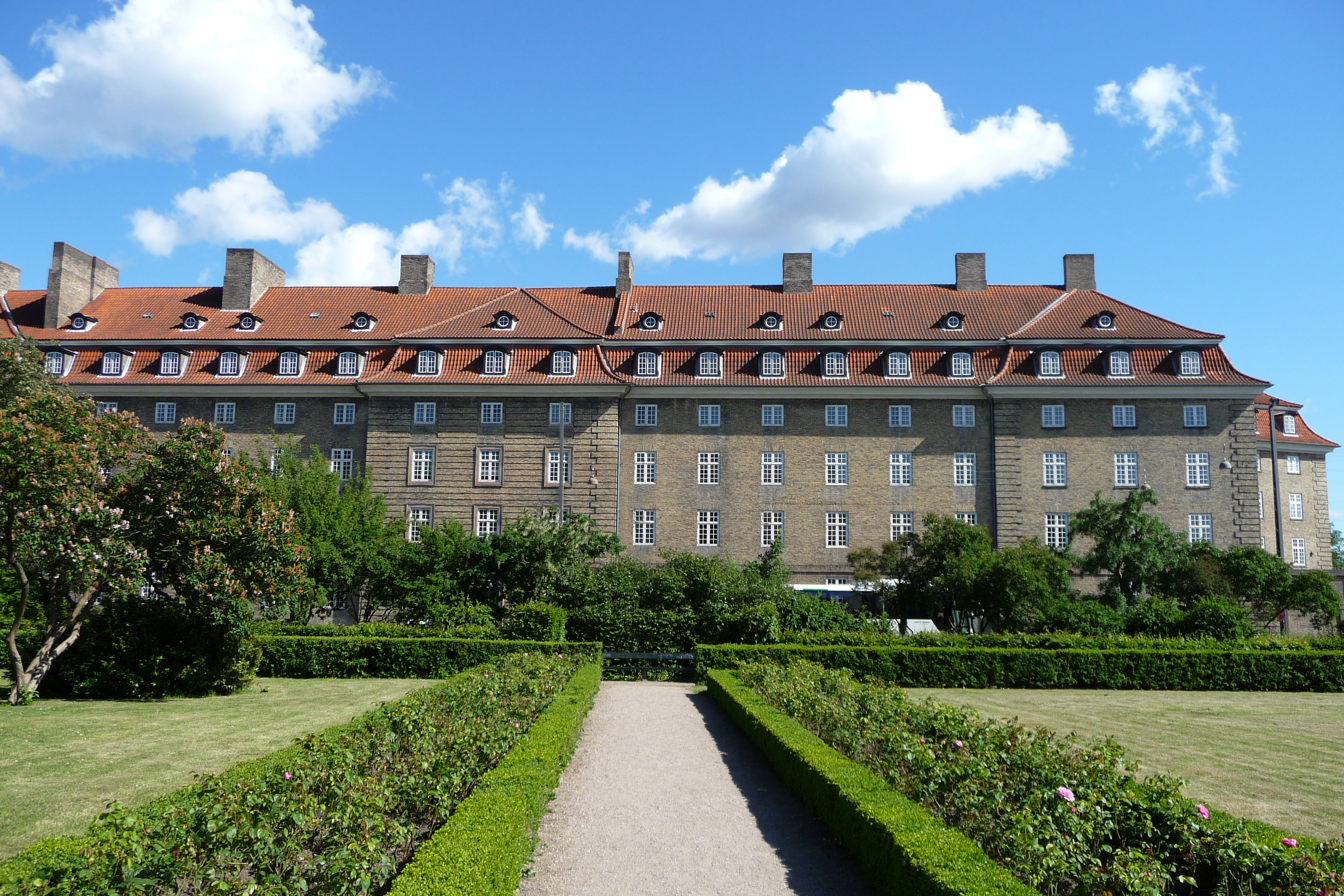
The facade towards Sølvgade seen from Rosenborg Castle Garden

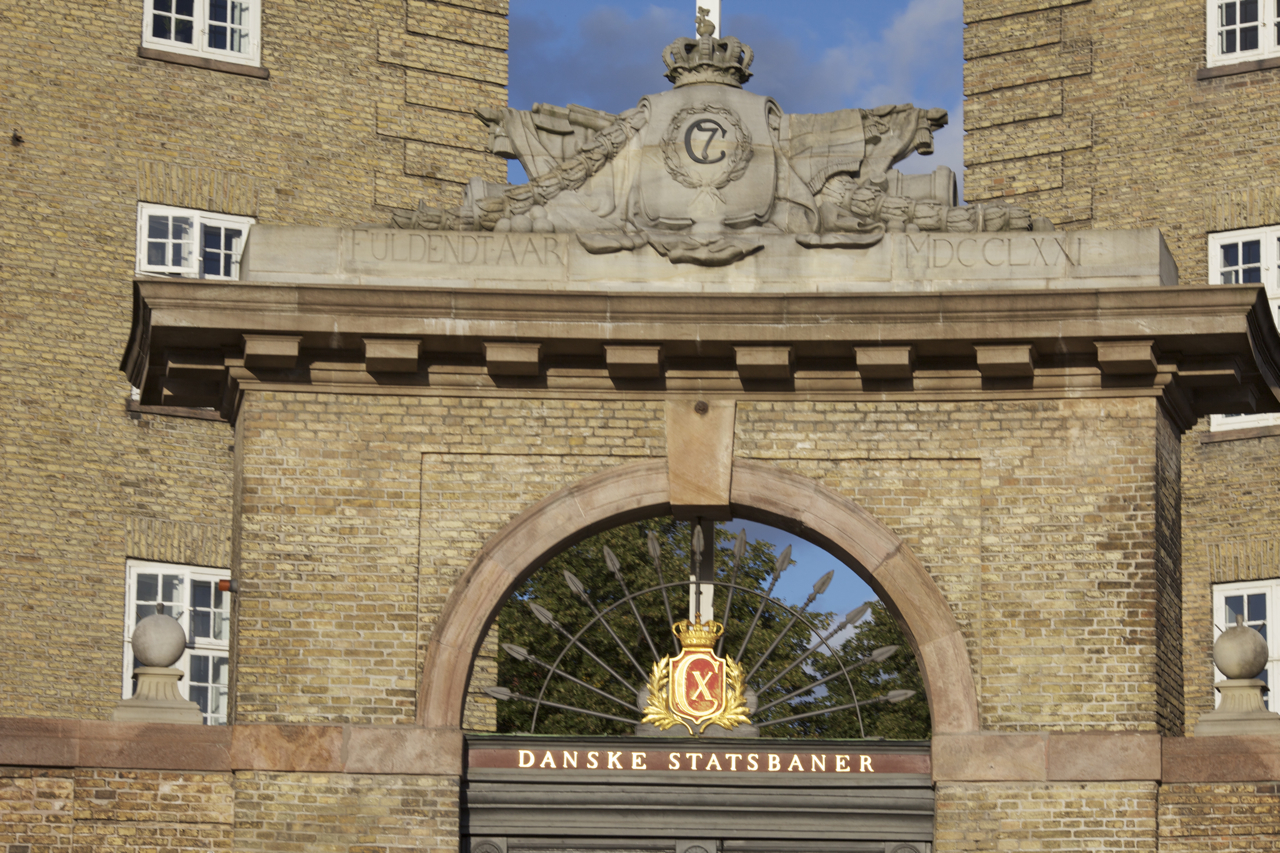
Detail of the gate

Built in brick in the Baroque style, the building complex consists of two F-shaped buildings, one along Sølvgade and one along Øster Voldgade, which face each other, and closed at the corner by a low gate wing. This layout may have been chosen as a reference to King Frederik V's name. The two main wings along the streets each consist of a cellar and four storeys under a red Mansard roof. Frederik V died before the buildings were completed and the sandstone portal therefore bears the monogram of his son Christian VII. The two main wings are 86 metres long and have 3-bay median and corner risalits. The buildings were listed in 1918.

== See also ==
- Old Artillery Barracks, Christianshavn
- Rosenborg Barracks
- Østerbrogade Barracks
