= Peymann =

Peymann is a surname of German origin. Notable people with the surname include:

- Claus Peymann (1937–2025), German theatre director and manager
- Ernst Peymann (1737–1823), Danish army officer
