= Sølvgade =

Street in Copenhagen, Denmark

Coordinates: 55.6872°N 12.5800°E

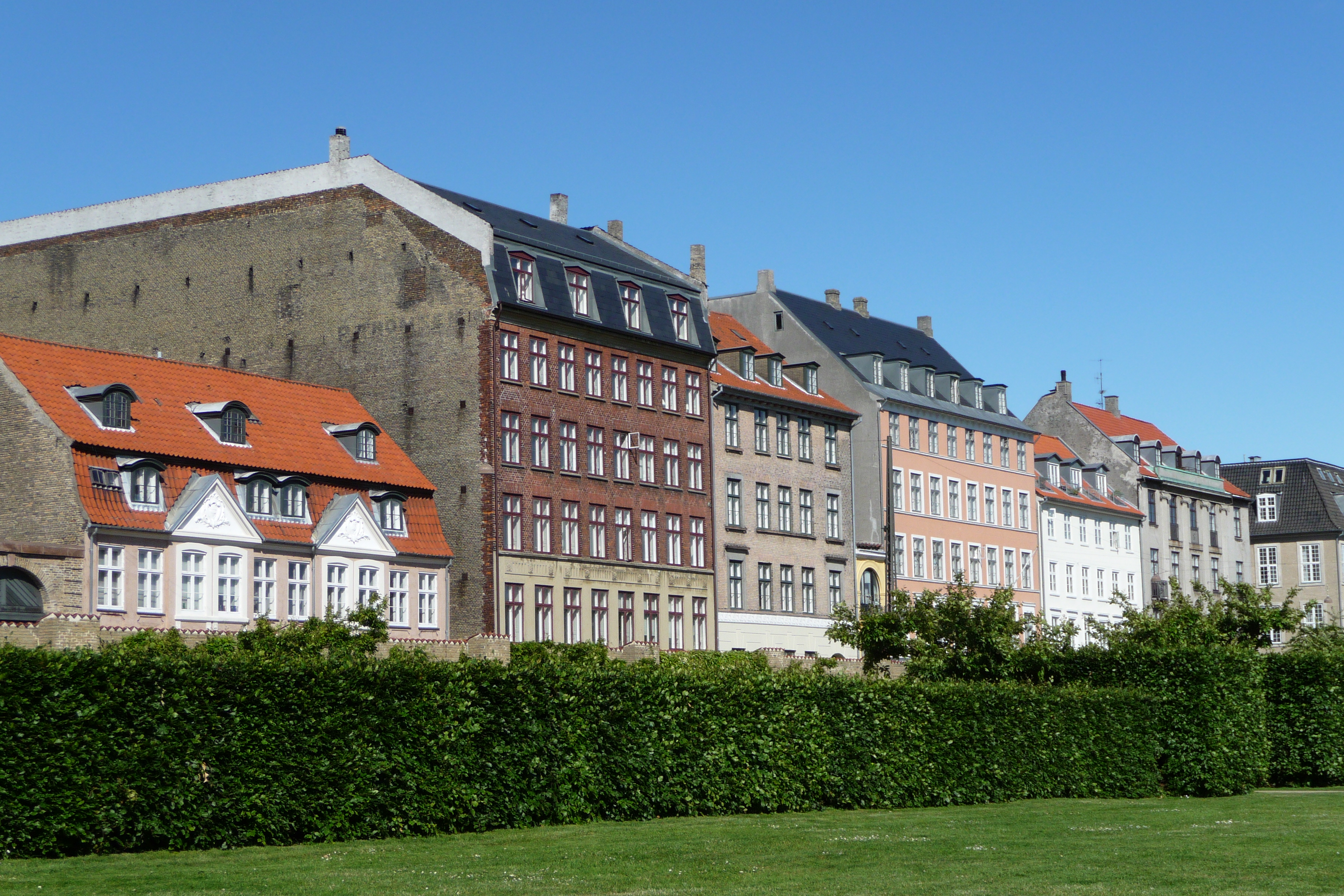
Sølvgade seen from Rosenborg Castle Garden

Sølvgade (Danish pronunciation: [ˈsølˌkɛːðə]; lit. 'Silver Street') is a street in central Copenhagen, Denmark, extending north-west from Borgergade to The Lakes where Fredens Bro connects it to Fredensgade. The section from Kronprinsessegade to Øster Voldgade follows the walled north-eastern margin of Rosenborg Castle Garden and the next section, from Øster Voldgade to the intersection with Farimagsgade, named Sølvtorvet (pronounced [ˈsølˌtsʰɒˀwð̩]; 'Silver Square') although it is little more than a busy street junction, separates Copenhagen Botanical Garden from Østre Anlæg.

== History ==
Like the other streets in the area, Sølvgade originates in the masterplan for New Copenhagen which was created in 1649. The street was one in a series of streets in the Nyboder neighbourhood that were named after minerals. All of the other streets have now disappeared.

The original street only ran from Adelgade to the East Rampart at present day Øster Voldgade. St. Ann's Graveyard was from the beginning located at the northern end of the street, opposite Rosenborg Castle Gardem. St. Ann's Rotunda, which had commenced construction in 1640 but never been completed, was blown up in 1668. Still known as St. Ann's Graveyard, the site was then used as a drill ground until it was finally built over with buildings such as the Gold House, the Stocks House and Sølvgade Barracks which was completed in 1771.

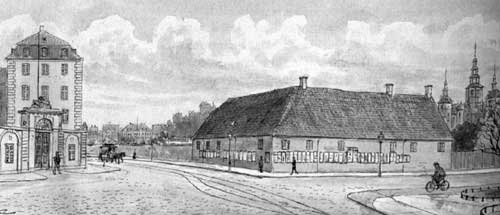
The extended Sølvgade in 1898 with Sølvgade Barracks on the left

When Copenhagen's fortifications were decommissioned and removed in the 1860s, Sølvgade was extended all the way to The Lakes. The first Fredens Bro, the bridge at the end of the street, then a relatively narrow wooden structure, was built in 1878. It was replaced by the current, broad embankment in 1977.

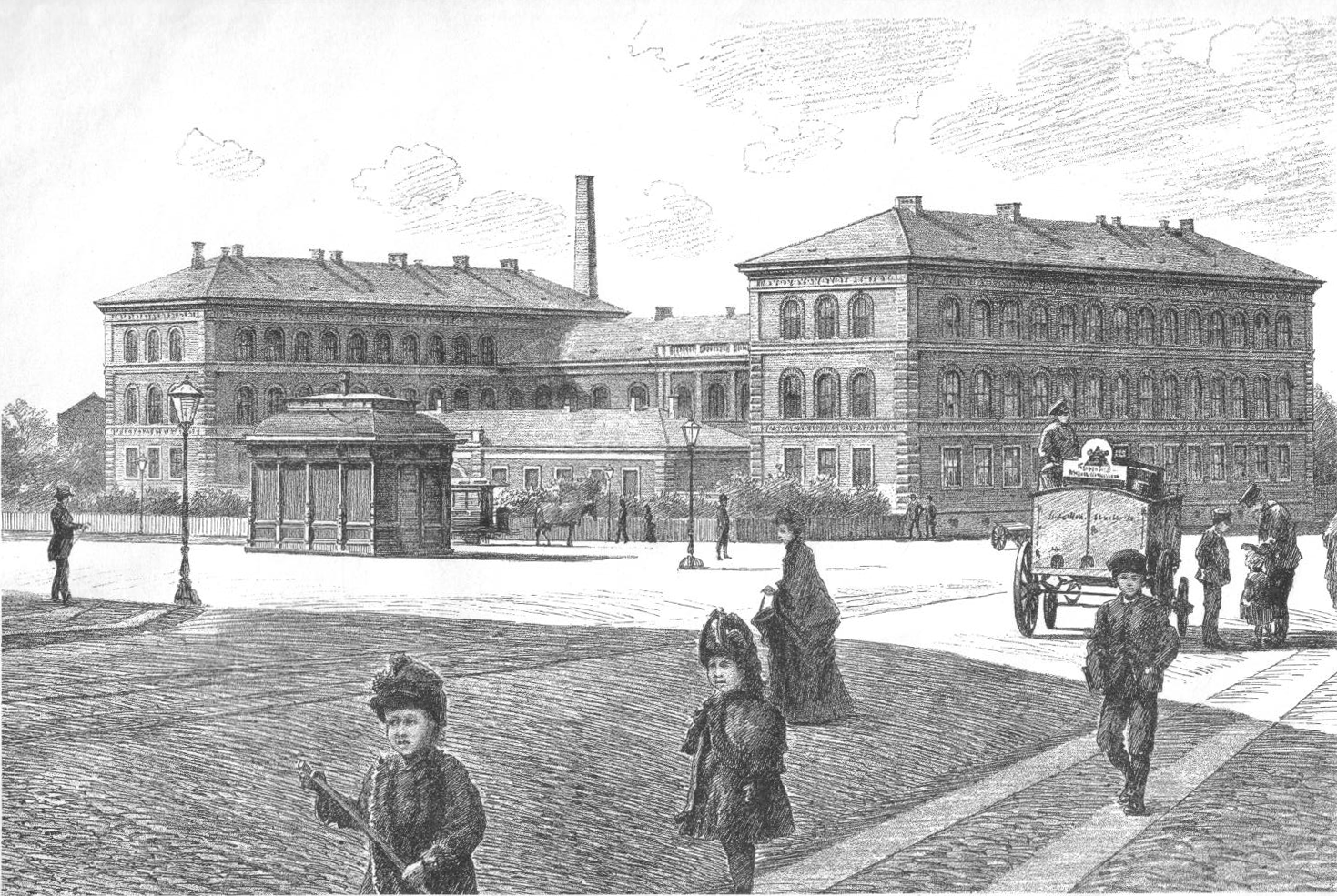
Sølvtorvet

Sølvtorvet was created in connection with the establishment of Stockholmsgade in the 1880s. The new buildings for the College of Advanced Technology (now DTU) opened on the square in 1890. It was built to a design by Johan Daniel Herholdt, who had been teaching at the institution from 1860 to 1875. The institution later moved to a new building on Øster Voldgade in the 1930s.

In the 1940s, when Adelgade and Borgergade underwent extensive urban renewal, Sølvgade saw another extension, now in its other end, to Borgergade.

== The Parks Museums ==
There are currently plans to build a new home of the Natural History Museum along the Botanical Garden's boundary on Sølvgade, incorporating the former College of Advanced Technology's old complex as well as the Museum of Geology at the other corner.

The Natural History Museum and the National Gallery are together with a number of other museums in the area around Rosenborg Castle Garden, Botanical Garden and Østre Anlæg collectively called The Park Museums. The other museums in the collaboration are the David Collection in Kronprinsessegade, the Hirschsprung Collection in Stockholmsgade and the Danish Film Institute in Gothersgade.

== Notable buildings and residents ==
The most prominent building in the street is Sølvgade Barracks, a large Baroque complex completed in 1771 to a design by the French architect Nicolas-Henri Jardin. One of the two main wings is visible from Rosenborg Castle Garden.

Built in 1847, Sølvgade School at No. 16 was Denmark's first public school. It was designed by Peter Heinrich Christoph Hagemann.

The Holmblad House at No. 38 was built by Jacob Holmblad in 1776.

No. 22 is (from 1831) and No. 30 (from 1853) and No. 34 (from 1834) are also listed.

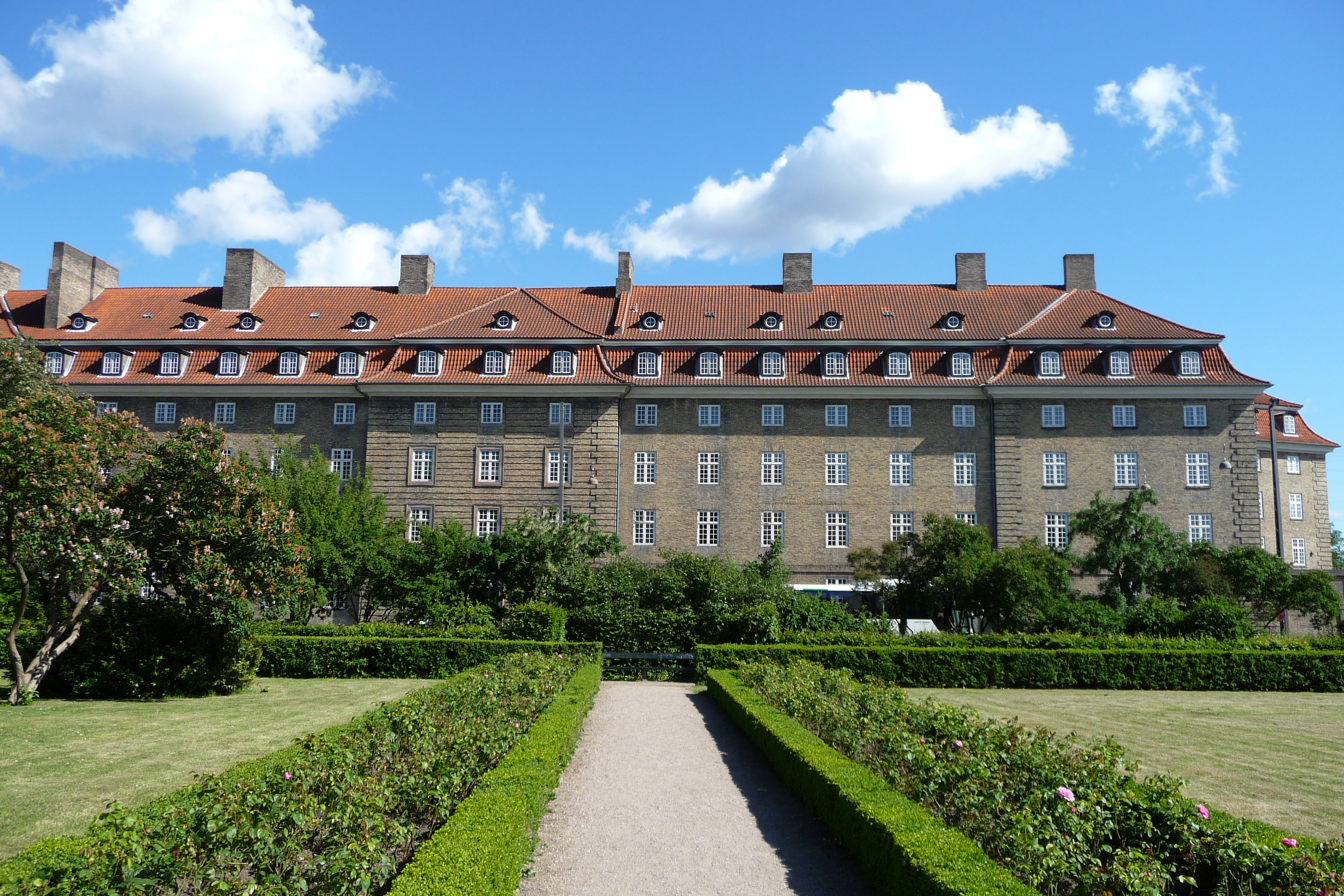
Sølvgade Barracks

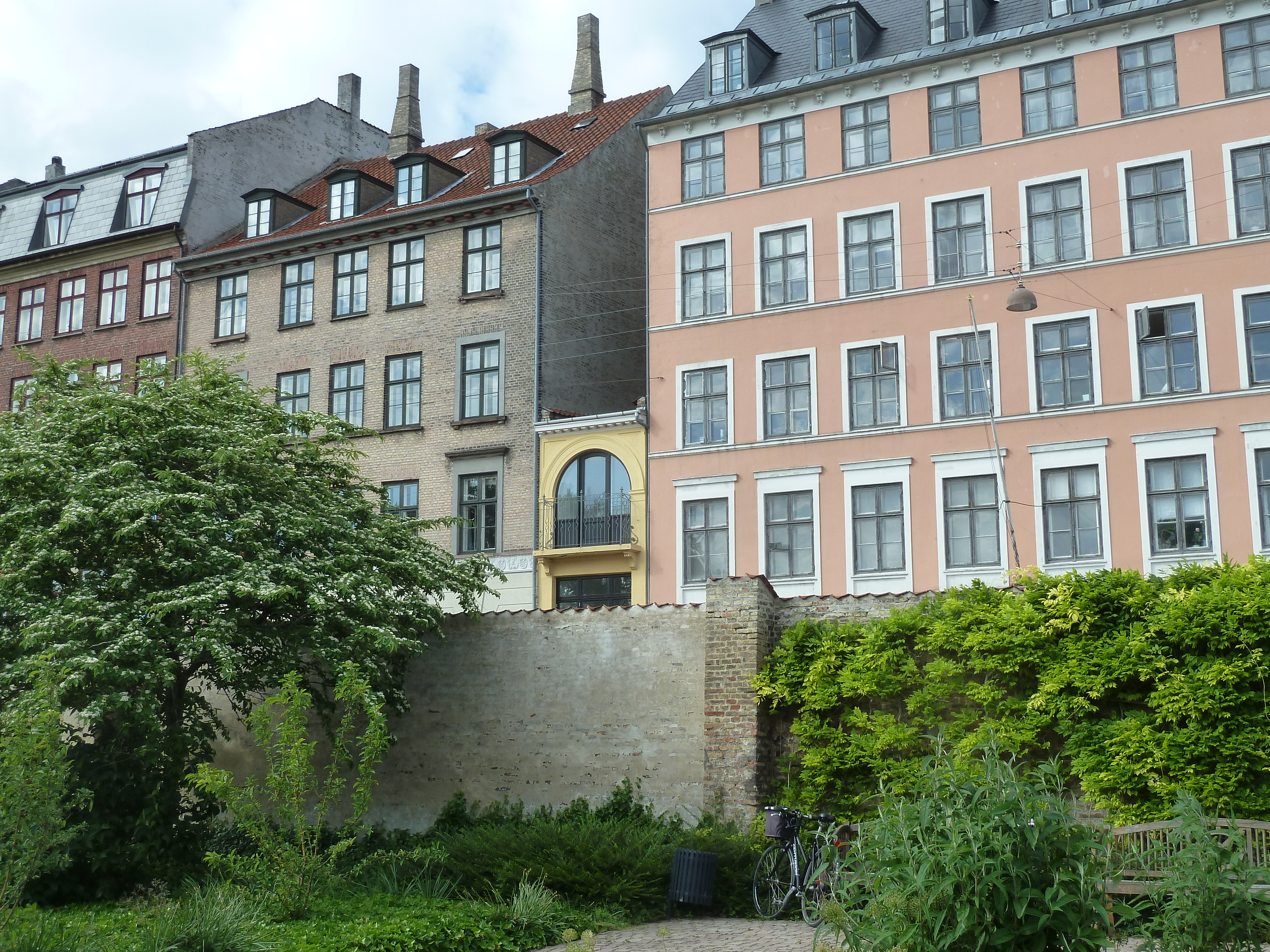
View from Rosenborg Castle Garden

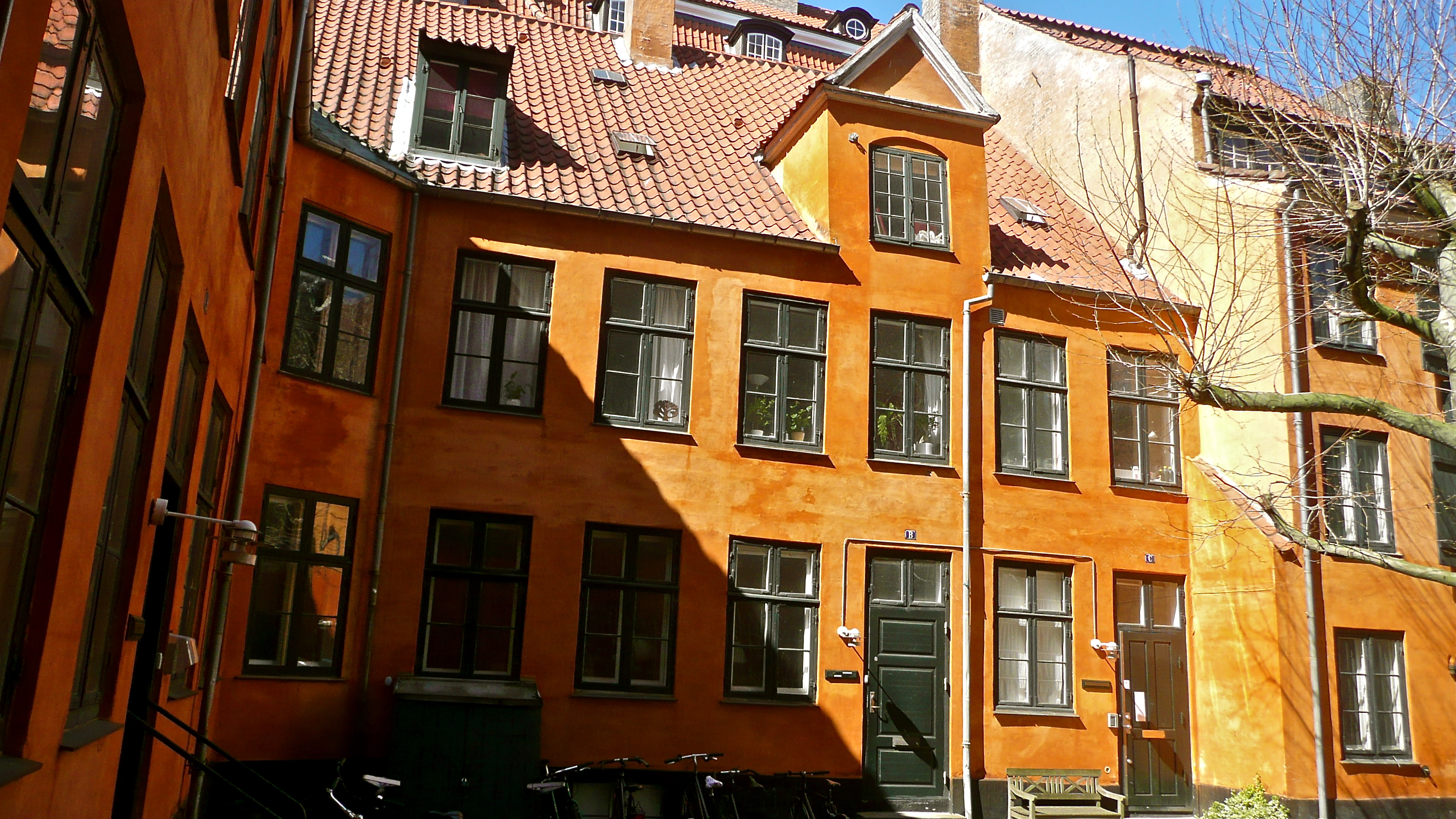
Buildings in a courtyard

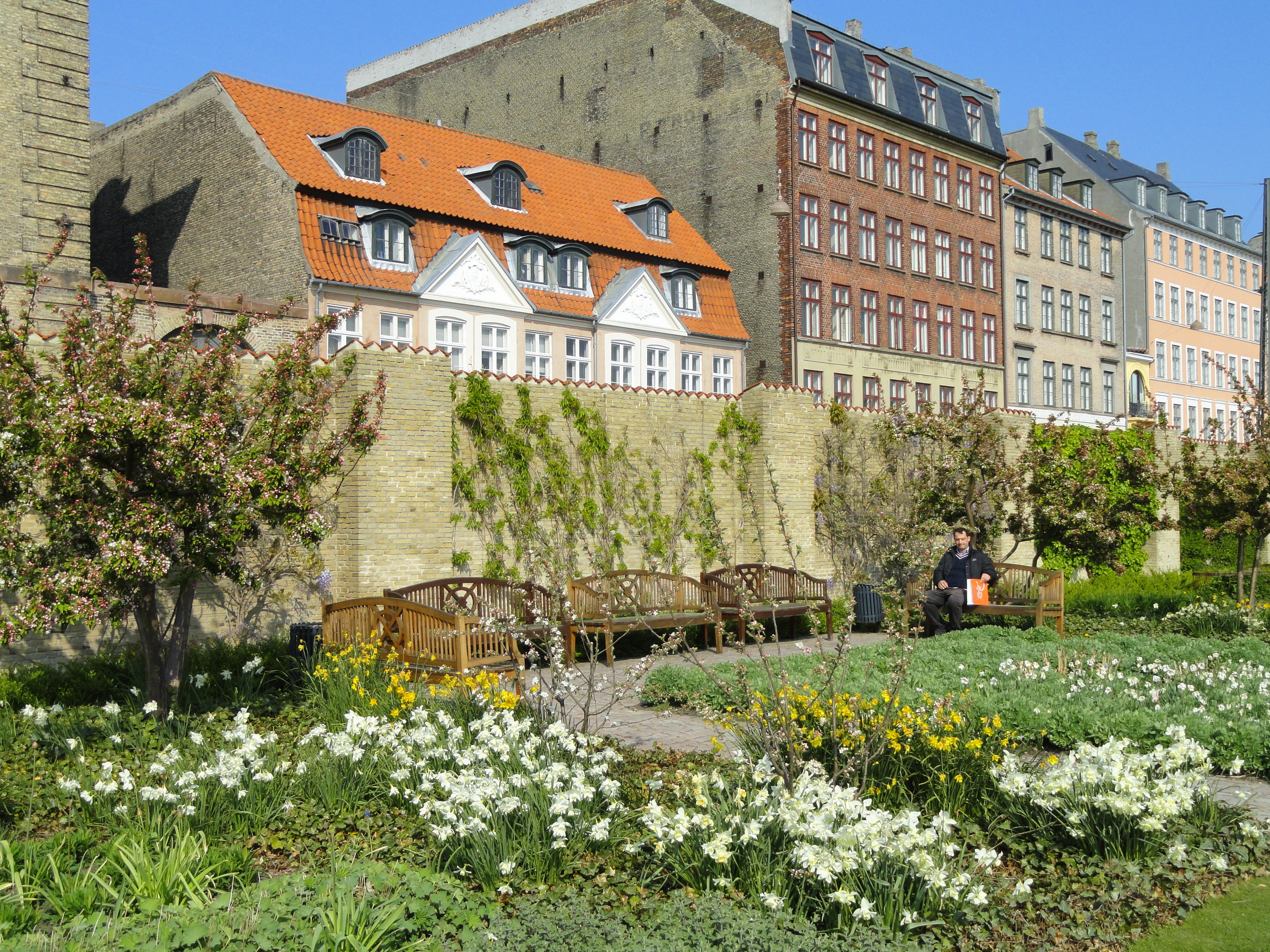
The low Jakob Holmblad House seen to the left

== See also ==
- Sølvgade 20–22
