= Gefion Gymnasium =

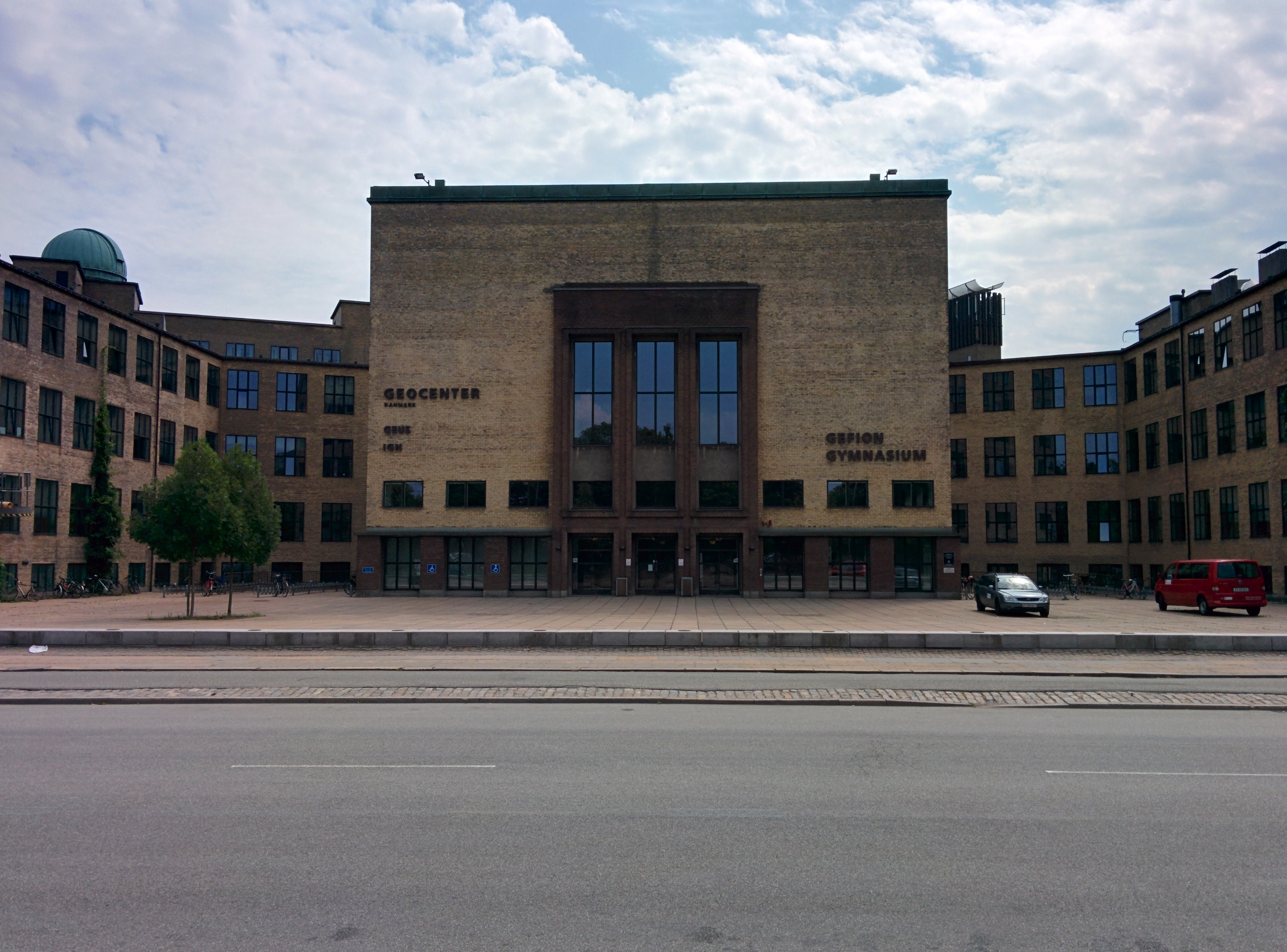

Location
- Copenhagen, Denmark
- Coordinates: 55.6882°N 12.5817°E

Information
- Type: public gymnasium
- Founded: 2010
- Principal: Birgitte Vedersø
- Staff: 120
- Enrollment: 1,100
- Website: http://www.gefion-gym.dk/

Gefion Gymnasium is an upper secondary school (Danish: gymnasium) in Copenhagen, Denmark. It is located on Øster Voldgade in the city centre.

== History ==
Gefion Gymnasium was created in 2010 through the merger of Østre Borgerdyd Gymnasium and the Metropolitan School.

== Building ==
The buildings were originally constructed for the College of Advanced Technologies. The complex was designed by Oluf Gjerløv-Knudsen and constructed between 1929 and 1954. It has a total area of 12,000 square metres. The rear side faces Rigensgade (No. 18) and the northeast side Stokhusgade (Nos. 1–5). Geocenter Danmark, a research centre under the University of Copenhagen, is also based in the buildings.
