= Christians Plejehus =

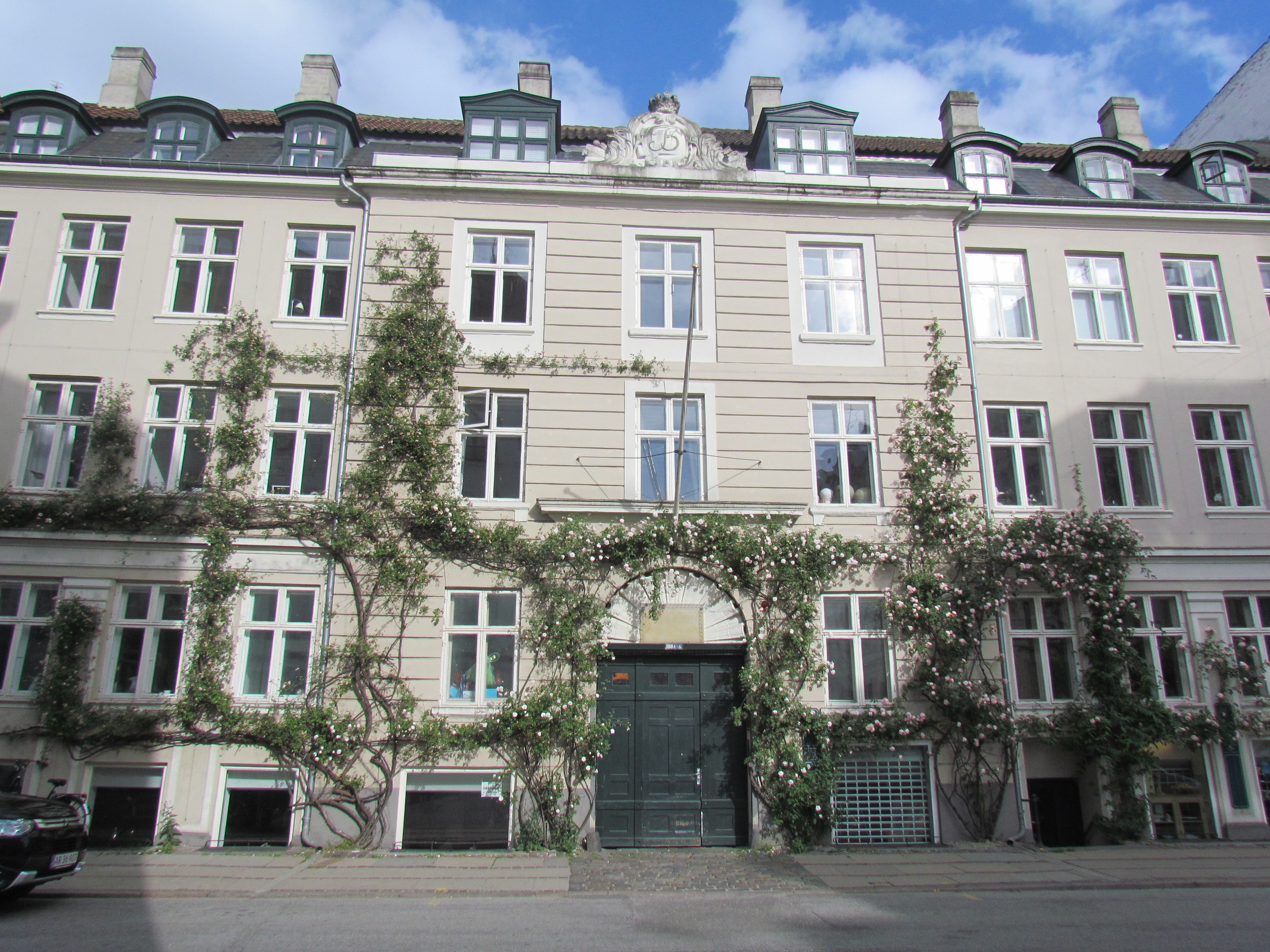
- The facade on Store Kongensgade
- Interactive map of the Christians Plejehus area

General information
- Architectural style: Neoclassical
- Location: Copenhagen, Denmark
- Coordinates: 55°41′12.24″N 12°35′25.76″E
- Construction started: 1767
- Completed: 1769
- Client: Royal Danish Army

Design and construction
- Architect: Christian Carl Pflueg

Christians Plejehus is a former military retirement home for war veterans in Store Kongensgade in Copenhagen, Denmark. The fairly shortlived institution relocated to Sølvgade Barracks in 1776. The complex was subsequently used as a new home for the Royal Orphanage until a new building in Randersgade was inaugurated in 1880, The building complex in Store Kongensgade was listed on the Danish registry of protected buildings and places in 1918. It surrounds two consecutive courtyards.

== History ==
=== Site history, 1689–1760 ===
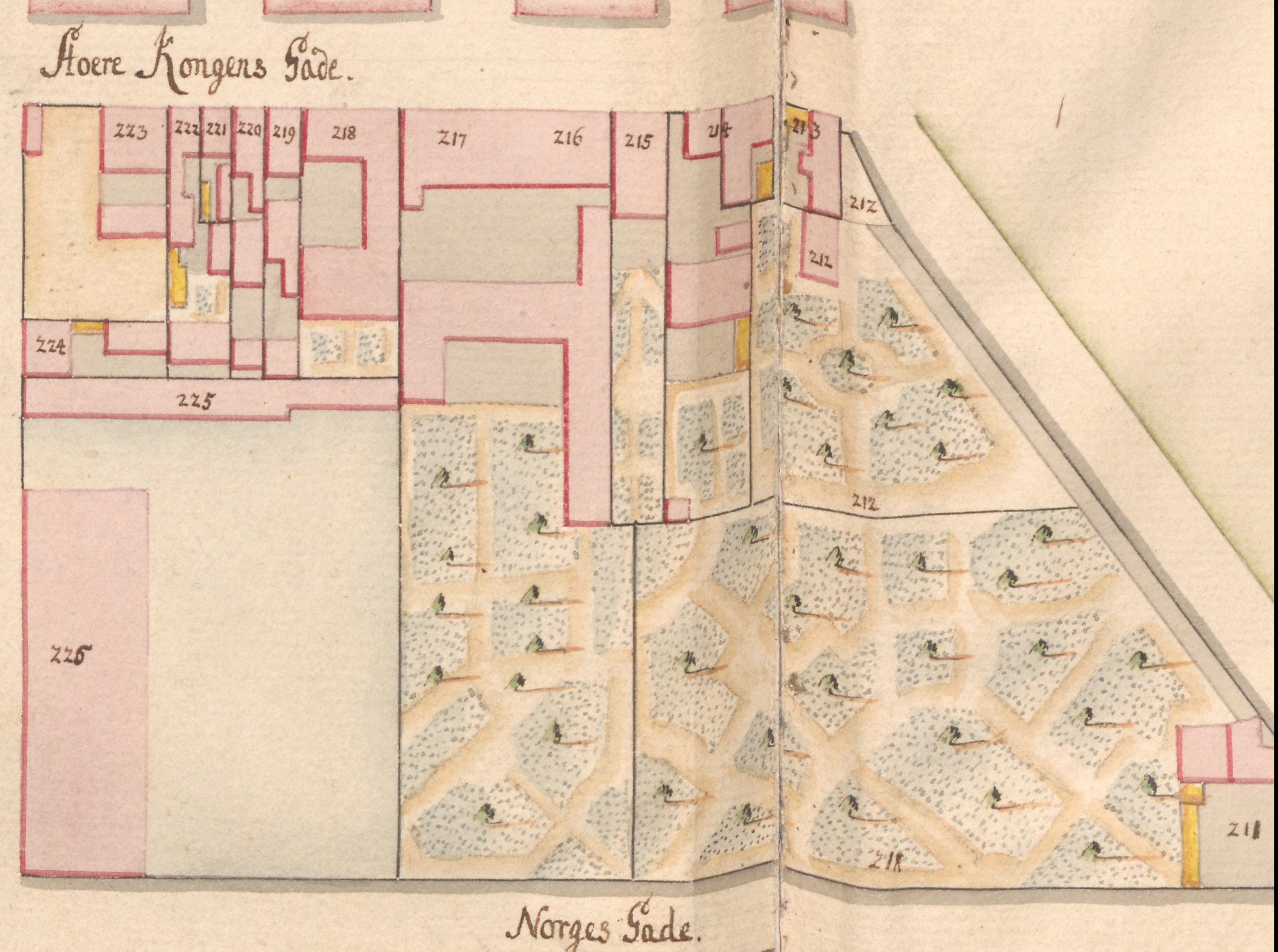
No. 216/217 seen on a detail from Christian Gedde's map of St. Ann's Rast Quarter, 1757.

The site is located in the area known as New Copenhagen, or St. Ann's Quarter, which was created when Copenhagen's East Rampart was given a more northernly course in the 1649s. A large property on the site was listed in Copenhagen's first cadastre of 1689 as No. 115 in St. Ann's East Quarter, owned by one hofråd Hass. It was later divided into smaller properties. The property on the site was listed in the new cadastre of 1756 as No. 216/217, owned by kommerceråd Gilles Vilhelm Dahm.

=== Christian Carl Pflueg and Christians Plejehus ===
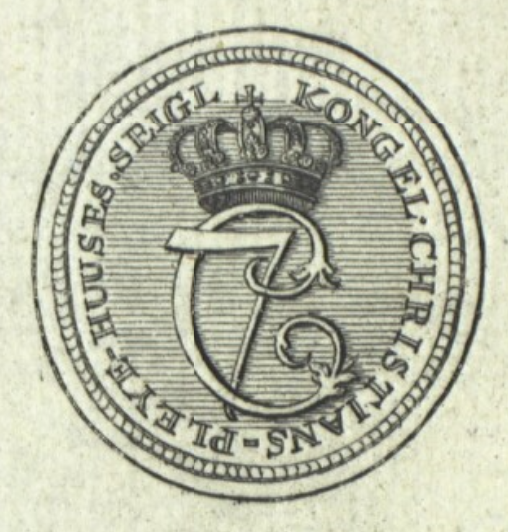
Seal from Christians Plejehus

In the early 1760s, Christian Carl Pflueg. an officer in the engineering troops, proposed an improvement of the conditions in the home for war veterans at Ladegården. In 1764, the fieldmarshal-general assigned him as an assistant to the director of the institution. The following year he left the engineering troops to assume a position as director of a new institution which was given the name Christians Plejehjem after Christian VII. Kammerråd Gilles Vilhelm Faenen's former factory site in Store Kongensgade was chosen as the location of the new institution and Plejehus designed the buildings which were completed in 1769. The complex contained a linen weaving mill operated by the residents using yarn made by soldier wives and daughters. Other crafts were also practiced in the facility. The complex was originally intended for 300 residents but was home to 500 by 1772 approximately half of which were children.

In 1775, Christians Plejehus was moved to Sølvgade Barracks together with Almindelig Hospital and Pflueg was placed under supervision of a director general since his administration was deemed to costly. The move had, however, disturbed the operations of the weaving mill and deteriorated the institution economy even further. In 1782, Pflueg was fired without pension and Christians Plejehus moved to Eckernførde in Schleswig-Holstein in 1785.

=== The Royal Orphanage, 1776–1880 ===
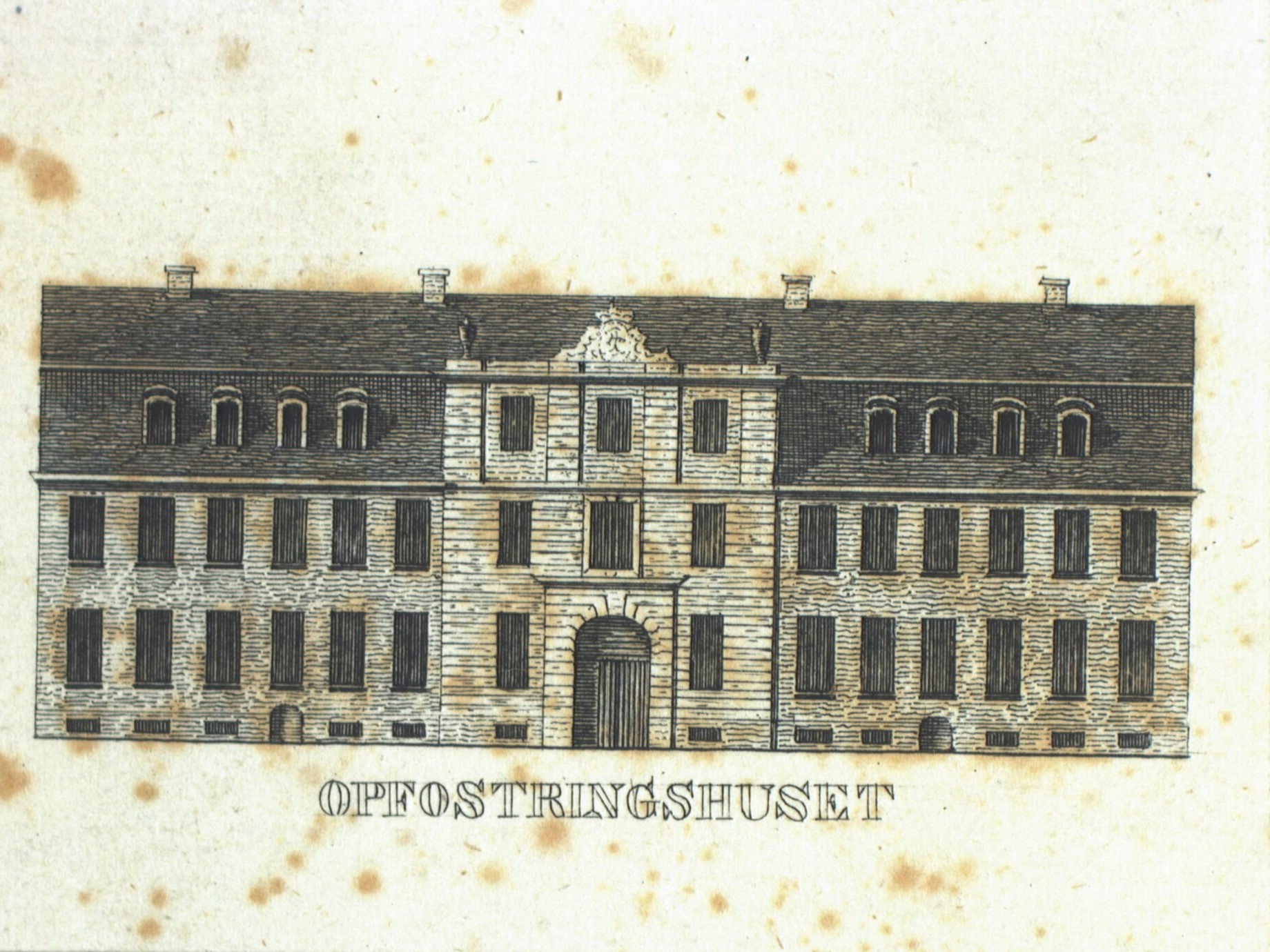
Opfostringshuset, 1932

When Christians Plejehus moved to Sølvgade in 1776, its old buildings in Store Kongensgade were taken over by the Royal Orphanage. The property was listed in the new cadastre of 1806 as No. 269 in St. Ann's East Quarter.

The Royal Orphanagewas based in the complex until 1880 when a new building in Randersgade in Østerbro was inaugurated in 1880.

=== Later history ===
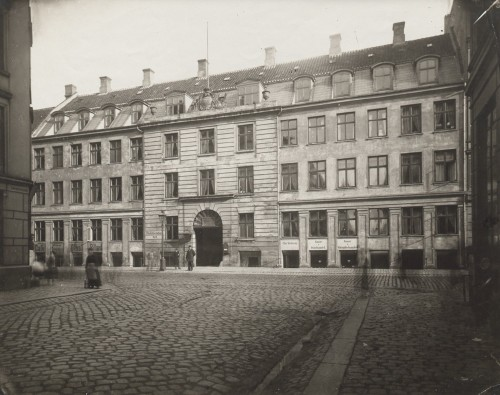
The building in the late 19th century

The Salvation Army rented the chapel from 1886 until 1948 and became home to several house share collectives in the 1960s. It has later been converted into a housing cooperative. The buildings were renovated in 2009.

== Building ==
The building is 15 bays long has a median risalit with rustication and the ground floor is decorated with 10 lesenes. Above the gate is a two-bay wall dormer and a coat of arms Frederick V's monogram and. The gate opens to two consecutive courtyards. The wing separating the two courtyards from each other contains the chapel.

== Today ==
The complex contains a mixture of apartments and offices.

== Gallery ==
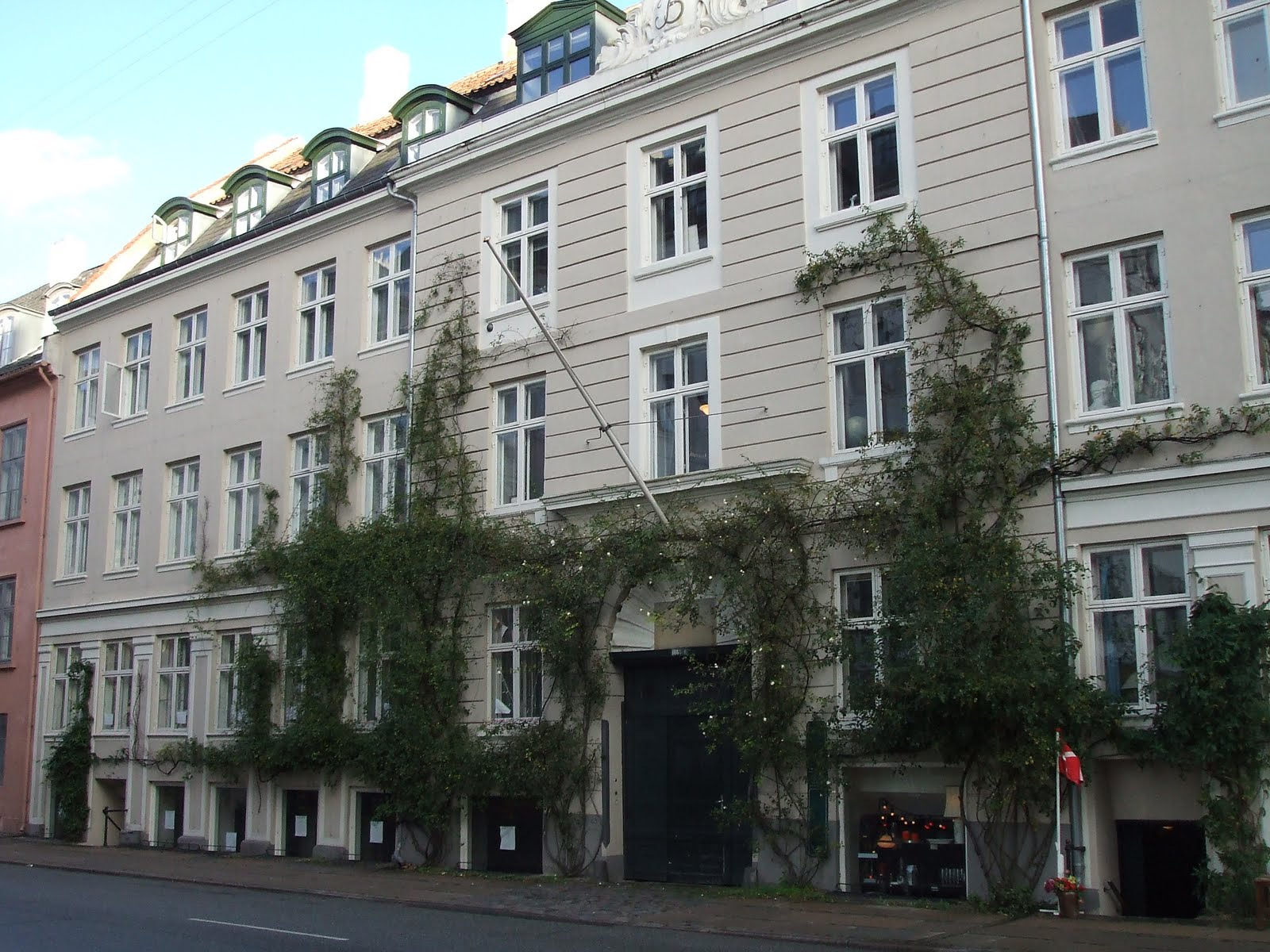
The front wing.

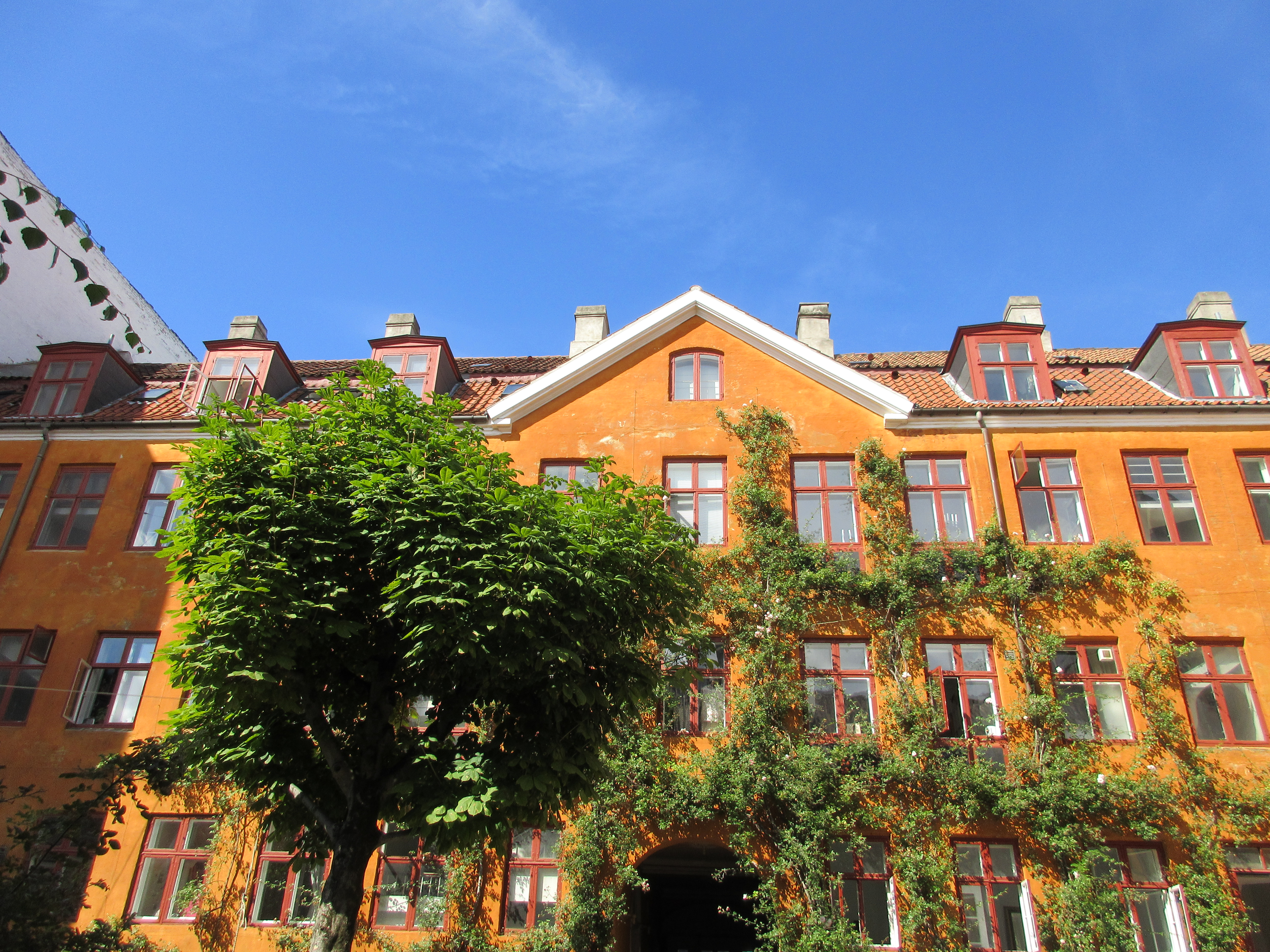
The front wing viewed from the courtyard.

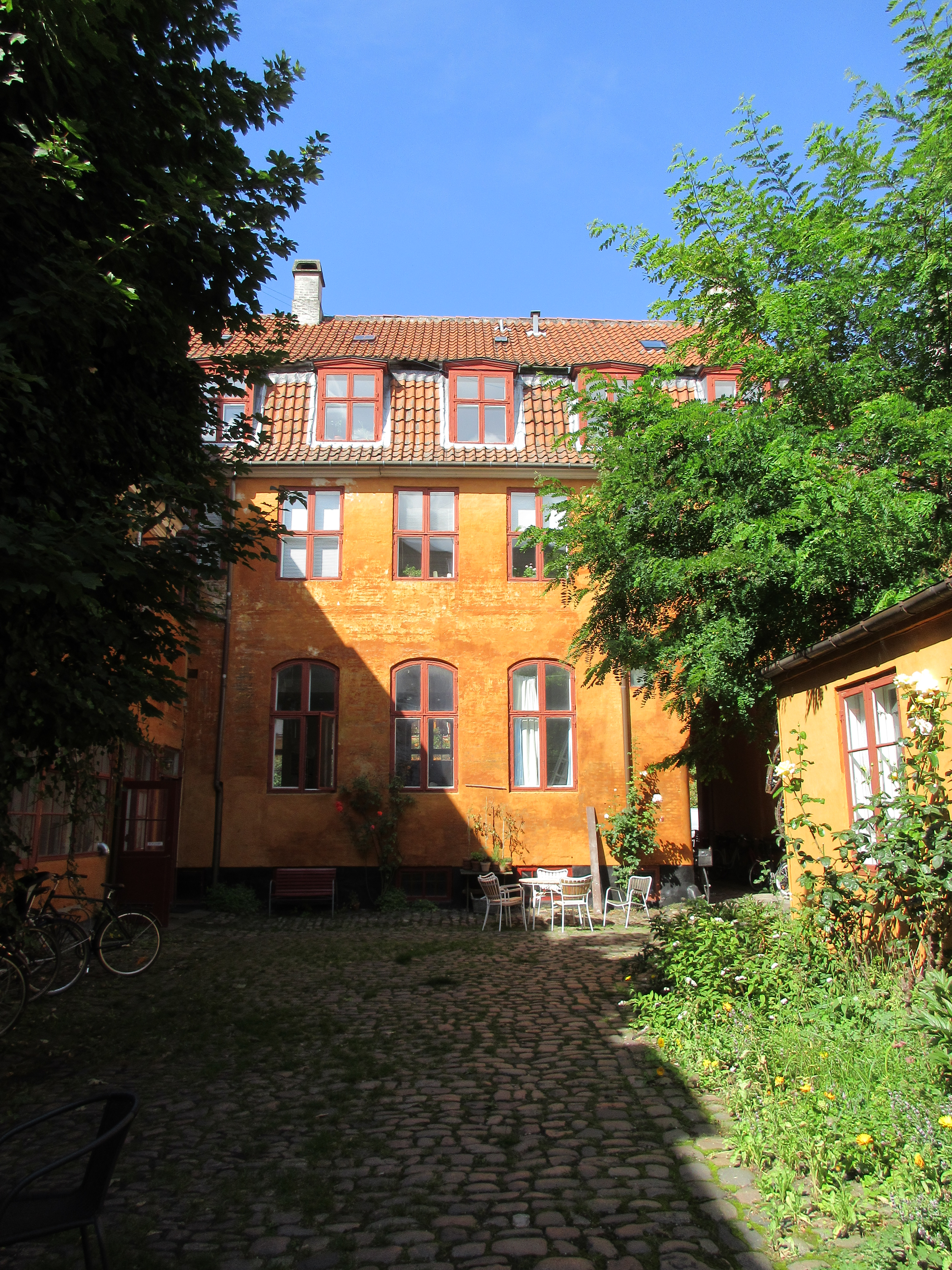
One of the two courtyards.

== See also ==
- Kvæsthusgade
