= Øster Voldgade =

Street in Copenhagen, Denmark

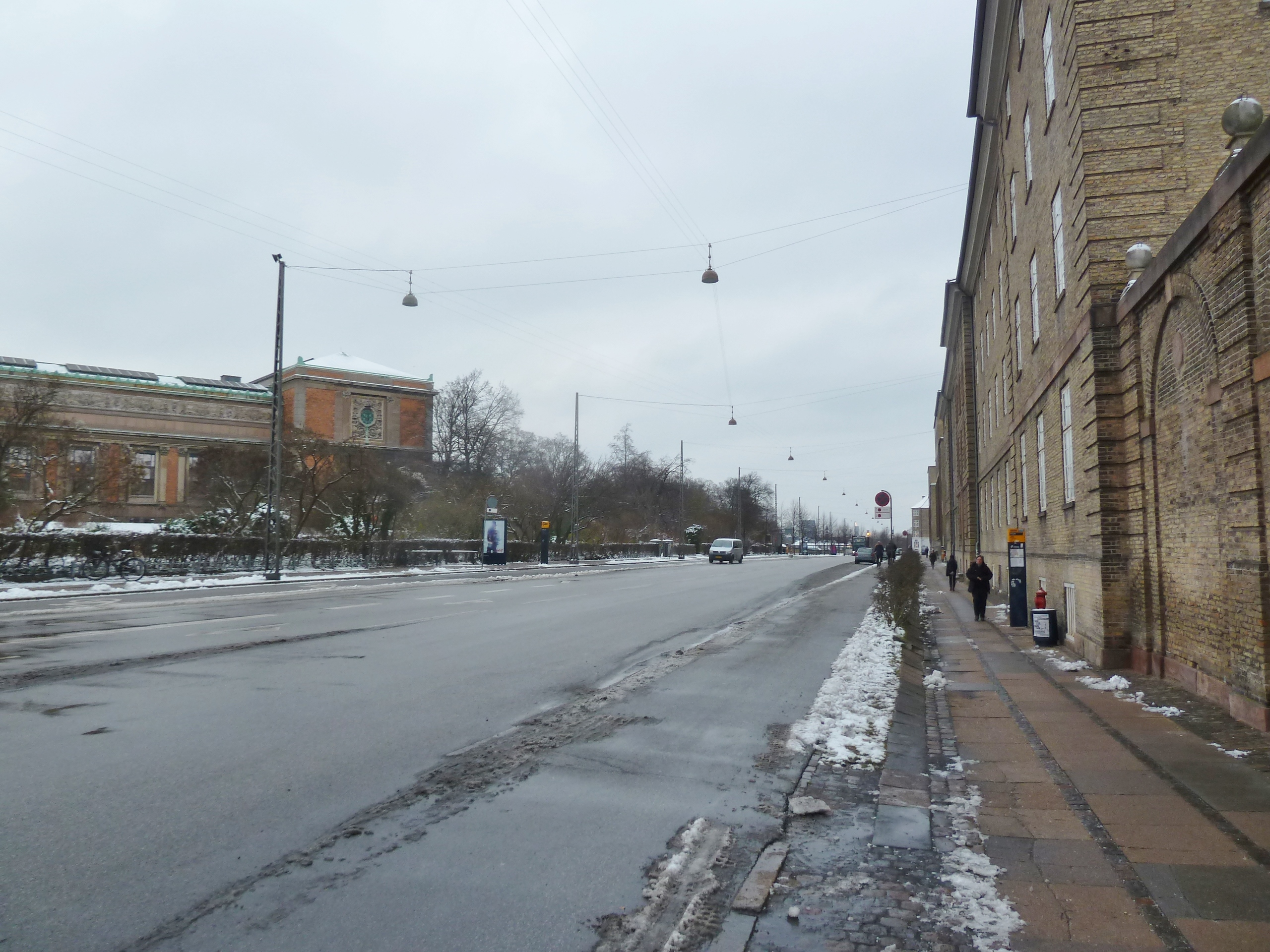
- Øster Voldgade
- Interactive map of Øster Voldgade
- Length: 1,219 m (3,999 ft)
- Location: Copenhagen, Denmark
- Quarter: City centre
- Nearest metro station: Nørreåprt (west), Østerport (east)
- Coordinates: 55°41′12.12″N 12°34′36.84″E
- Southwest end: Gothersgade
- Northeast end: Oslo Plads

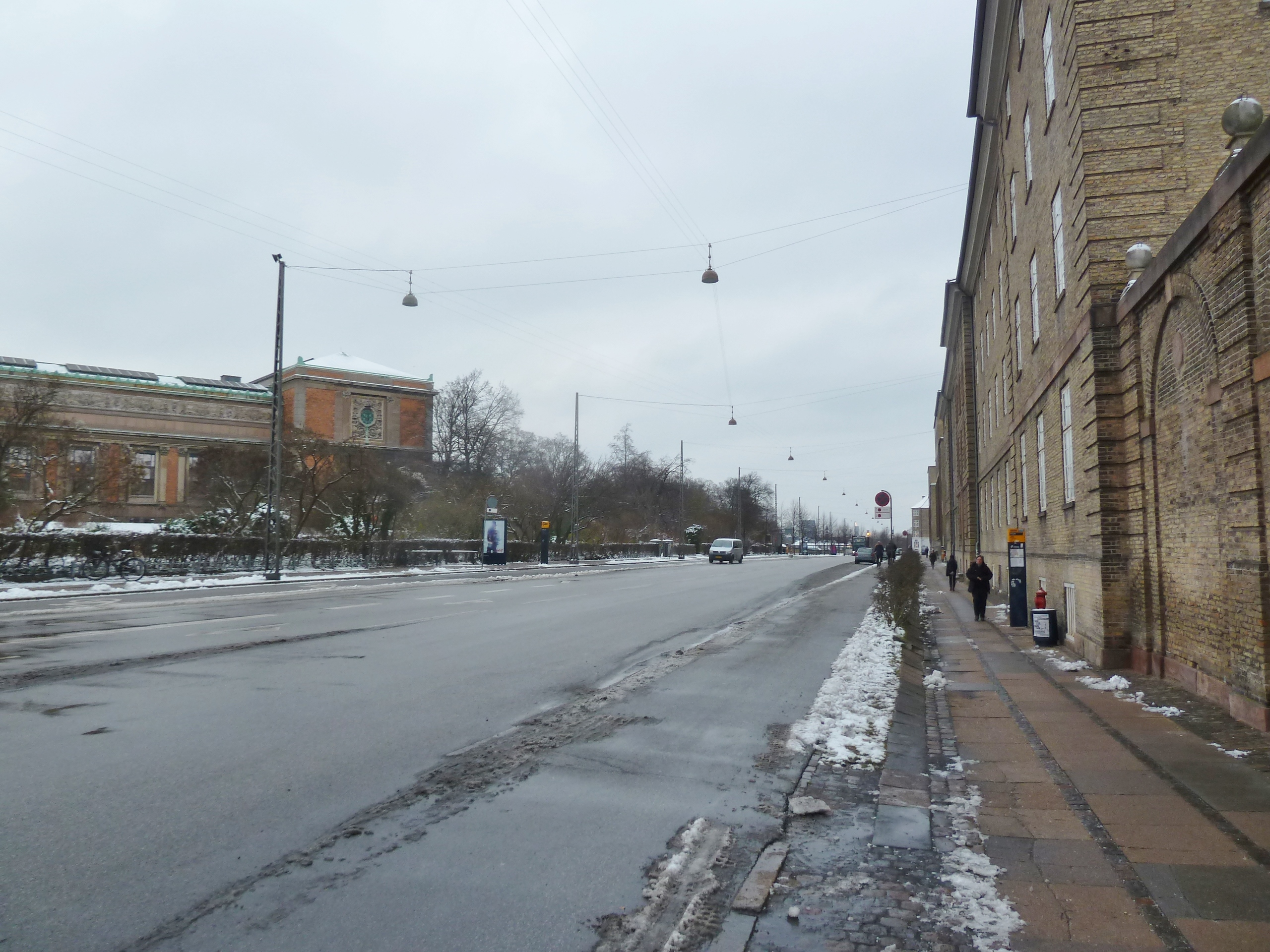
Øster Voldgade seen from Georg Brandes Plads towards Østerport Station.

Øster Voldgade (lit. "East Rampart Street"), together with Vester Voldgade and Nørre Voldgade, forms a succession of large streets which arches around the central and oldest part of the Zealand side of Copenhagen, Denmark. It runs north-east from Gothersgade at Nørreport Station to Georg Brandes Plads, between the Copenhagen Botanical Gardens and Rosenborg Castle Gardens, and continues straight to a large junction at the southern end of Oslo Plads, near Østerport Station, where it turns into Folke Bernadotte Allé.

== History ==
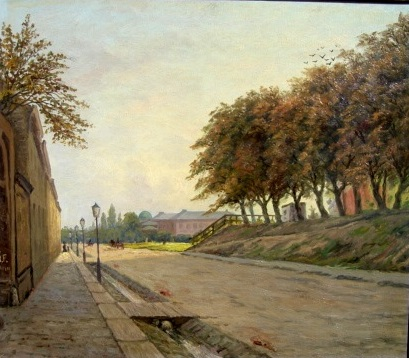
Øster Voldgade in 1888

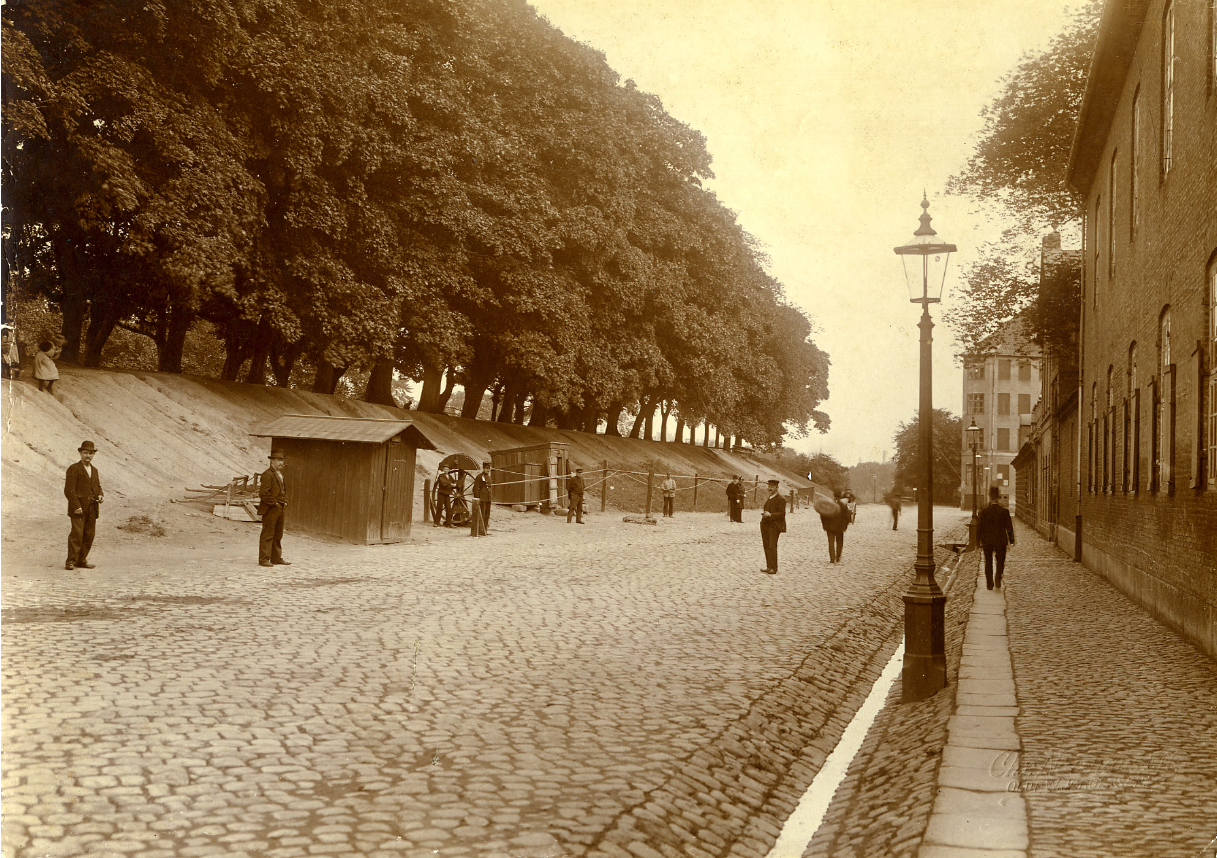
Øster Voldgade, c. 1890

Øster Voldgade was originally a smaller street which ran on the inside of the new East Rampart, built in the 1650s to replace the old East Rampart which followed present day Gothersgade. The alley was expanded when the ramparts were removed in the 1850s.

== Notable buildings and residents ==
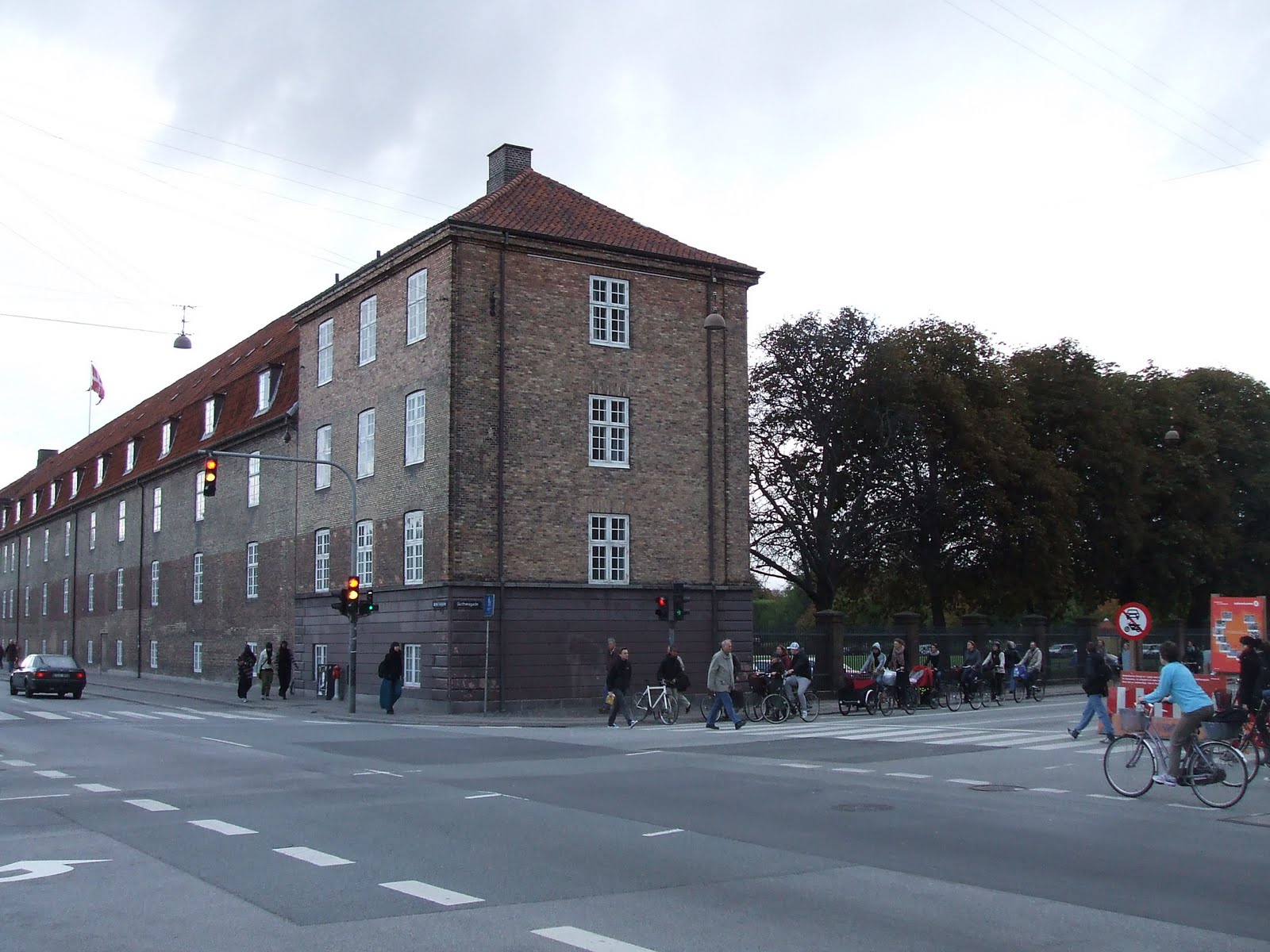
Rosenborg Barracks

The long, Neoclassical building on the corner of Øster Voldgade and Gothersgade, opposite the entrance to Copenhagen Botanical Gardens, is Rosenborg Barracks. The building was designed by Johan Cornelius Krieger and completed in 1786. It contains a small museum dedicated to the Royal Life Guards.

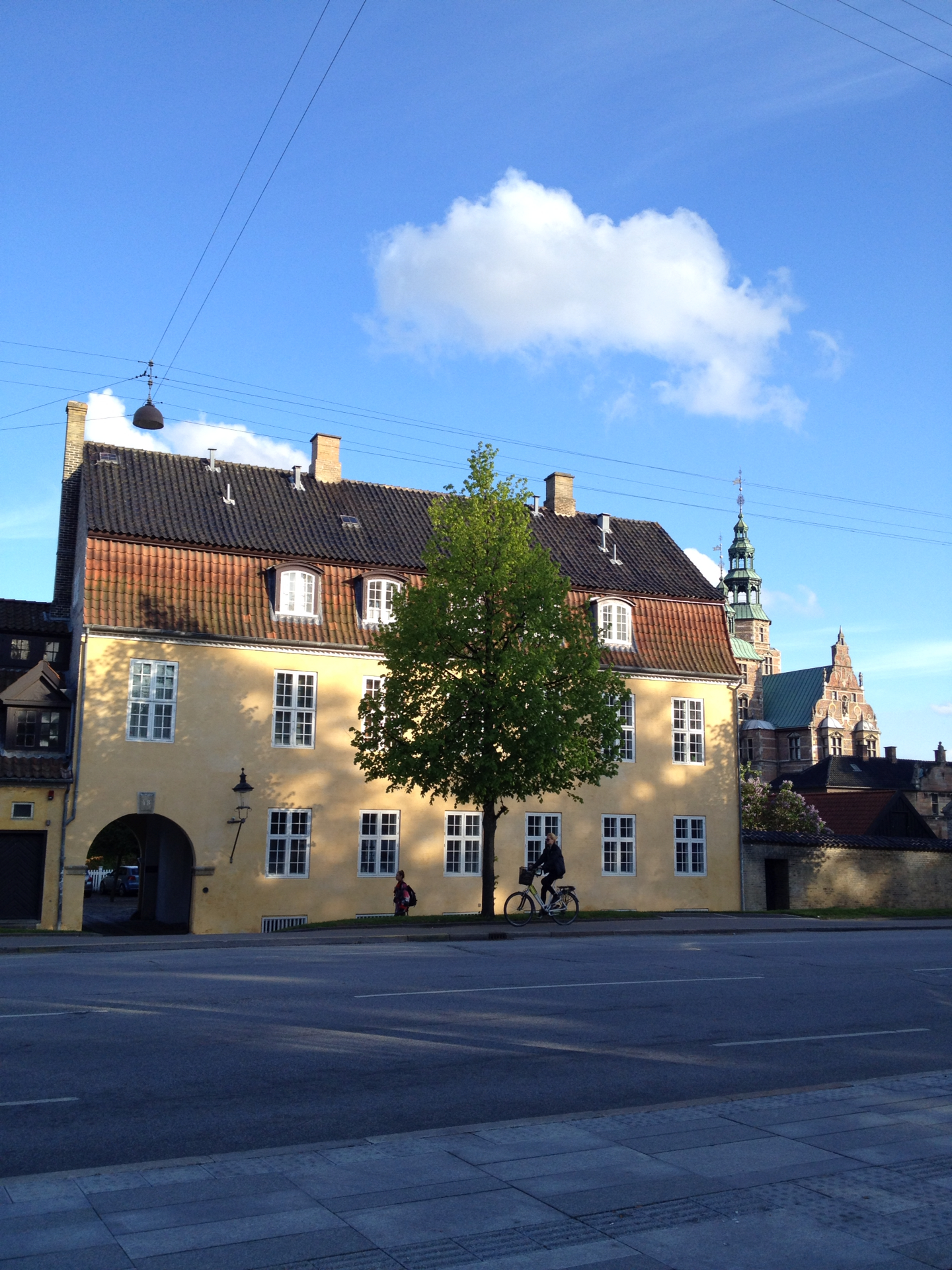
Slotsforvalterboligen

Next to Rosenborg Barracks is the main entrance to Rosenborg Castle (Øster Voldgade 4a). On the other side of the gate is Slotsforvalterboligen (No. 4b). It was built in 1688 and extended with an extra story in 1777. The gateway affords access to Rosenborg Castle Gardens. The Gartner's House is attached to Slotsforvalterboligen. It was built around the same time

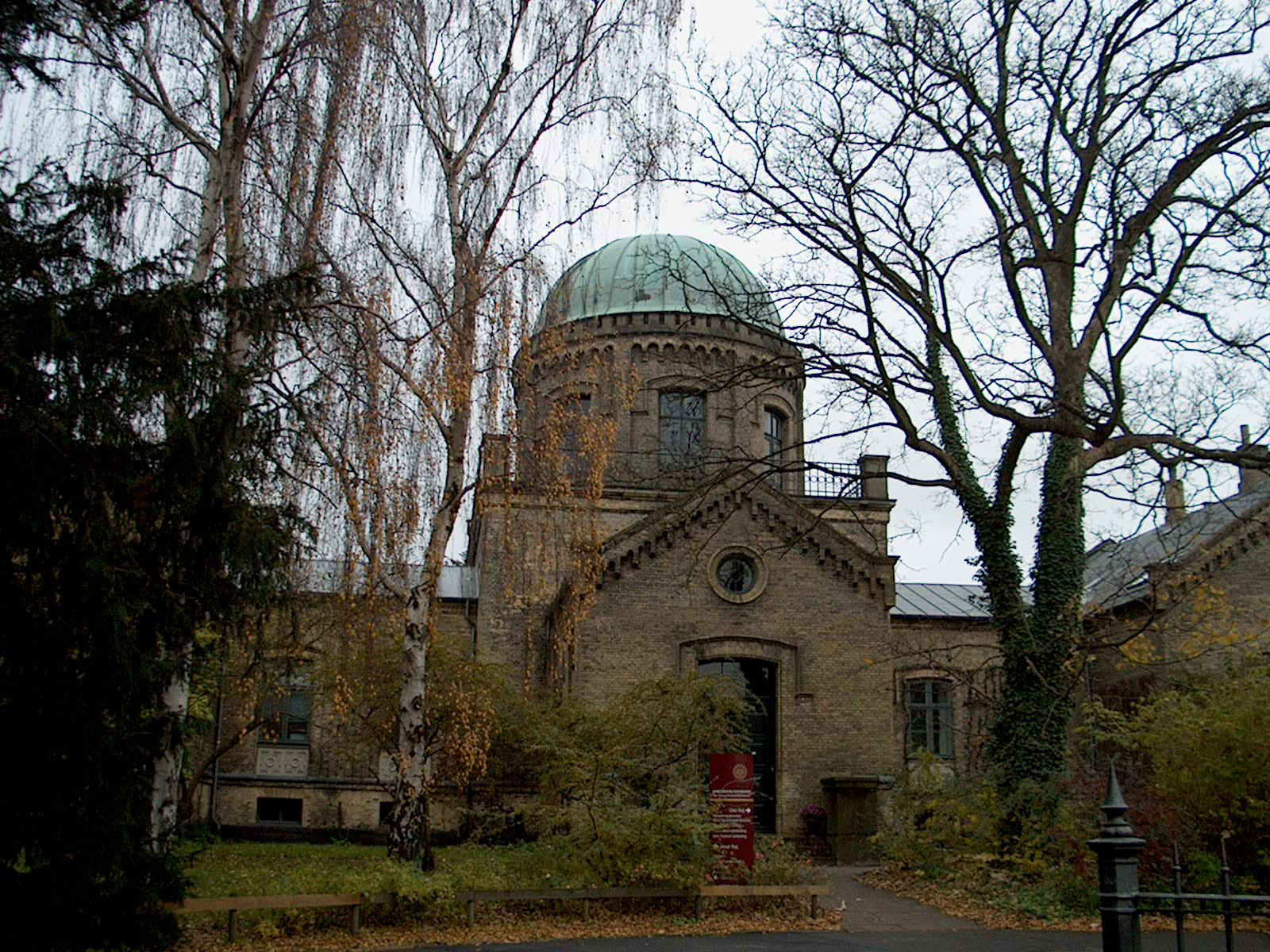
Østervild Observatory

On the opposite side of Øster Voldgade, perched on top of the former Rosen-borg Rosenborg Bastion, hidden from the street by tall trees, is the former Østervold Observatory. It was built as a replacement for the astronomical observatory at the Round Tower to designs by Christian Hansen and now contains an interpretive centre associated with the Botanical Gardens. The Museum of Geology is located on the corner of Øster Voldgade and Sølvgade.

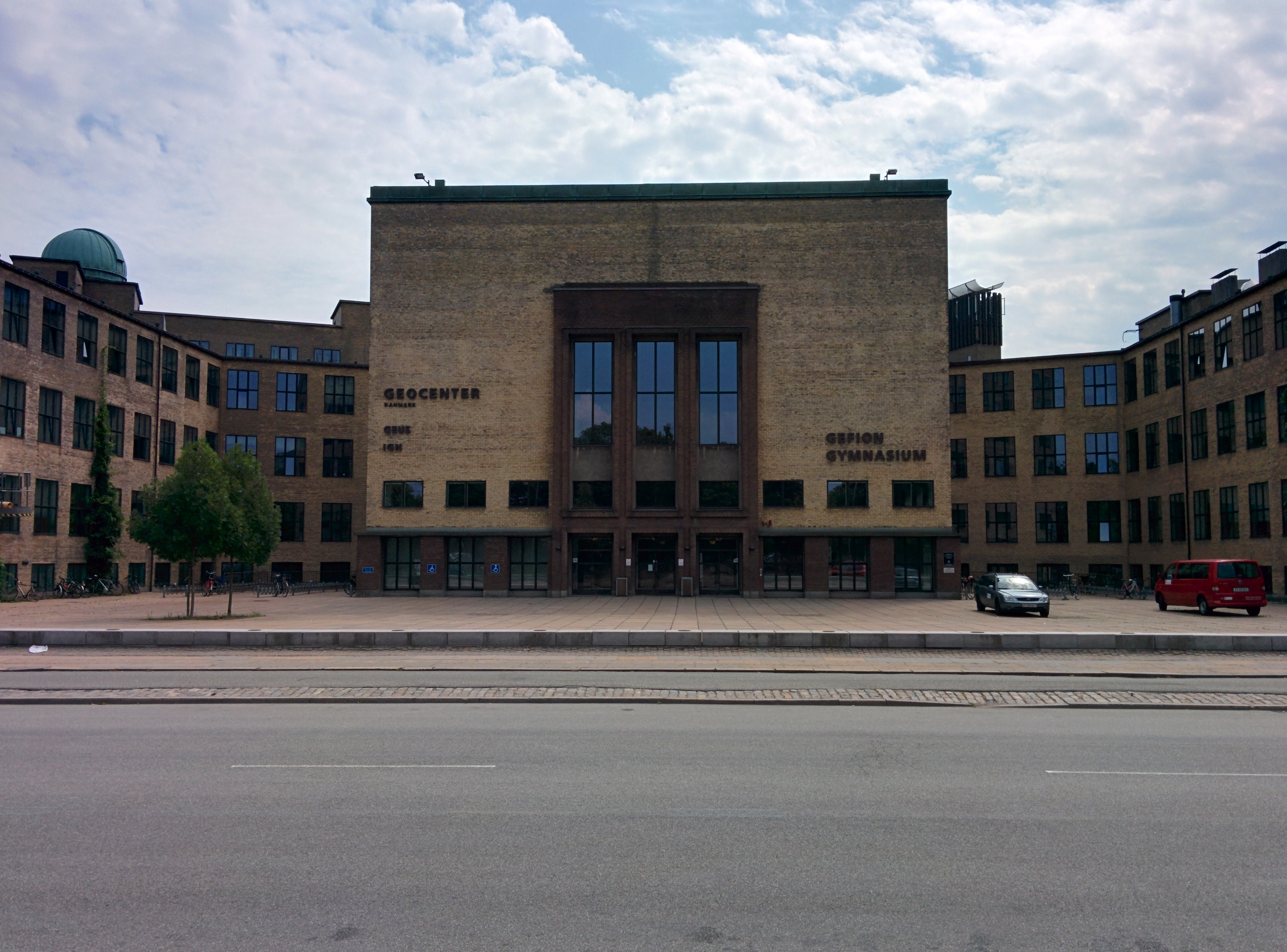
Gefion Gymnasium

On the two opposite corner on the other side of Sølvgade are the main entrance of the Danish National Gallery and the former Sølvgade Barracks. Both buildings have their address on Sølvgade. The large, modern complex at Øster Voldgade 10 was originally built between 1929 and 1954 for the College of Advanced Technology, now DTU. It now houses the upper secondary school Gefion Gymnasium and Geocenter Danmark, a research centre under University of Copenhagen.

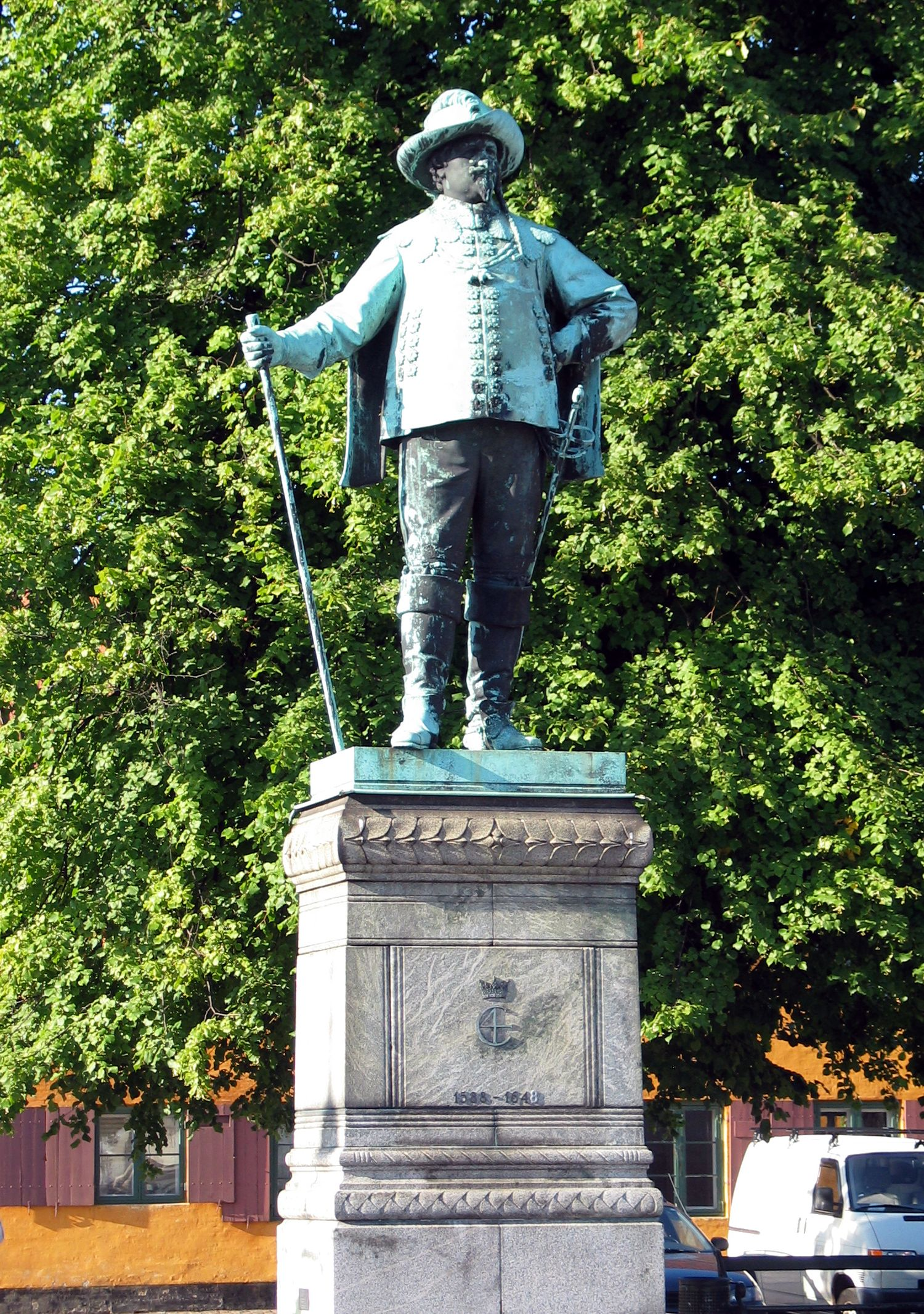
Christian IV statue in front of Nyboder

Østervold Kollegium (No. 20) is a hall of residence. The last section of the street passes the Nyboder development which was founded by Christian IV to provide housing for personnel of the Royal Danish Navy. Opposite Nyboderis School (No. 15), a primary school built in 1918–1920 in response to the booming number of children in Nyboder.

== Christian IV statue ==
In front of Nybodr stands a bronze statue of Christian IV. It was created by Vilhelm Bissen and installed in 1900.
