= Ernst Peymann =

Danish army officer

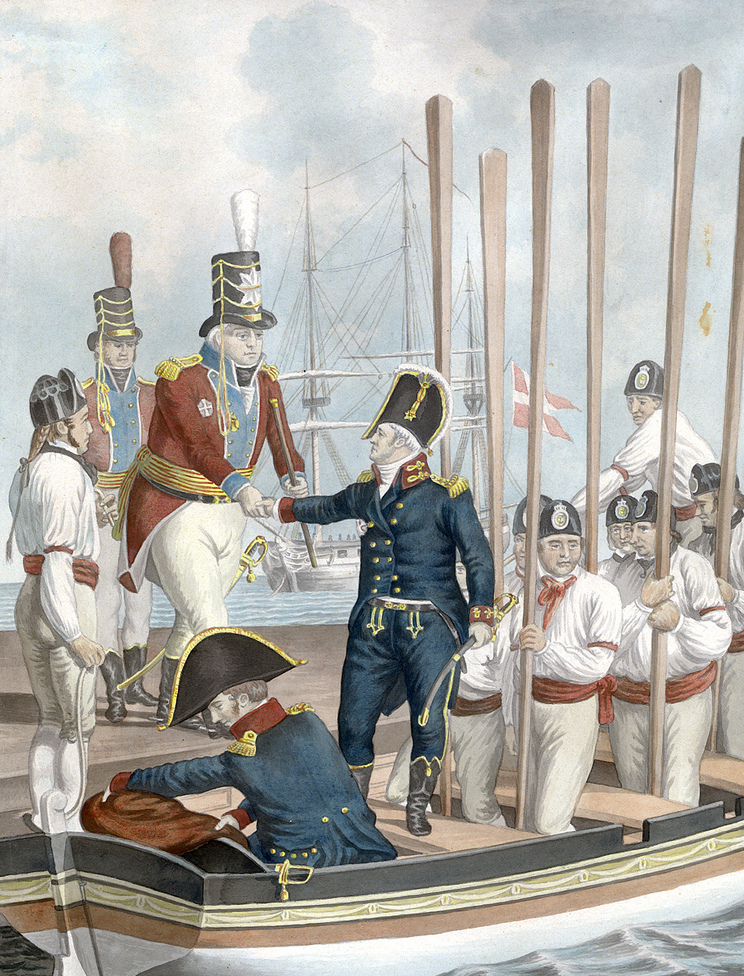
- Peymann (center left) saying his goodbye to Vice-admiral Steen Bille on 17 August 1807 during the Battle of Copenhagen
- Born: 22 May 1737; Rotenburg, Bremen-Verden
- Died: 28 January 1823 (aged 85); Rendsburg, Duchy of Holstein
- Military career
- Allegiance: Denmark–Norway
- Branch: Royal Danish Army
- Service years: c. 1755-1807
- Rank: Major-General
- Conflicts: Seven Years' War; Napoleonic Wars; Battle of Copenhagen (1807)

Major-General Hinrich Ernst Peymann (22 May 1737 – 28 January 1823) was a Danish Army officer and fortifications engineer who served in the French Revolutionary and Napoleonic Wars. He commanded Danish forces during the Battle of Copenhagen in 1807, and led subsequent negotiations after their capitulation.

== Career ==
=== Early career ===
Peymann entered the military engineering service in 1755, working on fortifications near Holstein. He was attached to the French Royal Army for a few years and participated in the Seven Years' War, before returning to Denmark to serve as the Quartermaster general of fortifications in 1783. In this capacity he was considered a reliable architect; he constructed a lighthouse, barracks for the Royal Life Guards, and two warehouses in the 1780s, among other buildings. Peymann also served on numerous government construction committees, and worked with officers from the Royal Danish Navy to construct coastal defense structures. In 1789 he became a Colonel in the infantry, and in 1795 a Major general. Later that year he would also become the commissioner of the Copenhagen Fire Brigade, a position he would hold for a decade. He resigned from the engineering branch a year later.

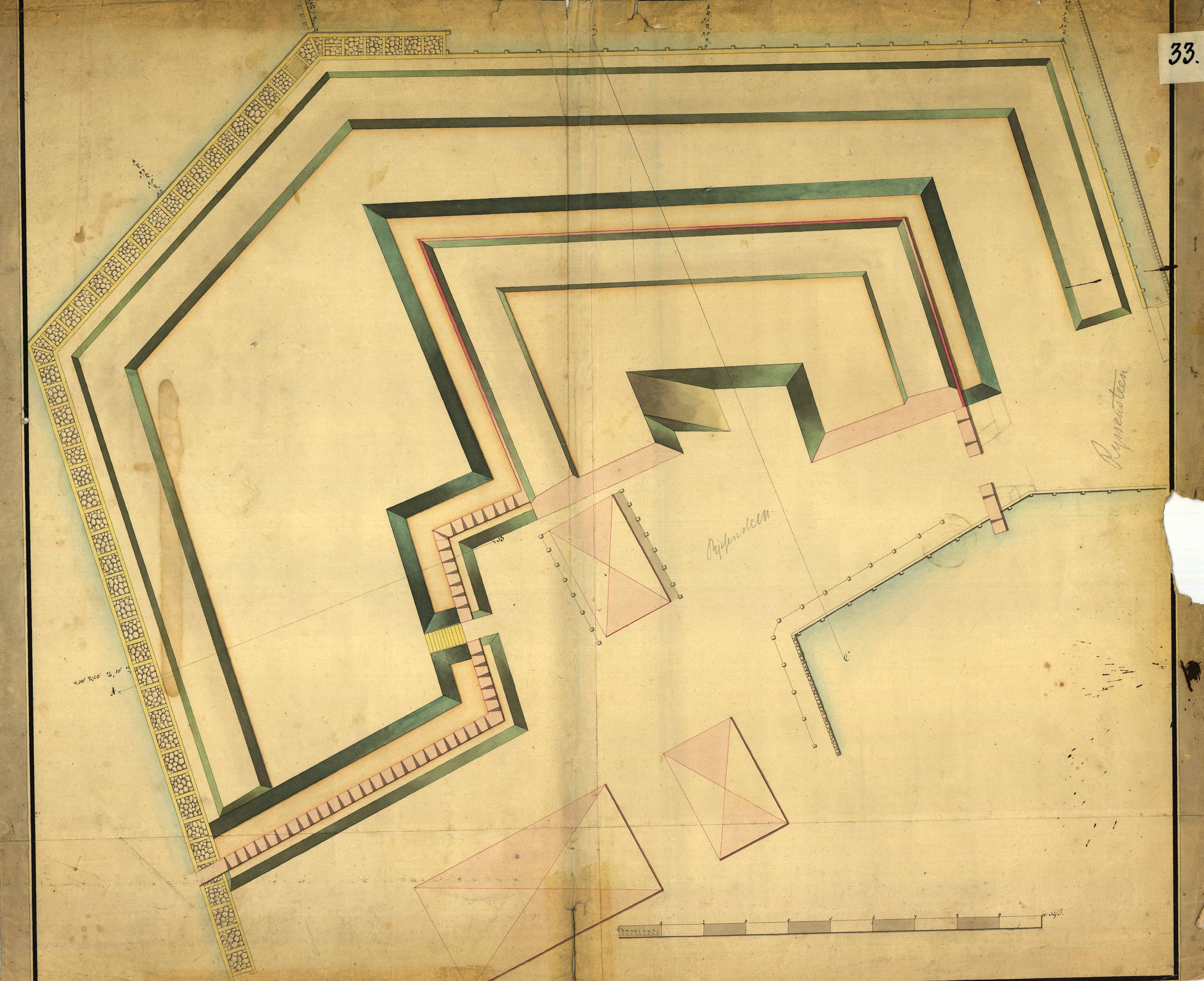
Drawing of 'fortress Copenhagen' done by Peymann in 1778

=== Battle of Copenhagen ===
Peymann was described as a 'friendly and sociable man,' and had no combat experience. He was not originally intended to lead the defense at Copenhagen, yet after the illness of the previous Zealandic commander, he was assigned the position in May 1807. He had at his disposal around 12,000 troops — a combined force of unseasoned regular infantry and militia — and slightly neglected city fortifications. Due to communication errors he was unaware of the British landing at Vedbæk on August 16, and soon found his city completely surrounded. As per his orders he refused to surrender on September 1, yet not even a week later he conceded. Initially hopeful because of the 1801 Battle of Copenhagen, which Peymann viewed as a Danish victory, local officials soon decided that fighting would be too costly, and pressured Peymann into peace. Because of this perceived disobedience, the Crown Prince and war commission demoted him, seized his land, and took away his pension. The punishment would be brief, as after the war it was revised to grant Peymann a pension and a regular discharge.
