= Vodroffsvej 2 =

Listed building in Copenhagen, Denmark

Vodroffsvej 2A–B
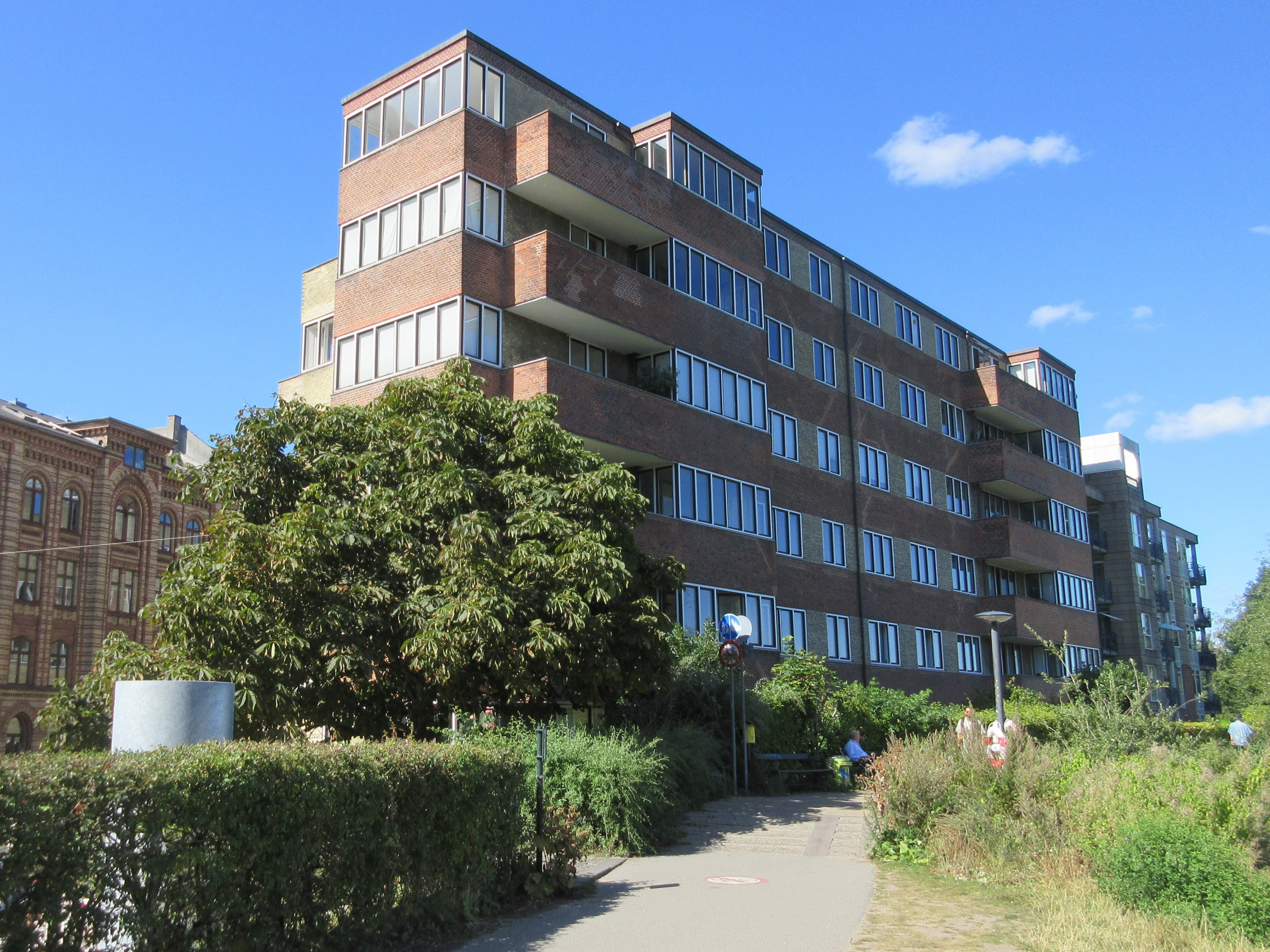
- Interactive map of the Vodroffsvej 2A–B area

General information
- Architectural style: Functionalism
- Location: Copenhagen, Denmark
- Coordinates: 55°40′27.37″N 12°33′18.72″E
- Construction started: 1929
- Completed: 1930

Design and construction
- Architects: Kay Fisker and C. F. Møller

Vodroffsvej 2, situated at the southwestern corner of St. Jørgen's Lake, on the corner of Vodroffsvej and Gammel Kongevej in Frederiksberg, is the earliest example of a Functionalist apartment building in Copenhagen, Denmark. Built in 1929–30, its design is the first manifestation of a long-standing colleboration between the architects Kay Fisker and C. F. Møller. The building was listed on the Danish register of protected buildings and places in 1994.

== History ==
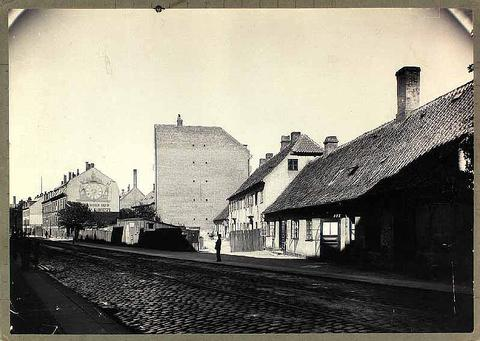
Vodroffs Nyhuse

A row of low houses known as Vodroffs Nyhuse (Vodroff's New Houses) were formerly located on the site. They were constructed in 1846 and demolished in 1928.

The narrow and restricted site was acquired by the buisinessman Harald Simonsen. He charged the architects Kay Fisker and C. F. Møller with the design of a mixed-use building for the site. The new building was constructed in 1929–30 It contained 18 rental apartments and seven shops. Being the first Modernist apartment building in Copenhagen (Arne Jacobsen had constructed a Modernist villa for his own use on Gotfred Rodes Vej in Charlottenlund in 1928), its design created quite a stir in the public debate. The building was colloquially known as "The Layer-Cake House" (Danish: Lagkagehuset), with a reference to traditional Danish layer cakes (Danish: Lagkage), due to the distinct alternating layers of yellow and red brick. Later, when the name Lagkagehuset became more commonly associated with another building, on Christianshavns Torv in Christianshavn, it became known as "The Flat Iron" because of its narrow, triangular shape. A few years after its completion, in 1932. Fisker and Møller completed another building on a narrow, triangular site, between Rosenørns Allé and Aaboulevarden, just a few hundred metres further north, this time with a bow-shaped corner. The 300 metre long Vestersøhus (1935) on the other side of St. Jørgen's Lake was also designed by them.

The building was listed on the Danish register of protected buildings and places in 1994.

== Architecture ==
The building consists of two wings that meet in an acute-angled corner towards Gammel Kongevej. The wing facing the lake, with the most attractive view, has six floors, while the one facing Vodroffsvej holds five in respect of the buildings on the other side of the street. A perpendicular, secondary wing that projects from the rear side of the eastern (lake-side) wing closes the triangular block in the north. Another secondary wing divides the central space of the block into two small light wells. The apartments facing the lake are set up half a level from those facing the street because the lakeside path runs on higher ground on a man-made embankment.

The alternating bands of yellow and red brick, long runs of windows, projecting window bays, cut-back corners and corner windows are all typical features of Nordic Functionalism.

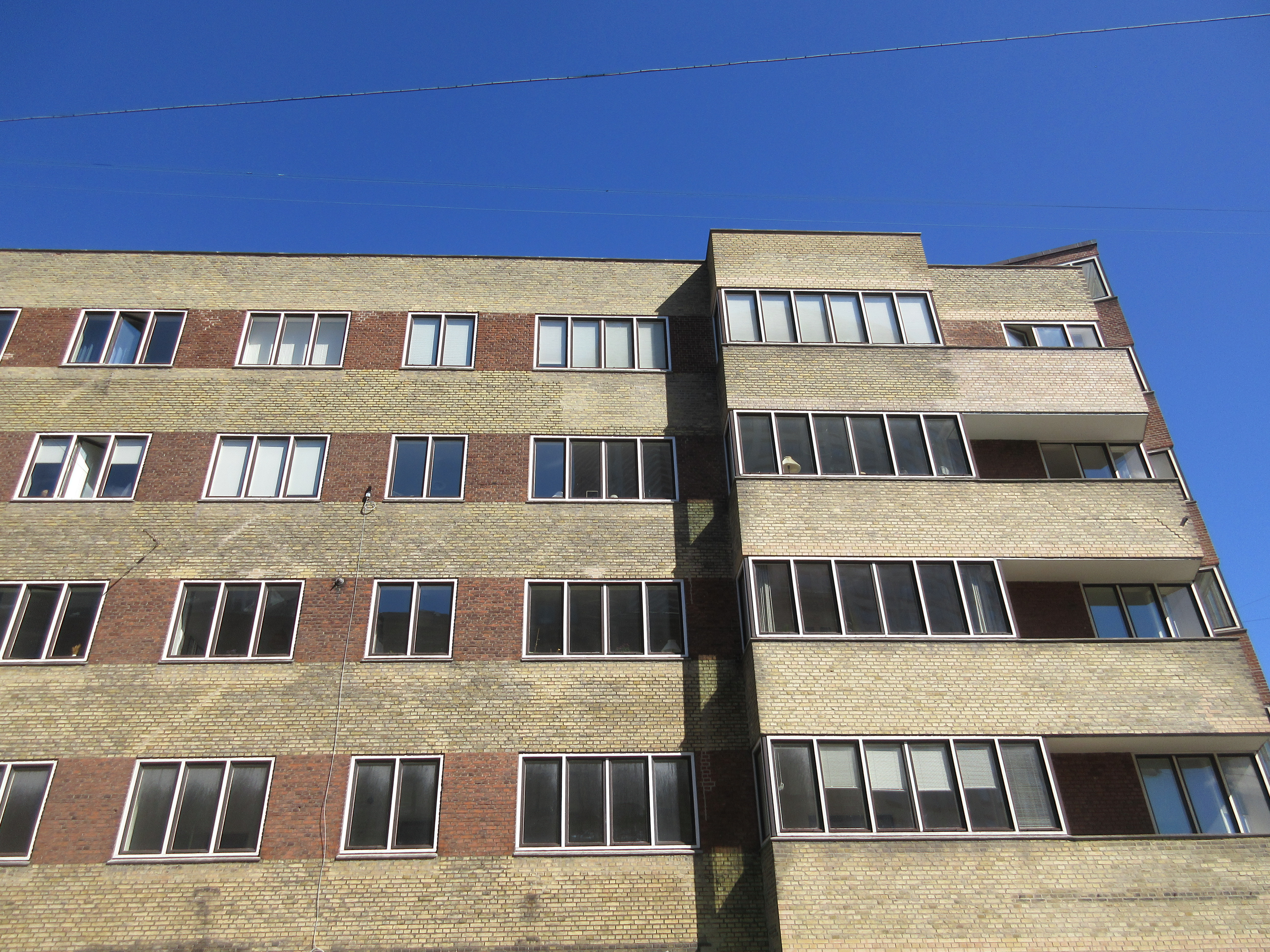
Facade towards the street.

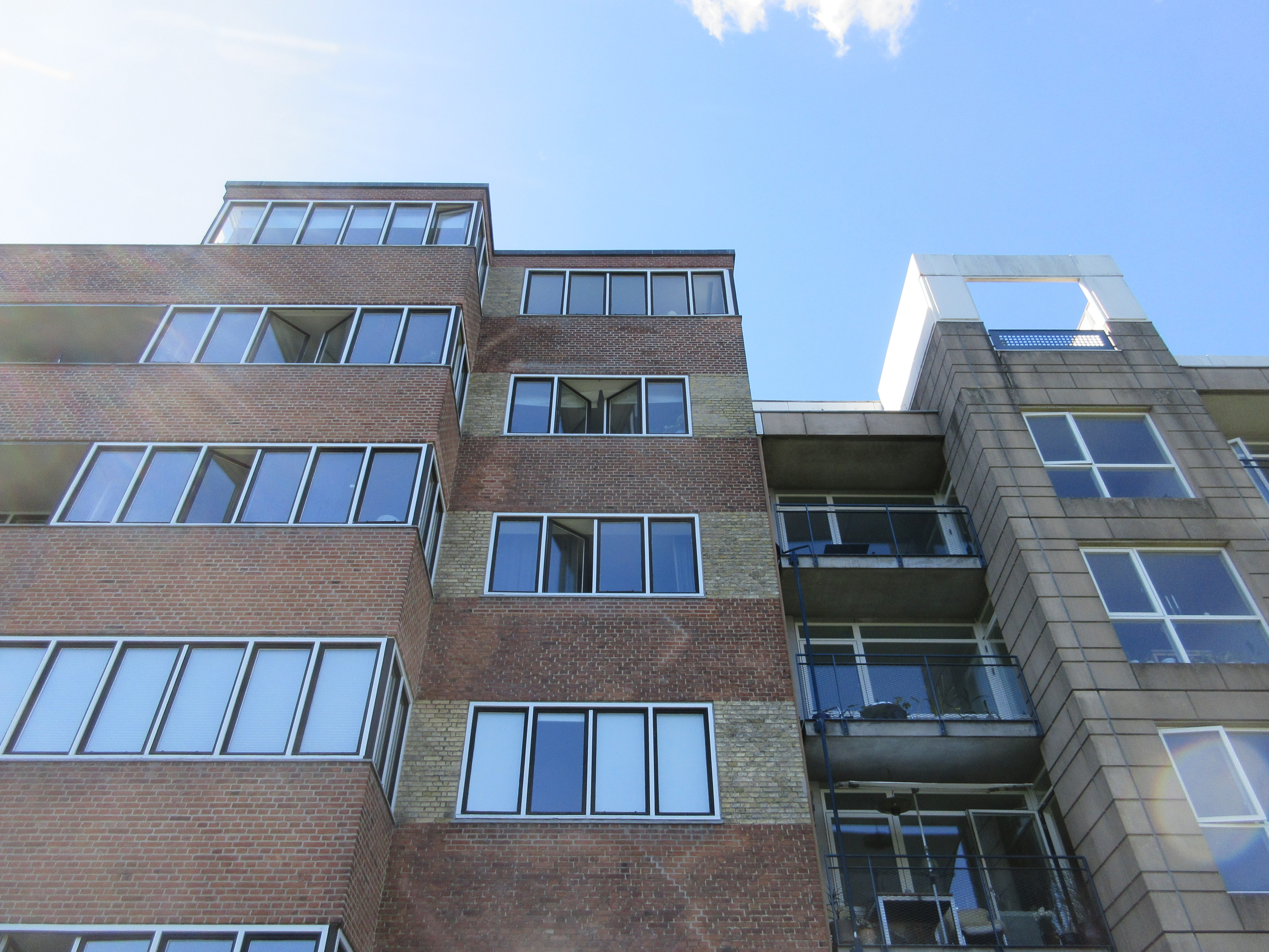
Facade towards the St. Jørgen's Lake.

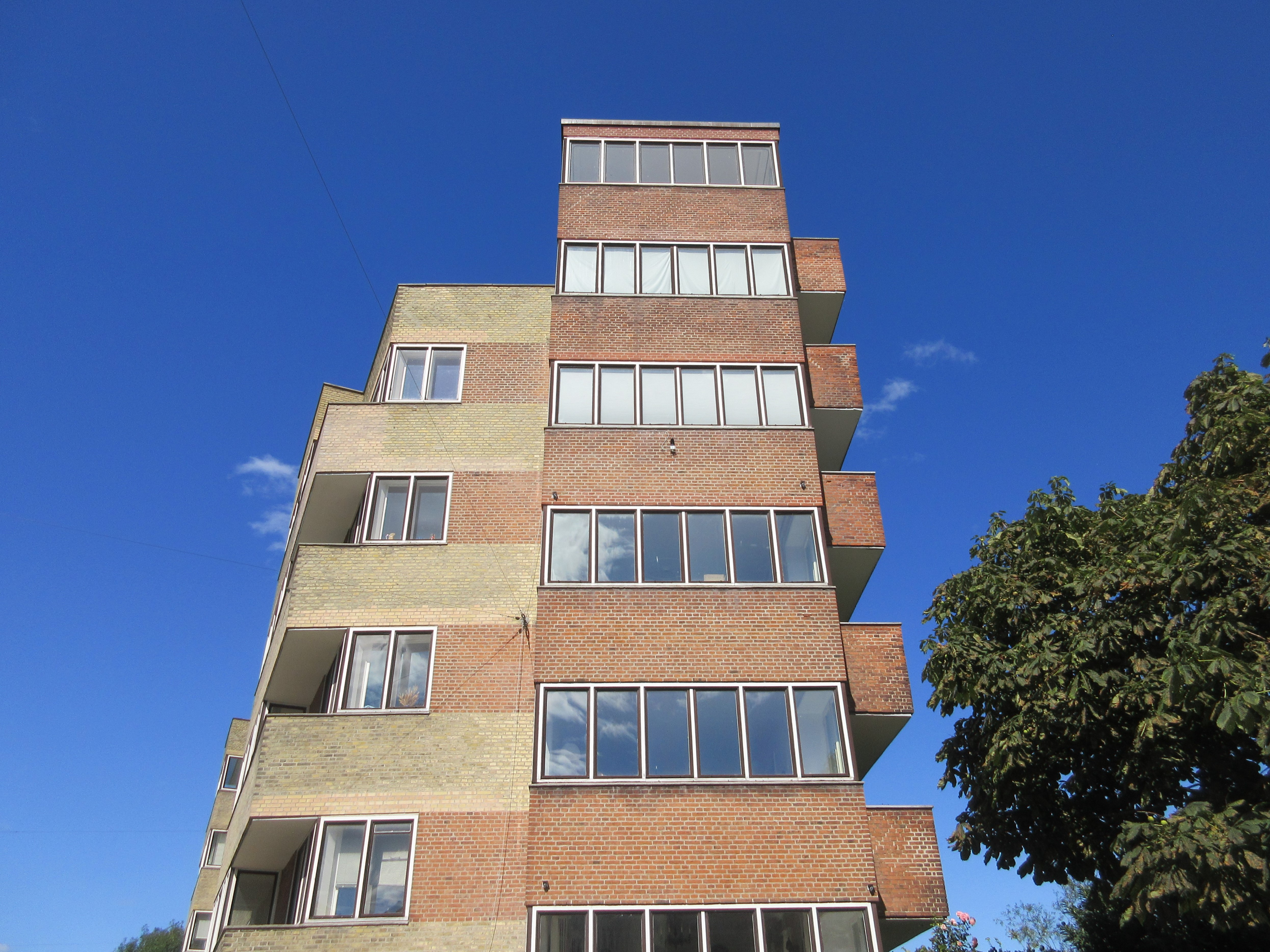

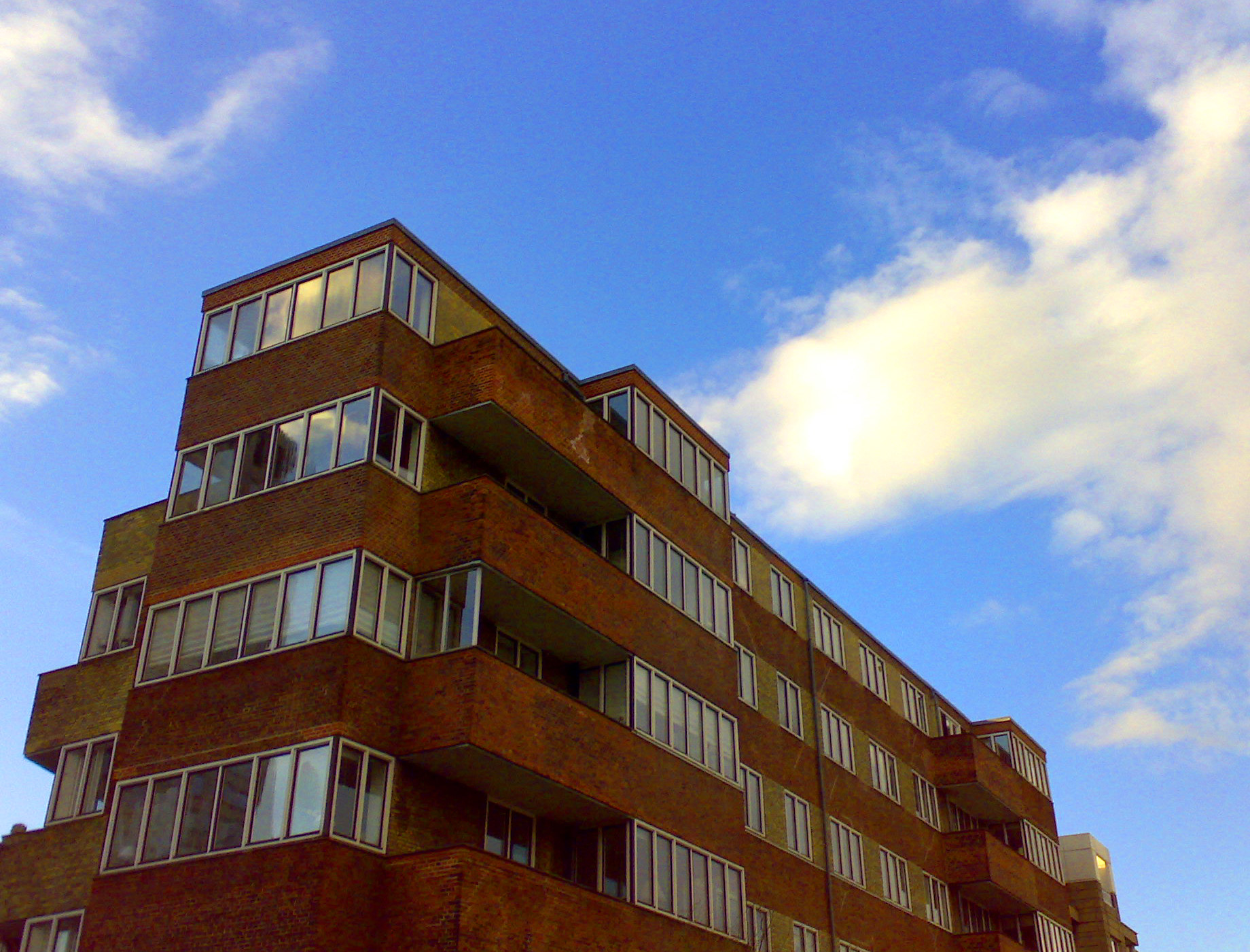
