= Dronningegården =

Residential complex in Copenhagen, Denmark

Coordinates: 55°41′4″N 12°35′3″E

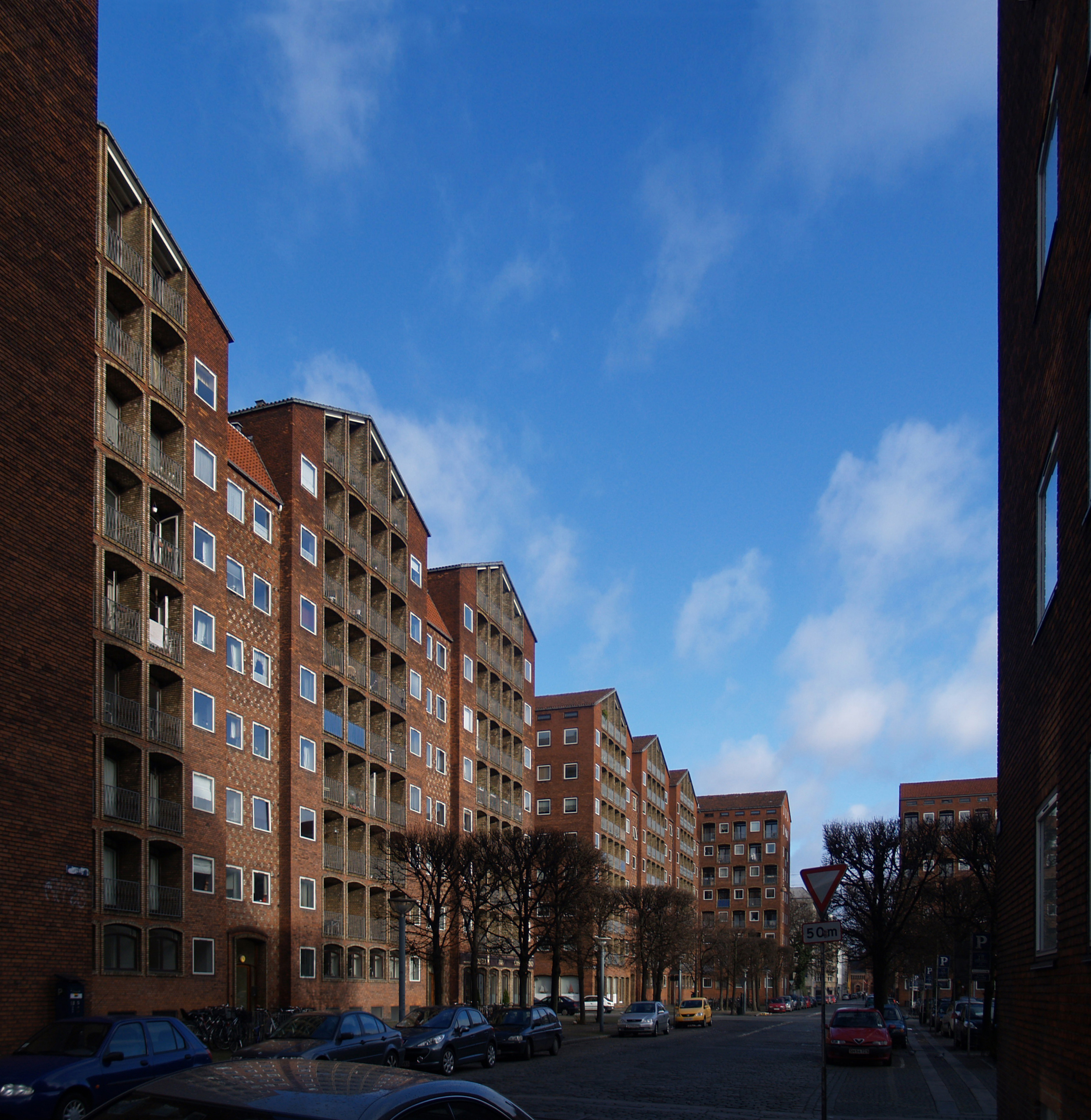
- The west side along Adelgade
- Interactive map of the Dronningegården area

General information
- Architectural style: Nordic Functionalism
- Location: Copenhagen, Denmark
- Construction started: 1943
- Completed: 1958

Design and construction
- Architects: Kay Fisker, C. F. Møller, Svenn Eske Kristensen

Dronningegården is a Modernist residential complex in central Copenhagen, Denmark, consisting of four L-shaped buildings defining an urban space around the intersection of Adelgade and Dronningens Tværgade. Designed by Kay Fisker in collaboration with C. F. Møller and Svenn Eske Kristensen, it was built between 1943 and 1958, during the transition from Traditionalism to Modernism, as a notable example of Nordic Functionalism.

== History ==
Dronningegården was built as the result of one of the first and largest condemnation initiatives in Copenhagen. The area around Borgergade and Adelgade had escaped both the Great Fires of 1728 and 1795 but the old houses, many of which dated from the late 17th or 18th century had fallen into disrepair and their gardens and courtyards were built over, transforming the neighbourhood into the most notorious slum in the city. In 1939 it was decided to renew the area. Demolition began in the early 1940s. Dronningegården was one of the residential projects which was planned in the area.

The two western corners were built during World War II, but the project was put on hold in 1943 and the eastern part was not completed until 15 years later.

== Architecture ==
Dronningegården is characterised by a Functionalist design that balances monumentality with local tradition. The four L-shaped buildings are 9 storeys tall and are built in red machine-moulded brick with detailing in yellow brick. Bricks are laid in the English bond with recessed joints. The west and east sides of the complex, which run parallel to Adelgade, are broken up by alternating gabled sections with open, recessed balconies, and inter-connecting sections decorated with cross motifs in yellow brick. The interior sides of balconies and entrances are clad in yellow brick.

The original intention was to build Dronningegården in yellow brick to resemble the buildings that had been demolished. However the design was shaped by the shortage of materials during the war and red brick was chosen instead. The arches above the windows were chosen to minimize the need for cement and iron.

== Urban space ==
The tall, homogeneous facades define the four sides of a central urban space. This arrangement was inspired from the English garden squares.

The use of gables on two sides of the complex serves to enhance Dronningens Tværgade as an axis. The concept with two intersecting axes bears testament to the planning of nearby Frederiksstaden around two axes, along Frederiksgade and Amaliegade, which intersect at the central plaza of Amalienborg Palace.

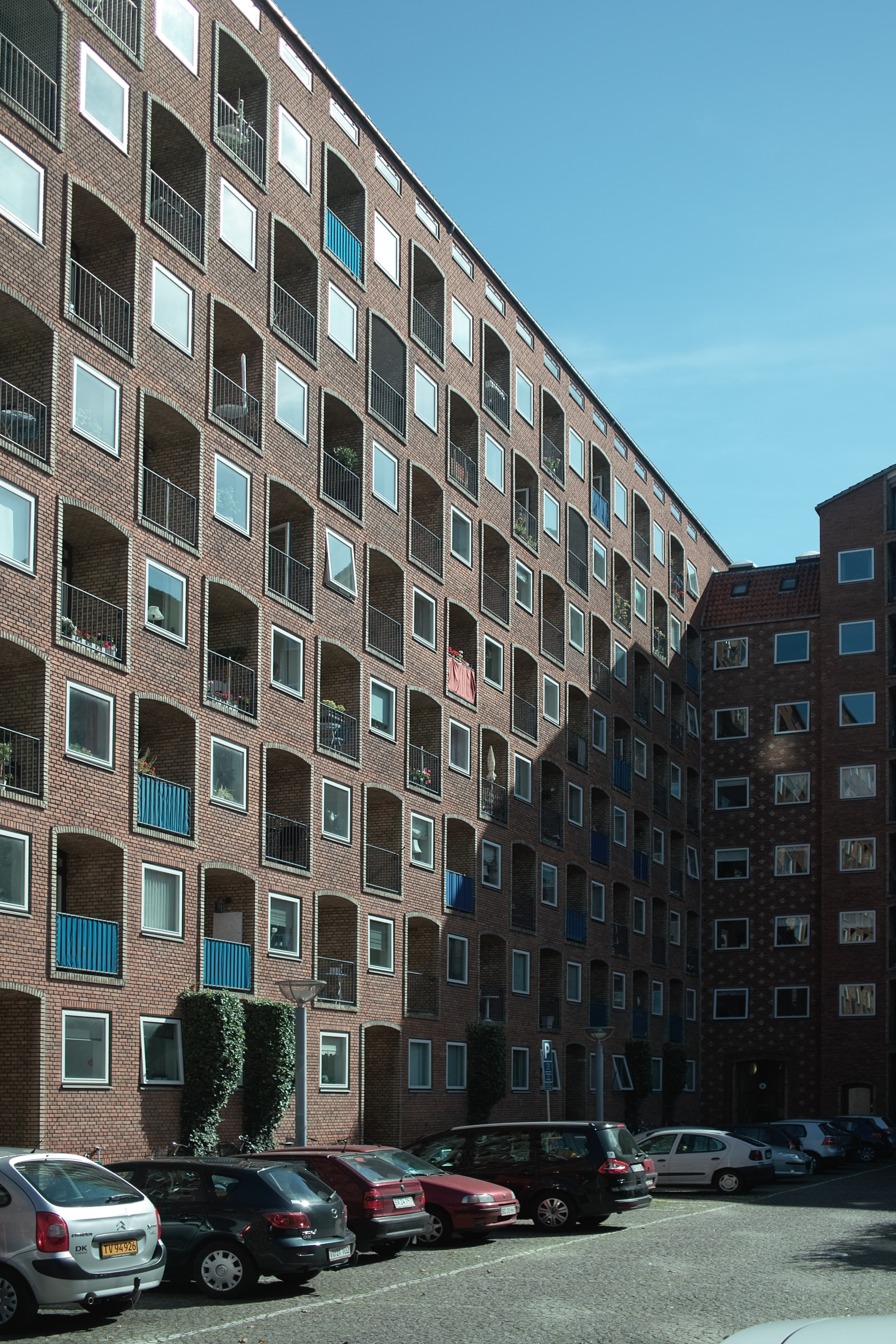
The north-east corner

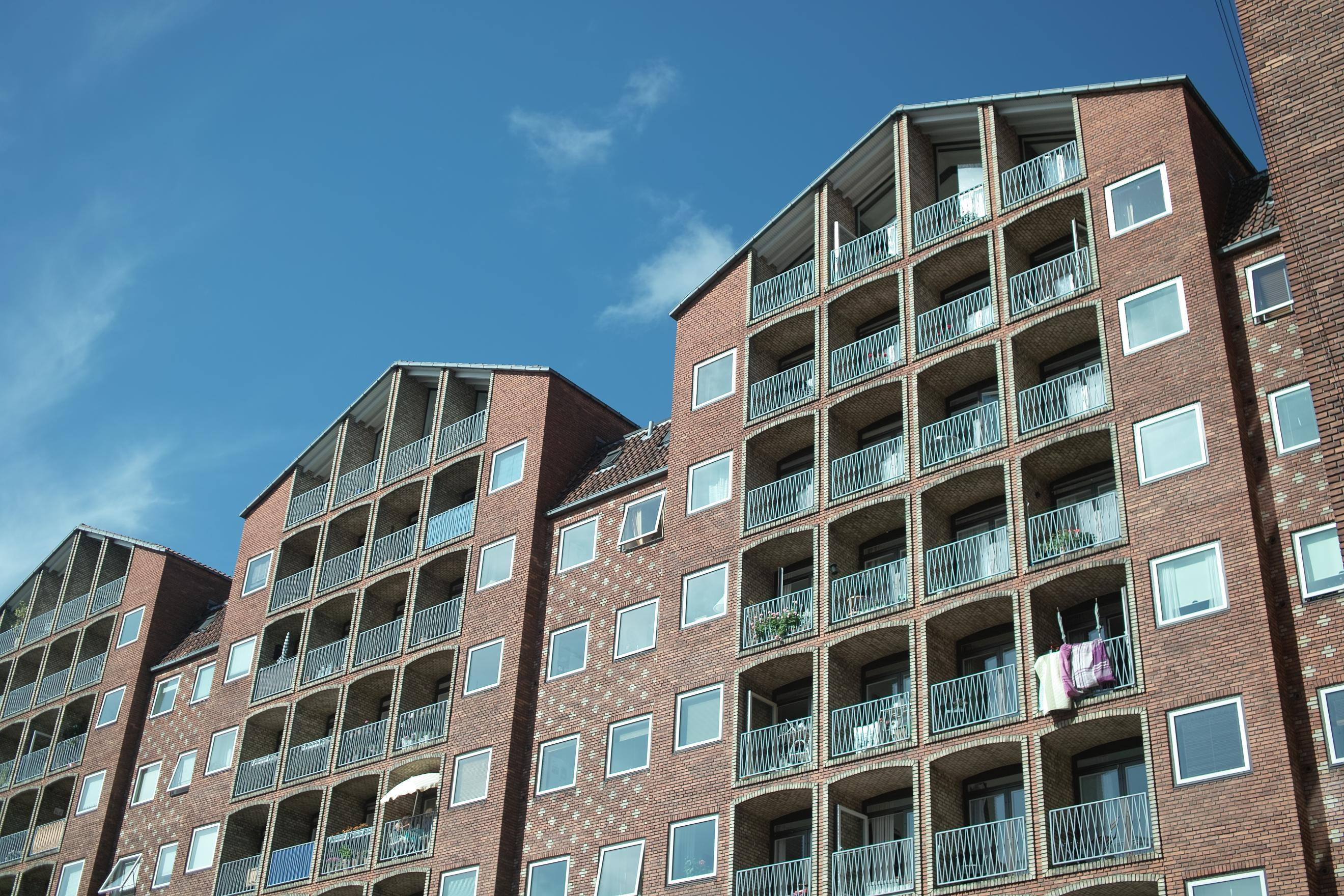
Balconies

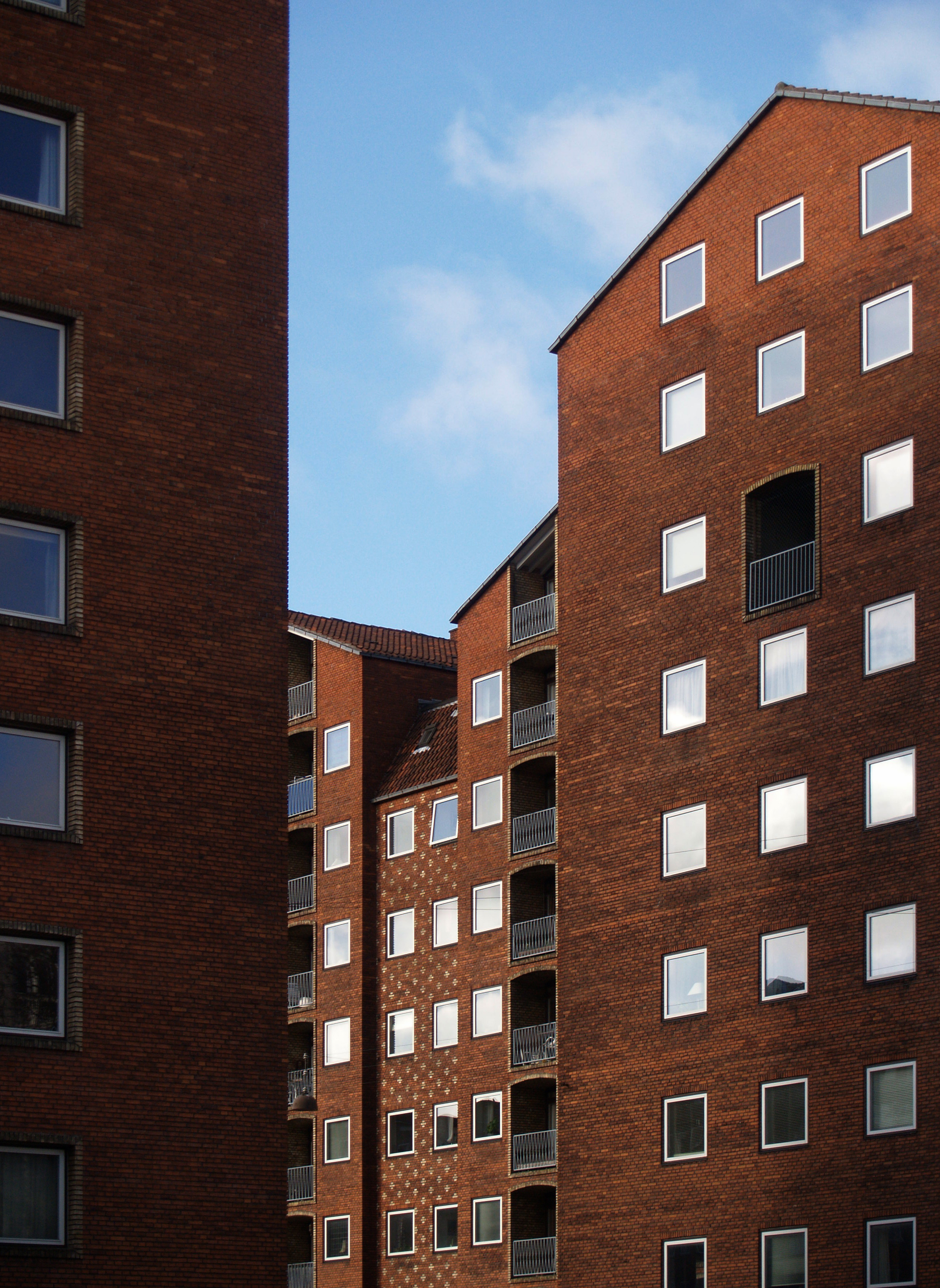
Patterned section

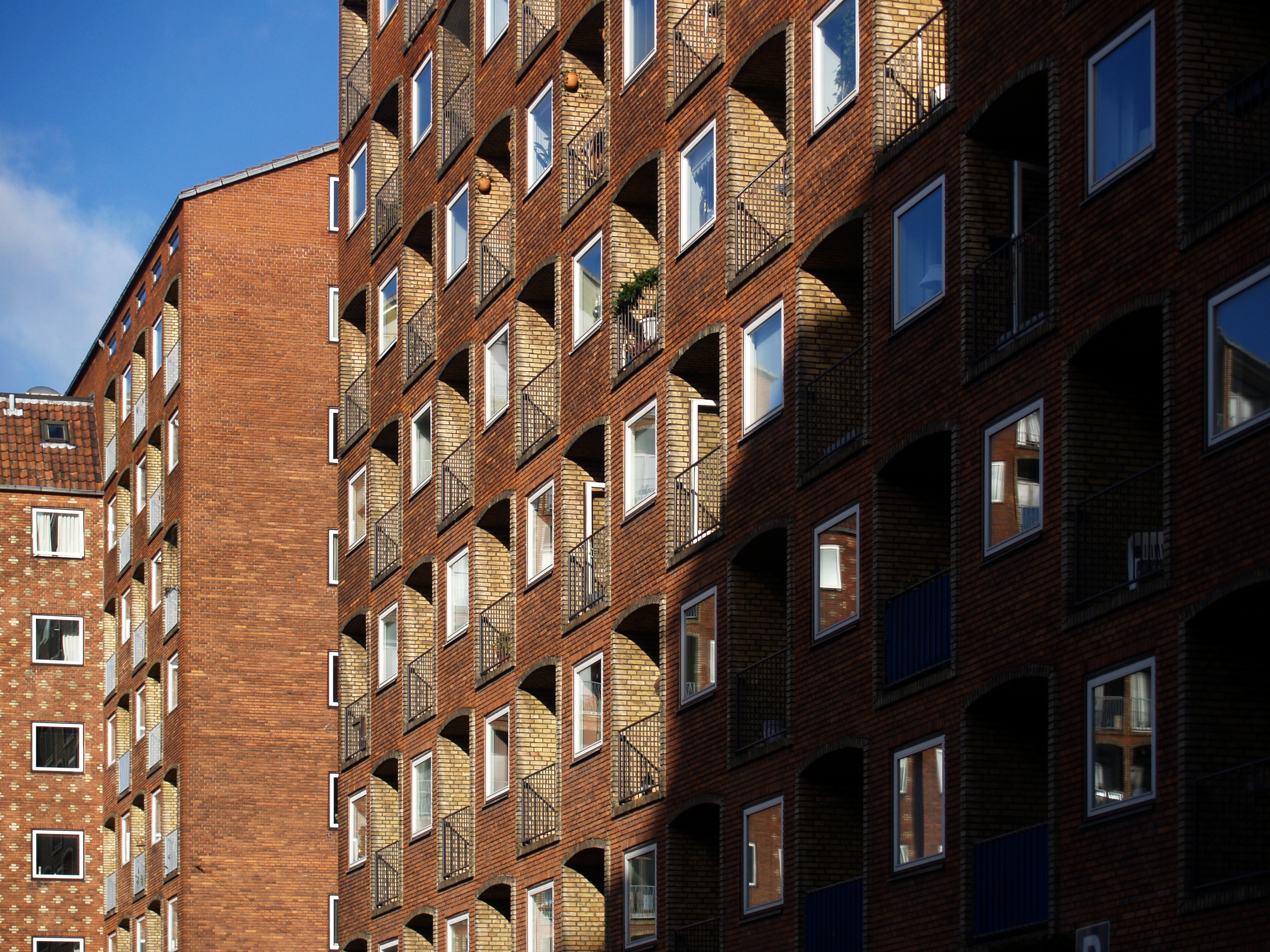
Yellow internal walls

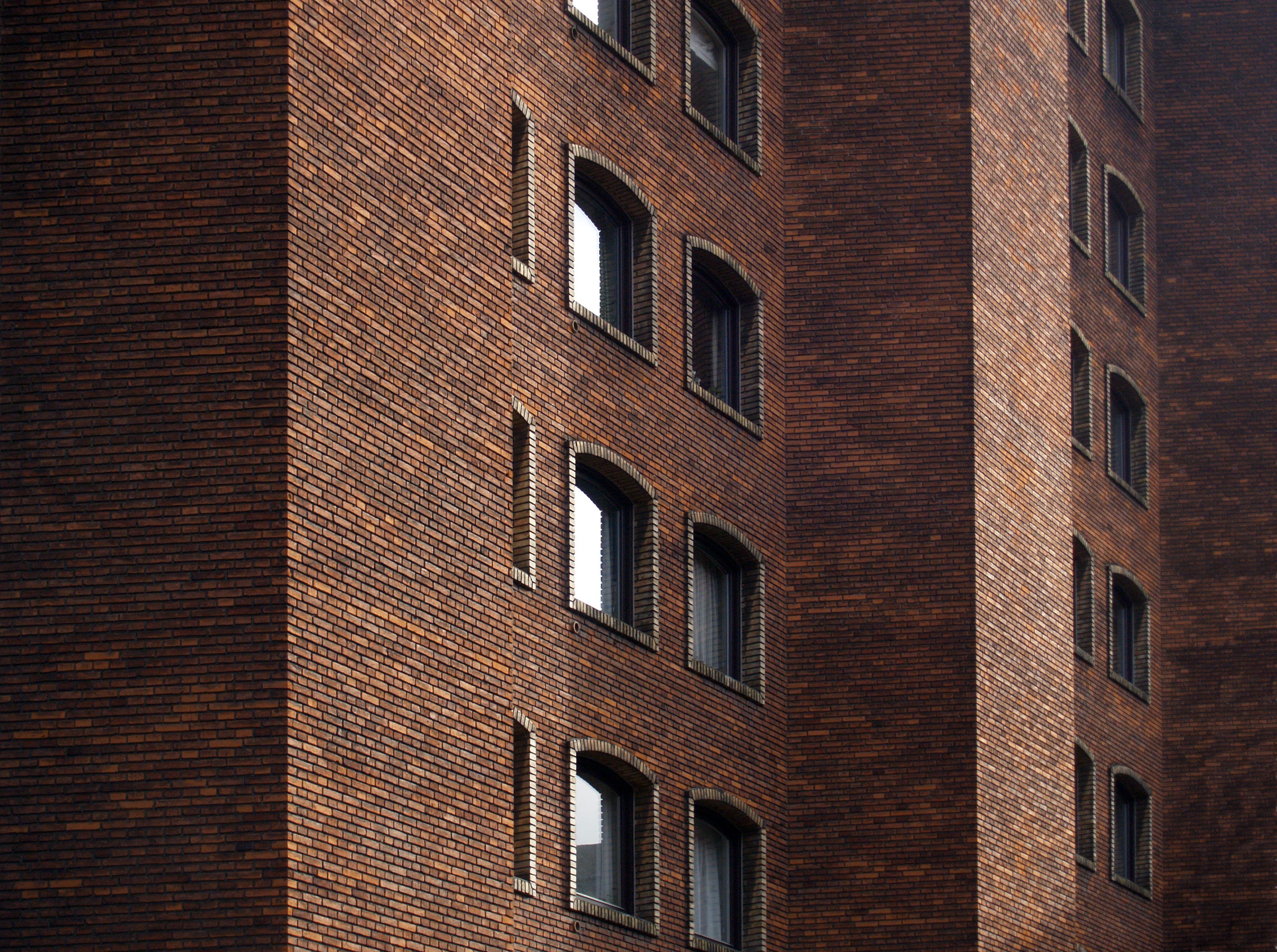
Masonry and windows

== Dronningegården today ==
The four buildings are individually known as Prinsessegården, Dronningegården, Kongegården and Christiansgården. They contain a total of 160 apartments. Contrary to the original intentions, the central space is today mainly used for parking.

== See also ==
- Architecture of Denmark
