= Kay Fisker =

Danish architect

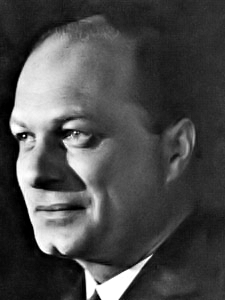
- Born: 14 February 1893; Frederiksberg, Denmark
- Died: 21 June 1965 (aged 72); Copenhagen, Denmark
- Occupation: Architect
- Awards: C. F. Hansen Medal (1947); Heinrich Tessenow Medal (1964)
- Buildings: Aarhus University

Kay Otto Fisker Hon. FAIA (14 February 1893 – 21 June 1965) was a Danish architect, designer and educator. He is mostly known for his many housing projects, mainly in the Copenhagen area, and is considered a leading exponent of Danish Functionalism.

== Education and education ==
Kay Fisker was born on 14 February 1893 in Frederiksberg, Copenhagen. His parents were pharmacist Asmus Marius Fisker and Petra Louise Jacobsen. He entered the Royal Danish Academy of Fine Arts in 1909 and while there worked at the offices of leading Scandinavian architects such as Anthon Rosen, Sigurd Lewerentz, Gunnar Asplund, and Hack Kampmann parallel to his studies.

== Career ==
In 1915, in collaboration with Aage Rafn, Fisker won a competition to design the railway stations along the Almindingen-Gudhjem railway on the Danish island of Bornholm.

After graduating, his career as a practising architect was dominated by numerous influential residential projects. Vestersøhus was built from 1935 to 1939 by Fisker and C. F. Møller. It instantly became a model in Denmark for the balcony and bay window blocks of the time.

A key building in his production was Aarhus University (1931–43), considered to be one of the most important examples of Danish Functionalism, which he designed in collaboration with C. F. Møller, Povl Stegmann, and Carl Theodor Marius Sørensen. Kay Fisker also designed the Danish Academy in Rome. A later residential project was the Dronningegården housing estate in Copenhagen.

== Academia ==
From 1936 to 1963 Fisker was a professor at the Royal Academy and as teacher of the school's class on housing he was known as an inspiring lecturer with great influence on Danish housing culture. In 1953 and 1957 he was a visiting professor at the Massachusetts Institute of Technology.

== Writings ==
In his writings, Fisker argued in favour of an anonymous and timeless architecture, not fashionable individual achievements. In the 1964 article "Personal Worship or Anonymity", Fisker emphasized the importance of our surroundings being characterized by a whole - as opposed to simply consisting of a number of individual, sensational works. According to Fisker, architecture should be a framework for a 'natural' way of life, not an end in itself.

== Selected buildings ==
- Railway stations, Bornholm (1915–15)
- Valnøddevænget 10, Helsingør (1918)
- Hornbækhus housing, Copenhagen (1922)
- Vodroffsvej 2, Frederiksberg (1929)
- Århus University, Århus (1932–43)
- Vester Søhus housing, Copenhagen (with C. F. Møller, 1935–39)
- Fogedgården, Copenhagen (1943–46)
- Dronningegården housing, Copenhagen (with Eske Kristensen, 1943–58)
- Voldparken housing, Copenhagen (with others, 1945–51)
- Danish Academy in Rome, Rome, Italy (1963–65)
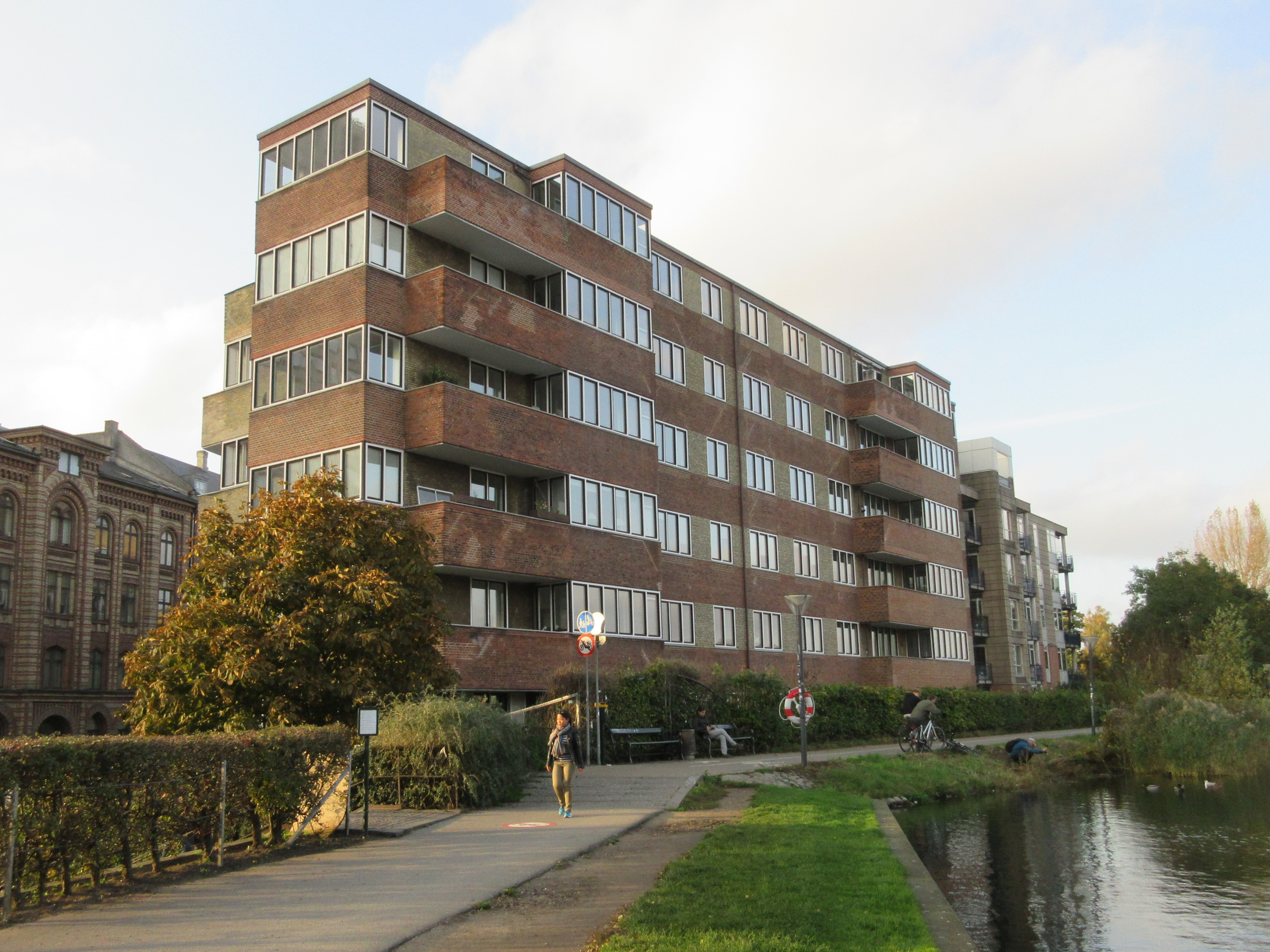
Vordroffsvej 2, Frederiksberg (1930)

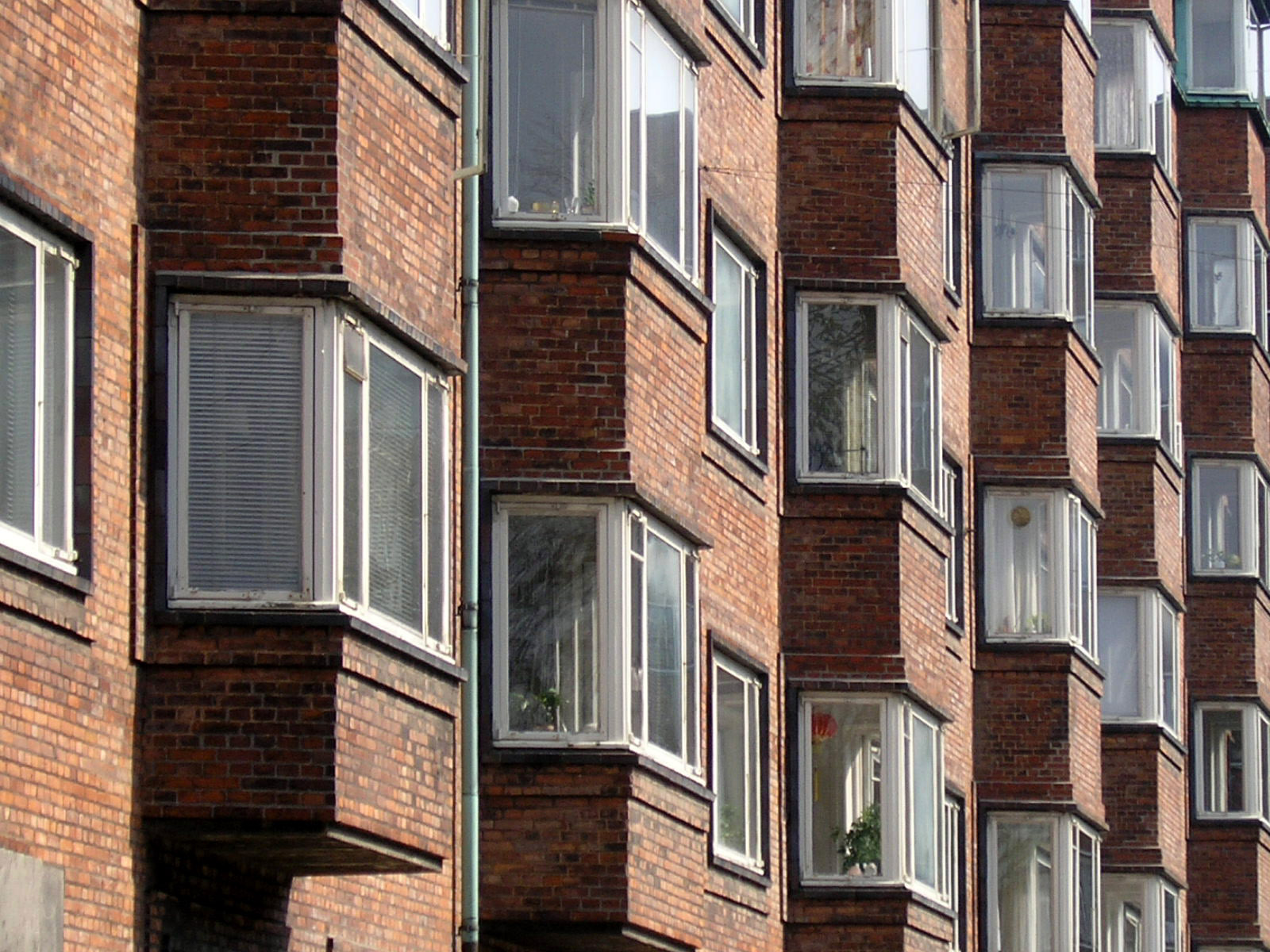
The multi-storey bays and windows are typical of the Nordic funkis style

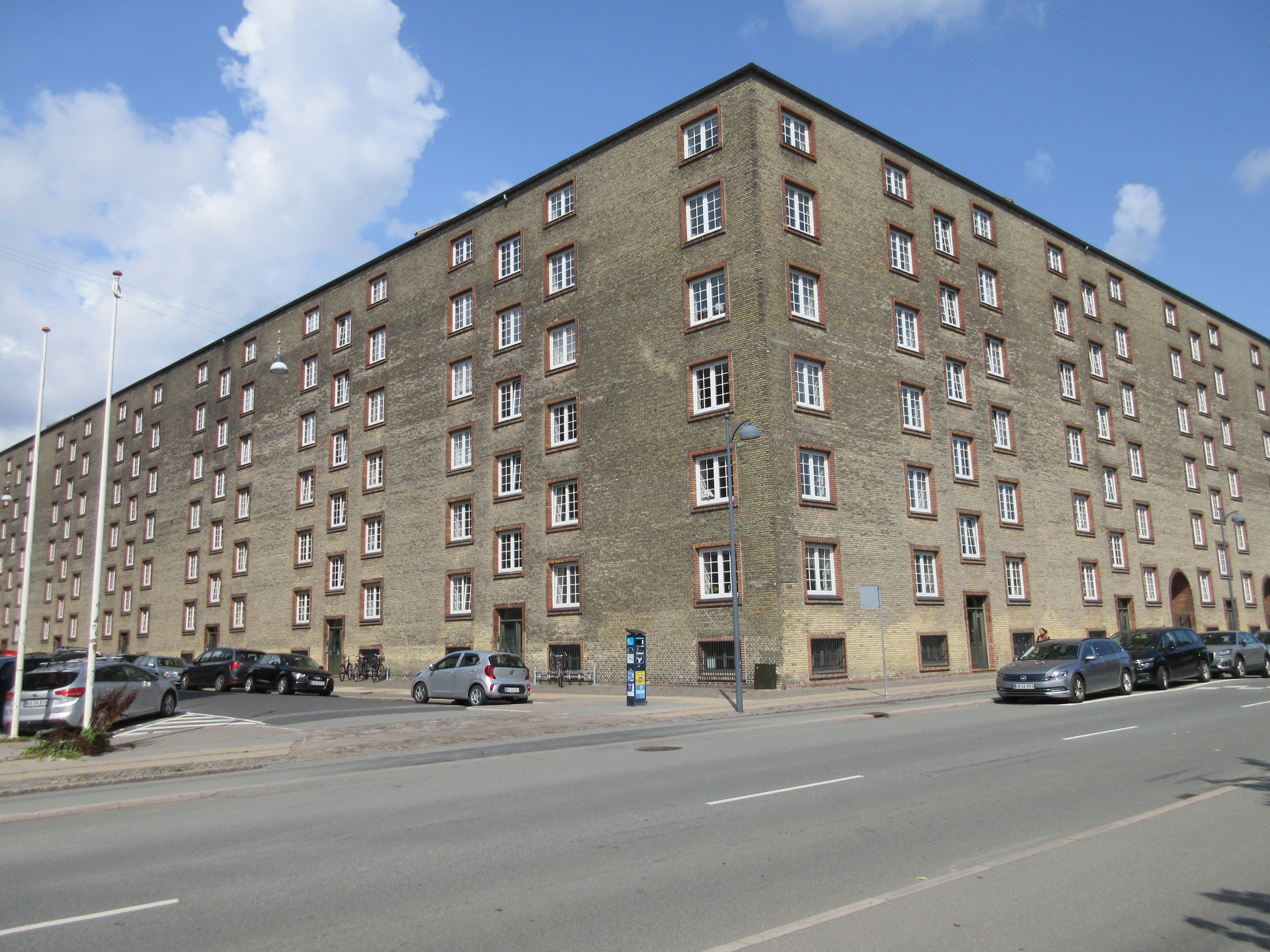
Gullfosshus (1932). Monumental brick structures.

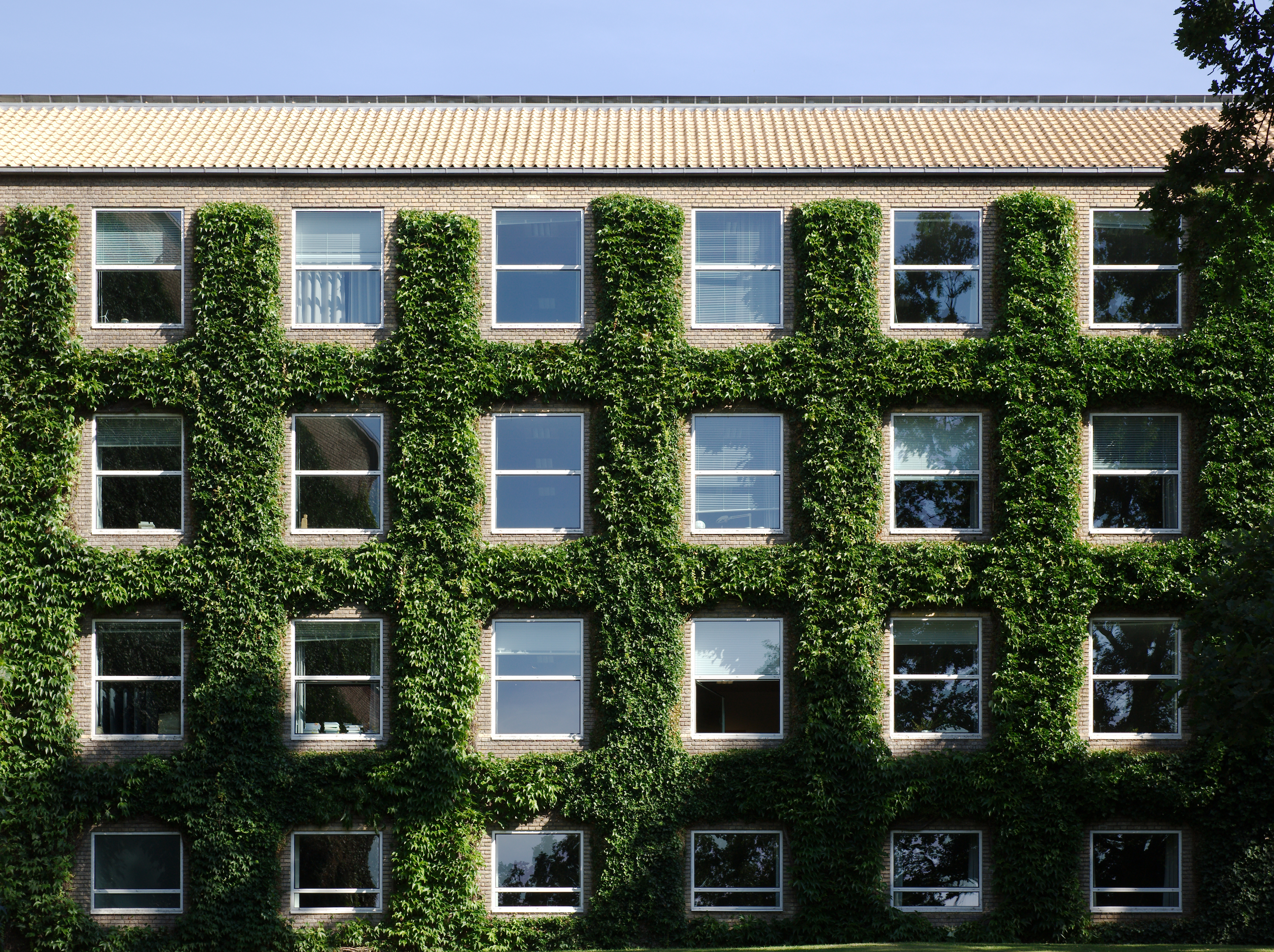
Aarhus University, facade detail.

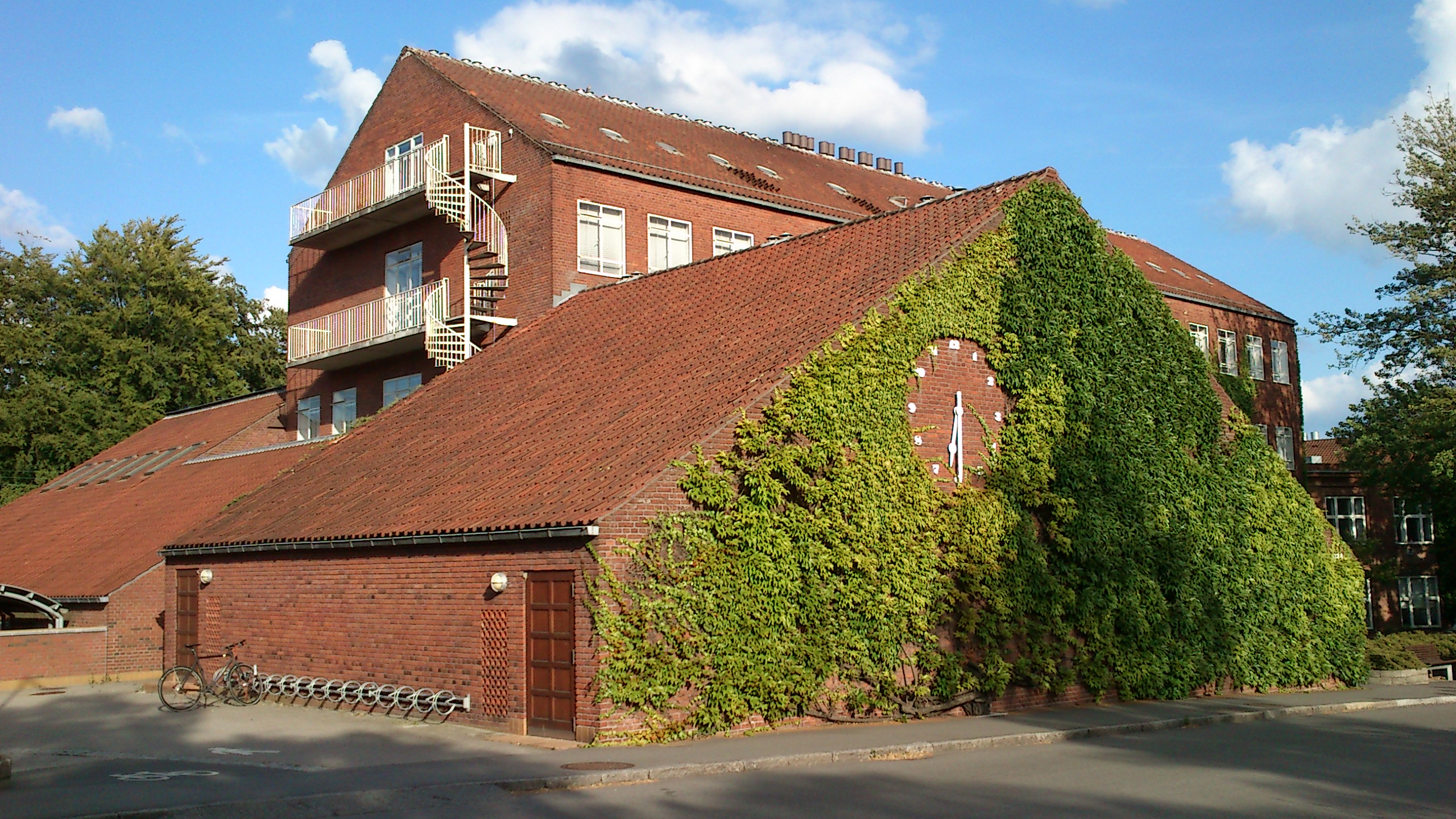
Århus Municipal Hospital, now Aarhus University

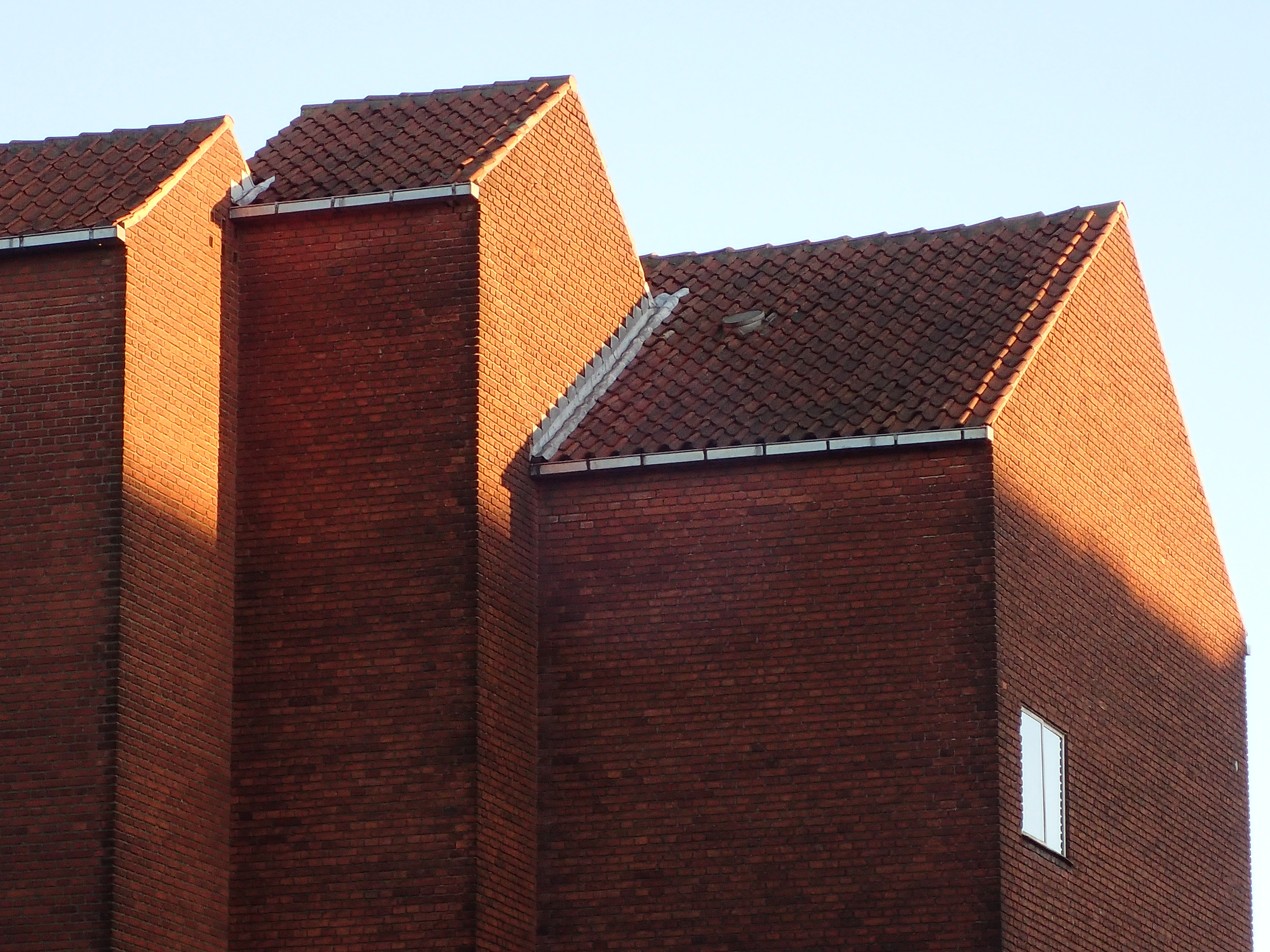
Århus Municipal Hospital, detail. Simple harmonious brick elements.

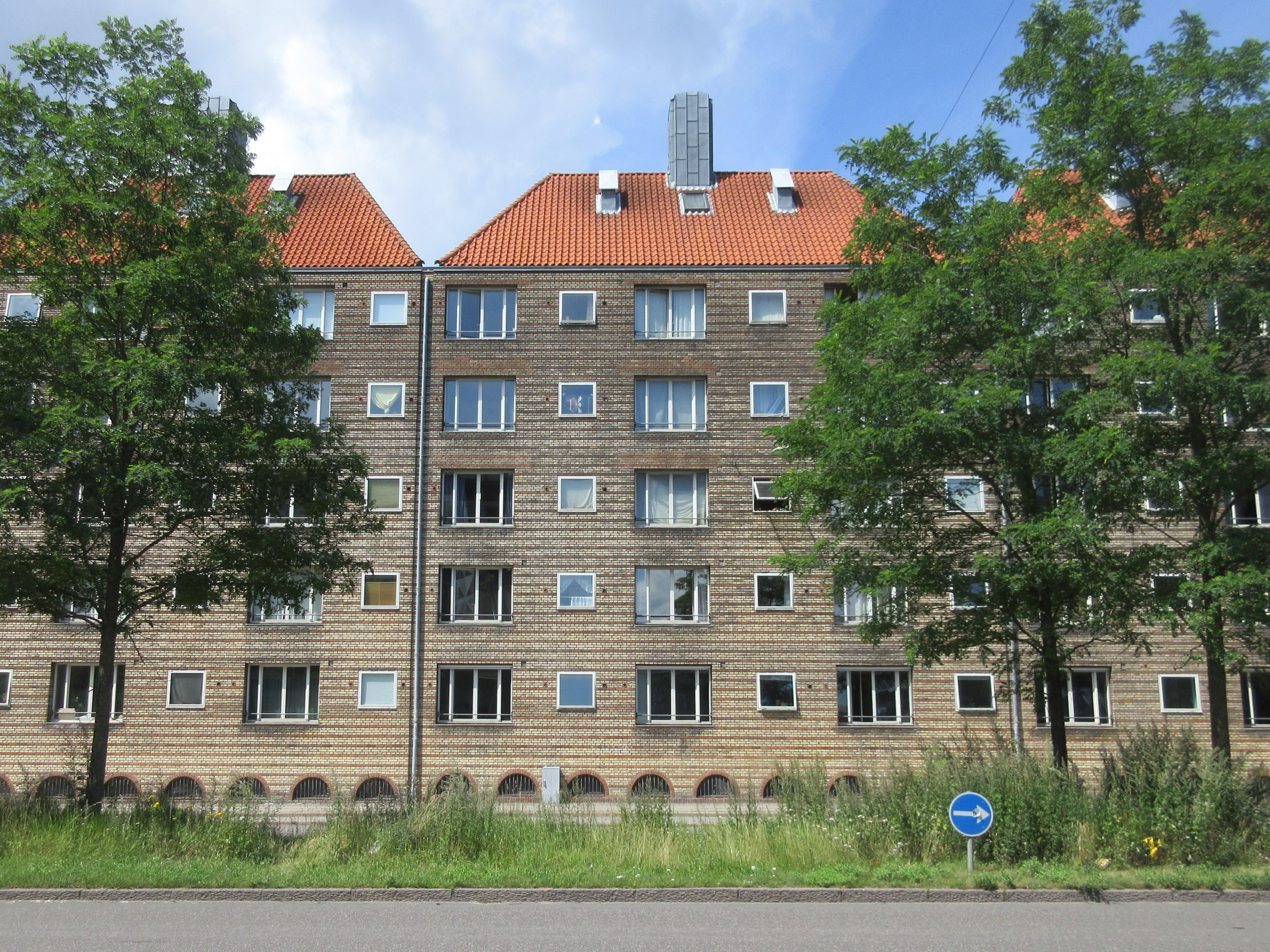
Fogedgården, Copenhagen (1043–46=

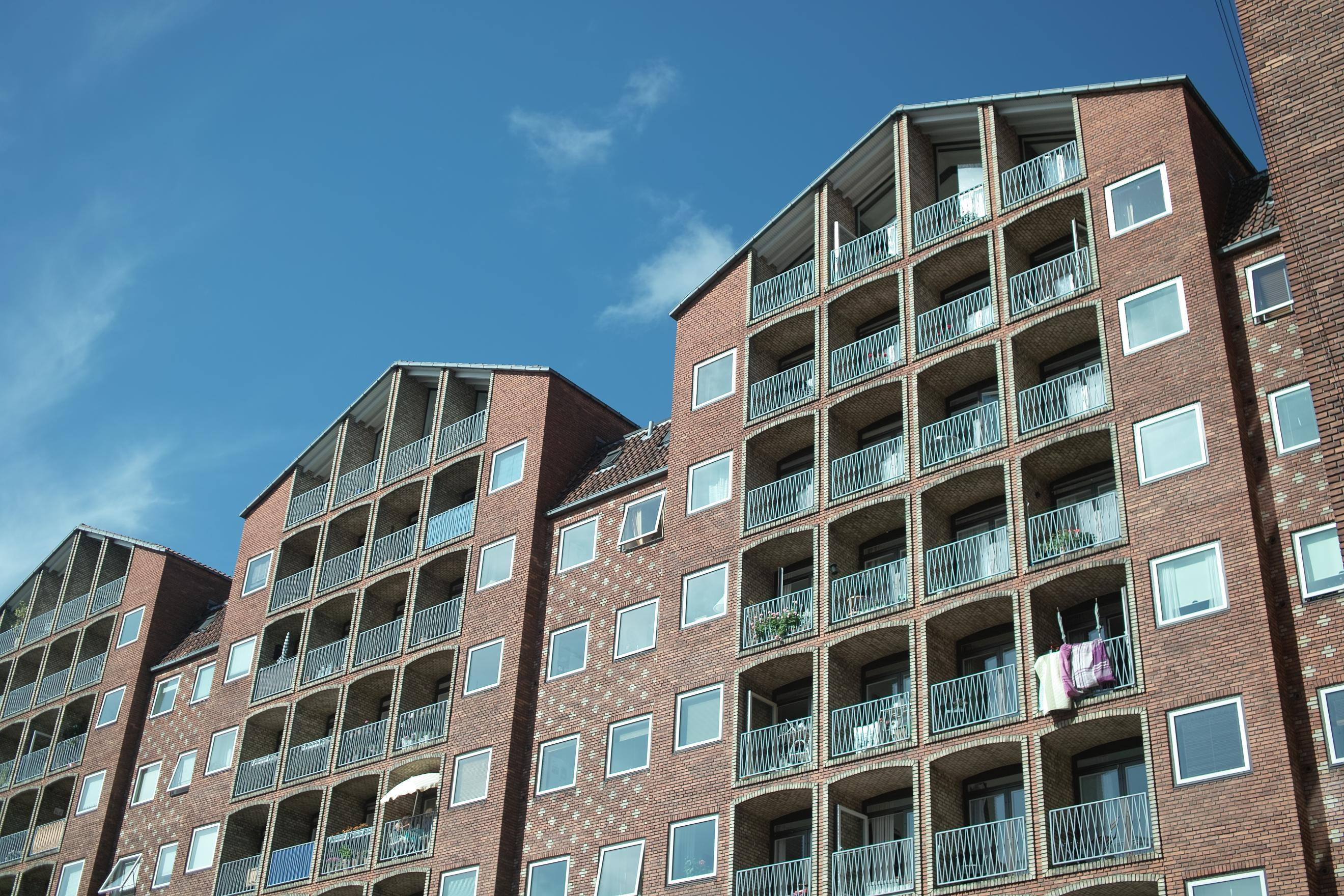
Dronningegården.

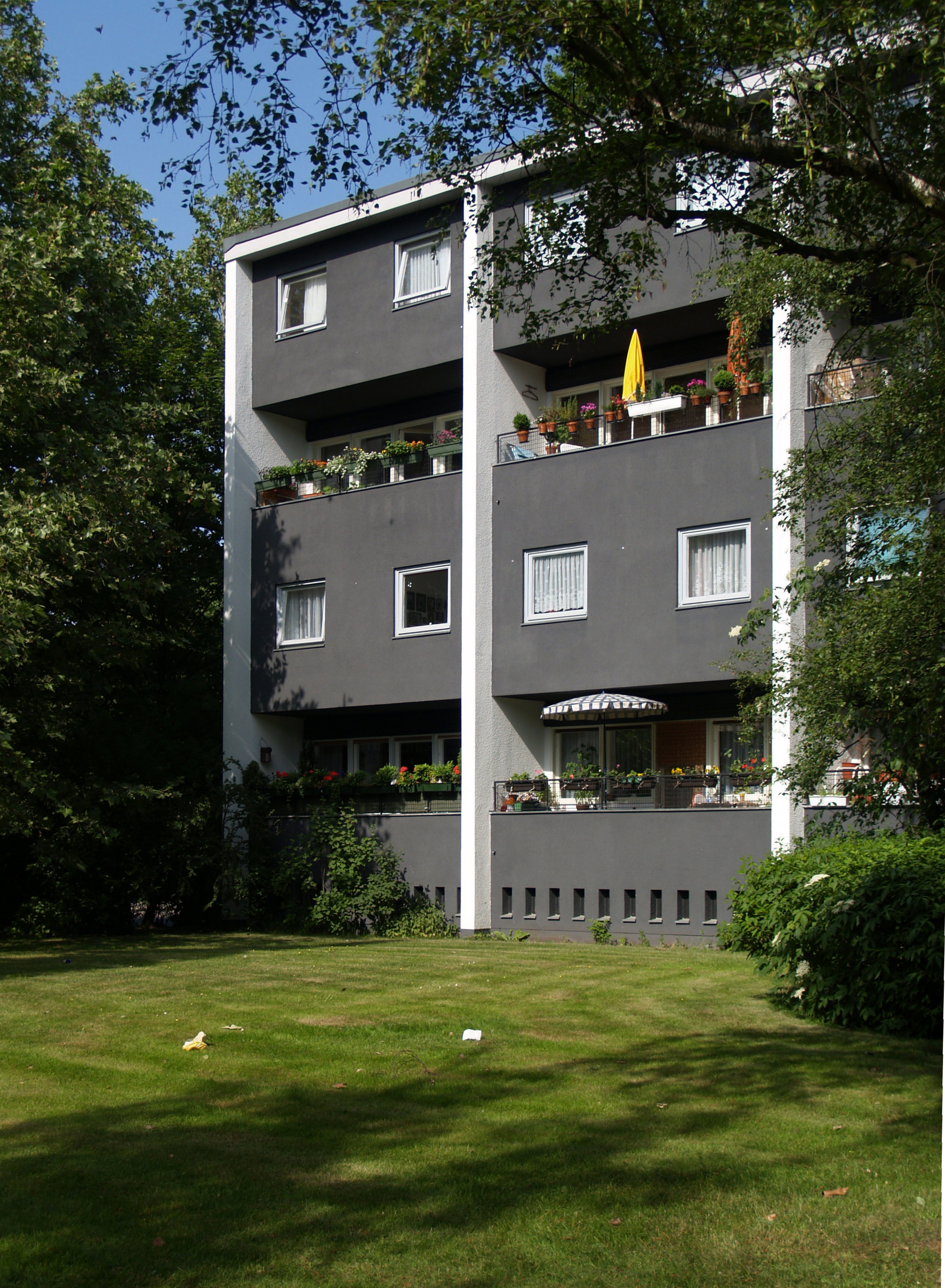
Haus Fisker apartment block in Berlin (1957). Typical modernist elements.

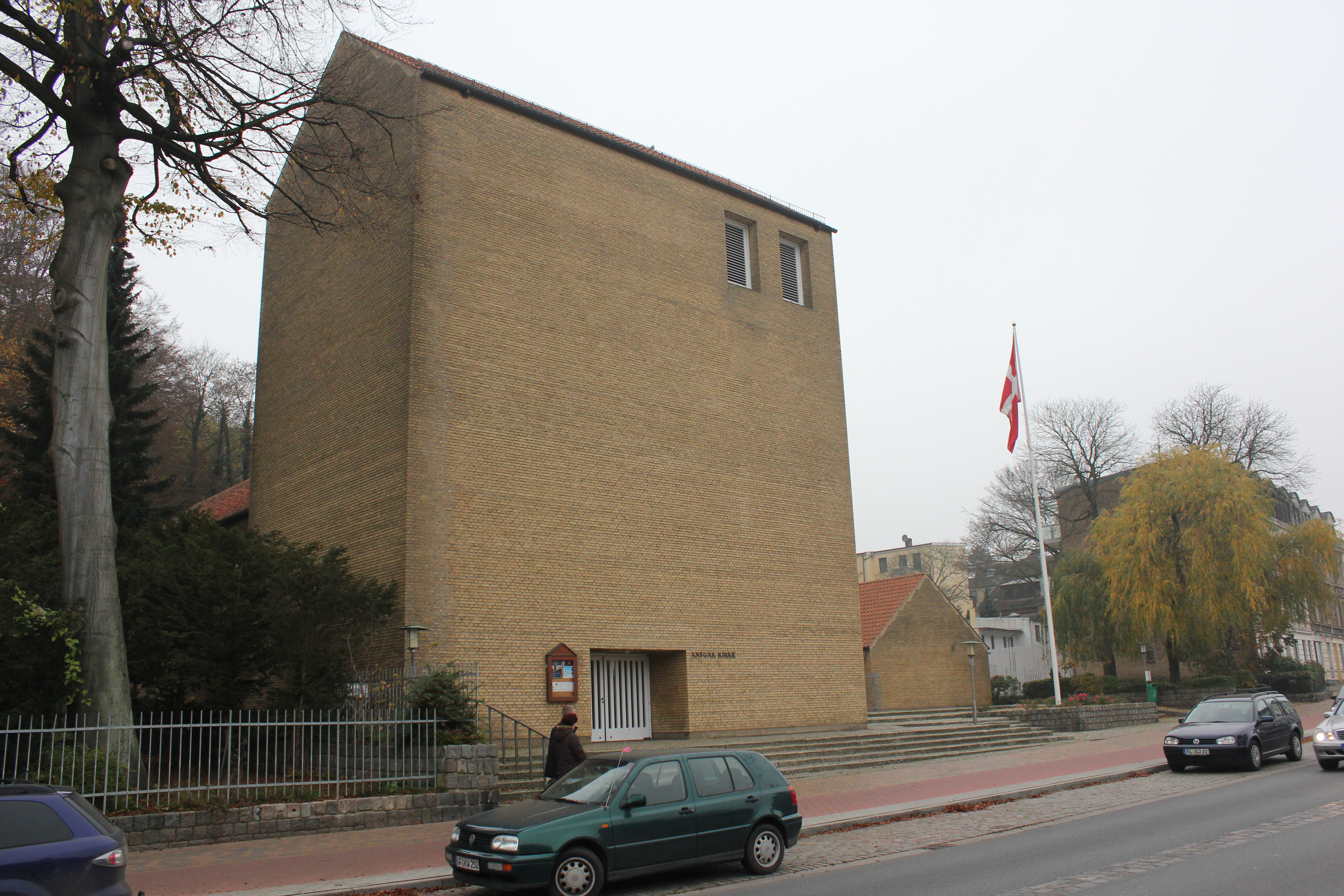
Ansgar Kirke, Flensburg, Germany

== Awards ==
- 1926: Eckersberg Medal
- 1947: C. F. Hansen Medal
- 1958: Prince Eugen Medal for architecture
- 1964: Heinrich Tessenow Medal

== Bibliography ==
- Ibler, Marianne: Kay Fisker and the Danish Academy in Rome. Archipress. March 2006. ISBN 978-87-91872-00-6
- Luca Ortelli, Kay Fisker, architetto danese / Kay Fisker, Danish architect, Casabella 957, Mondadori, Milano 2024, pp. 36-109

== See also ==
- Architecture of Denmark
