= Povl Stegmann =

Danish architect (1888–1944)

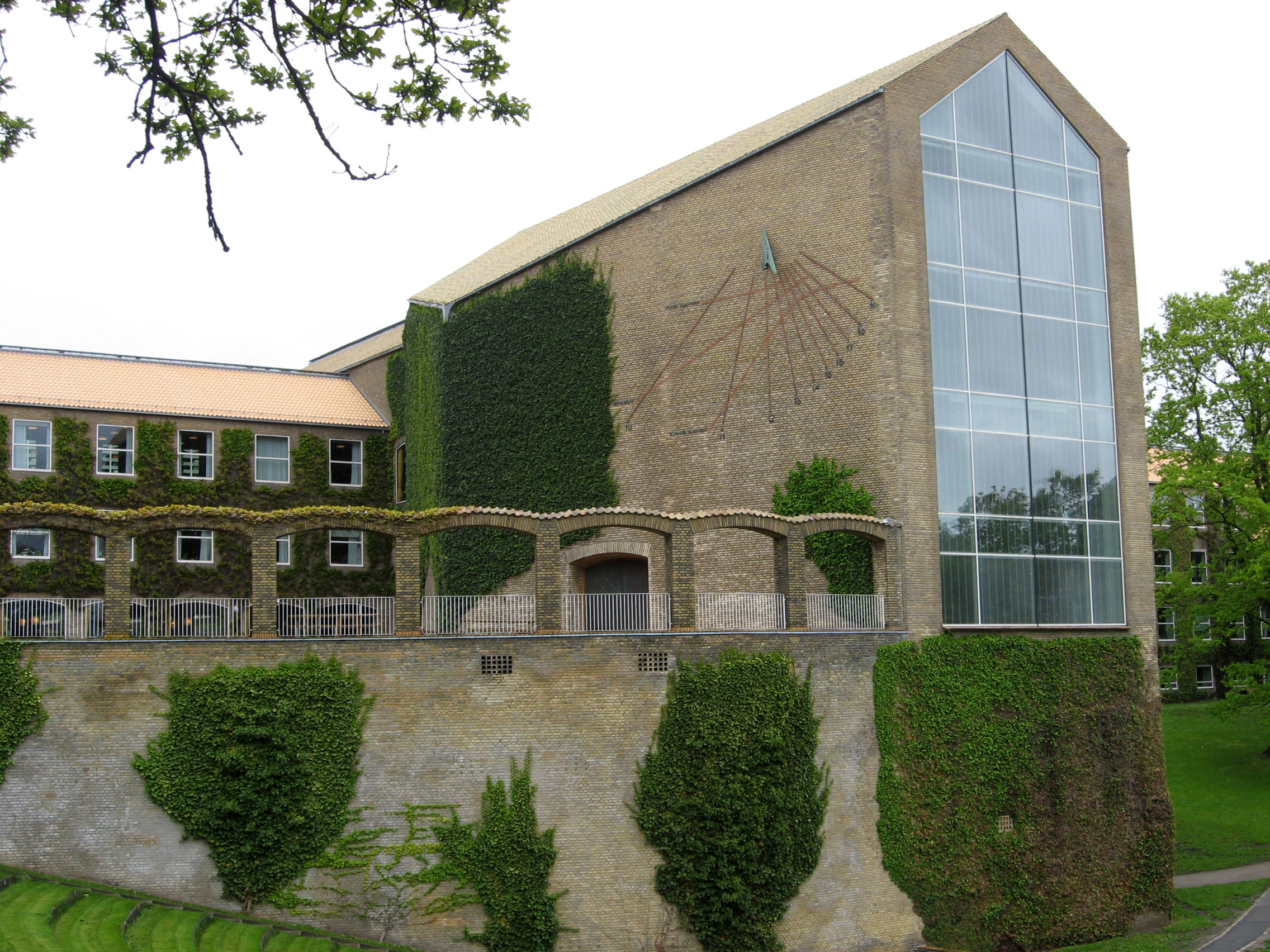
Aarhus University: rear of main building

Povl Christian Stegmann (1888–1944) was a Danish architect remembered for designing Aarhus University in collaboration with Kay Fisker and C. F. Møller. His name is included in the Danish Culture Canon.

== Early life ==
Born in Aarhus, Stegmann apprenticed as a mason before attending Aarhus Technical School where he matriculated in 1908. He went on to study architecture at the Royal Danish Academy of Fine Arts under Anton Rosen and Hack Kampmann from 1909 to 1919. Among his fellow students were Kay Fisker, Aage Rafn and Einer Dyggve, all together with Stegmann participants in the development of the Skønvirke style, a blend of the German Jugendstil and the French Art Nouveau with a Danish Historicist dimension.

== Career ==
Stegmann's first major assignment was the Aarhus housing development in Stadion Allé (1930). The same year a competition was launched for a university in Aarhus. Stegmann, who had studied contemporary university architecture while travelling in Europe, submitted a proposal together with Kay Fisker and his younger colleague C. F. Møller. Inspired by Hannes Meyer's trades union college in Bernau near Berlin, it consisted of a structure divided into several small departments, carefully adapted to the building site with the assistance of the landscape architect C.Th. Sørensen. The proposal won first prize but when Stegmann became head of the Technical School in Aalborg, he withdrew from the consortium. Stegmann is also remembered for his analysis of the detached one-family home (1933) which became compulsory reading for practicing architects.

== German occupation victim ==
Under the German occupation in November 1944, Stegmann was shot dead outside his home in Aalborg, apparently in return for the activities of the resistance movement.
