= C. F. Møller =

Danish architect (1898–1988)

Christian Frederik Møller
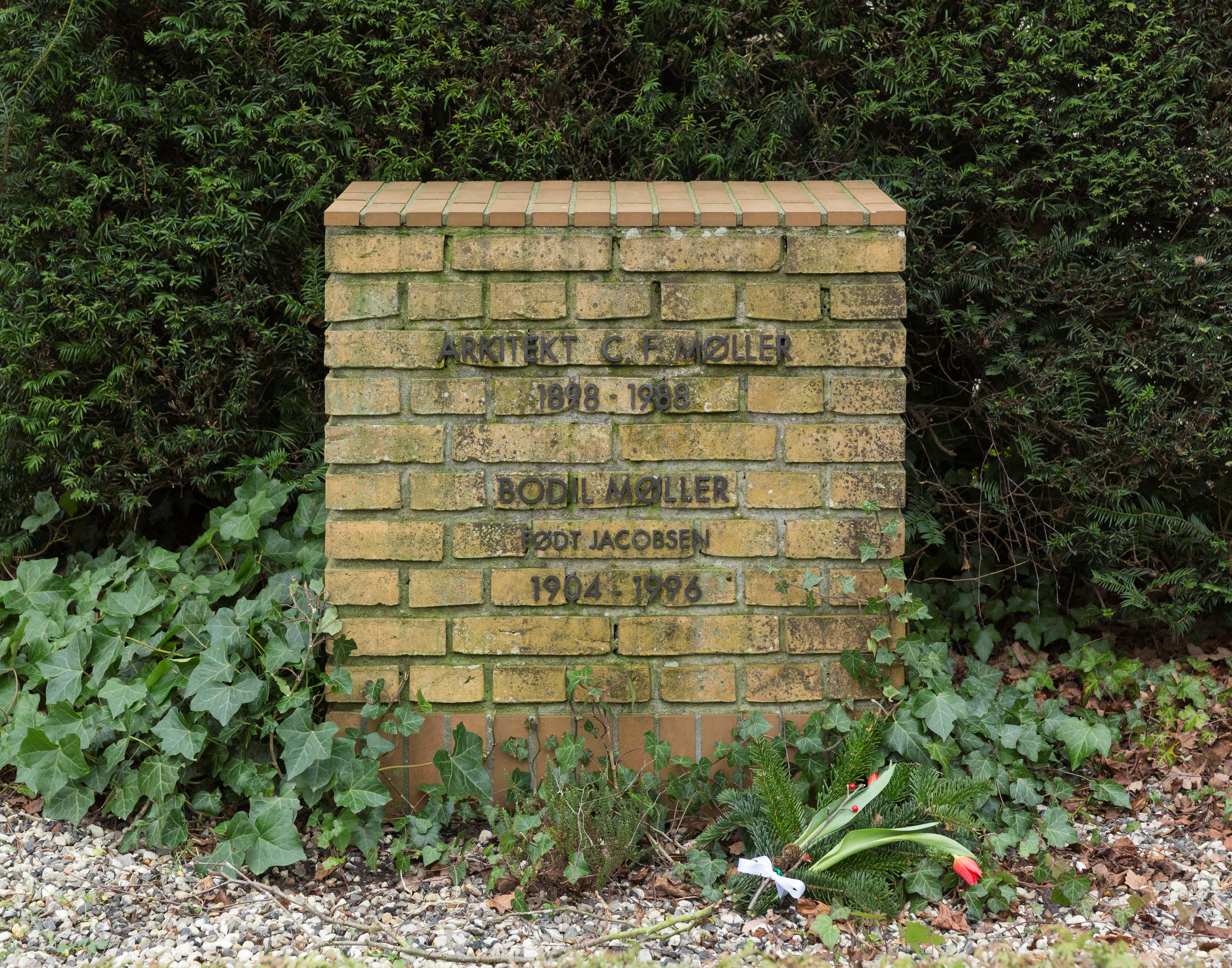
- C.F. Møller's gravestone
- Born: 31 October 1898; Skanderborg, Denmark
- Died: 5 November 1988 (aged 90); Aarhus, Denmark
- Occupation: Architect
- Awards: Eckersberg Medal (1845); C. F. Hansen Medal (1947)
- Practice: Arkitektfirmaet C. F. Møller
- Buildings: Aarhus University

Christian Frederik Møller (31 October 1898 – 5 November 1988), generally referred to as C. F. Møller, was a Danish architect, professor and, from 1965 to 1969, the first rector of the Aarhus School of Architecture. His former practice, Arkitektfirmaet C. F. Møller, which he founded in 1924, still exists and bears his name. It is today the largest architectural firm in Denmark with branch offices in several countries.

== Biography ==
Christian Frederik Møller was born in Skanderborg, Denmark. He was the son of Valdemar Møller and Nielssine Dalby.

He first trained as a mason and later studied architecture at the Royal Danish Academy of Fine Arts in Copenhagen, graduating in 1920. He conducted study trips to England (1925); Germany, Italy and France (1927); Germany, Switzerland and Italy (1937). He exhibited at the Charlottenborg Spring Exhibition during 1952–1964, 1973, 1978, 1985.

He set up his own architectural office C.F. Møller in 1924, and in 1928 formed a partnership with the architect and Professor Kay Fisker (1893–1965) which lasted until 1942. After winning first prizes in the competitions for Aarhus Community Hospital in 1930 and Aarhus University in 1931, they established an office in Aarhus in 1932. Their buildings also include the apartment blocks 2 Vodroffsvej (1930) and Vestersøhus (1935–1939) in Copenhagen, the latter of which has remained a major influence on Danish housing architecture.

Their winning proposal for Aarhus University consisted of individual faculty buildings arranged along the margin of an undulating park setting. The first building at the site was completed in 1933. By the early 40s, the collaboration with Fisker had ended and C. F. Møller was left to complete the Aarhus University alone. Møller was present at the construction site when the British Royal Air Force bombed the university dormitories, which were occupied by the Gestapo, on 31 October 1944. During the attack, a bomb accidentally struck the main building, and Møller was lightly injured as a result, while about ten members of the construction crew were killed. The main building was completed in 1946 and the so-called Book Tower in 1962. Later works include Salling Department Store im Aarhus (1949, with Gunnar Krohn), Angligården (1965, later Herning Art Museum) and Egetæpper in Herning (1984). Møller was Royal Building Inspector from 1953 to 1968, and in 1965 he became the first rector of the newly founded Aarhus School of Architecture.

== Personal life ==
In 1928, he married Bodil Marie Jacobsen (1904–1996), their son and fellow architect Mads Møller was born in 1942. Christian died in Aarhus at 90 years of age and was buried at Vestre Cemetery (Aarhus) in Aarhus.

== Selected projects ==
- Aarhus Community Hospital, Aarhus, Denmark (with Kay Fisker)
- Aarhus University, Aarhus, Denmark (with Fisker and Povl Stegmann)
- 2 Vodroffsvej, Copenhagen (1930, with Fisker)
- Vestersøhus, Copenhagen, Denmark (1935–1939, with Fisker)
- Sønderjyllandshallen, Aabenraa, Denmark
- Centralinstitutionen Sølund, in Skanderborg, Denmark (1935)
- Salling Department Store, Aarhus, Denmark (1949, with Gunnar Krohn)
- Carl-Henning Pedersen & Else Alfelts Museum, Herning, Denmark (1976, with C.Th. Sørensen)
- Pindstrup Church, Djursland, Denmark (1968)
- Middelfart Hospital
- DR Aarhus, Danish Broadcasting Corporation's headquarters in Aarhus (1981, with Sven Hansen)

== Honours ==
- 1945 Eckersberg Medal
- 1947 C. F. Hansen Medal

== Gallery ==
Aarhus University

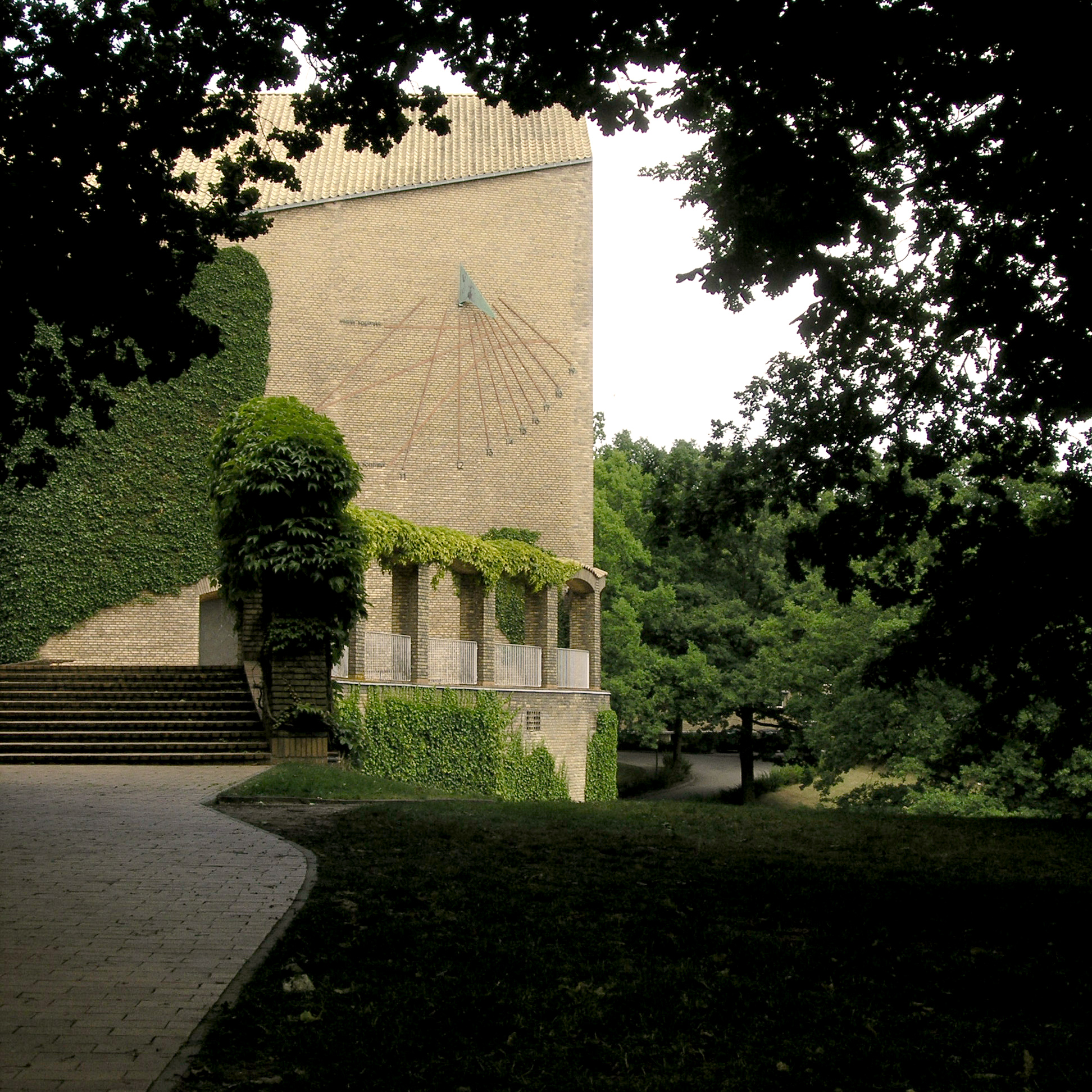
Main Building (1946)

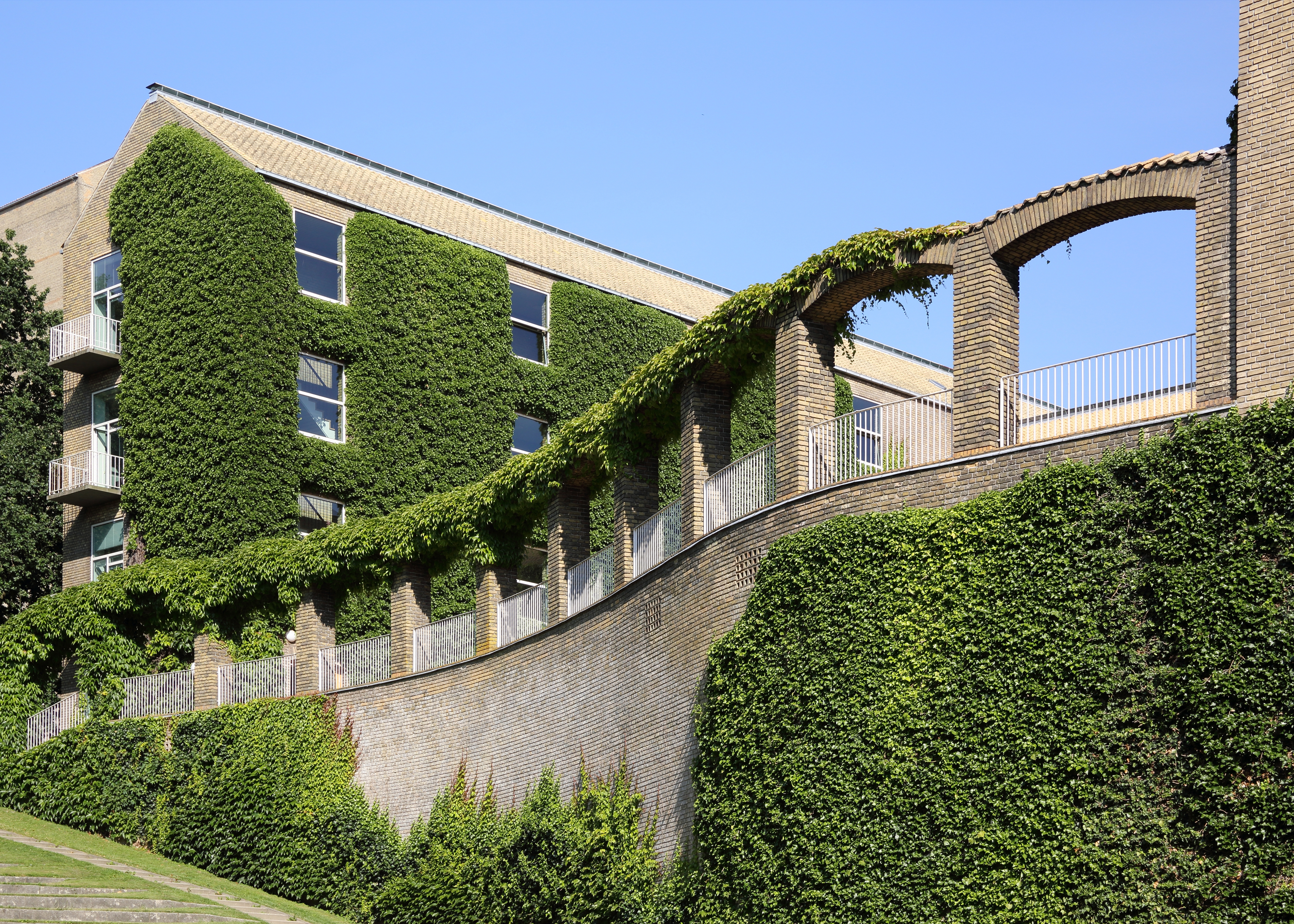
Main Building, brick colonnades

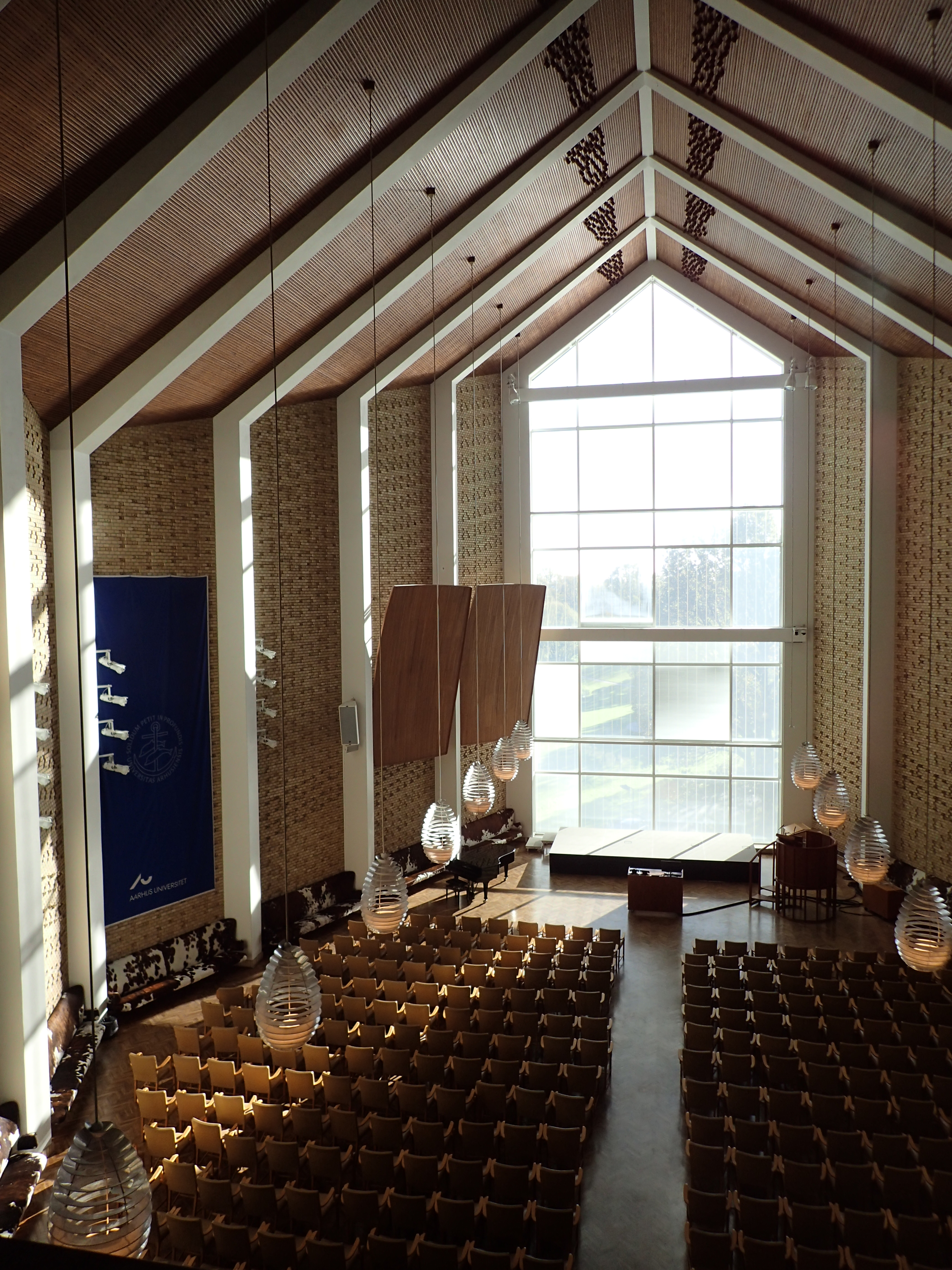
Auditorium, Main Building

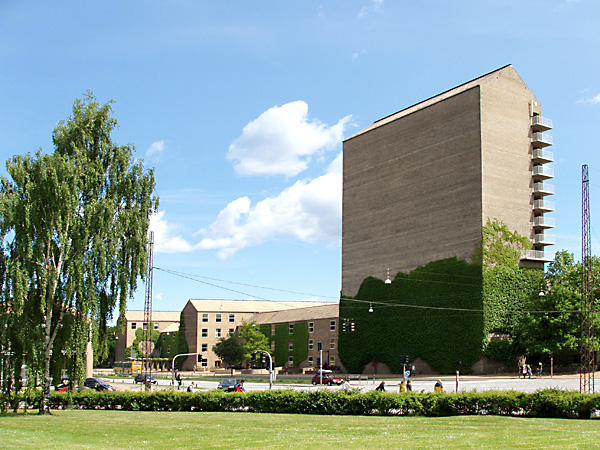
The Book Tower of the State Library (1960–63)

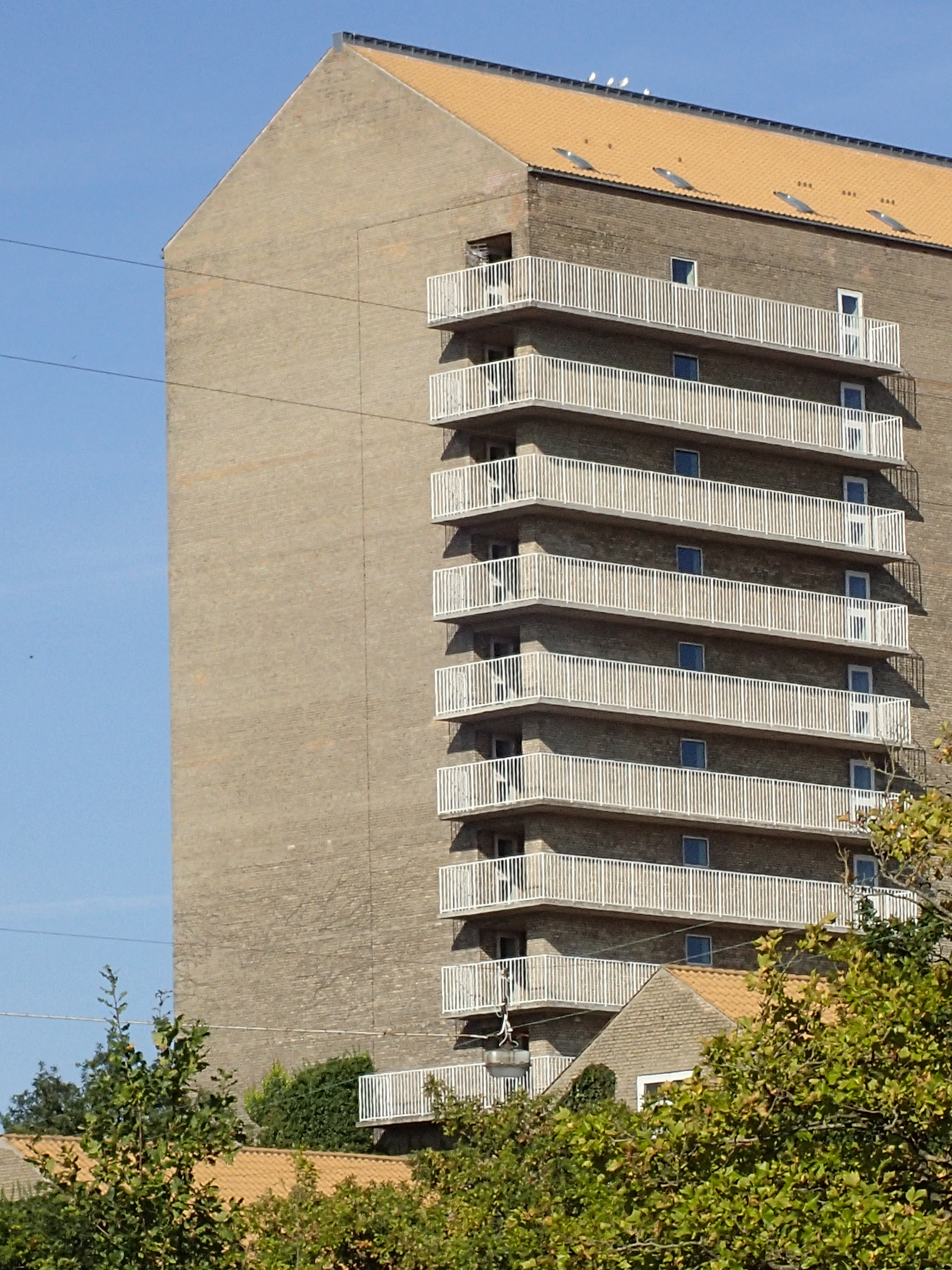
The Book Tower

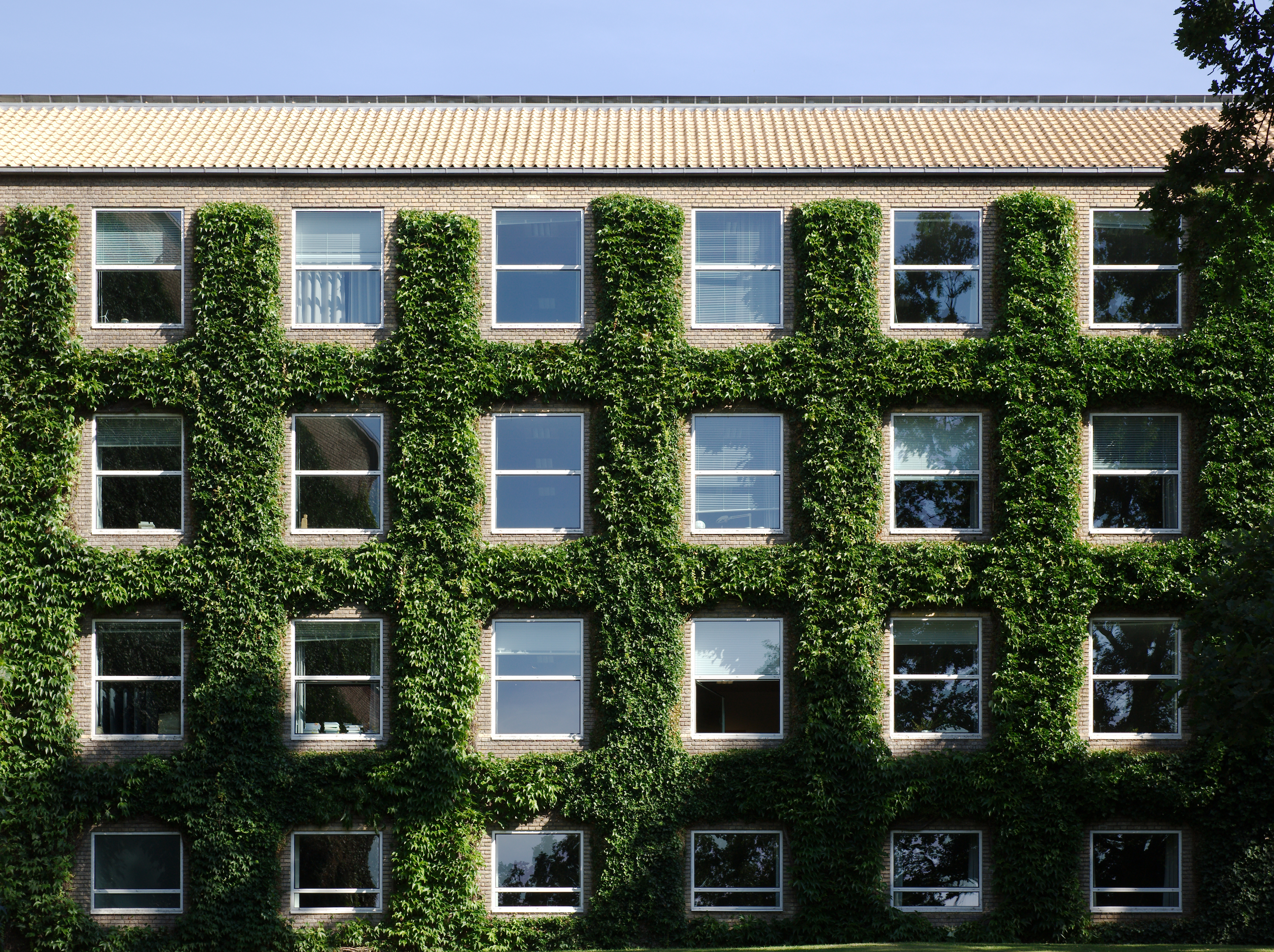
Typical facade

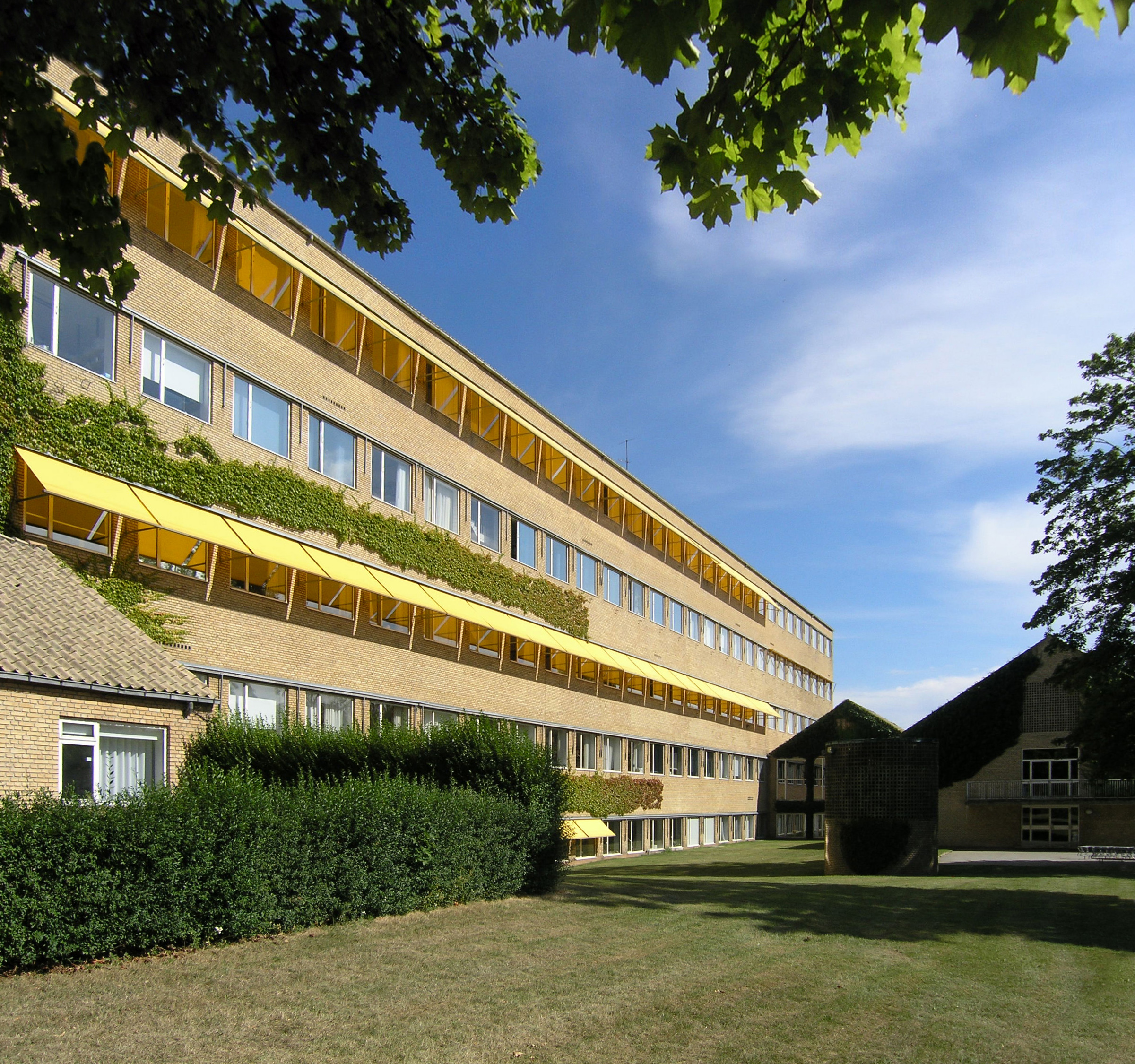
Typical facade (1974)

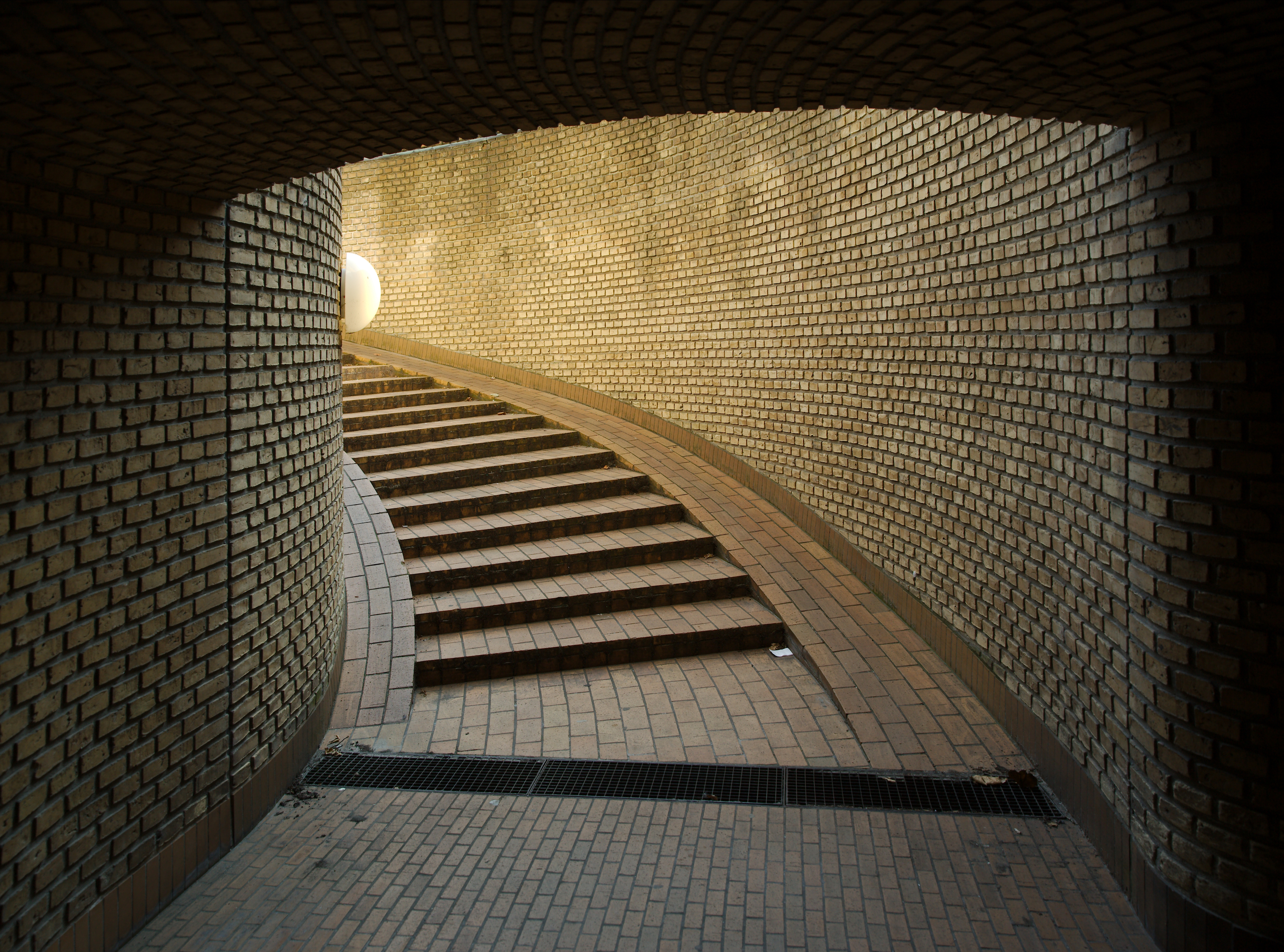
Details of an underground pathway (1946)

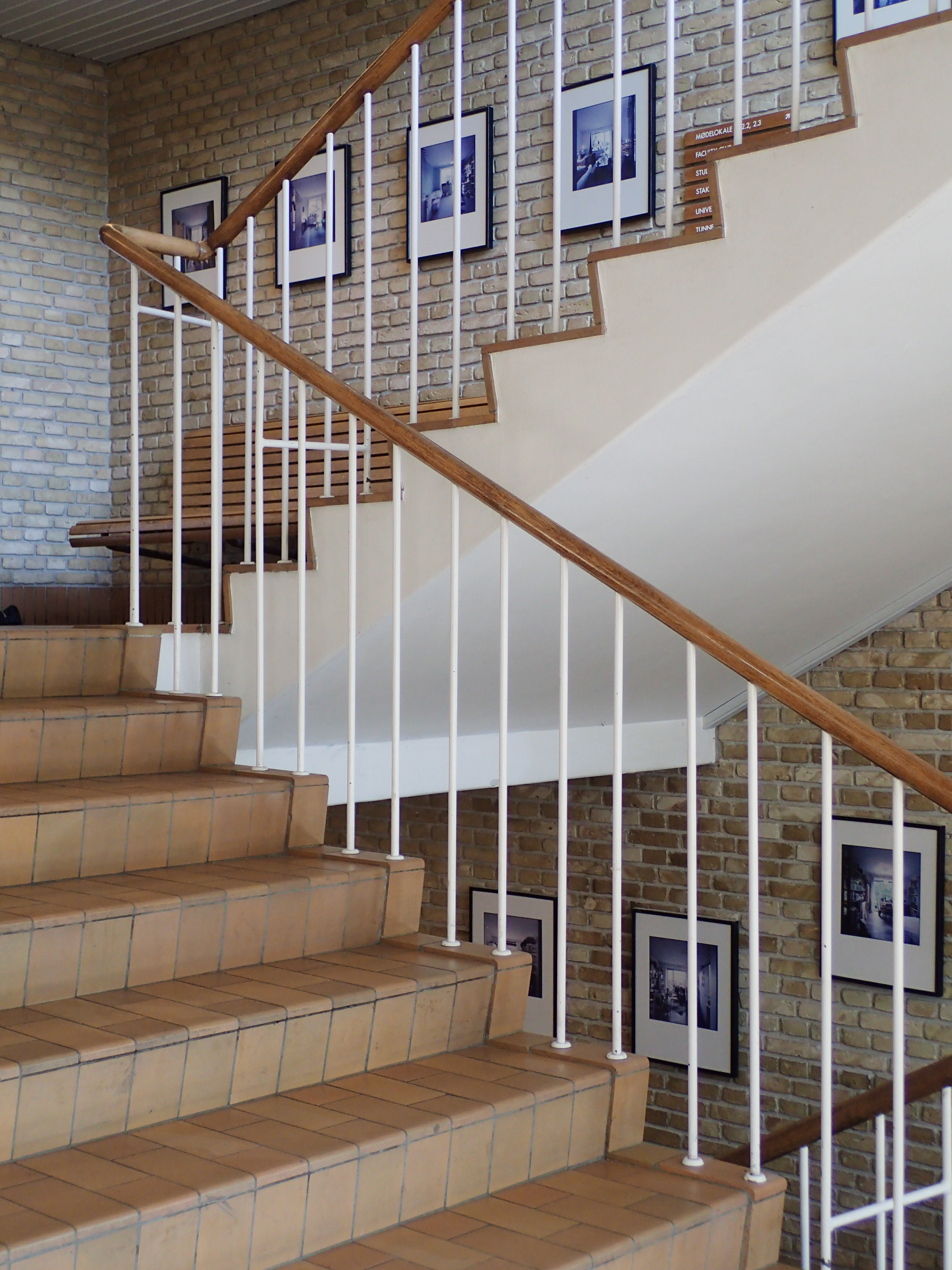
Stairway detail

Elsewhere

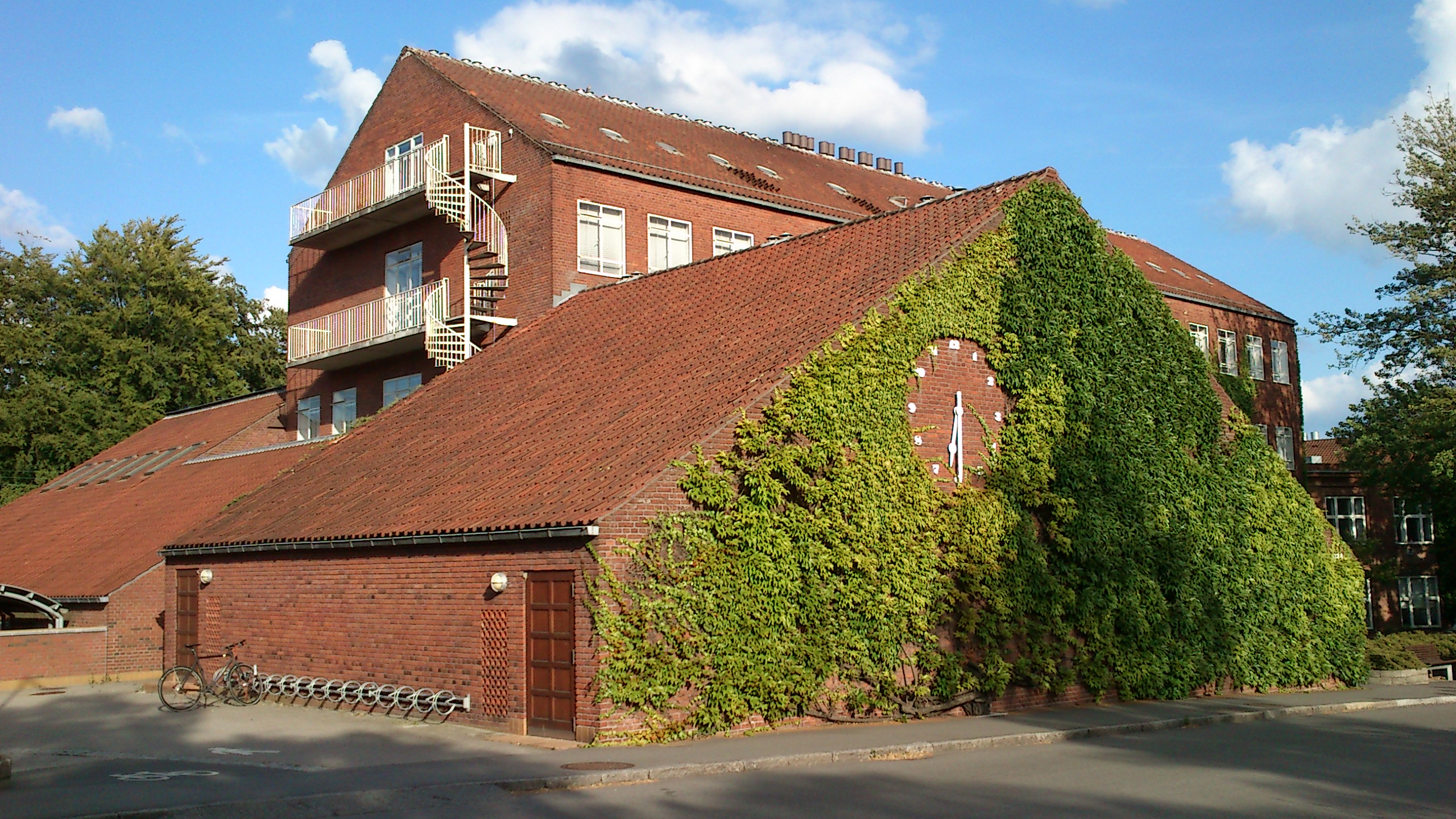
Arhus Community Hospital

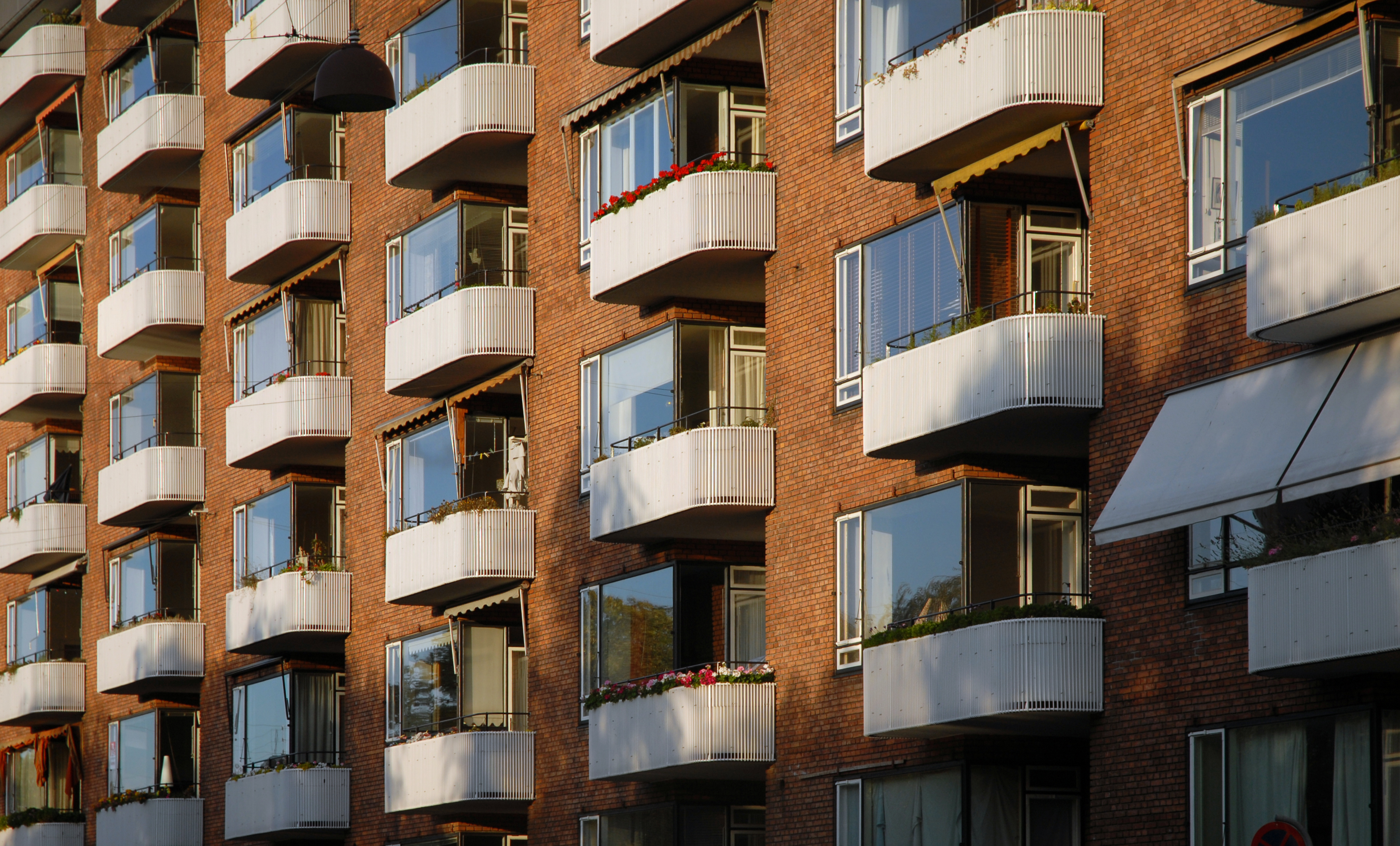
Functionalist apartments at Vestersøhus in Copenhagen

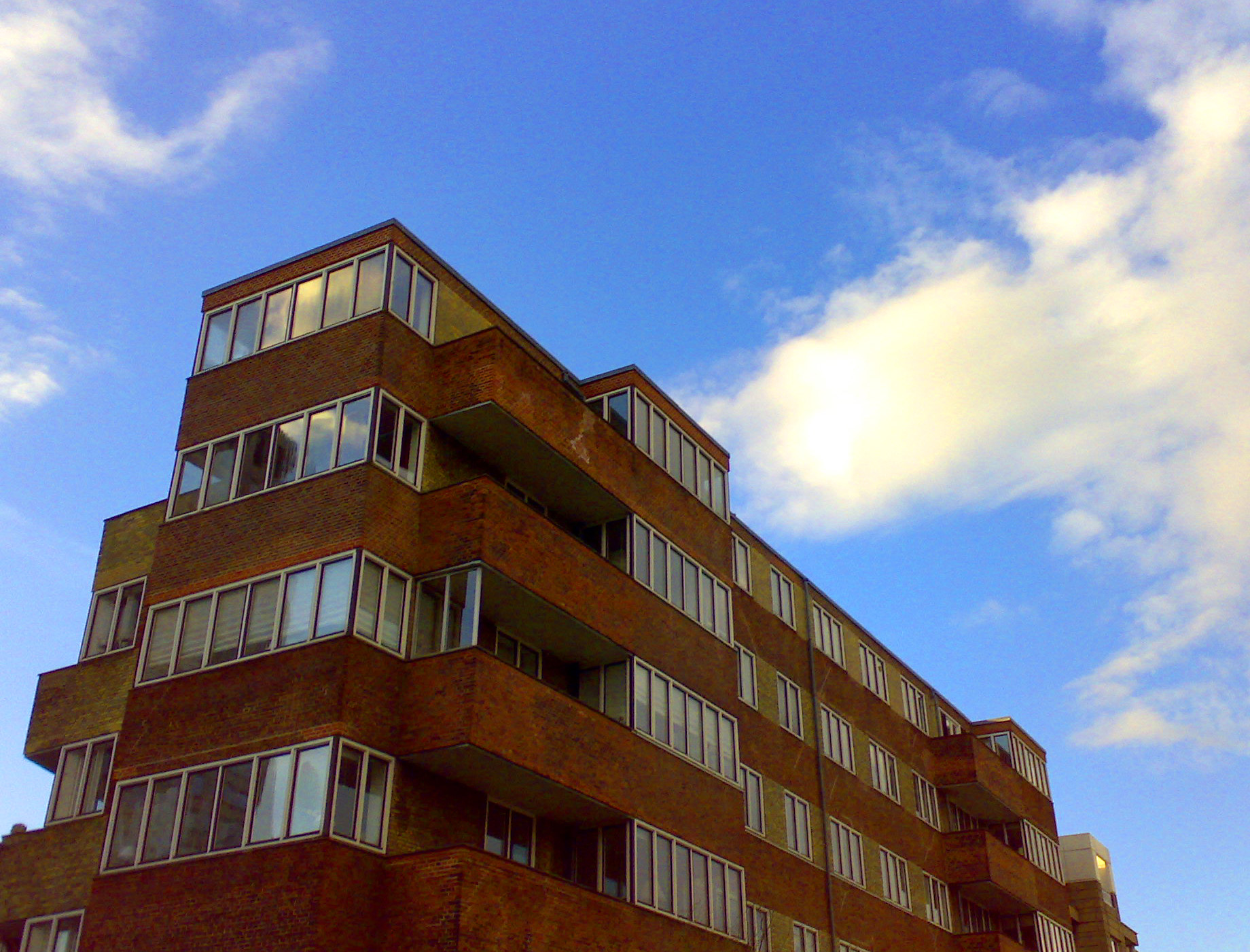
Vodroffsvej in Copenhagen, typical Danish funkis architecture

== See also ==
- Architecture of Denmark
