= Skindergade 32 =

Listed building in Copenhagen

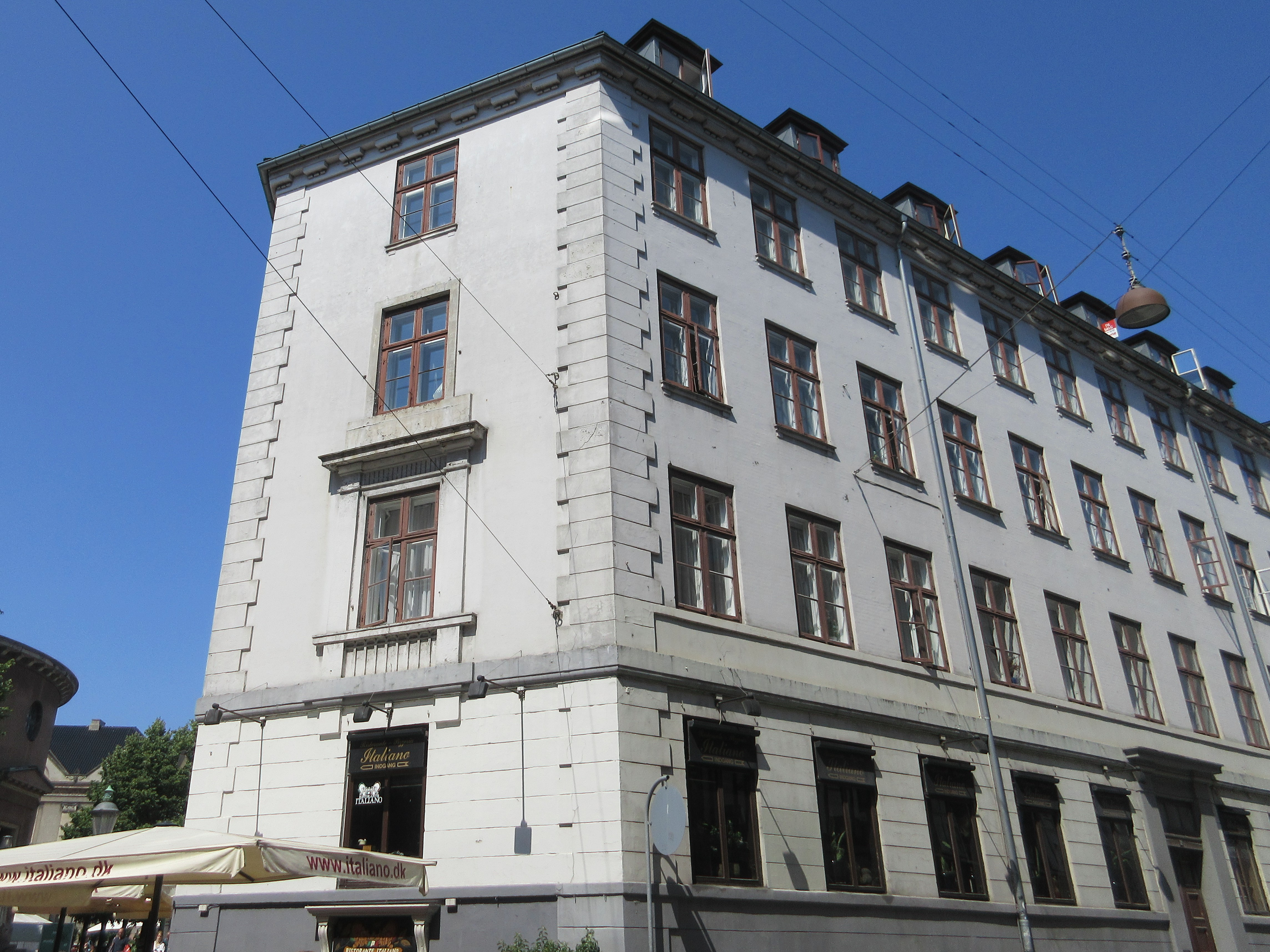
- Interactive map of the Skindergade 32 area

General information
- Architectural style: Neoclassical
- Location: Copenhagen, Denmark
- Coordinates: 55°40′46″N 12°34′27″E
- Completed: 1838

Skindergade 32/Fiolstræde 2 is a Neoclassical apartment building situated at the acute corner of Skindergade and Fiolstræde in the Old Town of Copenhagen, Denmark, designed and constructed by master mason Thomas Blom in 1837–38 as his last independent work. He went with a somewhat outdated Neoclassical style, undoubtedly to make the building blend in with Christian Frederik Hansen's Trøstens Boliger, Church of Our Lady and Metropolitan School on three adjacent sites. The building was listed in the Danish registry of protected buildings and places in 1945. Notable former residents include the mathematician Christian Ramus, judge and later professor of law at the University of Copenhagen Tage Algreen-Ussing, lawyer Lars Christian Larsen, director of the Zealand Railway Company Viggo Rothe and bookseller and publisher G.E.C. Gad.

== History ==
=== Site history, 1578–1824 ===
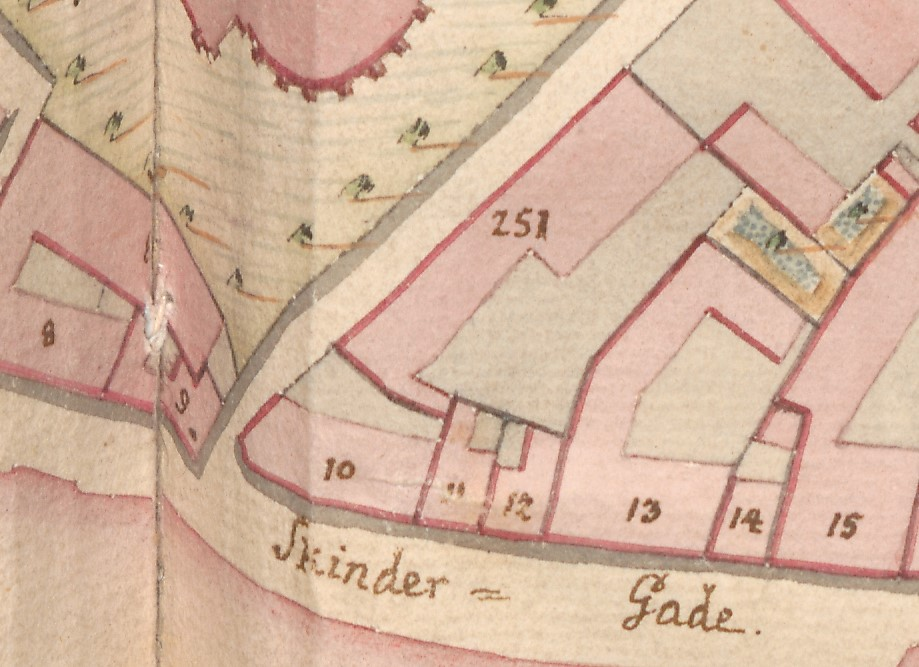
No. 10–12 seen in a detail from Christian Gedde's map of Klædebo Quarter, 1757

The site was formerly made up of three smaller properties, listed as No. 12, No. 13 and No. 14 in Klæødebo Quarter in Copenhagen's first cadastre of 1689. The old No. 12 was listed as No. 10 in the new cadastre of 1756 and belonged to one Daniel Paulli's widow at that time. The old No. 13 was listed as No. 11 and belonged to glovemaker Gert Smidt. The old No. 14 was listed as No. 12 and belonged to Jacob Zachariasen Krener.

The three properties were listed in the new cadastre of 1806 with the same cadastral numbers as in the old cadastre of 1756. No. 10 belonged to one Sivertsen's widow. No. 11 belonged to Christian Aasted. No. 12 belonged to master tailorLars N. Ager. The three buildings were all destroyed in the British bombardment of Copenhagen in 1807. The British troops aimed for the Church of Our Lady, and the area around the church was therefore particularly hard hit by the assault. The three fire sites were subsequently left empty for many years.

=== Thomas Blom and the new building ===
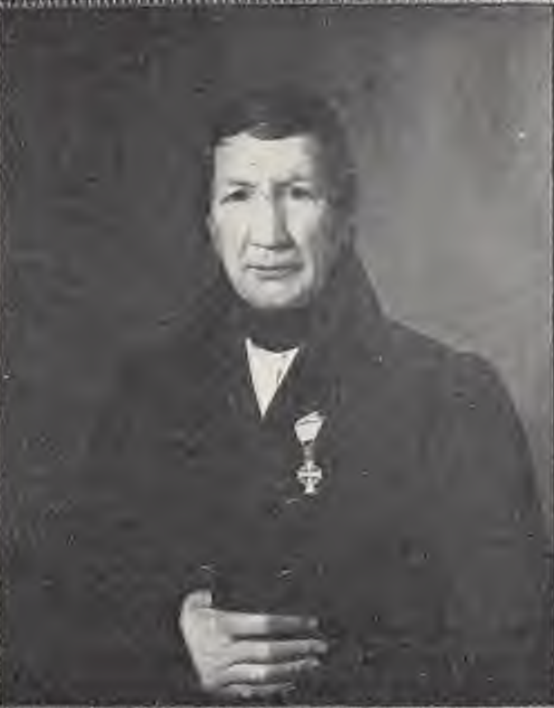
Thomas Blom

In 1837 the three small fire sites were acquired by the master mason Thomas Blom and merged into a single property. He had for many years worked on the rebuilding of the Church of Our Lady as well as on Christiansborg Palace (burnt in 1794). More recently, in 18–36, he had constructed the three buildings at Fiolstræde 19–23. The building now known as Skindergade 32 was constructed by him in 1837–38. He kept the building until his death but did not himself live in it. He and his family resided in an apartment at Kronprinsessegade 40, a building constructed by him in 1811.

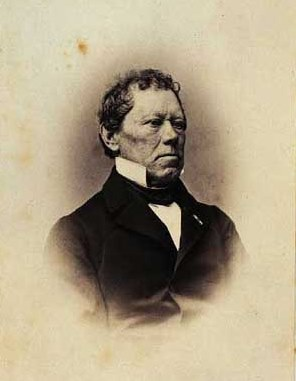
Tage Algreen-Ussing by Hermann Ohm

The property was home to a total of 55 residents in 10 households at the time of the 1840 census. Johanne Wilhelmine Sølling, widow of a clergyman, resided in one of the ground-floor apartments with her late husband's son Samuel Anton Sølling(in his first marriage) and niece Wilhelmine Christine Sølling as well as one maid. Henry Christian Gad, a policeman, resided in the other ground-floor apartment with his wife Ida Adolphine Wilhelmine Gad (née Bricien??), their two children (aged two and four), and two maids. Peder Blicher (1784-1864), a former farmer, resided in one of the first-floor apartments with his wife Dorthea Kirstine (née Kornbech), their 24-year-old daughter Meta Lovise Blicher, his mother-in-law Lovise Friis (née Haagensen, widow of captain Jens Nielsen Jornbech (died 1796, and merchant Hans Friis)), two lodgers (students) and one maid. Christian Ramus (1806-1856), a professor of mathematics at the University of Copenhagen, resided in the other first-floor apartment with his wife Sophie Lovise Charlotte Ramus (née Fistane), their two children (aged one and three), his sister-in-law Christiane Margrethe Fistaine and two maids. Tage Algreen-Ussing, a judge in Lands Over samt Hof og Stadsretten, resided in one of the second-floor apartments with his wife Frederikke Ottine Ussing (née Suenson), their four children (aged one to 10) and two maids. Frederik Nicolaj Berg, a surveyor with title of kammerråd, resided in the other second-floor apartment with his wife Ane Marie Berg (née Broge), two unmarried daughters (aged 32 and 34) and one maid. Charlotte Amalie Høegh, a widow with means, resided in one of the third-floor apartments with one maid. Magnus Urbanus Synnestvedt (1784-1843), inspector of Copenhagen Water Services, resided in the other third-floor apartment with his four children (aged 16 to 26) and two maids. Peer Nielsen, proprietor of a tavern in the basement, resided in the associated dwelling with his wife Mariane Christensen and one servant. Cristen Empecher (1808-1871), a master shoemaker, resided in the other half of the basement with his wife Julie Kirstline, their two-year-old daughter Constance Caroline Marie Empechse, his mother-in-law Catrine Friis and two shoemakers (employees).

Christian Ramus (1806-1856) moved in 1845. His next home was at Nørre Voldgade 50. Tage Algreen-Ussing (1797-1872) moved in 1846. His next home was at Højbro Plads 4.

=== Ingebrog Blom and her tenants, 1841–1855 ===
Blom died in 1841. His widow Ingeborg Cathrine Blom (née Carstensen, 1793–1860) kept the building after his death.

The property was home to a total of 55 residents at the 1850 census. Viggo Rothe, technical director of the Zealand Railway Company, resided on the ground floor with his wife Martha Gustavia Rothe, their three-year-old daughter Charlotte Christine and two maids. Ernst Frederik Holstein, an army major and inspector of the Royal Danish Mail with title of chamberlain (kammerherre), resided on the second floor with his wife Ida Holstein and two maids. Lars Christian Larsen (1813-1873), a lawyer, resided on the second floor with his wife Luise Christine (née Helweg), their three children (aged two to five) and two maids. Adolf Christ. Meyer, a judge at Copenhagen's criminal court, resided on the second floor to the right with his wife Emilie Johanne Meyer, their 12-year-old son Wilhelm Heinrich Meyer, one lodger and two maids. Johannes Severin Westengaard, a banker, resided in the third-floor apartment to the left with his wife Hansine Westengaard, their two children (aged 20 and 23) and one maid. Peder Blicher, who now worked as a treasurer at the Metropolitan School, resided on the third floor to the left with his wife Dorthea Kerstine Blicher, his mother-in-law Lovise Friis, two lodgers and one maid. Emma Castenschiold (née Tissot, 1820–1886), who was the wife of army officer Henrik Castenschiold (1818-1908) (not mentioned in the census record, probably due to service elsewhere), resided on the third floor to the right with her two sons (aged one and four), two maids and one lodger. The shoemaker Christian Joseph Empscher was still residing in one half of the basement. He now lived there with his new wife Martine Amalie Nancy (née Hartmann), their three children (aged one to 11) and one shoemaker (employee). Franzeskus Pierri (1807-), a glazier born in Florence, resided in the other half of the basement with his wife Juliane Sophie Pierri, their seven children (aged three to 20) and one maid.

Viggo Rothe moved in 1854. His next home was at Vestergade 37.

=== Christian Jørgensen and his tenants ===
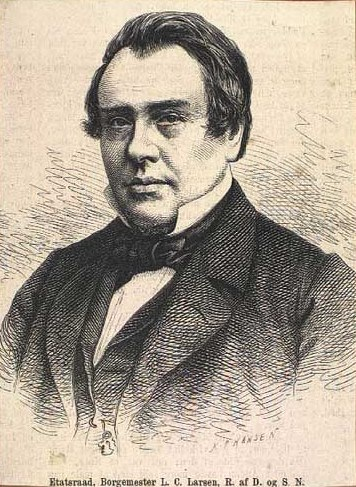
Lats Christian Larsen

In 1855, five years prior to her death, Ingeborg Blom sold the property to restaurateur Christian Jørgensen. He opened a café and billiard parlour on the ground floor. His property was home to a total of 53 residents at the time of the 1860 census. Christian Jørgensen occupied the first floor and one half of the ground floor. He lived there with his wife Anna Christine Jørgensen (née Reuther), two of their children (aged 19 and 29), four servants and the lodger Ludvig Alexander Rømeling Stricker. Simeon Nathan Kalkar, a merchant, resided in the other ground-floor apartment with his wife Emma Kalkar (née Libeschutz), their two children (aged one and two), one maid and one lodger. Ludvig Wilhelm Petersen, a bookkeeper, resided in the other first-floor apartment with his wife Dorthea Sophie Petersen (née Bruhn), their daughter Catharine Sophie Cecilie Petersen, his sister-in-law Chatarine Bruhn and one maid. The lawyer Lars Christian Larsen now occupied the entire second floor. He lived there with their wife, now their four sons (aged three to 13), his wife's niece Anna Sophie Helweg, 40-year-old Marie Frederikke Toxverd and three maids. The eldest son was the later lawyer H.F. Helweg-Larsen. Two of his younger brothers were the later military officer and writer Axel Liljefalk and the later clergy Vilhelm Helweg-Larsen. A fifth son, Christian Helweg-Larsen, born in October of the same year, would later serve as the last Governor-General of the Danish West Indies. Carl Albecht Cold (1824-1876), a judge at the Criminal Court, resided on the third floor to the right with his wife Apellonia Cold (née Foss), one maid and one male servant. Four women employed with needlework resided in the garret. Markus Jens Ludvig Lange, a garmer, resided on the third floor to the left with a housekeeper and a maid. Christian Hedegaard, a junk dealer, resided in the basement with his wife Charlotte Frederikke (née Poulsen) and their three children (aged 18 to 21). Christian Joseph Empacher, a master shoemaker, resided in the other half of the basement with his wife Enna Julie Albertine Empacher, their three children (aged eight to 11), one shoemaker (employee) and one maid.

G.E.C. Gad (1830-1906), a bookseller and publisher, founder of Gads Forlag, resided on the third floor from 1863 to 1865. His publishing house and bookshop was located on Vimmelskaftet. His next home was at Vimmelskaftet 32.

=== 20th century ===
Universitetscaféen, a café popular with students, was for many years based on the first floor. It existed from at least the 1940s and into the 1960s.

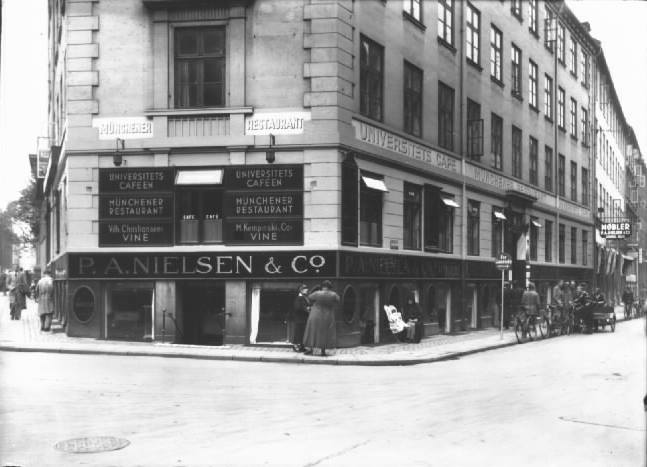

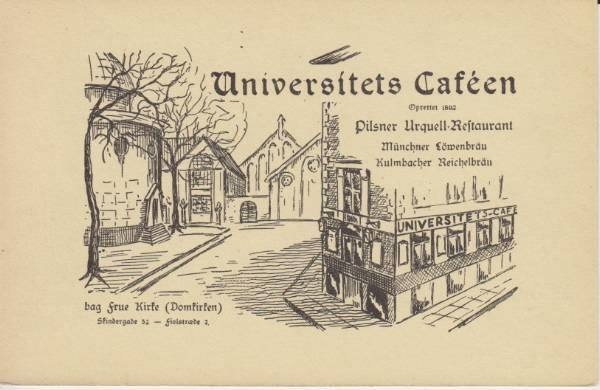
Advert for Universitetscaféen

== Architecture ==
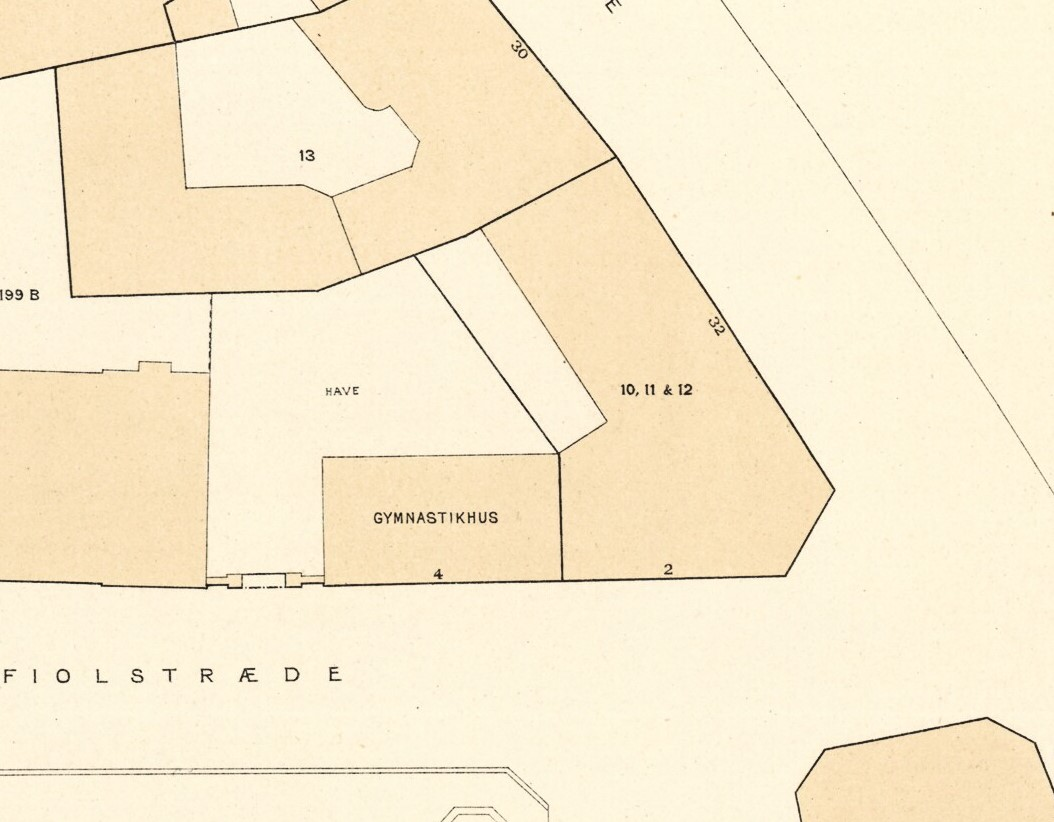
Skindergade 32 seen in a detail from one of Berggreen's block plans of Klædebo Quarter, 1886-88

Thomas Blom had followed Caspar Frederik Harsdorff's evening programmes for craftsmen at the Royal Danish Academy of Fine Arts. Skindergade 32 does, however, stand out from Blom's other buildings as being more influenced by Christian Frederik Hansen's Classicism than Harsdordd's lighter Neoclassicism. This was undoubtedly done to make the building blend in with Hansen's three adjacent buildings: Trøstens Boliger, Church of Our Lady and Metropolitan School in its immediate environs.

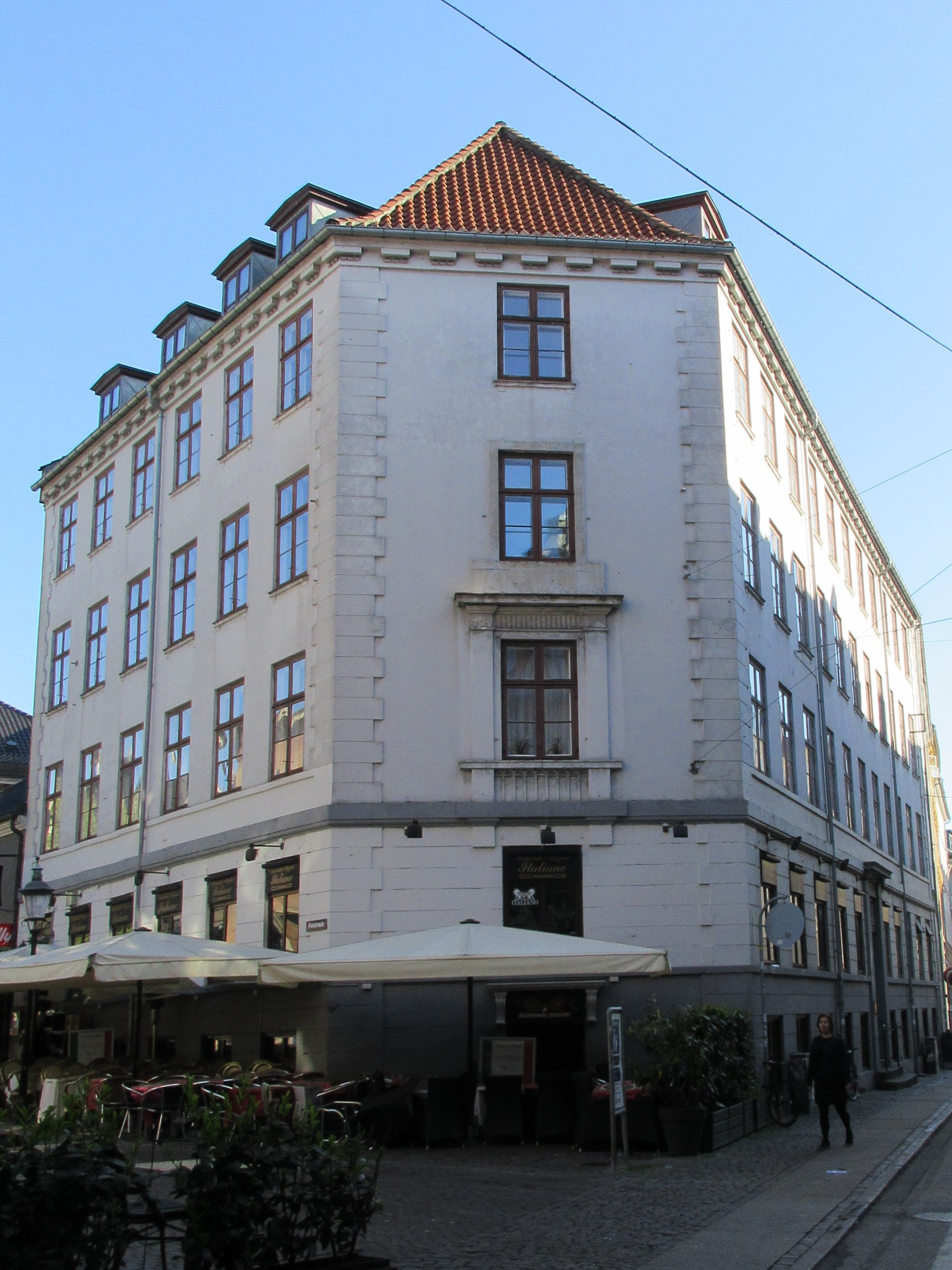
Skindergade 32

Skindergade 32 is an acute corner building constructed with four storeys over a walk-out basement. It has an 11-bays-long principal facade towards Skindergade, a six-bays-long secondary facade towards Diolstræde and a chamfered corner. The plastered facade is on the ground floor and an exposed part of the basement is finished with shadow joints. The exposed part of the basement is painted in a dark grey colour while the rest of the building is painted in a pale grey colour. The upper part of the facade is finished with a sill course below the first-floor windows and a modillioned cornice. The corners of the building are accented with quoins. The second-floor corner window is accented with sandstone framing as well as a hood mould supported by corbels. The main entrance of the building is situated in the centre of the facade towards Fuikstrlde. It is also topped by a hood mould. The pitched roof, which is shaped as a mansard roof towards the yard, is clad in red tile. The roof ridge is pierced by three chimneys. The 11 dormer windows that facade the street were added in the 1850s.

== Today ==
The property is owned by Ejd Skindergade 32 I/S. It contains two apartments on each of the upper floors. The basement is now part of Restaurant Italiano at Fiolstræde 4.

== Gallery ==
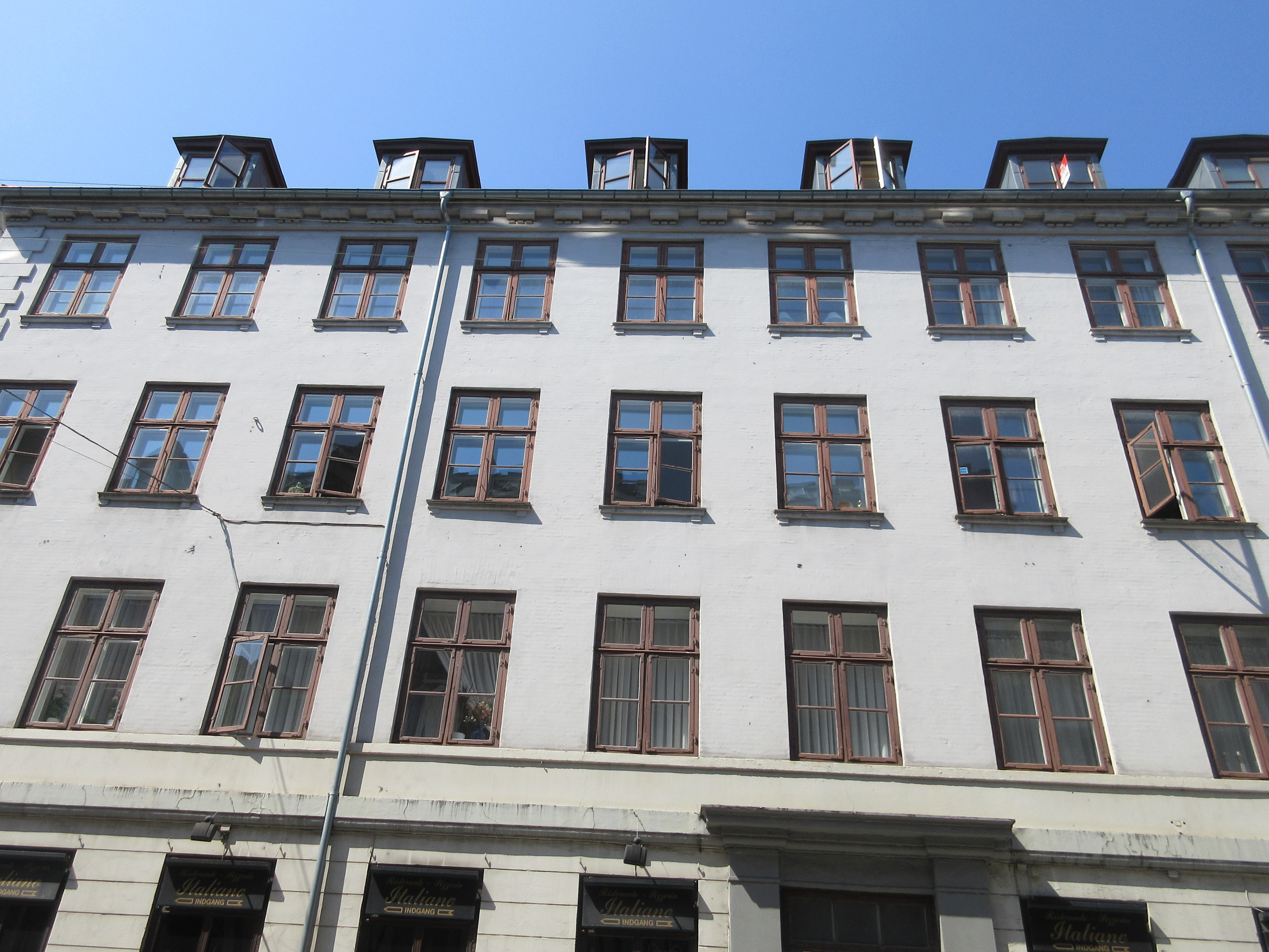
The facade viewed from Skindergade

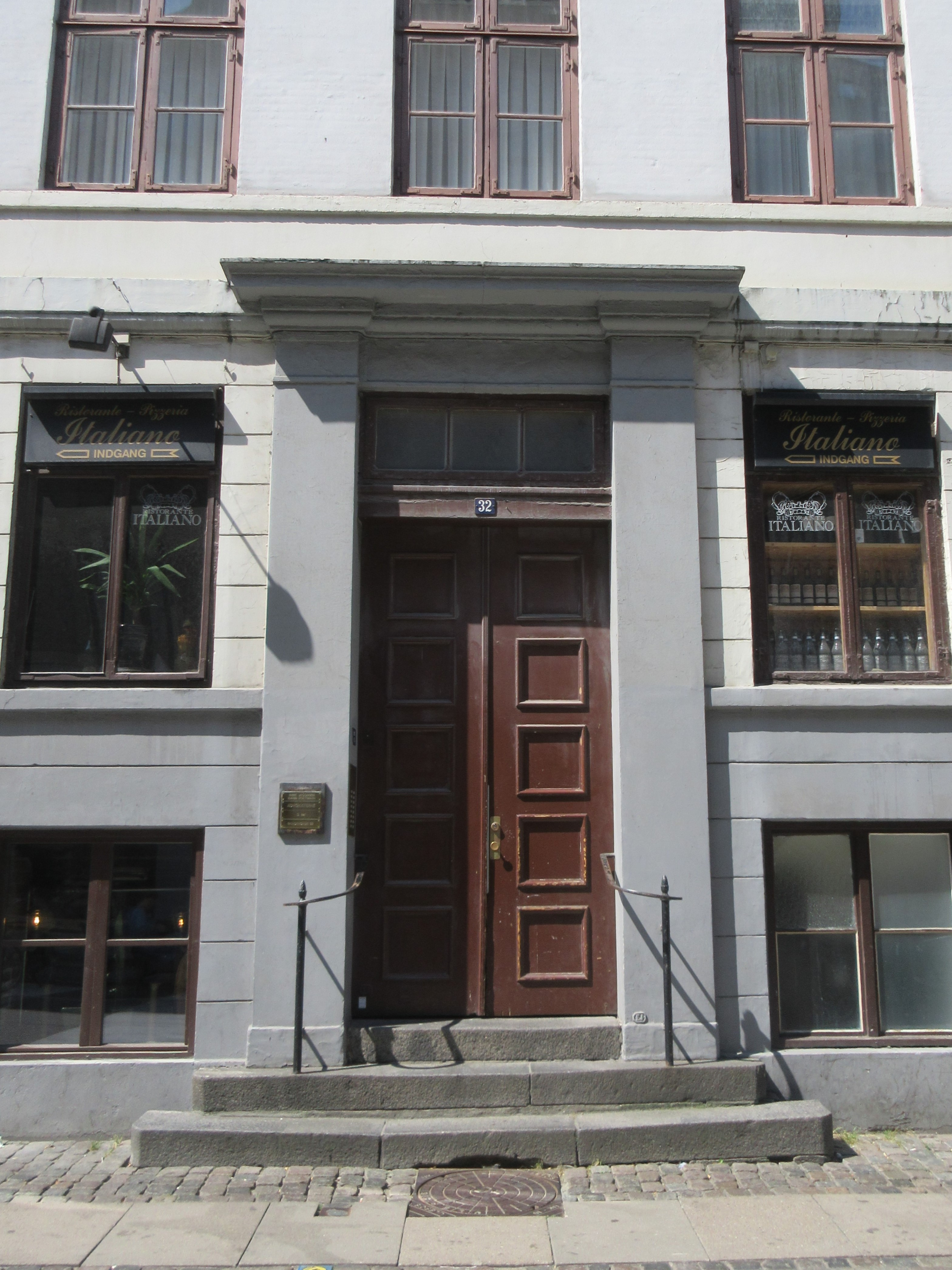
The main entrance

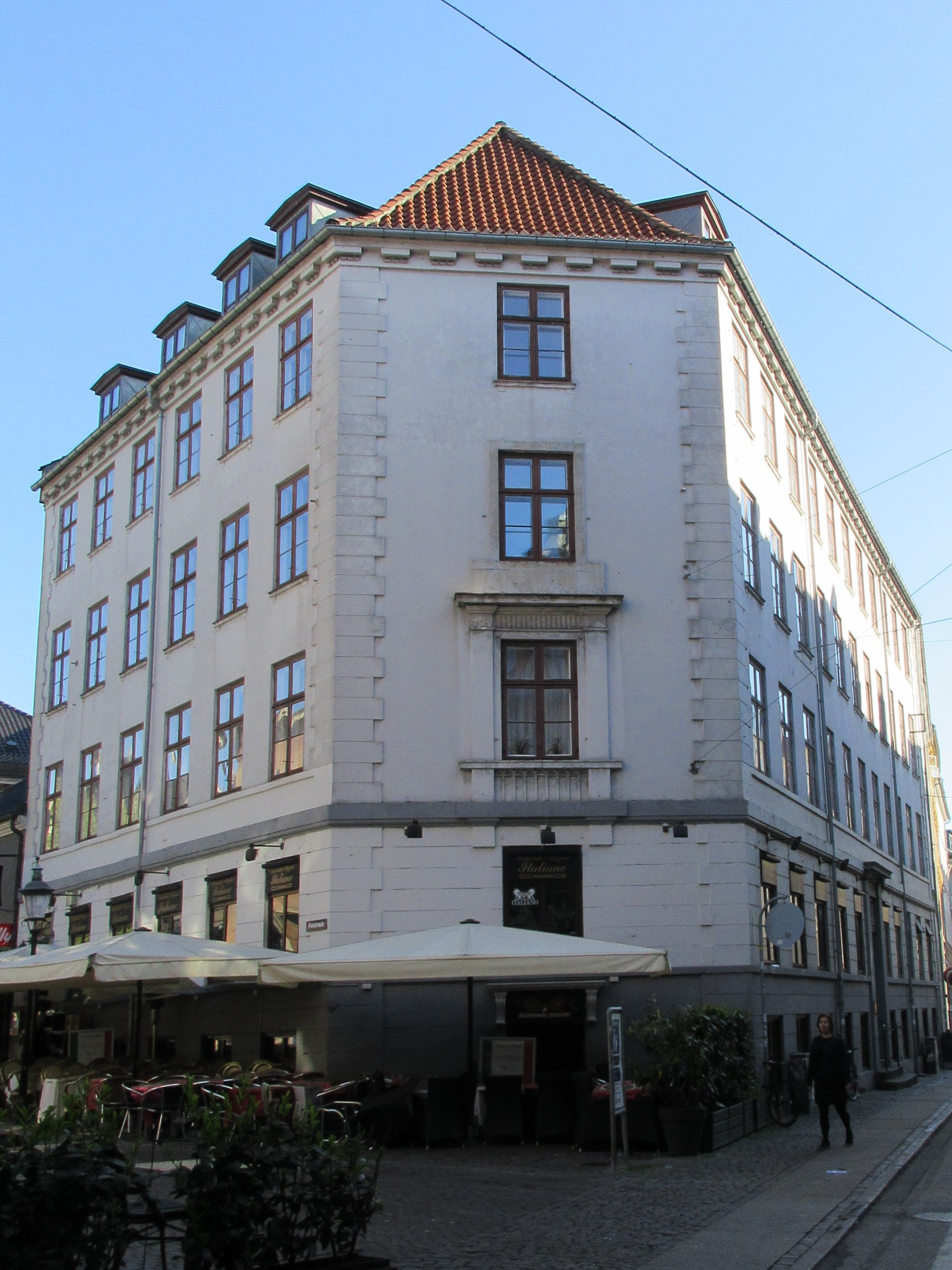
The chamfered corner

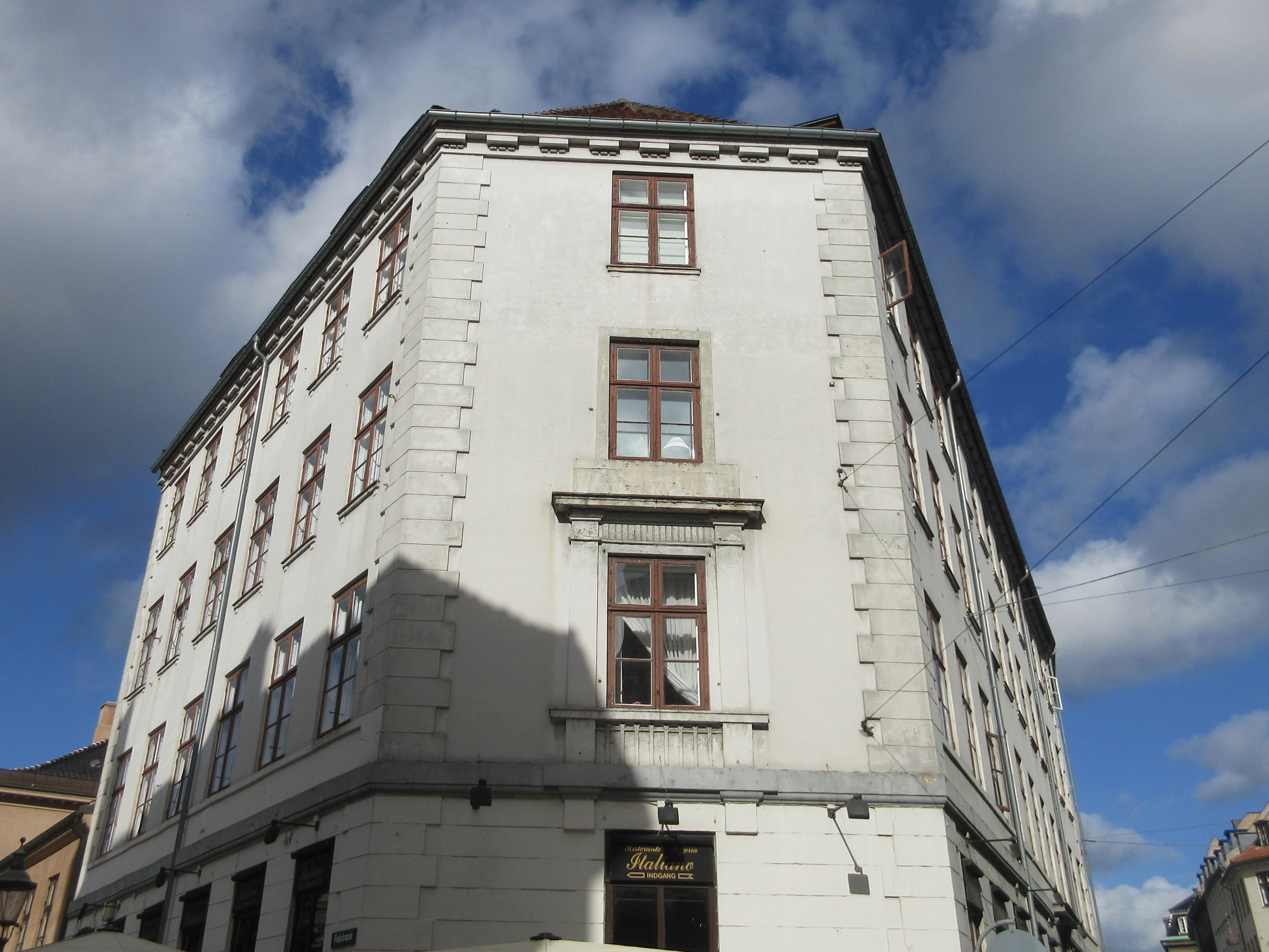
Skindergade 32

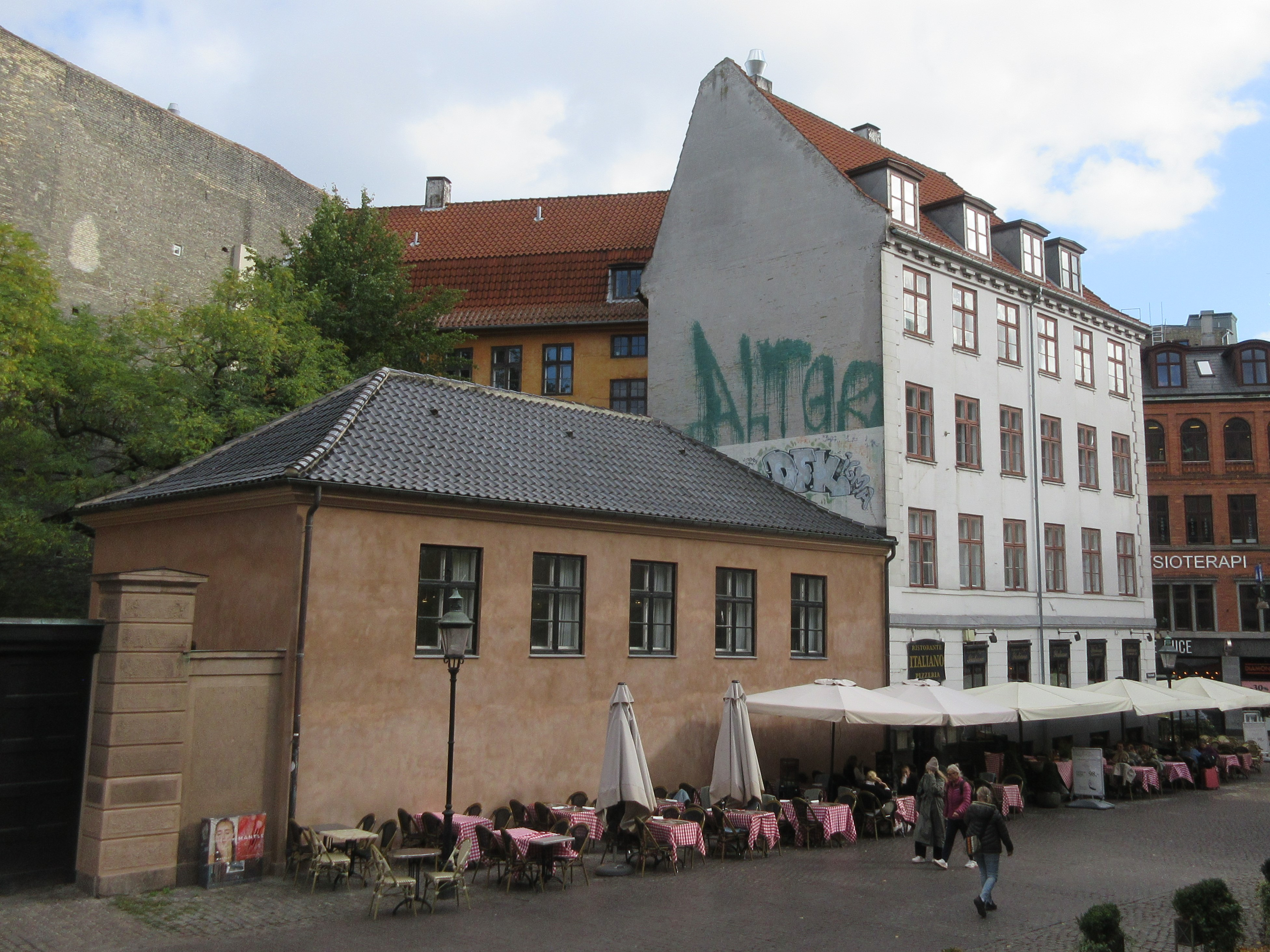
The building viewed from Fiolstræde. The mansard roof towards the yard is just visible above the low building.
