= Gråbrødretorv 12 =

Historical building in Copenhagen, Denmark

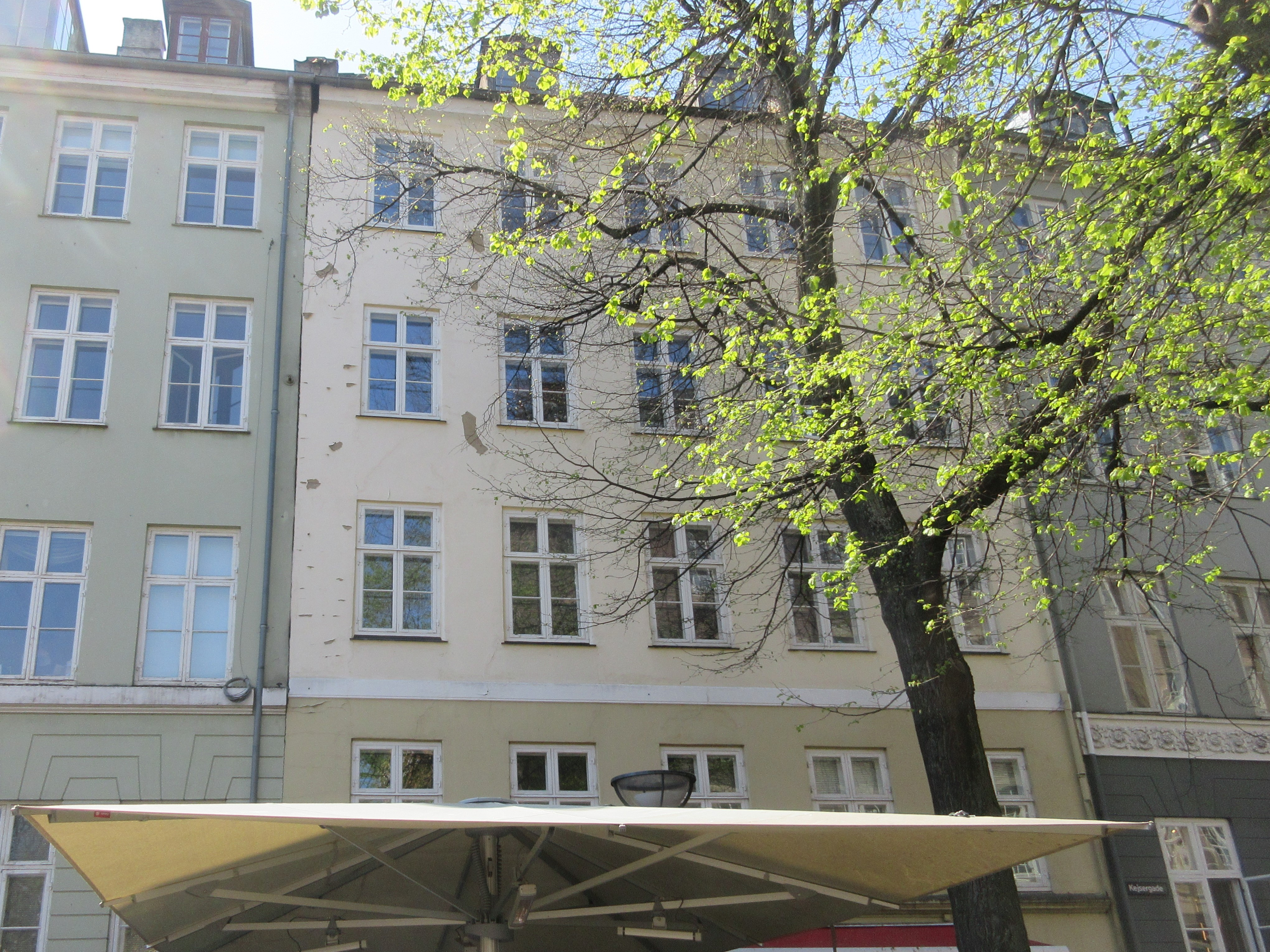
- Interactive map of the Gråbrødretorv 12 area

General information
- Location: Copenhagen, Denmark
- Coordinates: 55°40′47.6″N 12°34′31.12″E
- Completed: 1813
- Renovated: 1816 (expanded)

Gråbrødretorv 12 is a property situated on the west side of Gråbrødretorv in the Old Town of Copenhagen, Denmark. Like the other buildings on the west side of the square, the building was constructed after the British bombardment of Copenhagen in 1807. It was listed in the Danish registry of protected buildings and places in 1845. Former residents include pioneer of Swedish gymnastics Pehr Henrik Ling, civil servant and art collector Christian Frederik Holm and chief physician Rudolph Bergh.

== History ==
=== 18th century ===
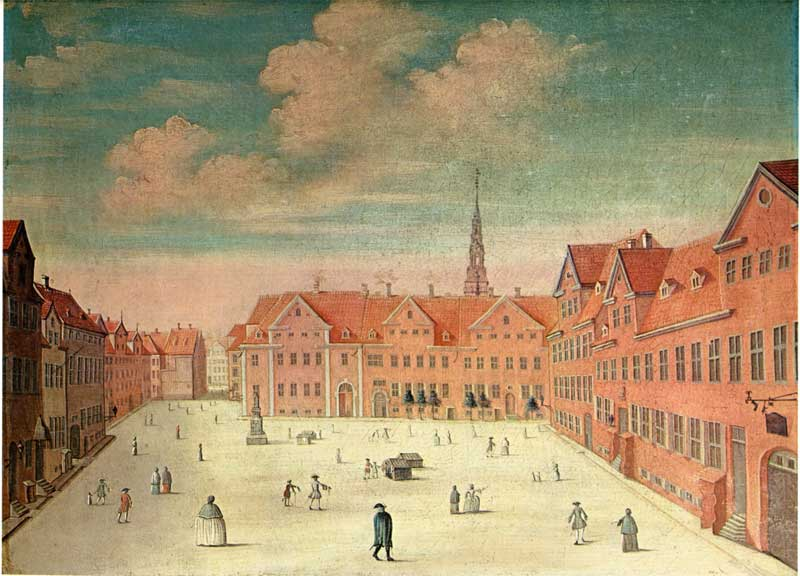
The west side of the square in 1748, painting by Johannes Rach

In 1689, the site was part of a larger property which occupied the entire west side of the square. It was listed as No. 125 in Frimand's Quarter owned by Krigsråd Mejer's widow and consisted of four tenancies. The property was divided into three smaller properties after the Copenhagen Fire of 1728. They were built over with three more-or-less identical two-storey houses, each of them with a facade crowned by a large, three-bay gabled wall dormer, based on one of Johan Cornelius Krieger's standard designs created for the rebuilding of the city after the fire.

The property now known as Gråbrødretorv 12 was listed in 1756 as No. 114 in Frimand's Quarter, owned by shoemaker Peder Mortensen.

=== 19th century ===
At the time of the 1801 census, the property was home to a total of 30 people distributed among six households. Poul Thoring Holm, a clerk working for Auditor-General Søren Engelbreth, resided in the building with his wife Anne Maria Theistrup, mother-in-law Anne Margrethe Theistrup, son Christian Frederik Holm, niece Anne Thomine Krogstrup, three lodgers and a maid. Their son Christian Frederik Holm (1796–1879) would later become a high-ranking civil servant in the Ministry of Finance and an active member of Kunstforeningen as well as Musikforeningen. He would marry Marie Elisabeth Engelbrecht, granddaughter of his father's former boss. One of the three lodgers was Swedish language student and tutor Pehr Henrik Ling. Lauritz Halberg, a clerk working for Kammeraad Kellermann, resided in another apartment with his wife Maren Sørensen, a maid and four lodgers. A third household consisted of the widowed innkeeper Mette Maria Hostrup, her son Peder Hostrup and a maid. The fourth household consisted of saddler Gotfried Tickler, his wife Inger Maria Delig and maid Beate Delig (the wife's niece). The fifth household consisted of innkeeper Hans Nicolaus Drieberg, his wife Maren Hansen and their daughter Dorothea Drieberg. The last household consisted of innkeeper Morten Nielsen, his wife Anne Christensen, their two daughters (aged 11 and 16) and a lodger.

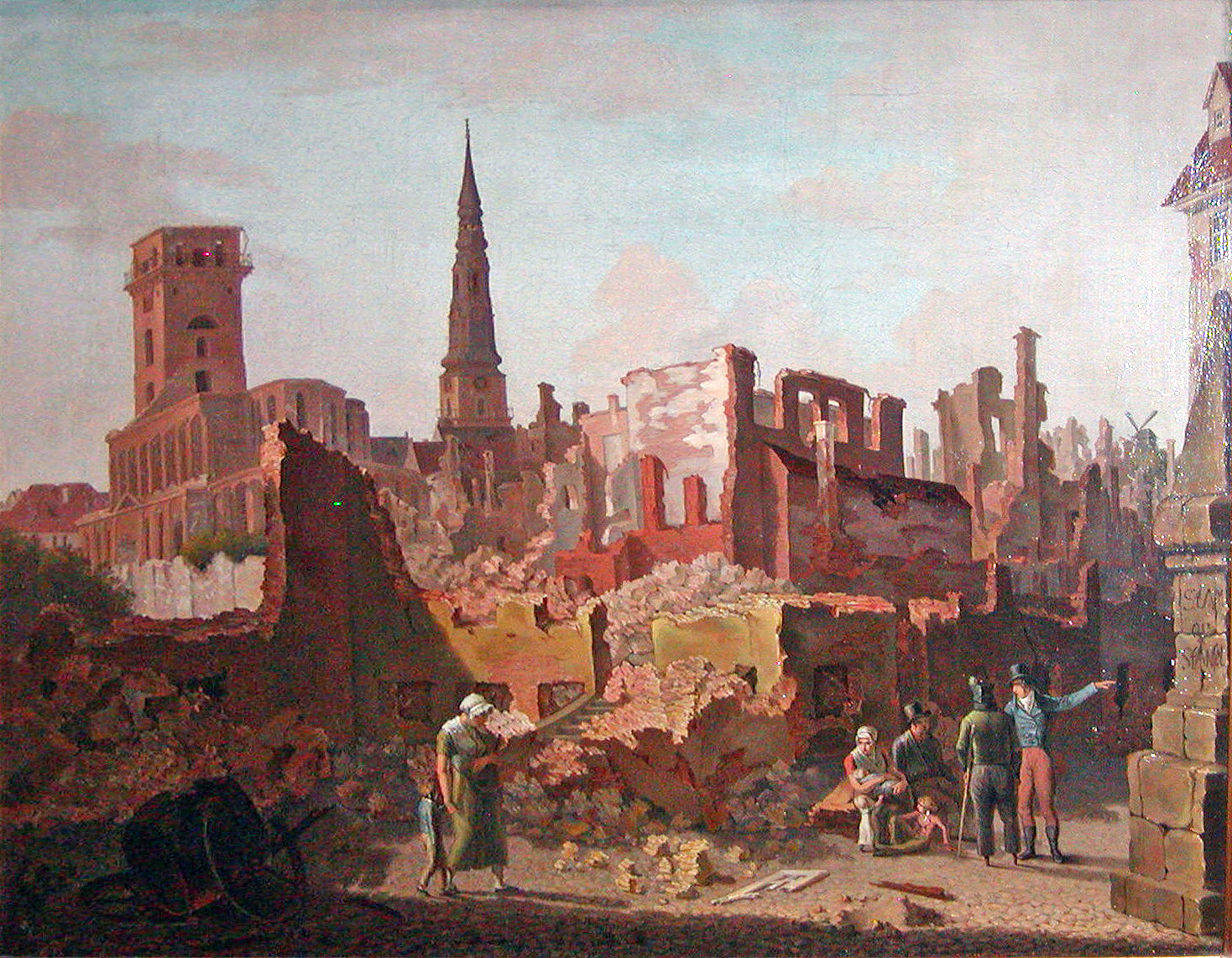
The west side of the square after the Battle of Copenhagen in 1807

The property was listed as No. 97 in the new cadastre of 1806. It was owned at the time by "Søren Theistrup's widow": the aforementioned mother-in-law Anne Margrethe Theistrup, whose late husband was Søren Pedersen Theistrup. The building was the following year together with the other buildings on the west and north sides of the square destroyed in the British bombardment of Copenhagen.

A three-storey building was constructed on the site in 1813 for a "lieutenant Tuxen". Brothers and naval officers Peter Mandrup Tuxen and Nicolai Henrik Tuxen both held the rank of lieutenant in the Royal Danish Navy in 1813. Peder Mandrup Tuxen had however been appointed as inspector at Orlogsværftet in 1811 and from then on, and for the next 28 years, resided in an official residence at Old Dock in Christianshavn. The building was constructed by Hans Ole Blom. He had collaborated with his mother and three brothers in the beginning of his career as Bloms Enke & Sønner (Blom's Widow & Sons"). The collaboration had been discontinued following the death of the eldest brother, Peder Blom, in 1807. Ole Blom was licensed as a master mason in 1812, allowing him to undertake independent construction projects for others. In 1816, he was commissioned to expand the building at Gråbrødretorv 12 by two storeys. He seems only to have built this one building. He later worked on the rebuilding of Christiansborg Palace.

The property was home to a total of 28 people at the time of the 1840 census.

Niels Christian Møller, a master bookbinder, resided in the ground-floor apartment with his wife Cathrine Marie née Christensen, their son Lars Christian Ludvig Møller and four employees (two of them apprentices). Margrethe Magdalene Norviile (1807–1846), a 33-year-old widow who would two years later marry Frederik Siegfried, Count Rantzau of Rosenvold, resided with a maid in the apartment on the first floor. Ludvig Anton Berg (1793–1853), a military surgeon and later chief physician, resided on the second floor with his wife Ane Sophie Christine née Petersen, their five children, a niece and a maid. The eldest of the four sons was the future physician and zoologist Rudolph Bergh. Karen Løfgreen, the 58-year old widow of a businessman (grosserer), resided on the third floor with her three unmarried children, a lodger and a maid.

The building was home to a total of 27 people at the time of the 1860 census. Marie Catrine Møller had now become a widow. She shared the apartment with her son Lars Christian Møller and his wife Fransiska Møller, their three children and a maid. Karen Løfgren was also still living in the building with her two children and a maid. Moritz Trier, a physician, resided in the building with his wife Susanne Trier, their one-year-old daughter, a wet nurse and a maid. Salomon Meyer, a broker, resided on the third floor with his wife, their four children and a maid. Ferdinand and Margrethe Birch resided with their two children in the side wing.

== Architecture ==
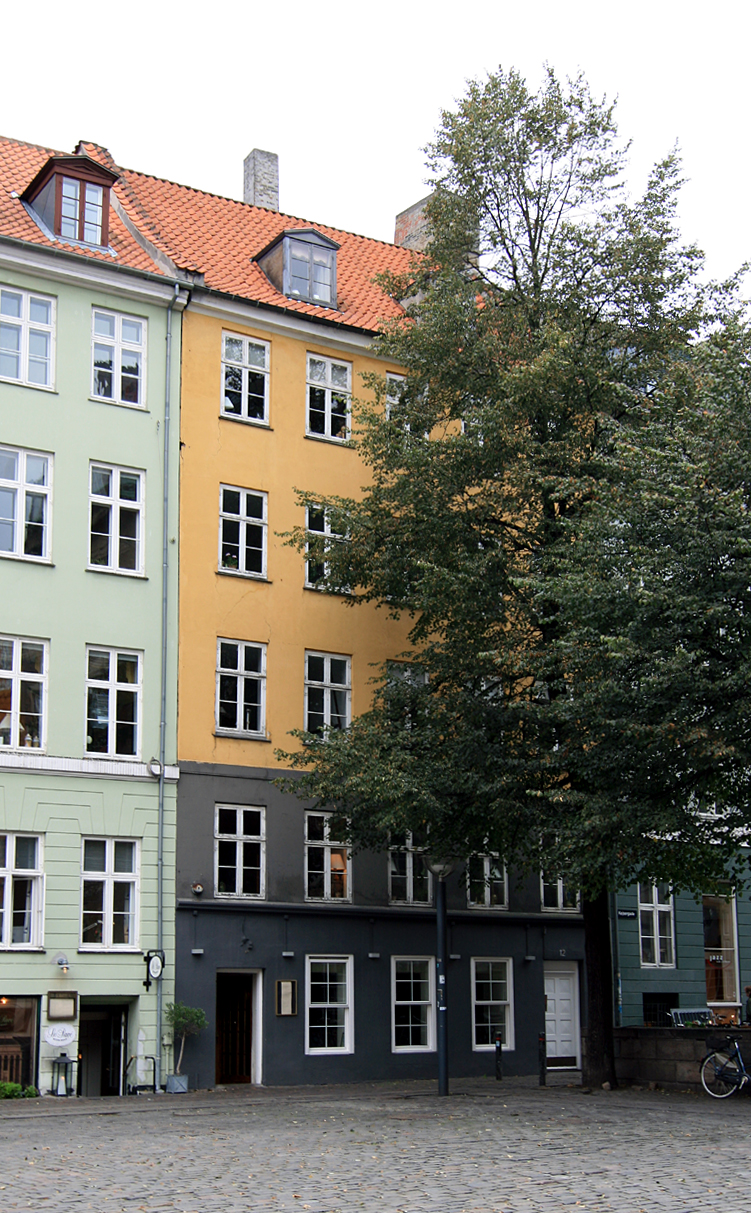
Gråbrødretorv 12.

Gråbrødretorv 12 is constructed with four storeys over a walk-out basement. The building is five bays wide and rendered in a dark grey colour on the ground floor and yellow on the upper floors. There is a plastered sill course below the ground floor windows, slate sills below the windows of the upper floors and a simple white-painted cornice below the roof. The main entrance is located in the bay furthest to the right and the basement entrance is located furthest to the left. The pitched roof is clad with red tile. A perpendicular wing extends from the rear side of the building.

== Today ==
The building is owned by E/F Matr.nr. 97 Frimands kvarter. It contains a restaurant in the basement and one condominium on each of the upper floors.
