= Kronprinsessegade 42 =

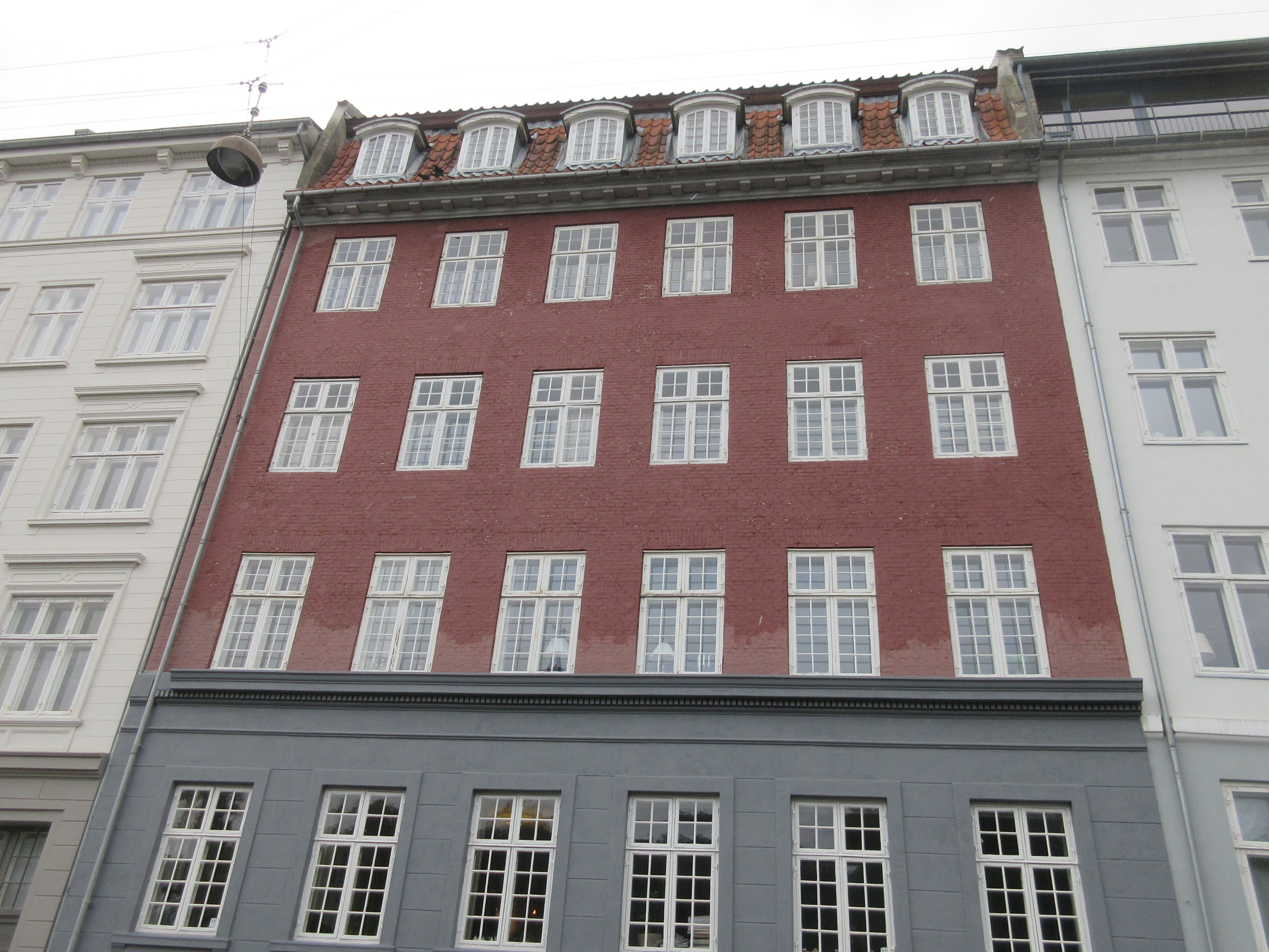
- Interactive map of the Kronprinsessegade 42 area

General information
- Location: Copenhagen, Denmark
- Coordinates: 55°41′6.14″N 12°34′58.52″E
- Completed: 1816

Design and construction
- Architect: Thomas Blom

Kronprinsessegade 42 is a Neoclassical property overlooking Rosenborg Castle Garden in central Copenhagen, Denmark. The building was listed in the Danish registry of protected buildings and places in 1945. Notable former residents include businessman Hans Puggaard, military officer and carteographer Jacob H. Mansa (1797-1885), military officer H. C. G. F. Hedemann (1792-1859), editor and politician Hother Hage (1816-1873) and clergy and politician Ditlev Gothard Monrad (1811-1887). Sacred Heart Of Jesus Chapel, a Catholic chapel operated by Jesuits, was located in the building from 1878 to 1883.

== History ==
=== Construction ===
Kronprinsessegade is one of the properties that was created when Kronprinsessegade was established in the years around 1800. The three first properties at the eastern corner of Dronningens Tværgade, initially referred to as Parcel No. 9–11, were sold to merchant Jacob Meier Amselsohn (No. 9), distiller Anders Møller (No. 10ndash11). In 1802, No. 9 was acquired by carriage builder James Fige. In February 1805, Bloms Enke & Sønner (Blom's Widow & Sons) acquired the three properties. Bloms Enke & Sønner, a partnership consisting of the widow Birthe Blom and her four mason sons, had already constructed a number of buildings at the other corner of the two streets. Their new site was listed in Copenhagen's new cadastre of 1806 as No. 401 in St. Ann's East Quarter. Their plan was to redevelop it with four new buildings. Only two of these (No. 401 A–B, now Dronningens Tværgade 56–58) had been constructed when the partnership was dissolved in 1809. It was subsequently acquired by Thomas Blom. The corner building (now Kronprinsessegade 40) was constructed by him in 1811. In 1815, finally embarked on the construction of the last building (No. 401 D, now Kronprinsessegade 42). It was completed the following year.

=== Blom's tenants, 1816–1843 ===
Blom owned the property until his death in 1841. It was sold by his widow in 1843.

The merchant Hans Puggaard lived in one of the apartments from 1816 to1818. Jacob H. Mansa (1797-1885), a military officer and Cartographer, was a resident in 1832–33. Another military officer, H. C. G. F. Hedemann (1792-1859), lived there from 1838 to 1846.

Hans Bull, an army major, resided on the first floor at the 1834 census. He lived there with his wife Anna Cecilie Rison, their two children (aged 16 and 21) and four lodgers. Jacob Frederick Ferdinandt Lerche, a colonellieutenant on paid stand-by (ventepenge), resided on the second floor with his wife Frederikke Elisabeth Christiane Lerckzau, two children (aged 21 and 28), husjomfru Johanne Cathrine Lehmann, a maid and a male servant. Thomas Lütcken, a captain in the Royal Danish Navy, resided on the third floor with his wife Karen Børresen (ballet dancer), their seven step children (aged five to 22) and one maid.

The property was home to 27 residents in five households at the 1840 census. Hans Bull, an army major on stand-by (ventepenge), resided on the first floor with his wife Anna Cecilia Bull, their two children (aged 22 and 27), a tutor, a male servant, a seemstress and the latter's 14-year-old son. Mathilde Dorothea Reimer (1768 - 1843), widow of General War Commissioner Christian Reimer (1753 - 1831), resided on the same floor with her daughter Charlotte Reimer, 21-year-old Elisabeth Schiønning (husjomfru) and one maid. Jens Jetsmark, editor of Adresseavisen, resided on the second floor with his wife Rosalia Augusta Bindseit, their three children (aged nine to 27) and one maid. Jens Frederik Thomsen , a senior clerk under Copenhagen Magistrate, resided on the third floor with his wife Ane Marie Thomsen, their five children (aged 16 to 27) and one maid. Rasmus Olsen, a courier for Bladselskabet, resided on the ground floor with his wife Johane Kirstine Pouelsen

=== 1845 census ===
The property was home to four households at the 1845 census.Marie Ann Good, widow of treasurer D. Good, resided on the first floor with two of her children (aged 18 and 29), one lodger and two maids. Jens Jetsmark, editor of L'benhavns Adresseavis, resided on the second floor with his wife Augusta Rosalia Jetsmark, three of their children (aged 14 to 32) and one maid. Anna Maria Charlotte Reimer, an unmarried woman with a pension, resided on the third floor wi the lodger Otto Ditlev Rosenørn Lehn and one maid. Hans Bull, an army major on paid stand-by, resided on the fourth floor eoth his Anna Cicilie Risom, two of their children (aged 27 and 32) and the lodger Elsine Caroline Nested.

=== 1844–1870s ===
Editor and politician Hother Hage (1816-1873) lived in the building from 1847 to 1851. Bishop and politician Ditlev Gothard Monrad (1811-1887) was a resident at No. 42 in 1856.

=== The Jesuits, 1787–1883 ===
In the second half of the 1760s, Kronprinsessegade 42 was acquired by the Jesuits in Copenhagen. They had until then been based first in the building Solitude in Nørrebro (27 October 1875 – 15 October 1876) and then at Ewaldsgade 5. The two lower floors of their new building in Kronprinsessegade was adapted for use as a Sacred Heart Of Jesus Chapel (Jesu Hjerte Kapel). It was inaugurated in April 1878. They parted with the building in 1883 after prefect Griider Præsterne had presented them with new premises in Ny Kongensgade. These were operated under the name St. Knud's Cjapel and St. Knud's School until 1887 when their new complex in Stenogade was inaugurated.

== Architecture ==
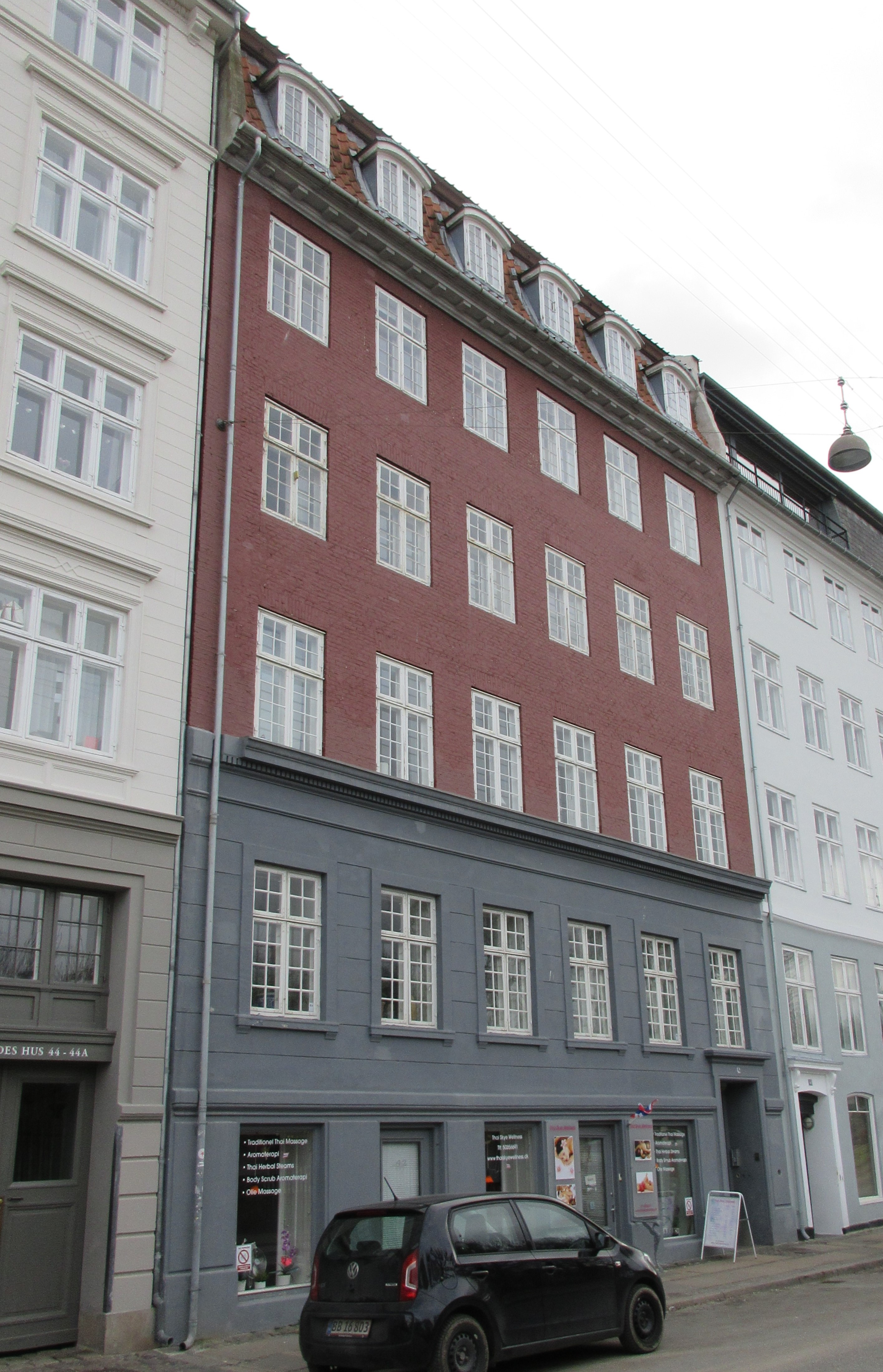
Kronprinsessegade 42.

Kronprinsessegade 42 is six bays wide. The roof is a Mansard roof with seven dormers.
