= Dronningens Tværgade 58 =

Building in Copenhagen

Dronningens Rværgade56
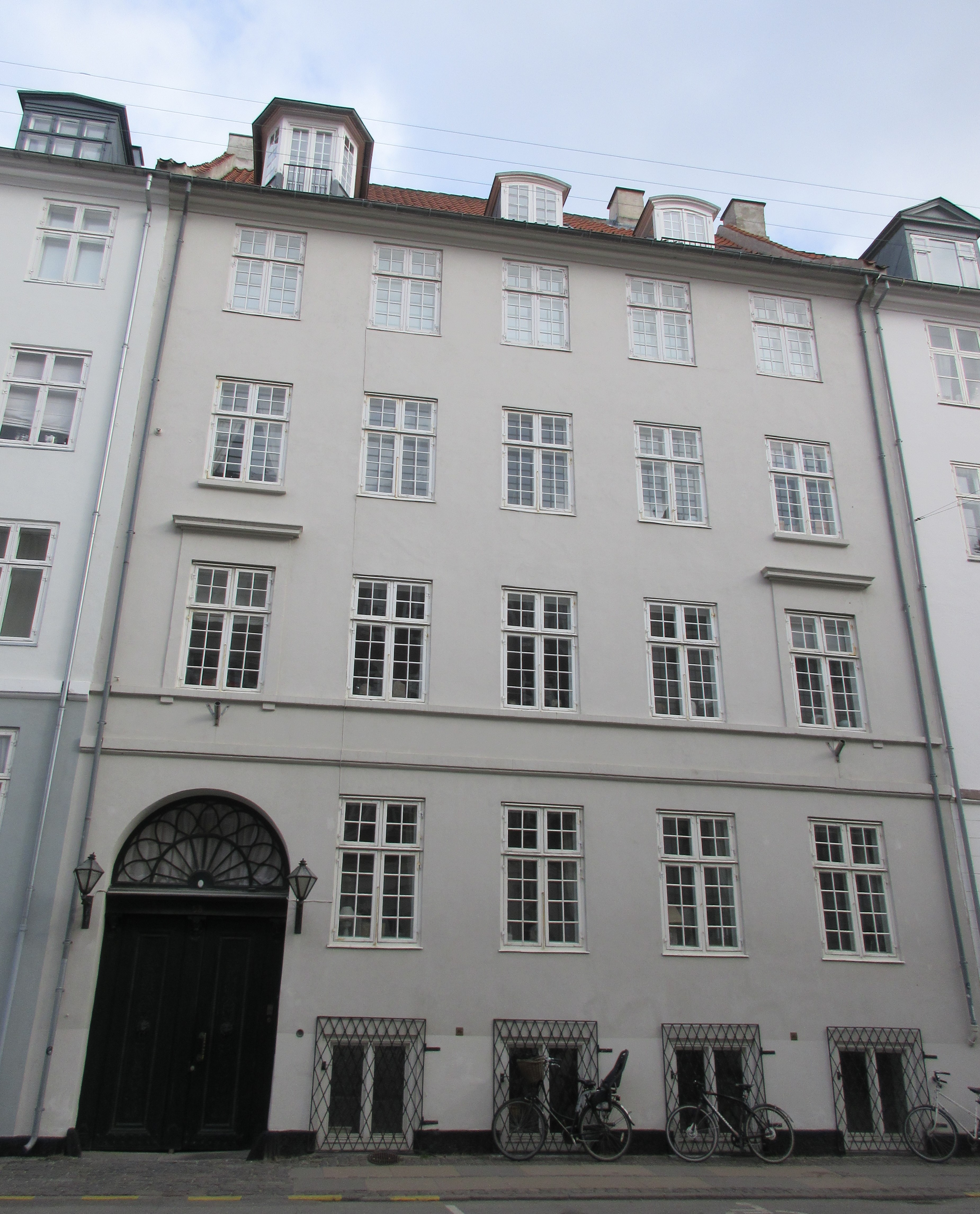
- Interactive map of the Dronningens Rværgade56 area

General information
- Location: Copenhagen, Denmark
- Coordinates: 55°41′5.39″N 12°34′59.2″E
- Completed: 1808

Dronningens Tværgade 58 is a Neoclassical property situated close to Rosenborg Castle Garden in central Copenhagen, Denmark. It was built in 1807–08 by Blonms Enke & Sønnder (Blom's Widow / Sons)—an equal partnership between a widow and her four mason sons—as the last of their nine buildings constructed with a rate of approximately one building per year. It was listed on the Danish registry of protected buildings and places in 1950.

== History ==
Dronningens Tværgade 58 is located on the 89 alen strip of Rosenborg Castle Garden which was presented to the City of Copenhagen by the King following the Great Fire of 1795. The land was used for the construction of the new street Kronprinsessegade and sold off in lots to private developers in the years after 1800. The three adjacent lots No. 9–11 at the northern corner of Dronningens Tværgade and Kronprinsessegade, until then a cul-de-sac, were in February 1805 acquired by Bloms Enke & Sønner (Blom's Widow & Sons). The firm was operated as an equal partnership between the brothers Peder, Thomas, Christian and Ole Blom, who had all trained as masons under J. M. Quist, in association with their mother Birthe Blom. Since none of the brothers were licensed as master masons, with membership of the Masons' Guild, they were neither allowed to employ other masons nor build for others. The renderings for their buildings were created by Thomas Blom while the mother and eldest brother Peder took care of the administrative work. The first building on Parcel 401 (Parcel 401 A, now No. 56) was completed in 1807. Dronningens Tværgade 58 (then Parcel 401 B) was built in 1807–08. The partnership was dissolved following Peder Blom's death in 1807 and the new building at No. 58 therefore ended up being its last building. In 1810, Thomas Blom was licensed as a master mason and resumed the work with the construction of Kronprinsessegade 40 (Parcel 401 C).

The physicist Hans Christian Ørsted resided in one of the apartments from 1816 to 1818. His brother, Anders Sandøe Ørsted, whose wife Sofie died the same year, was in 1818 also a resident in the building. Jørgen Henrich Rawert, Copenhagen's city engineer, resided in the building in 1822. The lawyer and politician Carl Christian Vilhelm Liebe was among the residents from 1852 to 1850.

The entire building was in 1862 owned by the sculptor Niels Waldemar Fjeldskov (1826-1903). Søstrene Carlsens Maskinstrikkeri (The Carlsen Sisters' Machine Knitting) was based in the building in the years around 1873. Klaus Berntsen (1844-1927), an educator and politician, was a resident in the building from 1905 to 1910.

== Architecture ==
The building consists of four storeys over a raised cellar and is five bays wide. The gate is topped by a fanlight and flanked by two wall-mounted lanterns. The red tile roof features three dormer windows towards the street. A six-bay perpendicular side wing with a chamfered corner bay extends from the rear side of the building.

== Today ==
The building has been converted into condominiums and is jointly owned by the owners through E/F Dronningens Rværgade 58.
