= Kronprinsessegade 36 =

Building in Copenhagen, Denmark

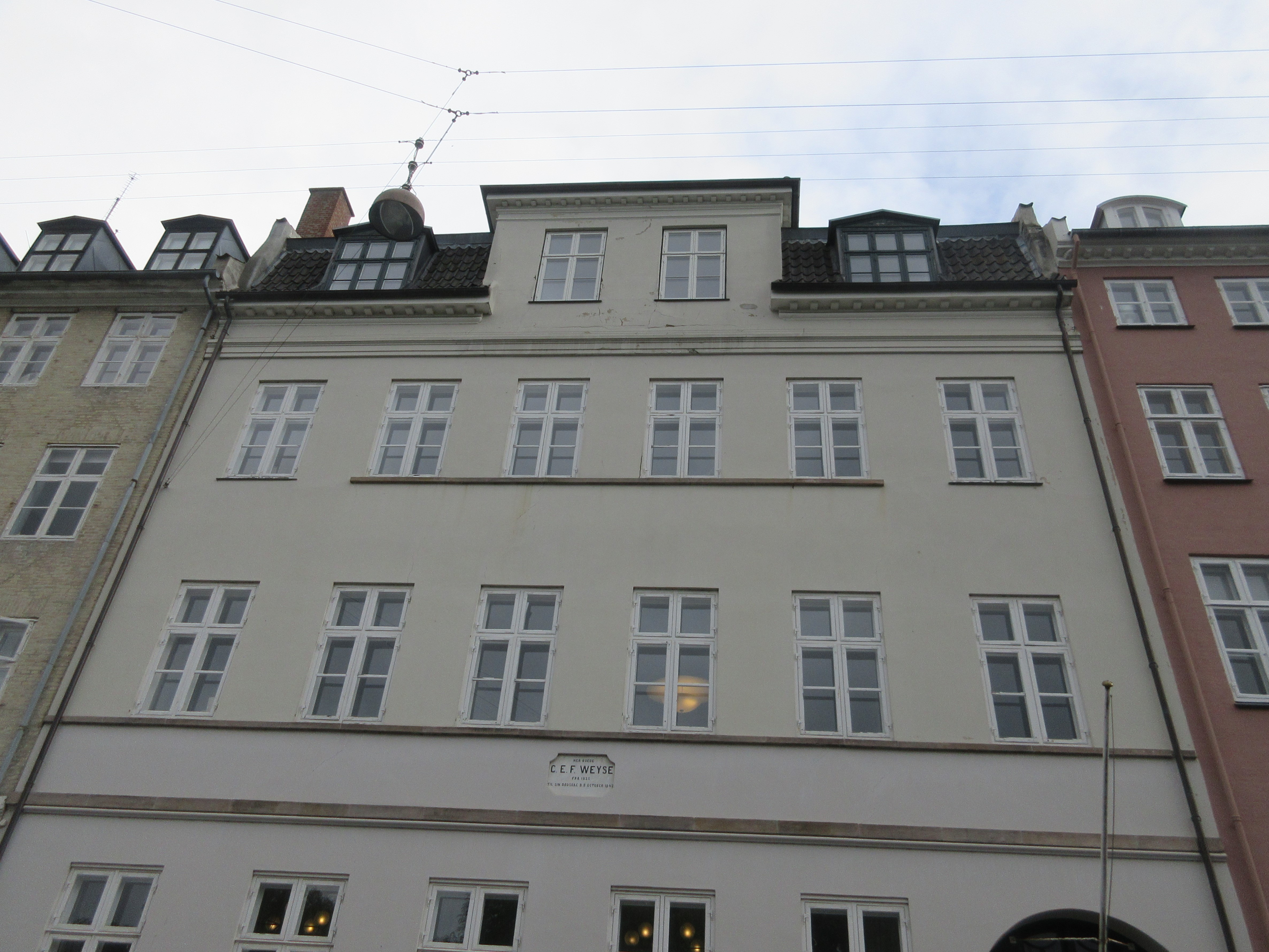
- Interactive map of the Kronprinsessegade 36 area

General information
- Location: Copenhagen, Denmark
- Coordinates: 55°41′4.62″N 12°34′57.23″E
- Construction started: 1820
- Completed: 1825

Design and construction
- Architect: Thomas Blom

Kronprinsessegade 36 is a Neoclassical property overlooking Rosenborg Castle Garden in central Copenhagen, Denmark. A plaque embedded in the wall between the first and second floor commemorates that the composer Christoph Ernst Friedrich Weyse lived in the building from 1825 to 1842.

== History ==
=== Blom family ===
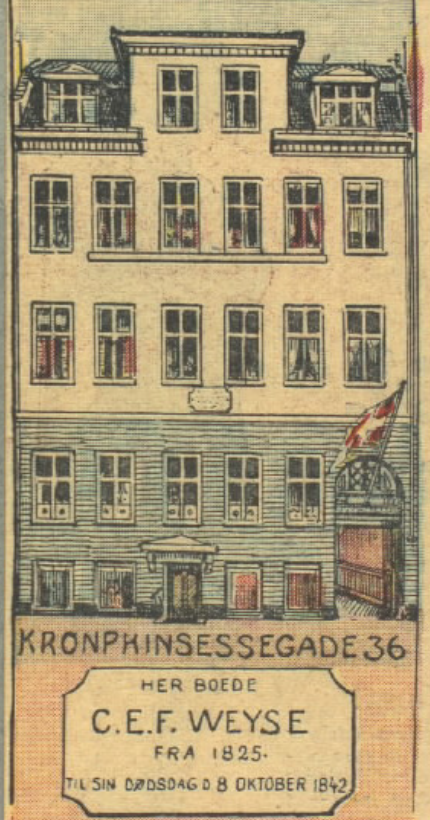
Kronprinsessegade seen in a print with a text that commemorates that Weyse lived in the building from 1825

The site was part of a large piece of land acquired by Bloms Enke & Co. The property was listed in the new cadastre of 1806 as No. 399 in St. Ann's West Quarter. A building had still not been constructed on the site when the firm was dissolved. The site was subsequently acquired by Thomas Blom. The present building on the site was built by him in 1820–1825. Blom had until then lived with his family at Kronprinsessegade 40. They moved to one of the apartments in the new building as soon as it was completed in 1825. Blom's son, Julius Blom, would later become a prominent master carpenter.

Thomas Blom lived in the building until his death in 1841. At the time of the 1840 census, he lived there with his wife J. C. Carstensen, their five children (aged 20 to 26), two male servants, and two maids. After Thomas Blom's death, the property was sold by his widow in 1845.

Charlotte Elisabeth Colsmann, widow of professor Johannes Colsmann (1771–1830), resided on the first floor with two sons (aged 22 and 26), 43-year-old Dicte Fredericke Preussen (teacher), one male servant and one maid. Lars Peter Larsen, a man of unknown profession, resided in the basement with his wife Christiane Larsen (née Brodersen), their five children (aged seven to 17), his mother-in-law Ane Petersen (widow) and one maid.

The second floor apartment was let out to the composer and organist Christoph Ernst Friedrich Weyse. He had lived at Kronprinsessegade 8 since 1915. He lived there with his housekeeper Karen and changing students and lodgers. Weuse lived in the apartment until his death in 1842. The mathematician and politician Carl Christoffer Georg Andræ also lived in the building from 1843 to 1846.

=== Sponneck ===
After Thomas Blom's widow sold the building, the new owner became Count Wilhelm Sponneck, a jurist. Sponneck lived in the building from 1845 to 1863. At the time of the 1845 census, he resided on the first floor with his wife Antoinette Siegfriede Sponneck (née Lozow), their two sons, his brother Carl Waldemar Greve Sponneck, a male servant, and a chamber maid.

Including the Sponneck family, the property was home to four households at the 1845 census. Christine Stampe (née Dalgas) resided on the second floor with a male servant and a maid. Catherine Carstensen, who was listed as "sister-in-law" (probably of Johan Arnold Hieronymus Carstensen) on the census, resided on the ground floor with Gustav Hugh Carstensen, one male servant, and two maids. Ane Maria Dohne resided in the basement with six children and a maid. Agent and landowner Nicolaj Nyholm and his wife Mathilde Cathrine Erasmine Nyholm (née Ammitzbøll) resided in the ground-floor apartment at the 1850 census. Their daughter Mathilde Nikoline Nyholm (1834–1894) was later married to Carl Valdemar Sponneck.

=== Later history ===
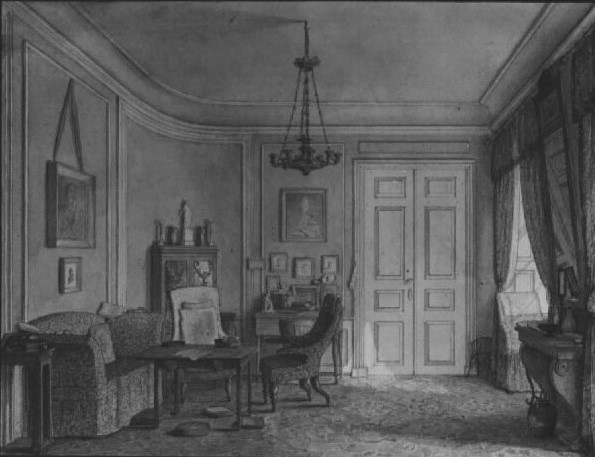
C. D. Fenger's living room at No. 36

Carl Emil Fenger (1814–1884), who served as Minister of Financial Affairs from May 1870 to March 1872, lived in the building from 1870.

== Architecture ==
The building consists of three storeys over a high cellar. It has a mansard roof with a two-bay wall dormer flanked by two dormers. A cornice supported by brackets runs under the roof.

A side wing extends from the rear side of the building. A four-storey warehouse is located at the bottom of the courtyard.

== Gallery ==
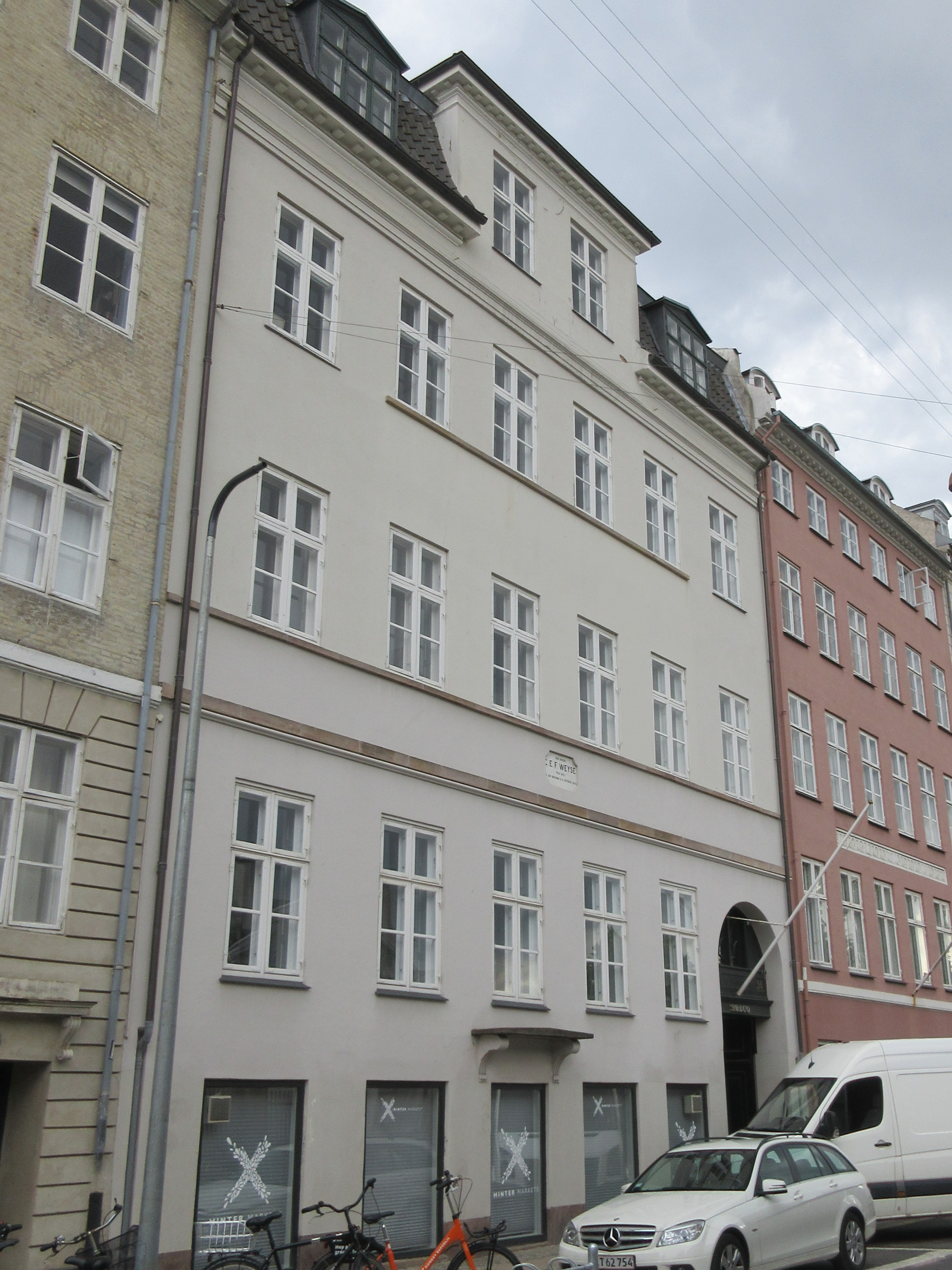

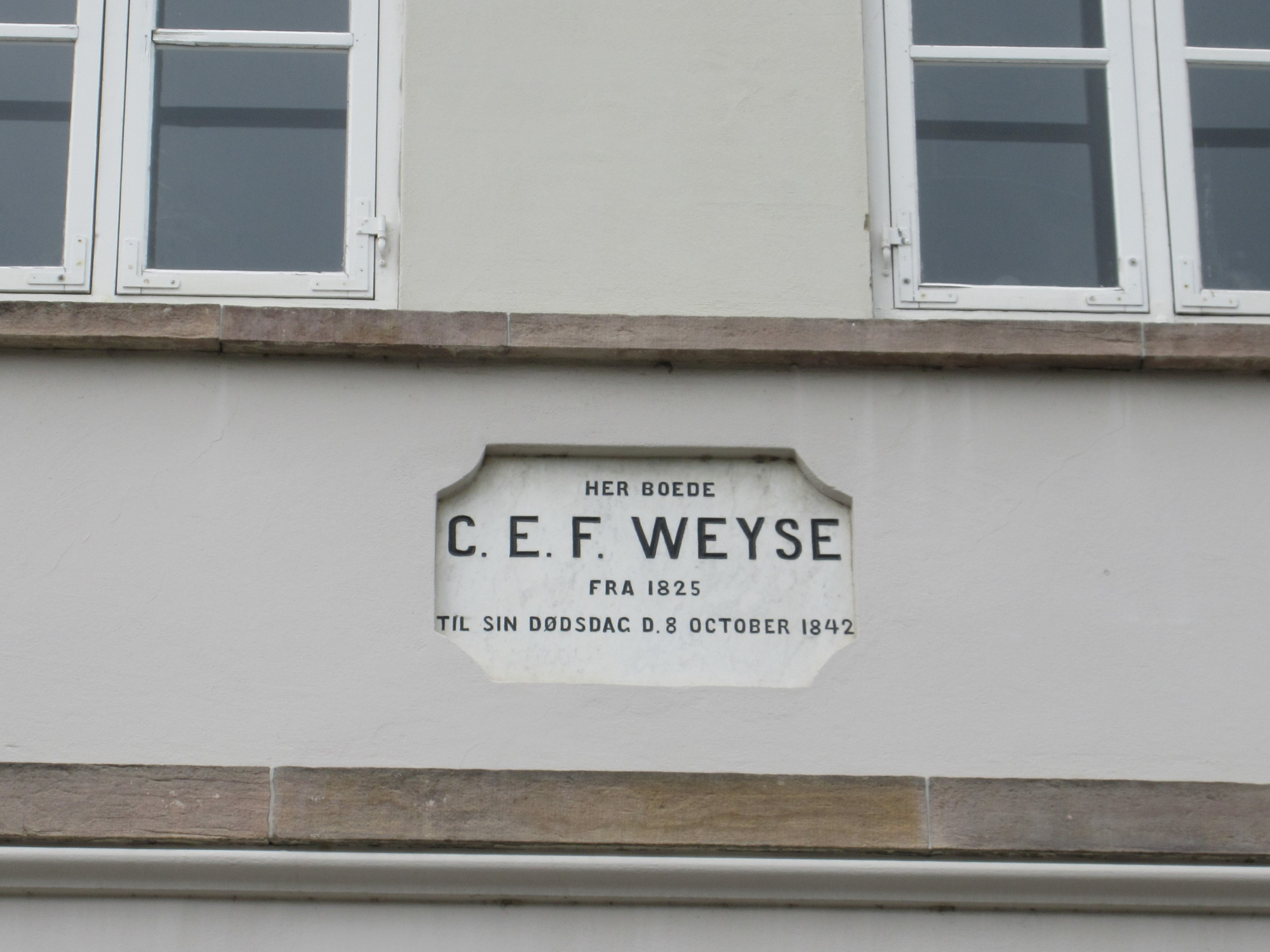

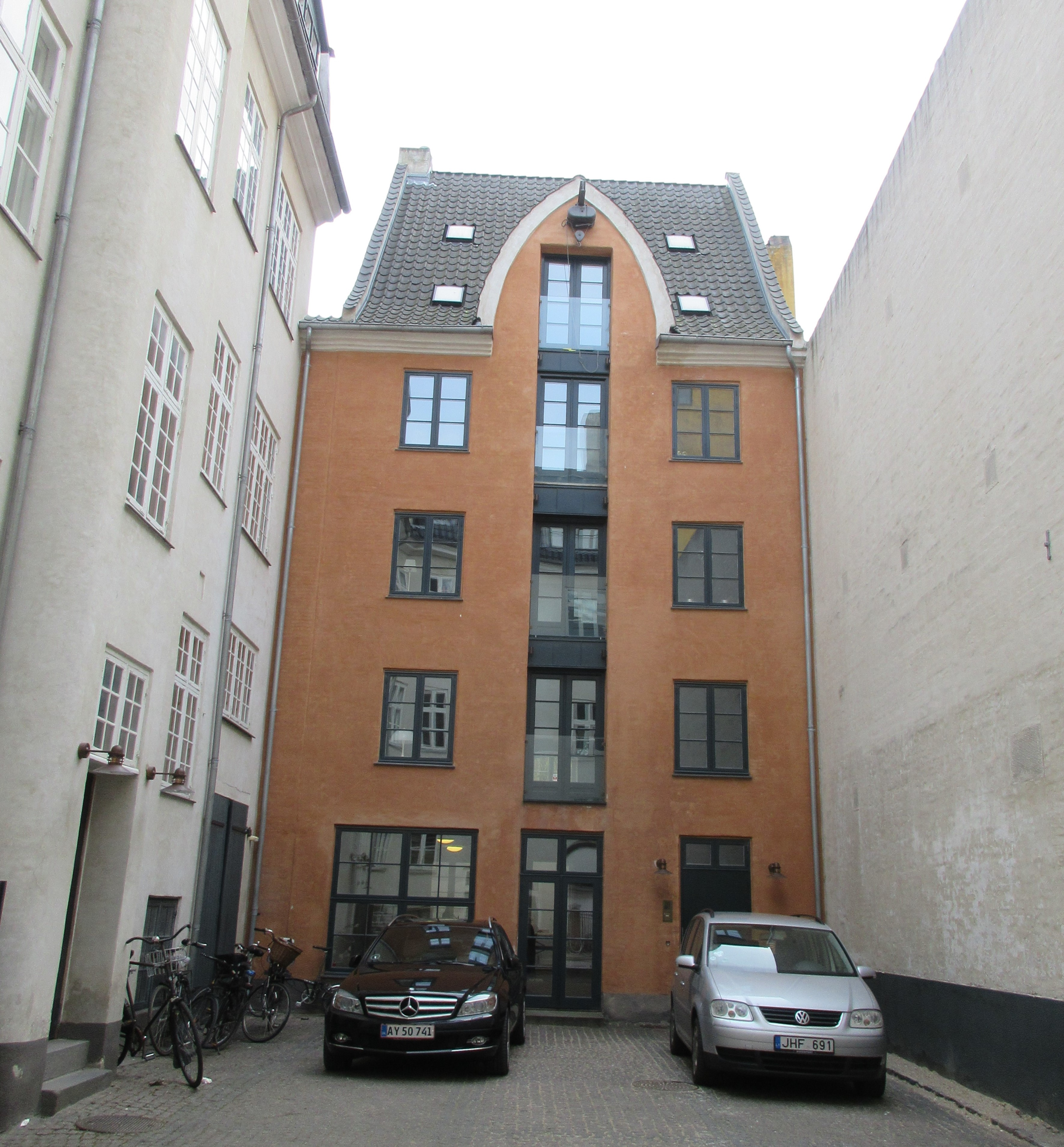
