= Thomas Blom =

Danish master mason, architect and developer

Thomas Andreas Blom
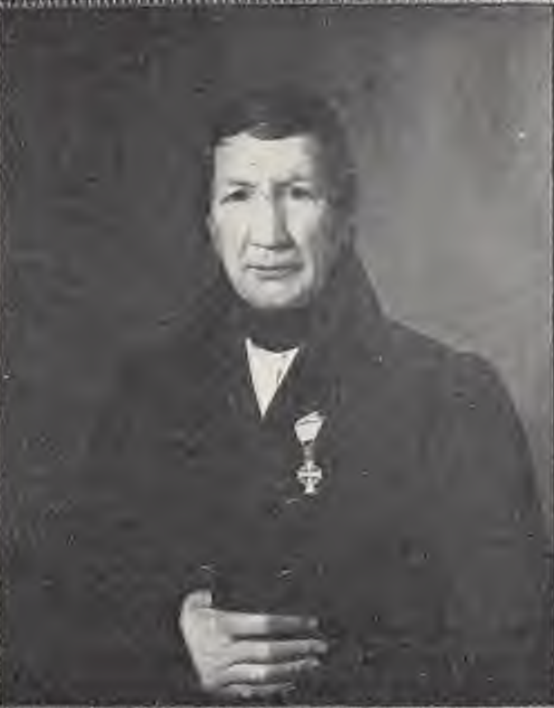
- Born: 18 November 1777; Copenhagen, Denmark
- Died: 21 November 1841 (aged 64); Copenhagen, Denmark
- Occupation: Architect

Thomas Andreas Blom (18 November 1777 – 21 November 1841) was a Danish master mason, architect and developer who contributed to the rebuilding of Copenhagen in the years after the Copenhagen Fire of 1795 and the Battle of Copenhagen in 1807. He initially worked in a partnership with his mother and three brothers as Bloms Enke & Sønner (Blom's Widow & Sons), constructing approximately one building per year between 1799 and 1808. After being licensed as a master mason in 1810, he continued the work independently. Most of his surviving buildings are listed on the Danish registry of protected buildings and places. He was also active in Copenhagen Fire Corps, reaching the rank of deputy fire chief. He was a driving force behind the foundation of Håndværkerstiftelsen as a charity providing affordable accommodation for old craftsmen and their widows in difficult circumstances.

== Early life and education ==
Blom was born in Copenhagen, the son of grocer (spækhøker) Niels Pedersen Blom and Birthe Pedersdatter Blom). The father owned a house in the street Bryggerlængen (now Olfert Fischers Gade 5) from 1770. Thomas Blom and his brothers Peder (1882–1807), Christian (1774 – 7 November 1811) and Hans Ole (1780–1832) were all trained as masons under Jens Martin Quist. Thomas Blom worked for Quist for another six years after completing his apprenticeship in 1791–94. The father died in October 1782. The mother most likely continued the grocery business after the father's death.

== Career ==
=== Bloms Enke & Sønner ===
The Copenhagen Fire of 1795 resulted in an immense need for rebuilding the city. On 8 October 1798, Blom's mother took a loan of 3,500 rigsdaler in the house in Bryggerlængen. The lender was Christiane Frederica Lugge, née Holst. half a year later, it was used for acquiring Bloms Enke & Sønner's first lot at the corner of Sankt Peders Stræde and Teglgårdsstræde. Sankt Peders Stræde 22 was constructed in 1799–1800. It was followed by Sankt Pedersstræde 20 in 1800–1801 and finally Teglgårdsstræde 3 in 1801–1802.

In June 1792, Bloms Enke & Sønner bought two lots (No. 7 and /) from Mathias Casse at the new street Kronprinsessegade. They were located on the southern corner with Dronningens Tværgade. By dividing the two long, narrow lots crosswise, it became possible to fit in a corner house as well as three small houses fronting Dronningens Tværgade. The first of the houses (Dronningens Rværgade 57) was already under roof in November the same year. From then on, Bloms Enke og Sønner started commenced a practice of building one house per year. The houses were each year completed in late autumn and the winter and spring months were then spent working on the interior. In May 1803, Bloms Enke & Sønner purchased the adjacent lot No. 6 from Joseph Rauch. By in the same time shortening the remaining lots from their previous acquisition, it became possible to fit in two more houses. Dronningens Tværgade 59 was constructed in 1803–1804, no. 61 was constructed in 1804–1805 and the corner building at Kronprinsessegade 38 was constructed in 1805–1806.

In February 1805, Bloms Enke & Sønner purchased the three lots No. 9–11 on the other side of Dronningens Tværgade. Dronningens Tværgade 56 was constructed in 1806–07 and immediately followed by No. 58 in 1807–08.

Peder Blom had died in 1807. The second eldest brother Christian had married his widow around half a year later and had by 28 March 1808 withdrawn from the family firm.

=== Work as master mason ===
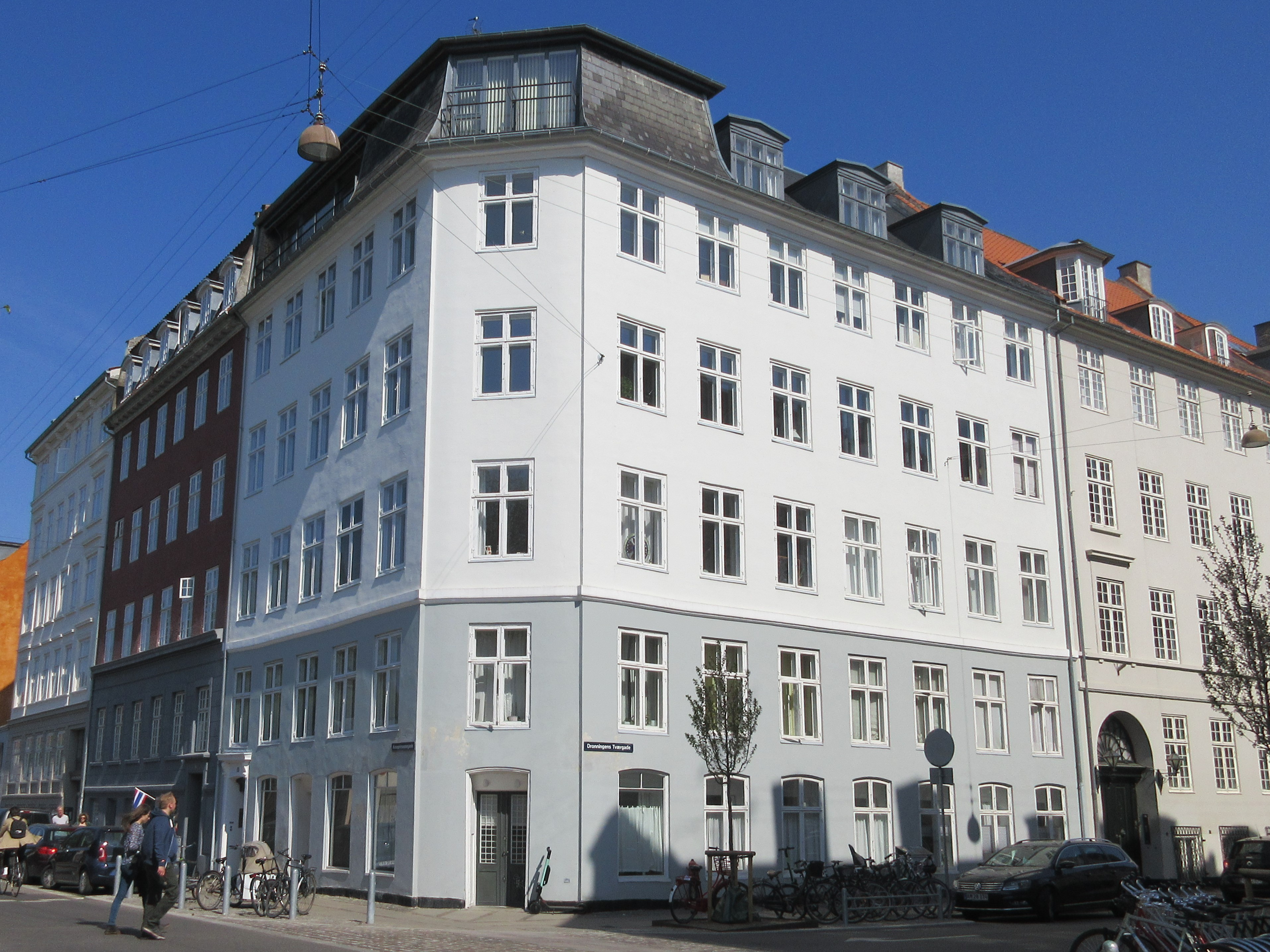
Kronprinsessegade 40

In the autumn of 1809, Blom bought his mother's and younger brother's shares of the still empty plots in Kronprinsessegade. Ole Blom was paid up front while his mother received a mortgage deed of 6,000 rigsdaler. On 6 October, with reference to his 10-year long experience as a builder, he applied the magistrate for permission for qualification as master mason without having to produce a masterpiece. The Masons' Guild and Danske Kancelli was consulted on the matter and the application was ultimately rejected. On 29 December, he was instead tasked with his masterpiece assignment. In consisted of creating the plans for the construction of a corner building for a pharmacy, complete with an advanced laboratory, as well as a specified family. In addition, he had to create an estimate of the construction cost in building materials and labour. Normally, applicants were also tasked with building a complicated vault structure but here Blom seems to have received a dispensation. His renderings have not survived but they were approved by professor C. A. Lorenzen and secretary T. Baden. On 30 April 1810, Blom finally became a member of the Masons' Guild. He immediately resumed the work at the corner of Dronningens Tværgade and Kronprinsessegade with the construction of Kronprinsessegade 40. The corner development was finally completed with the construction of Kronprinsessegade 42 in 1815–16. The reason for the delay was that Blom had started working on the demolition of Hirschholm Palace. He later also worked on the construction of the new City Hall (1831) and Christiansborg Palace (1813–25) and the Church of Our Lady.

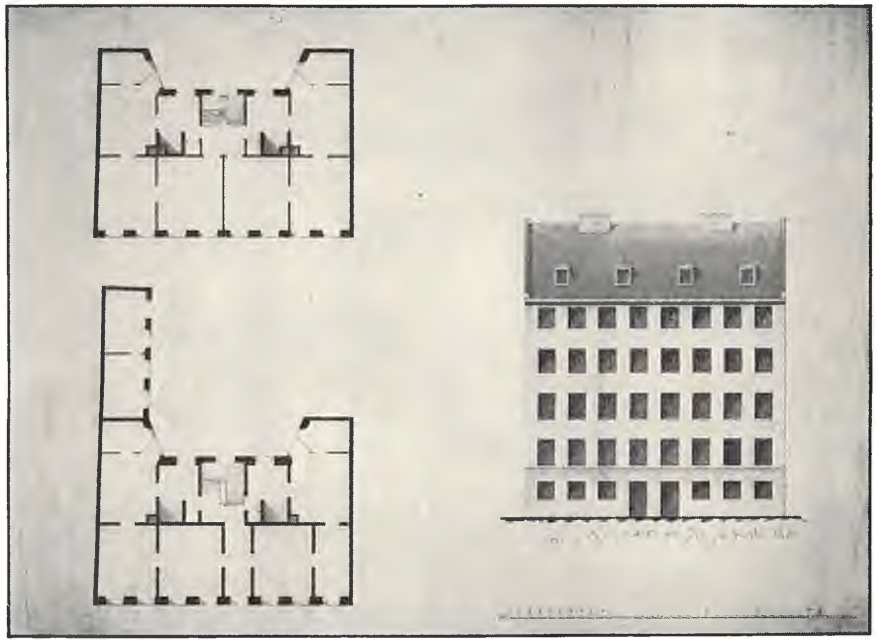
A not final rendering for Peder Hvitfeldts Stræde 14, 1821. The door was in the final design replaced by a gate.

His number of employees increased steadily from nine masons and apprentices in 1817 to 22 in 1821. It then declined to 15 in the year of his death. In 1820, Blom constructed a warehouse on the rear of the still undeveloped plot at Kronprinsessegade 36. In 1820, he acquired two adjoining plots in Peder Hvitfeldts Stræde and Købmagergade. The building in Peder Hvitfeldts Stræde (No. 14), a rather spartan five-storey tenement house, was completed the following year. In 1822–23, it was followed by a Købmagergade 65 (demolished in 1898). In 1824, he returned to Kronprinsessegade where the building fronting the street was completed the following year. In 1824, Blom purchased a portion of a large property in Sølvgade. He sold part of it again 1826 and used the rest of it for the construction of two eight-bay buildings at No. 20 (1826–27) and No. 21 (1830–31).

In 1834, Blom bought a large plot in Fiolstræde which had been left empty since the bombardment in 1807. It was used for the construction of No. 23 (1834–35), No. 21 (1835–36), No. 19 (1836). In 1837–39, he constructed his last building at the corner of Skindergade and Fiolstræde.

== Other activities ==
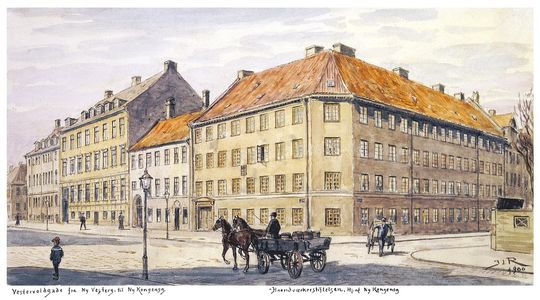
Håndværkerstiftelsen's building in 1900

Blom joined the reorganized Copenhagen Fire Corps in February 1810 as was normal for the city's masons, carpenters and smiths. He was promoted through the ranks until in 1834 reaching the rank of deputy fire chief.

Blom was active in the work for establishing Håndværkerstiftelsen as a charity providing free accommodation for old craftsmen and their widows in difficult circumstances. In 1836–37 he was responsible for constructing the building at the corner of Ny Kongensgade and Vester Voldgade. The four-storey building was 16 bays long towards Ny Kongensgade, eight bays long towards Vester Voldgade and had a chamfered corner. Blom received 4,949 rigsdaler for his masons but gave up his own cut of 1,800 rigsdaler for the good cause.

== Personal life ==
Blom was on 3 September 1811 married to Ingeborg Cathrine Carstensen. They moved into one of the apartments in his recently completed building at Kronprinsessegade 40. They had the children Johanne Emilie (1812–96), Peter Ludvig (1814–50), Julius Andreas (1815–1900), Sigvard August (1816–1900), Ida Wilhelmine (1818–96), Carl Waldemar (1819–c. 1838) and Julie Georgine (1820–85). Blom's mother lived with the family at Kronprinsessegade 40 until her death. In 1825, Blom and his family moved to a larger apartment in his just completed building at Kronprinsessegade 36.

Blom became a member of the Royal Copenhagen Shooting Society in 1835. He chose the view down Dronningens Tværgade from Rosenborg Castle Garden as the motif for his ceremonial target. He was created a Knight in the Order of the Dannebrog.

== List of works ==
=== Bloms Enke & Sønner ===
- Sankt Peders Stræde 22 (1799–1800)
- Sankt Peders Stræde 20 (1800–1801)
- Teglgårdsstræde 3 (1801–1802)
- Dronningens Tværgade 57 (1802–1803)
- Dronningens Tværgade 59 (1803–1804)
- Dronningens Tværgade 61 (1804–1805)
- Kronprinsessegade 38 (1805–1806)
- Dronningens Tværgade 56 (1806–1807)
- Dronningens Tværgade 58 (1807–1808)

=== Independent works ===
- Kronprinsessegade 40 (1810–1811)
- Kronprinsessegade 42 (1815–1816)
- Peder Hvitfeldts Stræde 14 (1820–1821)
- Kronprinsessegade 36 (1820/1824–1825)
- Købmagergade 65 (1822–1823, demolished in 1898)
- Sølvgade 20–22 (1826–1827)
- Fiolstræde 23 (1834–1835)
- Fiolstræde 19 (1836)
- Fiolstræde 21 (1835–1836)
- Fiolstræde 2/Skindergade 32 (1837–1838)
