= Kronprinsessegade 40 =

Historic building in Copenhagen, Denmark

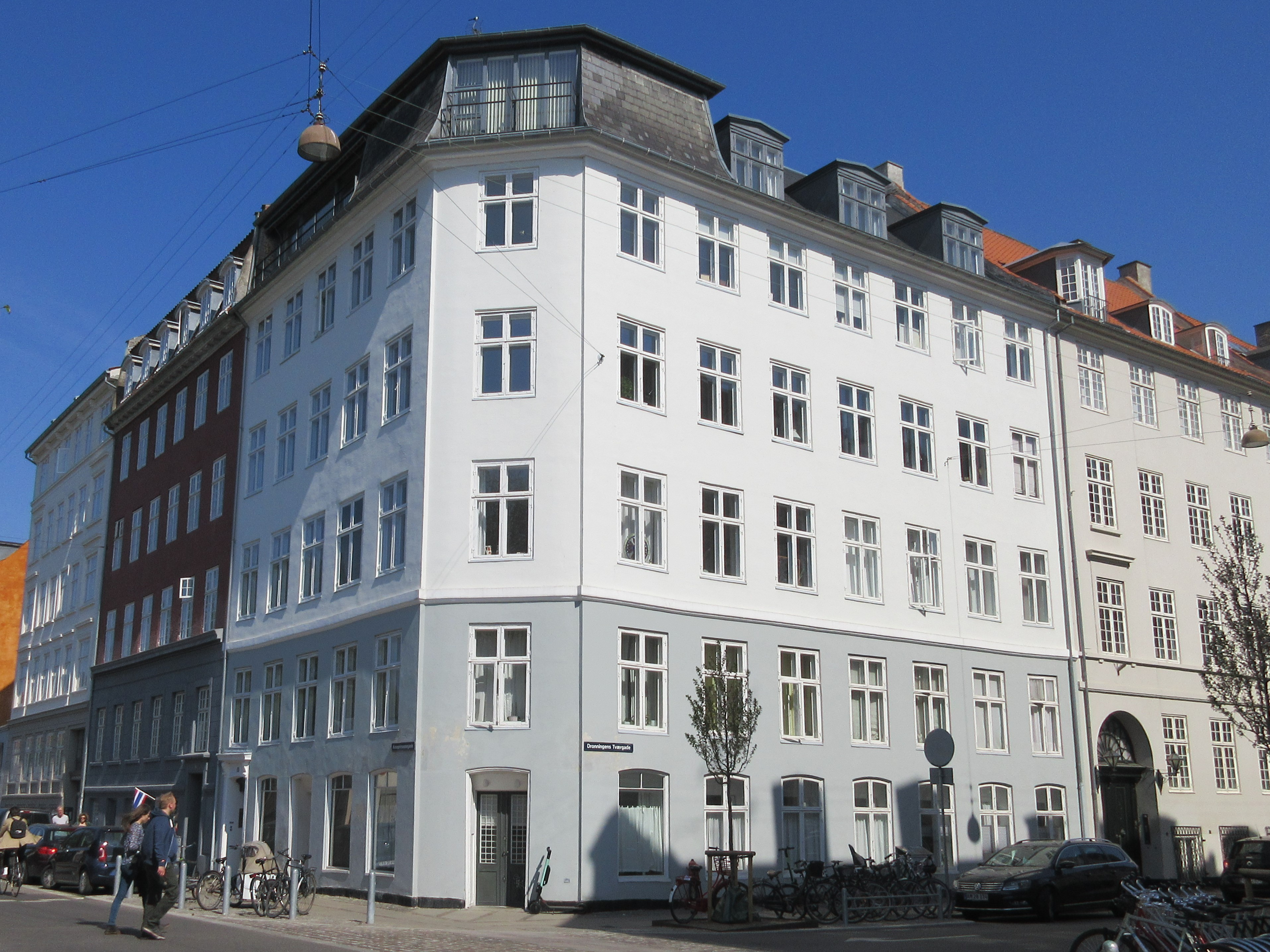
- Interactive map of the Kronprinsessegade 40 area

General information
- Location: Copenhagen, Denmark
- Coordinates: 55°41′5.8″N 12°34′58.24″E
- Completed: 1806

Kronprinsessegade 40 is a listed property located at the corner of Kronprinsessegade and Dronningens Tværgade in central Copenhagen, Denmark.

== History ==
=== Early history ===
The building was constructed by Thomas Blom (1777–1841) in 1811. Blom and his wife Ingeborg née Cathrine Carstensen (died 1860) moved into one of the apartments of the new building. They had seven children over the following eight-year period: Johanne Emilie Blom (1812–1896), Peter Ludvig Blom (1814–1850), Julius Andreas Blom (1815–1900), Sigvard August Blom (1816–1900), Ida Wilhelmine Blom (1818–1896), Carl Waldemar Blom (1819-ca.1838) and Julie Georgine Blom (1820–1885). In 1825, Blom and his family moved two houses down the street after he had completed a new building at Kronprinsessegade 36.

The organist and composer Johan Christian Gebauer (1808–1884) was among the building's residents from 1839 to 1841. The politician Andreas Frederik Krieger was a resident in around 1840 and again in 1845–1857. The writer Hans Egede Schack (1820–1859) was a resident in 1848. Athalia Schwartz (1821–1871) was a ramong the residents in 1849. Holger Drachmann (1846–1908) resided on the third floor in 1860–1864.

=== 1840 census ===
Hans Christopher Georg Fredrik von Hedemann, a major in the 1st Jutland Infantry Regiment, resided on the first floor at the 1840 census. He lived there with his wife Charlotte Eleonore Christine v. Hedemann, their six children (aged six to 18), two lodgers (students) and one maid. Alexandre Philippe de Jonquieres, a commercial bookkeeper, resided on the second floor with the widow Anne Hedevig de Jonquieres, her three children (aged 21 to 24), and two maids. Anna Elisa Krieger, widow of commander captain J. Krieger, resided on the third floor at the 1840 census. She lived there with her 28-year-old daughter Sophie Magdale. Krieger, her 22-year-old son Andreas Frederik Krieger, her 47-year-old sister Margarethe Vilhelmine Finne and one maid. Anders Sørensen Haastrup, a barkeeper, resided on the ground floor with his wife Ane Hansen Thøsløv. Carl Fred. v. Wilster, a commander in the 2nd Life Regiment of Foot, resided on the fourth floor with his wife Dorothea v. Wilster, their 32-year-old son, a servant (soldier) and a maid.

=== 1845 census ===
The property was home to four households at the 1845 census. Hans Christopher Georg Fredrik Hedemann, a commander of the 10th Line Infantry Battalion, resided on the first floor with his wife Charlotte Eleonore Hedemann, their six children (aged nine to 21), a maid and a lodger. Ferdinant August Gosch, a captain, resided on the second floor with his wife Anna Wilhelmine Staggemeier, their two children (aged 13 and 15) and one maid. Anna Elise Krieger, widow of the naval officer Johannes Krieger, resided on the third floor with his wife two of her children (aged 27 and 33), her sister Margarethe Wilhelmine Finne and one maid. Carl Frederik von Wilster, a colonel on paid stand-by (ventepenge), resided on the fourth floor with his lieutenant and royal customs official Carl Frederik Georg von Destinou, Destinou's wife, Caroline Frederikke Wilhelmine Con Wilster, their four-year-old daughter, and one maid.

=== 20th century ===
The designer Holger Blom resided in one of the apartments in the early 1960s.

== Architecture ==
The building consists of four storeys over a high cellar. It has five bays towards Kronprinsessegade, a chamfered corner bay and seven bays towards Dronningens Tværgade.
