= Listed buildings in Copenhagen Municipality =

This is a list of listed buildings in Copenhagen Municipality, Denmark.

== City Centre ==
=== A/Å ===
Listing name	Image	Location	Coordinates	Summary
Åbenrå 25		Åbenrå 25, 1124 København K	55°40′59.98″N 12°34′32.57″E	Townhouse from 1733
Åbenrå 26		Åbenrå 26, 1124 København K	55°40′59.99″N 12°34′34.58″E	Building from c. 1730
Åbenrå 27		Åbenrå 27, 1124 København K	55°41′0.08″N 12°34′32.15″E	House with side wing from c. 1761 whose facade was altered in c. 1860
Åbenrå 32: The Reformed Church's former rectory		Åbenrå 32, 1124 København K	55°41′0.52″N 12°34′32.88″E	Former rectory from 1730 to 1733
Admiralgade 17: Admiralgården		Admiralgade 17, 1066 København K	55°40′40.97″N 12°34′54.81″E	Building from 1797
Admiralgade 19		Admiralgade 19, 1066 København K	55°40′40.67″N 12°34′55.12″E	House with side wing and rear wing from 1796 to 1797
Admiralgade 20: Buurmester House		Admiralgade 20, 1066 København K	55°40′40.65″N 12°34′54.16″E	Building with rear wing from 1797 to 1798 by Ernst Burmeister
Admiralgade 21		Admiralgade 21, 1066 København K	55°40′40.37″N 12°34′55.42″E	Corner building from 1798 to 1799
Admiralgade 22		Admiralgade 22, 1066 København K	55°40′40.24″N 12°34′54.57″E	Building with two side wings from 1845 to 1846 and the cobblestones in the courtyard
Admiralgade 23		Dybensgade 21, 1071 København K	55°40′40.12″N 12°34′56.67″E	Corner building from 1800
Admiralgade 25		Admiralgade 25, 1066 København K	55°40′39.44″N 12°34′56.43″E	Corner building from 1800
Admiralgade 28		Admiralgade 28, 1066 København K	55°40′38.36″N 12°34′56.52″E	Corner building from 1798 to 1799 by Philip Lange and L.L. Thrane
Amagertorv 1		Amagertorv 1, 1160 København K	55°40′43.2″N 12°34′45.44″E	Corner building from 1796 to 1797 which was altered in 1854 by Christian Tybjerg
Amagertorv 6: Mathias Hansen House		Amagertorv 6, 1160 København K	55°40′44.23″N 12°34′44.53″E	Corner building from 1616
Amagertorv 20		Niels Hemmingsens Gade 1, 1153 København K	55°40′43.89″N 12°34′40.31″E	Building from c. 1680, which was altered and expanded with extra height in 1731 and again in 1857
Amagertorv 27		Amagertorv 21, 1160 København K	55°40′42.89″N 12°34′39.31″E	Part of the cellar dating from before 1536
Amagertorv 29: Klostergården		Amagertorv 29, 1160 København K	55°40′42.83″N 12°34′36.63″E	Building from 1768 to 1769 by Caspar Frederik Harsdorff, which was rebuilt after a fire in 1797–98 by Joseph Guione and expanded with an extra floor in 1880
Amaliegade 4		Amaliegade 4, 1256 København K	55°40′54.86″N 12°35′30.67″E	Three winged complex from 1828 to 1829 surrounding the first courtyard
Amaliegade 8		Amaliegade 8, 1256 København K	55°40′55.95″N 12°35′31.12″E	Corner building with seven-bay side wing from 1785 by Andreas Pfützner
Amaliegade 9: Collin House		Amaliegade 9B, 1256 København K	55°40′57.98″N 12°35′29.55″E	
Amaliegade 9: Collin House		Amaliegade 9, 1256 København K	55°40′58.38″N 12°35′27.6″E	
Amaliegade 11		Amaliegade 11, 1256 København K		Building from 1754 to 1755 by Niels Eigtved which was extended with the third and fourth floor in 1771–72
Amaliegade 11		Amaliegade 11 A, 1256 København K		Rear wing from 1753
Amaliegade 11		Amaliegade 11 B, 1256 København K	1753	Rear wing from 1753
Amaliegade 12		Amaliegade 12, 1256 København K	55°40′57.34″N 12°35′32.27″E	House from 1753 to 1755 by Niels Eigtved
Amaliegade 13		Amaliegade 13, 1256 København K	55°40′58.48″N 12°35′31.4″E	House originally built in 1755, but the upper floor made taller and mansard roof and triangular pediment added some time before 1783, and a side wing from 1808 which was shortened in 1960
Amaliegade 14		Amaliegade 14, 1256 København K	55°40′57.34″N 12°35′32.27″E	House with side wing from 1755 by Niels Eigtved
Amaliegade 15–17		Amaliegade 15, 1256 København K		Front houses and side houses (1754–56 by Niels Eigtved as two symmetrical houses, no. 15 elevated) and the back houses
Amaliegade 15–17		Amaliegade 17, 1256 København K		Front houses and side houses (1754–56 by Niels Eigtved as two symmetrical houses, no. 15 elevated) and the back houses
Amaliegade 16		Amaliegade 16, 1256 København K	1757	Building with side wing from 1756 to 1757 by Lauritz de Thurah
Amaliegade 18: The Yellow Mansion		Amaliegade 18, 1256 København K	1764	Neoclassical town mansion from 1764 by Nicolas-Henri Jardin on the foundation of an older building
Amaliegade 18: The Yellow Mansion		Toldbodgade 43D, 1256 København K	1764	Former Royal Life Guard stables from 1842 by Jørgen Hansen Koch as well as wall with gate
Amaliegade 21: Morten Farum House		Amaliegade 21A, 1256 København K		Rear wing from 1751
Amaliegade 21: Morten Farum House		Amaliegade 21B, 1256 København K		Rear wing from 1785 to 1786
Amaliegade 22: Niels Aagesen House		Amaliegade 22, 1256 København K		Building with side wing from c. 1750 by Niels Eigtved (altered in 1845–46) and the rear wing from 1846
Amaliegade 23: Fødselsstiftelsen		Amaliegade 23, 1256 København K		
Amaliegade 27: South Pavilion		Amaliegade 31A, 1256 København K		Building with attached wall and fence from 1755 to 1757 by Lauritz de Thurah as well as the surrounding paving
Amaliegade 31: North Pavilion		Amaliegade 31A, 1256 København K		Building with attached wall and fence from 1755 to 1757 by Lauritz de Thurah as well as the surrounding paving
Amaliegade 37		Amaliegade 37, 1256 København K		Building with narrow side wing from 1781 to 1782 by Caspar Frederik Harsdorff and the gateway wing from 1921
Amaliegade 38: Classen Library		Amaliegade 38, 1256 København K		Library building from 1792 built by Peter Hersleb Classen, probably with assistance from Andreas Kirkerup
Amaliegade 39: Danish Shipowners' Association		Amaliegade 33A, 1256 København K	1923	Office building from 1920 to 1923 by Emanuel Monberg consisting of a main wing fronting the street and a side wing
Amaliegade 41		Amaliegade 41, 1256 København K	1728	Building with side wing; the four southernmost wings were built in 1782–83 by C.F. Harsdorff and the rest was built in 1788 by Frederik Beckmann.
Amaliegade 43		Amaliegade 43, 1256 København K	1728	House with side wing begun in c. 1790 by Johan Martin Quist and completed in 1792–93 by Andreas Hallander
Amaliegade 45		Amaliegade 45, 1256 København K	1728	Building with side wing from 1788 to 1791 by Andreas Hallander, with new facade from 1801, probably by Jørgen Henrich Rawert
Amaliegade 47		Amaliegade 47, 1256 København K		Building with side wing from 1790 by Andreas Hallander
Amaliegade 49		Amaliegade 49, 1256 København K	1788	Corner building from 1788 by Andreas Hallander
Amalienborg Slotsplads: Amalienborg Palace		Amaliegade 18C, 1256 København K	55°40′59.04″N 12°35′34.86″E	
Amalienborg Slotsplads: Amalienborg Palace		Amaliegade 18D, 1256 København K	55°40′58.86″N 12°35′35.5″E	
Amalienborg Slotsplads: Amalienborg Palace		Amaliegade 19A, 1256 København K	55°40′59.72″N 12°35′32.17″E	
Amalienborg Slotsplads: Amalienborg Palace		Amaliegade 20A, 1256 København K	55°41′4.93″N 12°35′39.13″E	
Amalienborg Slotsplads: Amalienborg Palace		Amalienborg Slotsplads 1, 1257 København K	55°41′0.79″N 12°35′32.73″E	Christian VII's mansion
Amalienborg Slotsplads: Amalienborg Palace		Amalienborg Slotsplads 1, 1257 København K	55°41′0.79″N 12°35′32.73″E	
Amalienborg Slotsplads: Amalienborg Palace		Amalienborg Slotsplads 1, 1257 København K	55°41′0.79″N 12°35′32.73″E	
Amalienborg Slotsplads: Amalienborg Palace		Amalienborg Slotsplads 2, 1257 København K	55°41′0.16″N 12°35′35.18″E	
Amalienborg Slotsplads: Amalienborg Palace		Amalienborg Slotsplads 2, 1257 København K	55°41′0.16″N 12°35′35.18″E	
Amalienborg Slotsplads: Amalienborg Palace		Amalienborg Slotsplads 2A, 1257 København K	55°40′59.81″N 12°35′34.35″E	
Amalienborg Slotsplads: Amalienborg Palace		Amalienborg Slotsplads 3A, 1257 København K	55°41′3.04″N 12°35′31.2″E	
Amalienborg Slotsplads: Amalienborg Palace		Amalienborg Slotsplads 6B, 1257 København K	55°41′1.88″N 12°35′40.71″E	
Amalienborg Slotsplads: Amalienborg Palace		Amalienborg Slotsplads 7, 1257 København K	55°41′4.64″N 12°35′35.93″E	
Amalienborg Slotsplads: Amalienborg Palace		Amalienborg Slotsplads 7A, 1257 København K	55°41′5.23″N 12°35′36.96″E	
Amalienborg Slotsplads: Amalienborg Palace		Amalienborg Slotsplads 7B, 1257 København K	55°41′5.99″N 12°35′35.2″E	
Amalienborg Slotsplads: Amalienborg Palace		Amalienborg Slotsplads 7E, 1257 København K	55°41′6.28″N 12°35′32.45″E	
Amalienborg Slotsplads: Amalienborg Palace		Amalienborg Slotsplads 7K, 1257 København K	55°41′3.92″N 12°35′31.79″E	
Amalienborg Slotsplads: Amalienborg Palace		Amalienborg Slotsplads 8, 1257 København K	55°41′4.01″N 12°35′38.38″E	
Amalienborg Slotsplads: Amalienborg Palace		Toldbodgade 45A, 1253 København K	55°41′0.14″N 12°35′39.24″E	
Amalienborg Slotsplads: Amalienborg Palace		Toldbodgade 47, 1253 København K	55°41′4.14″N 12°35′41.98″E	
H. C. Andersens Boulevard 10: Tegneskolen for Kvinder		H.C. Andersens Boulevard 10, 1553 København V		Building with side wing from 1880 to 1881 by Vilhelm Klein
Antonigade 3		Antonigade 3A, 1106 København K		Building originally from before 1682 but expanded with extra height between 1713 and 1733 and rebuilt between 1768 and 1779
Antonigade 9		Antonigade 9, 1106 København K		House from 1766 by Hans Næss with side wing and rear wing
August Bournonvilles Passage 1: Brønnum House		August Bournonvilles Passage 1, 1055 København K	1856	Three-winged complex from 1856 to 1866 by Ferdinand Vilhelm Jensen
Axeltorv 12: Copenhagen Waterworks		Axeltorv 12, 1609 København V		Office building.
Axeltorv 12: Copenhagen Waterworks		Axeltorv 12, 1609 København V	1856	Pump house
Axeltorv 12: Copenhagen Waterworks		Axeltorv 12, 1609 København V		Chimney
Axeltorv 12: Copenhagen Waterworks		Axeltorv 12, 1609 København V		
Axeltorv 12: Copenhagen Waterworks		Axeltorv 12, 1609 København V		
Axeltorv 12: Copenhagen Waterworks		Axeltorv 12, 1609 København V		
Axeltorv 12: Copenhagen Waterworks		Axeltorv 12, 1609 København V		Gatehouse

=== B ===
Listing name	Image	Location	Coordinates	Summary	Ref.
Badstuestræde 7		Badstuestræde 7, 1209 København K	55°40′41.51″N 12°34′30.89″E	House with side wing from 1796 to 1798	
Badstuestræde 8		Badstuestræde 8, 1209 København K		Building fronting the street from 1797 to 1798 and side wing from 1797 to 1798 (altered 1945)	
Badstuestræde 8		Badstuestræde 8, 1209 København K		Rear wing from 1797 to 1798	
Badstuestræde 10A		Badstuestræde 10A, 1209 København K		Building from 1798 to 1799 af Ernst Burmeister	
Badstuestræde 12		Badstuestræde 12, 1209 København K		Building from 1799 to 1800 by Ernst Burmeister	
Badstuestræde 17		Badstuestræde 17, 1209 København K		Building with side wing from 1829 to 1832 by Carl Petersen	
Badstuestræde 18		Badstuestræde 18A, 1209 København K		Building from 1796 to 1797	
Badstuestræde 20		Badstuestræde 20, 1209 København K		Building from 1796 to 1797	
Boldhusgade 2		Boldhusgade 2, 1062 København K		Corner building with side wing from 1795 to 1796	
Boldhusgade 4		Boldhusgade 2, 1062 København K		Building from 1795 to 1796 (extra height added in 1851) with side wing	
Boldhusgade 6		Boldhusgade 2, 1062 København K		Corner building with side wing from 1795 to 1796	
Borgergade 17A: Prinsessegården (part of Dronningegården)		Borgergade 17A, 1300 København K		L-shaped apartment building from 1956 to 1958 by Kay Fisker, C.F. Møller and Eske Kristensen	
Borgergade 111: The Naval Girls' School		Borgergade 111, 1300 København K		Four-winged former girls' school from 1858 by Bernhard Seidelin, 1854 possibly designed by Peter Christoph Hagemann	
Borgergade 111: The Naval Girls' School		Borgergade 111, 1300 København K		Residence for employee	
Borgergade 111: The Naval Girls' School		Borgergade 111, 1300 København K		Guardhouse	
Borgergade 140		Borgergade 140, 1300 København K		Corner building from 1854, possibly designed by Peter Christoph Hagemann	
Borgergade 144		Borgergade 144, 1300 København K		House with side wing from 1796 to 1798	
Bremerholm 39: Københavns Skipperforening		Bremerholm 39, 1069 København K		Corner building from 1796	
Bredgade 4: Grandjean House		Bredgade 4, 1255 København K	1854	Building from 1853 to 54 by Christian Tybjerg	
Bredgade 4: Grandjean House		Store Strandstræde 3, 1255 København K	1854	Building from 1853 to 54 by Christian Tybjerg	
Bredgade 24 and Sankt Annæ Plads 2: Bredgade 24		Bredgade 24, 1260 København K		Corner building from 1855 by Niels Sigfred Nebelong	
Bredgade 26: Lindencrone Mansion		Bredgade 26, 1260 København K	1751	Noble town mansion from 1751 by Niels Eigtved	
Bredgade 28: Odd Fellows Mansion		Bredgade 28, 1260 København K		The old main building from 1751 to 1755 by Niels Eigtved and Gottfried Rosenberg as well as the two side wings with the two attached pavilions, gate, fence and cobbled courtyard and the extension with the Small Concert Hall to the old main building from 1889 by Johan Schrøder and Georg Wittrock	
Bredgade 34: Royal Danish Silk Manufactury		Bredgade 34, 1260 København K		Former royal silk manufactury from 1754, probably designed by Niels Eigtved	
Bredgade 38		Bredgade 38, 1260 København K		Complex of buildings from 1801 by Andreas Hallander	
Bredgade 51		Bredgade 51, 1260 København K		Complex of buildings at the corner of Bredgade and Frederiksgade from the 1880s by Ferdinand Meldahl with walls and gates	
Bredgade 42: Bernstorff Mansion		Bredgade 42, 1260 København K	1756	Noble town mansion 1752–56 by Gottfried Rosenberg and Niels Eigtveds consisting of a main wing fronting Bredgade and a side wing and wall along Frederiksgade	
Bredgade 58: Alexander Nevsky Church		Bredgade 53, 1260 København K	1883	Church building from 1881 to 1883 designed by David Ivanovitch Grimm	
Bredgade 60: Titken House		Bredgade 60, 1260 København K	1751	Corner building from 1755 to 1756) and the building at Fredericiagade 18 from 1835	
Bredgade 62: Royal Danish Academy of Surgery		Bredgade 62, 1260 København K		Building with flanking gates from 1785 to 1787 by Peter Meyn	
Bredgade 63-63 A		Bredgade 63, 1260 København K		Building fronting the street, two side wings and rear wing from 1886 by Ferdinand Vilhelm Jensen	
Bredgade 64: St. Ansgar's Cathedral		Bredgade 64, 1260 København K		Church building with attached rectory (including the fence along Bredgade) from 1841 to 1842 by Gustav Friedrich Hetsch	
Bredgade 65-65 A		Bredgade 65, 1260 København K		Building with two side wings from 1886 by Ferdinand Vilhelm Jensen	
Bredgade 65-65 A		Bredgade 65A, 1260 København K		Rear wing from 1886 by Ferdinand Vilhelm Jensen	
Bredgade 66: South Pavilion		Bredgade 66, 1260 København K		Building from 1755 to 1757 by Lauritz de Thurah with the walls margin of the lot as well as the surrounding paving	
Bredgade 68: Danish Design Museum		Bredgade 68, 1260 København K		Four-winged hospital complex from 1752 to 1757 by Niels Eigtved with surrounding walls, cast iron fences and paving as well as the central Grønnegården garden created by Gudmund Nyeland Brandt in 1923-24	
Bredgade 70: North Pavilion		Bredgade 70, 1260 København K		Building from 1755 to 1757 by Lauritz de Thurah with the walls along Bredgade and the northern margin of the lot as well as the surrounding paving	
Bredgade 71		Bredgade 71, 1260 København K		Building with side wing and rear wing from 1853	
Bredgade 74		Bredgade 74, 1260 København K		The wall on Bredgade, the wall along the northern margin of the lot and the paving	
Bredgade 76: Løve House		Bredgade 76, 1260 København K		Building with side wing from 1854 to 1855	
Bredgade 76: Løve House		Bredgade 76A, 1260 København K		Two-storey, two-bay former stable and carriage house in the courtyard from 1755 to 1757	
Brolæggerstræde 1		Brolæggerstræde 1, 1211 København K		Corner building from 1797 by C.F. Hollander	
Brolæggerstræde 2		Brolæggerstræde 2, 1211 København K		Corner building from 1797	
Brolæggerstræde 3		Brolæggerstræde 3, 1211 København K		Building from 1796 by L.L. Thrane	
Brolæggerstræde 4		Brolæggerstræde 4, 1211 København K	1797	Building from 1796 to 1797 by A.C. Wilcken and rear wing	
Brolæggerstræde 5 / Knabrostræde 11-13		Brolæggerstræde 5, 1211 København K		J. C. Jacobsen's former house from 1796 to 1797	
Brolæggerstræde 5 / Knabrostræde 11-13		Brolæggerstræde 5, 1210 København K		Side wing and brewery building in the eastern corner	
Brolæggerstræde 5 / Knabrostræde 11-13		Knabrostræde 13, 1210 København K		Warehouse and house from 1796 to 1799	
Brolæggerstræde 6		Brolæggerstræde 6, 1211 København K	1797	Building with side wing from 1797 to 1798	
Brolæggerstræde 8		Brolæggerstræde 8, 1211 København K	1797	Corner building from 1796 to 1797 by Christian Martens	
Brolæggerstræde 9: Gyldenfeldt House		Brolæggerstræde 9, 1211 København K	1797	Corner building with attached side wing from 1796 to 1798	
Brolæggerstræde 11		Brolæggerstræde 11, 1211 København K	1797	Building from 1795 to 1797 with seven bay side wing with wall	
Brolæggerstræde 12		Brolæggerstræde 12, 1211 København K	1797	Building from 1796	

=== D ===
Listing name	Image	Location	Year built	Summary	Ref
Dronning Louises Bro		Dronning Louises Bro 0, 1360 København K	55°41′12.27″N 12°33′49.49″E	Arch bridge from 1885 to 1887 by ilhelm Dahlerup and Charles Ambt	
Dronningens Tværgade 4B: Palægaragerne		Dronningens Tværgade 4B, 1302 København K	55°41′1.83″N 12°35′19.49″E	Multi-storey parking facility and canopy over filling station from 1933 by Oscar Gundlach-Pedersen and Højgaard & Schultz	
Dronningens Tværgade 5		Dronningens Tværgade 5, 1302 København K	55°40′59.78″N 12°35′16.82″E	Building from 1793 to 1794 by H.C. Ondrup	
Dronningens Tværgade 5		Dronningens Tværgade 5C, 1302 København K	55°40′58.45″N 12°35′15.92″E	Attached side wing to the rear	
Dronningens Tværgade 5		Dronningens Tværgade 5D, 1302 København K	55°40′58.81″N 12°35′16.24″E	Detached rear wing from c. 1850	
Dronningens Tværgade 7		Dronningens Tværgade 7, 1302 København K		Building from 1794 by H.C. Ondrup and A. Giedde	
Dronningens Tværgade 7		Dronningens Tværgade 7A, 1302 København K	1809	Rear wing from 1809 separating two of the three courtyards	
Dronningens Tværgade 7		Dronningens Tværgade 7B, 1302 København K	1879	L-shaped rear wing from 1879	
Dronningens Tværgade 10		Dronningens Tværgade 10, 1302 København K	1799	House with side wing from 1802	
Dronningens Tværgade 23: Dronningegården		Dronningens Tværgade 23, 1302 København K	1799	L-shaped apartment building from 1943 to 1944 by Kay Fisker, C.F. Møller and Eske Kristensen	
Dronningens Tværgade 37: Christiansgården (part of Dronningegården)		Dronningens Tværgade 37, 1302 København K		L-shaped apartment building by Kay Fisker, C.F. Møller and Eske Kristensen	
Dronningens Tværgade 56		Dronningens Tværgade 56, 1302 København K	1807	Building from 1806 to 1807 by Thomas Blom	
Dronningens Tværgade 56		Dronningens Tværgade 56, 1302 København K		Side wing from 1806 to 1807 by Thomas Blom	
Dronningens Tværgade 58		Dronningens Tværgade 58, 1302 København K	1807	Building	
Dybensgade 16		Dybensgade 16, 1071 København K			
Dybensgade 22		Dybensgade 22, 1071 København K			
Dybensgade 24		Dybensgade 24, 1071 København K	1887		
Dyrkøb 7		Dyrkøb 7, 1166 København K	1887	Building with side wing from c. 1870	

=== E ===
Listing name	Image	Location	Year built	Summary	Ref
Esplanaden 6		Olfert Fischers Gade 5, 1311 København K	55°41′14.2″N 12°35′50.33″E	Building from c. 1785 attributed to Andreas Kirkerup	
Esplanaden 15-17		Esplanaden 15, 1263 København K	55°41′17.76″N 12°35′27.38″E	Three-storey building with tavern extension from 1856 by Gustav Friedrich Hetsch	

=== F ===
Listing name	Image	Location	Coordinates	Summary
Fiolstræde 4-6: Metropolitanskolen		Fiolstræde 4, 1171 København K	55°40′46.78″N 12°34′28″E	Former school from 1811 to 1816 designed by Christian Frederik Hansen.
Fiolstræde 4-6: Metropolitanskolen		Fiolstræde 4, 1171 København K	55°40′46.78″N 12°34′28″E	Gymnastics hall from 1811 to 1816 designed by Christian Frederik Hansen.
Fiolstræde 7		Fiolstræde 7, 1171 København K	55°40′52.3″N 12°34′21.14″E	Building from 1819
Fiolstræde 8: Stiftsprovstsboligen		Fiolstræde 8, 1171 København K	55°40′48.28″N 12°34′24.43″E	Former residence of the stiftsprovst associated Church of Our Lady from c. 1840–41 with the wall along Fiolstræde
Fiolstræde 9		Fiolstræde 9, 1171 København K	55°40′52.7″N 12°34′20.86″E	Building from 1829 by F.C. Balsløw
Fiolstræde 11		Fiolstræde 11, 1171 København K	55°40′52.98″N 12°34′19.94″E	Building fronting the street from 1827 to 1828 by P.M. Quist
Fiolstræde 11		Fiolstræde 11, 1171 København K	55°40′52.98″N 12°34′19.94″E	Shed in the courtyards
Fiolstræde 12-14		Fiolstræde 12, 1171 København K	55°40′49.57″N 12°34′23.69″E	Building from 1838 to 1839 by Mads Holm
Fiolstræde 13		Fiolstræde 13, 1171 København K	55°40′53.35″N 12°34′20.44″E	Building with side wing from 1830 to 1831 by F.C. Balsløw
Fiolstræde 15		Fiolstræde 15, 1171 København K	55°40′53.73″N 12°34′20.15″E	Building from 1833 to 1834
Fiolstræde 16		Fiolstræde 16, 1171 København K	55°40′50.12″N 12°34′23.33″E	Building from 1728 to 1732 which was refurbished and expanded with an extra floor in 1807
Fiolstræde 17		Fiolstræde 17A, 1171 København K	55°40′54″N 12°34′19.7″E	Building with side wing from 1850 to 1851
Fiolstræde 18		Fiolstræde 18, 1171 København K	55°40′50.47″N 12°34′23.15″E	Corner building with side wing and rear wing from 1734
Fiolstræde 19		Fiolstræde 19, 1171 København K	55°40′54.39″N 12°34′19.61″E	Building with side wing from 1836 by Thomas Blom
Fiolstræde 20 and Krystalgade 16		Fiolstræde 20, 1171 København K	55°40′52.42″N 12°34′21.99″E	Corner building and the five-bay building at Krystalgade 10 from the 19th century
Fiolstræde 21		Fiolstræde 21, 1171 København K	55°40′54.7″N 12°34′19.41″E	Building with side wing from 1835 to 1836 by Thomas Blom
Fiolstræde 23		Fiolstræde 23A, 1171 København K	55°40′54.89″N 12°34′19.27″E	Building with side wing from 1834 to 1835 by Thomas Blom
Fiolstræde 25-27		Fiolstræde 25A, 1171 København K	55°40′55.28″N 12°34′19.06″E	Building at Fiolstræde 25 from 1814 to 1815 and building at Fiolstræde 27 from 1811 to 1813
Fiolstræde 26		Fiolstræde 26, 1171 København K	55°40′52.85″N 12°34′21.77″E	Building from 1808 to 1809 by C.I. Schmidt
Fiolstræde 28		Fiolstræde 28, 1171 København K	55°40′53.32″N 12°34′21.44″E	Building from 1812 to 1814 with side wing and rear wing from 1851
Fiolstræde 29		Fiolstræde 29, 1171 København K	55°40′55.92″N 12°34′18.71″E	Building from 1810 by J.C. Wahl
Fiolstræde 30-32		Fiolstræde 30, 1171 København K	55°40′53.66″N 12°34′21.18″E	Building at No. 30 which is from 1823 but was expanded with three extra floors in 1848, No. 32 1832 and two buildings in the courtyard from 1809
Fiolstræde 34-36		Fiolstræde 36A, 1171 København K	55°40′55.1″N 12°34′20.27″E	Building at No. 34 from 1810 to 1811 by Poul Egeroed and building with side wing No. 36 from 1812 by Poul Egeroed
Fiolstræde 38		Fiolstræde 39, 1171 København K	55°40′55.34″N 12°34′19.93″E	Building from 1827
Fiolstræde 40-42		Fiolstræde 40, 1171 København K	55°40′55.64″N 12°34′19.77″E	Building from 1828
Fiolstræde 40-42		Fiolstræde 42, 1171 København K	55°40′56.06″N 12°34′19.51″E	Corner building from 1827
Fiolstræde 40-42		Fiolstræde 42, 1171 København K	55°40′56.06″N 12°34′19.51″E	Building from 1973 connecting No. 40 and No. 42
Fortunstræde 1		Fortunstræde 1, 1065 København K	55°40′41.11″N 12°34′53.42″E	Corner building with two attached side wings from 1797 to 1798 by Johan Christopher Suhr (new mansard roof)
Fortunstræde 7: Hotel Royal		Fortunstræde 7, 1065 København K	55°40′40.47″N 12°34′51.83″E	Building from 1,796 possibly designed by Jørgen Henrich Rawert and expanded with an extra floor in 1886
Frederiksgade 20: Dronningens Ridehus		Frederiksgade 20, 1265 København K		Indoor riding venue from 1800, possibly by Boye Magens
Frederiksholms Kanal 12: The Prince's Mansion		Frederiksholms Kanal 12, 1220 København K		Noble town mansion originally built in 1684 but expanded and adapted in 1726 and later by Johan Cornelius Krieger and again in 1743–44 by Niels Eigtved
Frederiksholms Kanal: Frederiksholms Kanal 16		Frederiksholms Kanal 16, 1220 København K	1797	Building from 1851 to 1852 by H.C. Stilling
Frederiksholms Kanal 18: Frederiksholms Kanal 18		Frederiksholms Kanal 19, 1220 København K		Building fronting the street from 1851 to 1852 by H.C. Stilling sand attached side wing
Frederiksholms Kanal 20 and Ny Kongensgade 4: Frederiksholms Kanal 20		Frederiksholms Kanal 20, 1220 København K		Corner building originally from the 18th century but expanded with extra height and completely rebuilt in 1848
Frederiksholms Kanal 20 and Ny Kongensgade 4: Frederiksholms Kanal 20		Frederiksholms Kanal 20, 1220 København K		Warehouse from 1848
Frederiksholms Kanal 20 and Ny Kongensgade 4: Frederiksholms Kanal 20		Ny Kongensgade 4, 1472 København K		Building from 1848
Frederiksholms Kanal 24: Johan Borups Højskole		Frederiksholms Kanal 24, 1220 København K		Building from the 1740s
Frederiksholms Kanal 26-28: Civiletatens Materialgård		Frederiksholms Kanal 26F, 1220 København K		Royal Horse Guards Barracks
Frederiksholms Kanal 26-28: Civiletatens Materialgård		Frederiksholms Kanal 26F, 1220 København K		
Frederiksholms Kanal 26-28: Civiletatens Materialgård		Vester Voldgade 119A, 1220 København K	1748	Building
Frederiksholms Kanal 26-28: Civiletatens Materialgård		Frederiksholms Kanal 28K, 1220 København K	1748	Two-storey building facing the courtyard to the rear of the main building of Civiletatens materialgård
Frederiksholms Kanal 26-28: Civiletatens Materialgård		Frederiksholms Kanal 28A, 1220 København K		Civiletatens Materialgård: The main building
Frederiksholms Kanal 26-28: Civiletatens Materialgård		Frederiksholms Kanal 28E, 1220 København K		56-sq m house with large dormer.
Frederiksholms Kanal 26-28: Civiletatens Materialgård		Frederiksholms Kanal 28G, 1220 København K		Two-storey building with exposed timber framing facing the small alley next to the Stable Boy's House
Frederiksholms Kanal 26-28: Civiletatens Materialgård		Frederiksholms Kanal 28E, 1220 København K		
Frederiksholms Kanal 30: Fæstningens Materialgård		Frederiksholms Kanal 30, 1220 København K	1740	Materialforvalterboligen: House from 1740
Frederiksholms Kanal 30: Fæstningens Materialgård		Frederiksholms Kanal 30, 1220 København K	1748	Magasinet: Half-timbered storage building along Vester Voldgade from 1748
Frederiksholms Kanal 30: Fæstningens Materialgård		Frederiksholms Kanal 30, 1220 København K		Southern side wing
Frederiksholms Kanal 30: Fæstningens Materialgård		Frederiksholms Kanal 30, 1220 København K		Central side wing: two-storey building
Frederiksholms Kanal 30: Fæstningens Materialgård		Frederiksholms Kanal 30, 1220 København K		Northern side wing
Frederiksholms Kanal 30: Fæstningens Materialgård		Bryghusgade 2, 1220 København K		Southeast wing
Fredericiagade 4		Fredericiagade 4, 1310 København K	1854	7-bay building from 1854
Fredericiagade 8		Fredericiagade 8, 1310 København K	1852	7-bay building from 1852
Fredericiagade 12		Fredericiagade 12, 1310 København K	1853	Building fronting the street, side wing and rear wing from 1853
Fredericiagade 14		Fredericiagade 21, 1310 København K	1854	House with side and rear wing from 1854
Fredericiagade 21: Hansen Mansion		Fredericiagade 21, 1310 København K	1835	Town mansion from 1835 by Jørgen Hansen Koch
Fredericiagade 24: Østre Landsret		Fredericiagade 24, 1310 København K	1835	Former opera house from 1701 to 1703 designed by Johan Conrad Ernst and later altered by Caspar Frederik Harsdorff
Fredericiagade 24: Østre Landsret		Fredericiagade 24, 1310 København K	1835	Long wing perpendicular on Fredericiagade
Fredericiagade 73-79 and Rosengade 6-12		Fredericiagade 73–79, 1310 København K		Four houses from c. 1780 which were refurbished in c. 1975 by Erik Møller
Fredericiagade 73-79 and Rosengade 6-12		Rosengade 6–12, 1309 København K		Four houses from c. 1780 which were refurbished in c. 1975 by Erik Møller
Fredericiagade 86A		Fredericiagade 86A/88, 1310 København K		House from the late 17th century
Fredericiagade 90		Fredericiagade 90, 1310 København K		House built in 1746 and expanded with extra height in 1847
Fredericiagade 92		Fredericiagade 92, 1310 København K		House from the late 17th century
Fredericiagade 94		Fredericiagade 94, 1310 København K		House from the late 17th century

=== G ===
Listing name	Image	Location	Coordinates	Summary
Gammel Mønt 17		Gammel Mønt 17, 1117 København K	55°40′52.72″N 12°34′51.74″E	
Gammel Mønt 17		Sværtegade 11, 1117 København K	55°40′52.54″N 12°34′51.85″E	
Gammel Mønt 18		Gammel Mønt 19, 1117 København K	55°40′52.9″N 12°34′51.24″E	
Gammel Mønt 21		Gammel Mønt 21, 1117 København K	55°40′53.07″N 12°34′50.81″E	Building with side wing from 1730 to 1737, expanded with extra height in 1755–60, facade rebuilt in brick before 1780, mansard roof added before 1785
Gammel Mønt 23		Gammel Mønt 23, 1117 København K	55°40′53.17″N 12°34′50.54″E	Building with side wing 1730–35, expanded with extra height before 1765 and then altered and the facade rebuilt in brick between 1765 and 1804
Gammel Mønt 25		Gammel Mønt 25, 1117 København K	55°40′53.29″N 12°34′50.24″E	Building with side wing from 1729, walls rebuilt in brick and building expanded with extra height (probably) in 1788–89 and facade decorations added in 1891
Gammel Mønt 27		Gammel Mønt 27, 1117 København K	55°40′53.45″N 12°34′49.9″E	Building from 1730 to 1735 which was expanded with extra height in 1793-94
Gammel Mønt 29		Gammel Mønt 29, 1117 København K	55°40′53.59″N 12°34′49.59″E	Building with side wing from 1730 to 1735 which was expanded with extra height in 1743, 1779 and 1847
Gammel Mønt 31		Gammel Mønt 31, 1117 København K	55°40′53.74″N 12°34′49.23″E	Building from 1732 which was expanded with extra height in 1831
Gammel Mønt 35		Gammel Mønt 35, 1117 København K	55°40′54.09″N 12°34′48.57″E	Building from 1730 to 1736 which was altered in 1760-80 and expanded with extra height between 1835 and 1853
Gammel Mønt 37		Gammel Mønt 37, 1117 København K	55°40′54.24″N 12°34′48.22″E	
Gammel Mønt 39		Gammel Mønt 39, 1117 København K	55°40′54.38″N 12°34′47.76″E	Building from 1731 which was altered in 1748–87
Gammel Mønt 41		Gammel Mønt 41, 1117 København K	55°40′54.65″N 12°34′47.22″E	Corner building from 1734
Gammel Strand 36		Gammel Strand 36, 1202 København K	55°40′40.04″N 12°34′43.13″E	Building with side wing and rear wing from 1800 to 1801 by Johan Christopher Suhr
Gammel Strand 38		Gammel Strand 38, 1202 København K	55°40′39.96″N 12°34′42.73″E	Building with side wing from 1798 to 1799
Gammel Strand 40 and Læderstræde 9		Gammel Strand 40, 1202 København K	55°40′39.85″N 12°34′42.22″E	Building with side wing from 1799 to 1801
Gammel Strand 40 and Læderstræde 9		Læderstræde 9, 1201 København K	55°40′41.21″N 12°34′41.75″E	Building from 1830
Gammel Strand 42		Gammel Strand 42, 1202 København K	55°40′39.76″N 12°34′41.68″E	Building from 1799 to 1800 by Christopher Chrane
Gammel Strand 42		Gammel Strand 42, 1202 København K	55°40′39.76″N 12°34′41.68″E	Attached rear wing from 1799 to 1800 by Christopher Chrane
Gammel Strand 44		Gammel Strand 44, 1202 København K	55°40′39.58″N 12°34′40.99″E	Building with two side wings and rear wing from 1797 by F.C.G. Koop, fourth floor made taller in 1855 and dormer added in 1930
Gammel Strand 46		Gammel Strand 46, 1202 København K	55°40′39.4″N 12°34′40.4″E	Building with side wing and rear wing originally from 1732 to 1733 but rebuilt in 1796–97 by Andreas Hallander
Gammel Strand 48: Kunstforeningen		Gammel Strand 48, 1202 København K		Gammel Strand 48: Building with northern side wing from 1750 to 1751 by Philip de Lange, rebuilt after fire in 1795 and altered in 1796–97, dormer added in 1930. Læderstræde 15: Building from 1796 by J.C. Taubert
Gammel Strand 50		Gammel Strand 50, 1202 København K	55°40′39.02″N 12°34′38.92″E	Building with side wing and rear wing from 1796 to 1797 which was expanded with an extra floor in 1853
Gammel Strand 52		Gammel Strand 52, 1202 København K	1937	Corner building from 1797 to 1798 by H.C. Ondrup
Gammeltorv: Caritas Well		Gammeltorv 0, 1457 København K	1609	Fountain from 1607 to 1609 by Peter Hoffmann with sculpture by Statius Otto; altered 1784–85, possibly to design by Georg Erdman Rosenberg, well covered by a vault by Henrich Brandemann new plinth supporting the upper basin; altered in 1890–92 by Ludvig Fenger
Gammeltorv: 6: Stelling House		Gammeltorv 0, 1457 København K	1937	Commercial property from 1937 by Arne Jacobsen
Gammeltorv 14: Holm House		Gammeltorv 14, 1457 København K		Building with side and rear wing from 1798
Gammeltorv 16: Assessor Bachmann House		Gammeltorv 18, 1457 København K	1797	Neoclassical building from 1796 to 1797 with Ionic order pilaster and triangular pediment
Gammeltorv 16: Assessor Bachmann House		Gammeltorv 18, 1457 København K		Eastern side wing
Gammeltorv 16: Assessor Bachmann House		Gammeltorv 18 A, 1457 København K		5-bay rear wing at the bottom of the long, narrow courtyard
Gammeltorv 22: Suhr House		Gammeltorv 22, 1457 København K	1797	House with side wing from 1796 to 1797
Gammeltorv 22: Suhr House		Gammeltorv 22, 1457 København K		Rear wing in red brick
Gothersgade 8A & L: Baron Boltens Gård		Gothersgade 8A, 1123 København K		Building with side wing and attached rear wing from 1771
Gothersgade 8A & L: Baron Boltens Gård		Gothersgade 8L, 1123 København K		Half-timbered warehouse from 1755
Gothersgade 29		Gothersgade 29, 1123 København K		Building from between 1677 and 1684 which was expanded with extra height in 1765 and again in 1837–48 and had its facade altered in 1863 as well as the rear sing from before 1710 (extra height added)
Gothersgade 35: Hjorte Apotek		Gothersgade 35, 1123 København K		Building from 1800 to 1801
Gothersgade 56		Gothersgade 56, 1123 København K		Building from 1800 to 1801
Gothersgade 89		Gothersgade 89, 1123 København K		1729–32 and the attached side wing
Gothersgade 100: Rosenborg Barracks		Gothersgade 100, 1123 København K	1937	Building from 1742 by Johan Cornelius Krieger which was adapted and expanded for use as Royal Life Guard barracks in 1785 by Ernst Peymann; expanded with an extra storey and a mansard roof in 1845–47. The complex also comprises the north wing from 1742 which was originally used as housing for servants.
Gothersgade 126: Copenhagen Botanical Garden		Gothersgade 126, 1123 København K	1937	The greenhouse complex, terrace, staircase, round basin to the south and detached greenhouses to the east
Gothersgade 140: Botanical Laboratory		Gothersgade 140, 1123 København K		Building for UCC's Department of Botany from 1888 to 1890, by Johan Daniel Herholdt, including cross wing, walls, fence, gate pillars and two plantain trees
Gothersgade 143; Kunstnerhjemmet		Gothersgade 86, 1123 København K		Corner building with side wing from 1878 af Henrik Hagemann
Gråbrødretorv 1: Fiskebløderhuset		Gråbrødretorv 1, 1154 København K		Building from with side and rear wing from 1731 to 1732
Gråbrødretorv 2 and Løvstræde 14		Løvstræde 14, 1152 København K		Building facing the square from c. 1730 (wall dormer converted to full storey in 1832) and side wing along Løvstræde from 1832
Gråbrødretorv 3		Gråbrødretorv 3, 1154 København K		Building with side wing and rear wing from 1732 (altered in 1759) and appendix with staircase from c. 1816
Gråbrødretorv 4		Gråbrødretorv 4, 1154 København K		Building from 1765 with side wing and rear wing
Gråbrødretorv 5		Gråbrødretorv 5, 1154 København K		Building with rear wing from 1732 (wall dormer removed in c. 1816 and recreated in 1964)
Gråbrødretorv 6		Gråbrødretorv 6, 1154 København K		Corner building from 1729
Gråbrødretorv 7		Gråbrødretorv 7, 1154 København K		Building with side and rear wings from 1730 to 1732
Gråbrødretorv 8		Gråbrødretorv 8, 1154 København K		Building from c. 1730, dormer expanded to full third floor in 1852 and fourth floor added in 1858
Gråbrødretorv 9		Gråbrødretorv 9, 1154 København K		Building from 1729 which was expanded from two to four storeys with wall dormer in 1779
Gråbrødretorv 11		Gråbrødretorv 11, 1154 København K		Building with side wing from 1730 to 1731 which was expanded with an extra floor in 1843–44
Gråbrødretorv 11		Valkendorfsgade 20, 1151 København K		Building from 1844 with side and rear wing from 1747
Gråbrødretorv 12		Gråbrødretorv 12, 1154 København K		Building from 1813 by H.O. Blom; expanded with extra height in 1816 by the same architect
Gråbrødretorv 13		Gråbrødretorv 13, 1154 København K		House from 1730 to 1735 which was expanded with extra height in 1784
Gråbrødretorv 14		Gråbrødretorv 14, 1154 København K		Building with side wing and rear wing from 1828
Gråbrødretorv 15		Gråbrødretorv 15, 1154 København K		Building with eastern side wing from c. 1730 which was strongly altered and expanded with two extra storeys in 1851–52 as well as the western side wing from 1851 to 1852
Gråbrødretorv 16 og Gråbrødrestræde 18		Gråbrødretorv 16A, 1154 København K		Corner building from 1819 to 1821 by Johan Didrich Backhausen
Gråbrødretorv 16 og Gråbrødrestræde 18		Gråbrødrestræde 18, 1156 København K		Rear wing from 1853
Gråbrødretorv 19–21, Gråbrødrestræde 23 and Klosterstræde 20		Gråbrødretorv 19, 1154 København K		Gråbrødretorv 19 from c. 1730 (altered in 1808 and 1857–58), Gråbrødretorv 21/Gråbrødrestræde 23 from 1813 (altered in 1857–58) and Klosterstræde 20 from 1815 to 1816
Grønnegade 18		Grønnegade 18, 1107 København K		
Grønnegade 27		Grønnegade 29, 1107 København K		Building from before 1695, altered c. 1785 and 1834) med sidehus og baghus
Grønningen 7: Champagnehuset		Grønningen 7, 1270 København K	1936	Modernist apartment building from 1936 by Ib Lunding

=== H ===
Listing name	Image	Location	Coordinates	Summary
Hauser Plads 12		Hauser Plads 12, 1127 København K	55°40′56.66″N 12°34′32.8″E	Building from 1836
Hauser Plads 14		Hauser Plads 14, 1127 København K	55°40′56.81″N 12°34′33.43″E	Corner building from 1835 by Mads Holm
Hauser Plads 16		Hauser Plads 16, 1127 København K		Building from 1831
Hauser Plads 18		Hauser Plads 18, 1127 København K		Building from 1838 to 1839
Hauser Plads 24 and Åbenrå 23		Hauser Plads 24, 1127 København K		The building on Hauser Plads from 1733 (altered in 1807) and the building on Åbenrå from 1733
Hauser Plads 26		Hauser Plads 26, 1127 København K		Building from 1853 to 1854
Hauser Plads 28–32		Hauser Plads 28, 1127 København K	1752	
Hauser Plads 28–32		Hauser Plads 30–32, 1127 København K		
Hausergade 34		Hausergade 34, 1127 København K		Building from 1857 with the facade altered in 1866
Hausergade 36		Hausergade 36, 1127 København K		Corner building from 1824 to 1825
Havnegade 5: Danmarks Nationalbank		Kongens Nytorv 9, 1050 København K		Bank building from 1965 to 1978 by Arne Jacobsen
Havnegade 5: Levin House		Havnegade 29, 1058 København K	1866	Corner building from 1866 by Johan Daniel Herholdt
Højbro Plads 3A: Warburg House		Højbro Plads 3A, 1200 København K		Corner building with side wing from 1798 to 1799
Højbro Plads 6: Højbro Plads 6		Højbro Plads 6, 1200 København K	55°40′41.66″N 12°34′46.09″E	Building from 1804 to 1806 by Niels Schønberg Kurtzhals
Højbro Plads 9-11 and Lille Kirkestræde 6-8		Lille Kirkestræde 8, 1072 København K	1752	The corner building from 1796 to 1799
Højbro Plads 9-11 and Lille Kirkestræde 6-8		Lille Kirkestræde 6, 1072 København K		Lille Kirkestræde 6: Building from 1796 to 1799 (including the wall)
Højbro Plads 9-11 and Lille Kirkestræde 6-8		Højbro Plads 9, 1200 København K	55°40′42.61″N 12°34′48.8″E	Building from 1796 to 1799
Højbro Plads 13		Højbro Plads 13, 1200 København K		Corner building from 1796
Højbro Plads 15		Højbro Plads 15, 1200 København K	55°40′41.72″N 12°34′49.12″E	House with side wing from 1797
Højbro Plads 17		Højbro Plads 17, 1200 København K	55°40′41.45″N 12°34′49.19″E	House with side wing from 1797 to 1798
Højbro Plads 18		Højbro Plads 19, 1200 København K	55°40′41.13″N 12°34′49.3″E	House with side wing from 1798 to 1799 by Andreas Hallander
Højbro Plads 21: Ploug House		Højbro Plads 21, 1200 København K	55°40′40.93″N 12°34′49.42″E	Corner building from 1798 to 1799 by Andreas Hallander
Højbro Plads 21: Ploug House		Højbro Plads 21A, 1200 København K	55°40′41.3″N 12°34′50.23″E	Side wing from the late 19th century
Højbro Plads 21: Ploug House		Højbro Plads 21B, 1200 København K	55°40′41.63″N 12°34′50.83″E	Warehouse from 1798 to 1799 by Andreas Hallander
Holmens Kanal: Statue of Niels Juel		Holmens Kanal 0, 1060 København K	Monument to Niels Juel from 1877 to 1878 by Theobald Stein	
Holmens Kanal 2: Erichsen Mansion		Holmens Kanal 2, 1060 København K		L-shaped building with main wing fronting Kongens Nytorv and nine-bay wing along Holmens Kanal from 1797 to 1799 by Vaspar Frederik Harsdorff
Holmens Kanal 7: Grøns Pakhus		Holmens Kanal 7, 1060 København K		Department store from 1862 to 1863 by Johan Daniel Herholdt
Holmens Kanal 14		Holmens Kanal 14, 1060 København K		Building from 1897 to 1898 by Hermann Baagøe Storck
Hyskenstræde 3–5		Hyskenstræde 3, 1207 København K	55°40′41.59″N 12°34′35.84″E	Building with two attached, symmetrical side wings from 1854 to 1855
Hyskenstræde 7		Hyskenstræde 7, 1207 København K	55°40′40.93″N 12°34′36.41″E	Building with side wing from 1800
Hyskenstræde 9		Hyskenstræde 9, 1207 København K	55°40′40.68″N 12°34′36.7″E	Building from 1798 to 1799 which was completely altered in 1834 except for the facade
Hyskenstræde 14		Hyskenstræde 14, 1207 København K	55°40′40.75″N 12°34′35.78″E	Building from 1798 by Mathias Casse
Hyskenstræde 16		Hyskenstræde 16, 1207 København K	55°40′40.55″N 12°34′36.02″E	Building from 1797 by L.L. Thrane

=== K ===
Listing name	Image	Location	Coordinates	Summary	Ref.
Klareboderne 3: Gyldendal House		Klareboderne 3, 1115 København K	55°40′51.47″N 12°34′41.47″E	Building from 1731 to 1734 by Abraham Stoy	
Klareboderne 8		Klareboderne 8, 1115 København K	55°40′51.31″N 12°34′42.34″E	Building with side wing from 1733 which was expanded with an extra floor in 1864	
Klareboderne 10		Klareboderne 3, 1115 København K	55°40′51.5″N 12°34′42.61″E	Building with side wing from between 1730 and 1737 which was expanded with extra height in 1845	
Klerkegade 10: Selskabet Kjæden		Klerkegade 10A, 1308 København K	1800	Free Mason's Hall from 1869 by Vilhelm Tvede with side and rear wings at 10A from 1876 and the building at 10B from 1883	
Klerkegade 25: Den Wintherfeldtske Stiftelse		Klerkegade 25A, 1308 København K		The 14 eastern bays from 1837 of the 19-bay building	
Klerkegade 25: Den Wintherfeldtske Stiftelse		Klerkegade 25R, 1308 København K	1820	The six western bays from 1846 to 1847 of the 19-bay building	
Klerkegade 25G: Den Treschowske Stiftelse		Klerkegade 25G, 1308 København K	1800	Four-storey building from 1847 situated in the courtyard to the rear of Den Wintherfeldtske Stiftelse	
Klosterstræde 8		Klosterstræde 8, 1157 København K	1800	Building from 1732, which was altered and expanded with extra height between 1782 and 1795	
Klosterstræde 16		Klosterstræde 16, 1157 København K	1800		
Klosterstræde 21		Klosterstræde 21, 1157 København K	1800	Building from 1817	
Klosterstræde 22		Klosterstræde 22, 1157 København K	1800	Corner building from 1828 by Johan Didrich Backhausen	
Klosterstræde 23		Klosterstræde 23, 1157 København K	1800	Building facing the street from 1811 to 1812 as well as the rear wing and two side wings from 1808 to 1809	
Klosterstræde 24		Klosterstræde 24, 1157 København K	1800	Corner building from 1821 with four-bay extension towards Klosterstræde in 1827 and three extra floors added in 1833	
Knabrostræde 3		Knabrostræde 3, 1210 København K	1800		
Knabrostræde 5		Knabrostræde 5, 1210 København K	1800	Corner building from 1799 to 1800 by Ernst Burmeister. Building from 1798 to 1800.	
Knabrostræde 9		Knabrostræde 9, 1210 København K	1800	Corner building from 1799 to 1800 by Ernst Burmeister	
Knabrostræde 14		Knabrostræde 14, 1210 København K	1800	Corner building from 1799 to 1801	
Knabrostræde 16		Knabrostræde 14, 1210 København K	1800	Building from 1797 to 1799 by H.C. Ondrup and completed in 1804 by Andreas Hallander	
Knabrostræde 19		Knabrostræde 19, 1210 København K	1800	Corner building from 1797 to 1798 by Johan Martin Quist	
Knabrostræde 21		Knabrostræde 21, 1210 København K	1800	Building with two side wings from 1797 to 1798 by Johan Martin Quist	
Knabrostræde 22		Knabrostræde 22, 1210 København K	1733	House from 1735 which was altered in 1775, 1871 and 1896	
Knabrostræde 24		Knabrostræde 24, 1210 København K	1733	Half-timbered building from c. 1730 whose facade was rebuilt in brick in 1822; later subject to further alterations	
Knabrostræde 25		Knabrostræde 25, 1210 København K	1733	Corner building with side wing from 1838	
Knabrostræde 26: Soli Deo Gloria		Knabrostræde 26, 1210 København K	1733	Building from 1783 with side and rear wing from 1728 to 1745, later altered and courtyard covered in the 1850s	
Knabrostræde 28		Knabrostræde 28, 1210 København K	1733	Complex from c. 1730 consisting of two attached wings with gables facing Knabrostræde, a staircase tower and Magstræde and a wall surrounding the courtyard	
Knabrostræde 30		Knabrostræde 30, 1210 København K	1733	Building from 1733	
Købmagergade 5		Købmagergade 5, 1150 København K	55°40′45.75″N 12°34′45.55″E	Building with two side wings which were originally built in three storeys in 1729 but expanded with two extra floors in the late 18th century and a rear wing from 1807 that connects the two side wings to the rear	
Købmagergade 7		Købmagergade 7, 1150 København K	55°40′46.08″N 12°34′45.25″E	Building from 1729 by Philip de Lange which was expanded with extra height in the 1820s as well as a side wing and a rear wing	
Købmagergade 13		Købmagergade 13, 1150 København K	55°40′47.51″N 12°34′44.3″E		
Købmagergade 52		Købmagergade 52, 1150 København K	55°40′52.25″N 12°34′34.68″E	Corner building from 1750 to 1760; strongly altered in the 1870s and 1880s	
Kompagnistræde 2		Kompagnistræde 2, 1208 København K		Corner building from 1798 by L.L. Thrane	
Kompagnistræde 3		Kompagnistræde 3, 1208 København K		Building from 1796 (extra height added in 1803 and 1835) and attached side wing	
Kompagnistræde 4		Kompagnistræde 4, 1208 København K		Building from 1787	
Kompagnistræde 5		Kompagnistræde 5, 1208 København K		Building from 1798 to 1800	
Kompagnistræde 7-7A		Kompagnistræde 7, 1208 København K		Building fronting the street from 1797 to 1798	
Kompagnistræde 7-7A		Kompagnistræde 7A, 1208 København K	1820	Rear wing	
Kompagnistræde 7-7A		Kompagnistræde 7, 1208 København K	1820	Extension to rear wing	
Kompagnistræde 8		Kompagnistræde 8, 1208 København K		Corner building from 1799 to 1800 by Hans Weile	
Kompagnistræde 9		Kompagnistræde 9, 1208 København K		Building with side wing from 1796 to 1797 by C.C. Jennerich	
Kompagnistræde 10		Kompagnistræde 10, 1208 København K		Corner building with side wing from 1795 to 1796	
Kompagnistræde 11		Kompagnistræde 11, 1208 København K		Building with side wing from 1797 to 1798 with extra height added in 1847	
Kompagnistræde 12		Kompagnistræde 12, 1208 København K		Building from 1797 to 1798 by Hans Weile	
Kompagnistræde 14		Kompagnistræde 14, 1208 København K		Building from 1797 to 1798 by Michael Bälckow and rear wing	
Kompagnistræde 16		Kompagnistræde 16, 1208 København K		Building from 1798	
Kompagnistræde 16		Kompagnistræde 16A, 1208 København K		Rear wing	
Kompagnistræde 17		Kompagnistræde 11, 1208 København K		Building from 1798 by Michael Bälckow	
Kompagnistræde 18		Kompagnistræde 18, 1208 København K	1796	Corner building from 1797 by Andreas Hallander	
Kompagnistræde 20		Kompagnistræde 20, 1208 København K	1796		
Kompagnistræde 21		Kompagnistræde 21, 1208 København K	1796		
Kompagnistræde 21		Kompagnistræde 21, 1208 København K	1796		
Kompagnistræde 21		Kompagnistræde 21, 1208 København K	1796		
Kompagnistræde 21		Kompagnistræde 21, 1208 København K	1796		
Kompagnistræde 23		Kompagnistræde 23, 1208 København K	1796		
Kompagnistræde 24		Kompagnistræde 24, 1208 København K	1796		
Kompagnistræde 24		Kompagnistræde 24, 1208 København K	1796		
Kompagnistræde 25		Kompagnistræde 21, 1208 København K	1796		
Kompagnistræde 29		Kompagnistræde 29, 1208 København K	1796		
Kompagnistræde 31		Kompagnistræde 31, 1208 København K	1796		
Kompagnistræde 32		Kompagnistræde 32, 1208 København K	1796		
Kongens Nytorv: Equestrian statue of Christian V		Kongens Nytorv 0, 1050 København K	1796	Equestrian statue from 1685 to 1687 by Abraham César Lamoureux, recast in bronze instead of lead in 1946	
Kongens Nytorv 1: Charlottenborg Palace		Kongens Nytorv 1, 1050 København K		Four-winged town mansion from 1672 and later, probably designed by Ewert Janssen	
Kongens Nytorv 1: Charlottenborg Palace		Kongens Nytorv 1, 1050 København K	1820	The attached building in the southeastern corner from c. 1730 which contained Bertel Thorvaldsen's apartment	
Kongens Nytorv 3: Harsdorff House		Kongens Nytorv 3, 1050 København K	1780	Neoclassical townhouse from 1779 to 1780 by Caspar Frederik Harsdorff	
Kongens Nytorv 9: Royal Danish Theatre		Kongens Nytorv 9, 1050 København K	1874	Theatre building from 1872 to 1874 by Vilhelm Dahlerup and Ove Petersen	
Kronprinsensgade 5: A.C. Perch's Thehandel		Kronprinsensgade 5, 1114 København K	1800	Building from 1803 by Christian Martens	
kronprinsensgade 7		Kronprinsensgade 7, 1114 København K	1800	Building from 1805 to 1807 by Peder Friis	
Kronprinsessegade 2: Lars Larsen House		Kronprinsessegade 2, 1306 København K	1800	Corner building from 1801	
Kronprinsessegade 6		Kronprinsessegade 6, 1306 København K	1800	Building with side wing and attached intersecting wing from 1803 to 04 by Johan Martin Quist (later altered and expanded with an extra storey)	
Kronprinsessegade 8		Kronprinsessegade 8, 1306 København K	1800	Building with side wing from 1803 to 1804	
Kronprinsessegade 10–12		Kronprinsessegade 10, 1306 København K	1800	Two buildings with side wings by Johan Martin Quist; No. 10 is from 1803 to 1804 and No. 12 is from 1805 to 1806	
Kronprinsessegade 14		Kronprinsessegade 14, 1306 København K	1800	Building with side wing and cross wing from 1805 by Johan Martin Quist	
Kronprinsessegade 16		Kronprinsessegade 16, 1306 København K	1800	Building with side wing from 1806 by Johan Martin Quist	
Kronprinsessegade 18		Kronprinsessegade 18, 1306 København K	1800	Building with side wing and attached cross wing from 1807 by Johan Martin Quist	
Kronprinsessegade 20		Kronprinsessegade 20, 1306 København K		Building with side wing from 1805 by Andreas Hallander	
Kronprinsessegade 20		Kronprinsessegade 20A, 1306 København K		Nine-bay rear wing and wall	
Kronprinsessegade 22–24		Kronprinsessegade 22, 1306 København K	1800	Two buildings from Forhusene 1807–08 by Andreas Hallander and A. C. Wilcken	
Kronprinsessegade 26		Kronprinsessegade 26, 1306 København K		Building with side wing from 1805 to 1806 by Jørgen Henrich Rawert	
Kronprinsessegade 26		Kronprinsessegade 26B, 1306 København K		13-bay rear wing from 1805 to 1806 by Jørgen Henrich Rawert	
Kronprinsessegade 28		Kronprinsessegade 28, 1306 København K	1800	Building from 1805 to 1806 by Jørgen Henrich Rawert with the facade later altered	
Kronprinsessegade 30		Kronprinsessegade 30, 1306 København K		Building with side wing from 1806 to 1807 by Jørgen Henrik Rawert	
Kronprinsessegade 30		Kronprinsessegade 30, 1306 København K		Extension of the side wing	
Kronprinsessegade 32		Kronprinsessegade 32, 1306 København K	1800	Building from 1804 to 1805 by Johan Didrich Backhausen	
Kronprinsessegade 34		Kronprinsessegade 34, 1306 København K	1800	Building with two-bay side wing from 1805 to 1806	
Kronprinsessegade 36		Kronprinsessegade 36, 1306 København K		Building with side wing from 1824 to 1825 by Thomas Blom with later dormer	
Kronprinsessegade 36		Kronprinsessegade 36B, 1306 København K		Rear wing from 1820	
Kronprinsessegade 38		Kronprinsessegade 38, 1306 København K	1800	Corner building from 1805 to 1806 by Thomas Blom	
Kronprinsessegade 40		Kronprinsessegade 40, 1306 København K	1800	Corner building from 1810 to 1811 by Thomas Blom	
Kronprinsessegade 42		Kronprinsessegade 42, 1306 København K	1800	Building from 1815 to 1816 by Thomas Blom	
Kronprinsessegade 44: Jacob Gade Kollegiet		Kronprinsessegade 44, 1306 København K	1800	Building from 1804 to 1805 which was later expanded with extra height and with a facade on the street altered in 1847	
Kronprinsessegade 46: Kronprinsessegade Barracks		Kronprinsessegade 46, 1306 København K		Building with side wing from 1803 by Philip Lange	
Kronprinsessegade 46: Kronprinsessegade Barracks		Kronprinsessegade 46A, 1306 København K		Building fronting the street from 1805 to 1806 by Andreas Hallander and Jørgen Henrich Rawert	
Kronprinsessegade 46: Kronprinsessegade Barracks		Kronprinsessegade 48E, 1306 København K		Rear wing from 1805 to 1806 by Andreas Hallander and Jørgen Henrich Rawert	
Kronprinsessegade 48–50		Kronprinsessegade 50, 1306 København K	1800	No. 49: Building from 1807 by Jens Dahl; No. 50: Building from 1806 by Jens Dahl (facade was later altered) which was shortened with one bay in 1959	
Krystalgade 3		Krystalgade 3, 1172 København K	1830	Building from 1808 to 1809	
Krystalgade 5 and 5B		Krystalgade 5, 1172 København K		Building with side wing and rear wing, originally from the 1730s but expanded with extra height in 1857-58	
Krystalgade 5 and 5B		Krystalgade 5, 1172 København K		Toilet building in the courtyard from c.1913	
Krystalgade 9		Krystalgade 9, 1172 København K	1830	Building with side wing from 1786 and rear wing from c. 1860	
Krystalgade 11		Krystalgade 11, 1172 København K	1830	Building with side wing from 1730 to 1735 which was heightened several times between 1766 and 1788	
Krystalgade 8: Church of Our Lady's School		Krystalgade 8, 1172 København K	1830	School building from 1820	
Kvæsthusgade 3: Zinn House		Kvæsthusgade 3, 1251 København K	1800	Building originally from 1751 but extra height added in 1812 and oriel windows added in the 20th century	
Kvæsthusgade 5		Kvæsthusgade 5, 1251 København K	1800	Building originally from 1736, but expanded with two extra floors and adapted in 1845	

=== L ===
Listing name	Image	Location	Coordinates	Summary	Ref.
Læderstræde 5		Læderstræde 7, 1201 København K			
Læderstræde 7		Læderstræde 7, 1201 København K	55°40′41.42″N 12°34′42.34″E	Corner building with side wing from 1796 to 1797 by Jens Jansen	
Læderstræde 11B		Læderstræde 11, 1201 København K	55°40′40.99″N 12°34′41.07″E	The western building fronting the street; the seven western bays date from 1806 and the two eastern bays date from an extension in 1813 as well as a side wing and a rear wing	
Læderstræde 36		Læderstræde 36, 1201 København K	55°40′40.37″N 12°34′37.21″E	Corner building from 1798 to 1799 by Christopher Chrane	
Laksegade 26/Nikolajgade 24		Laksegade 26, 1063 København K	55°40′39.73″N 12°34′58.09″E	Corner building from 1797 to 1798	
Laksegade 28		Laksegade 28, 1063 København K	55°40′39.59″N 12°34′57.64″E	Building from 1796 to 1797	
Laksegade 30		Laksegade 30, 1063 København K	55°40′39.49″N 12°34′57.26″E	Corner building with side wing from 1797 to 1799	
Larsbjørnsstræde 5		Larsbjørnsstræde 5, 1454 København K	1820	Building fronting the street and its two side wings from 1797 to 1798 by J.C. Wahl	
Larsbjørnsstræde 5		Larsbjørnsstræde 5A, 1454 København K	1820	Building separating the two courtyards and its side wing from the late 19th century	
Larsbjørnsstræde 6		Larsbjørnsstræde 6, 1454 København K	1799	Building from 1798 by Philip Lange and L.L. Thrane	
Larsbjørnsstræde 7		Larsbjørnsstræde 7, 1454 København K	1799	Building from 1797	
Larsbjørnsstræde 11		Larsbjørnsstræde 11, 1454 København K	1799	Building from 1796 to 1798	
Larsbjørnsstræde 13		Larsbjørnsstræde 13, 1454 København K	1799	Building with side wing and rear wing from 1795 to 1796	
Larsbjørnsstræde 14		Larsbjørnsstræde 14, 1454 København K	1799	Three-bay building from 1796	
Larsbjørnsstræde 16		Larsbjørnsstræde 17, 1454 København K	1799	Corner building with side wing from 1798 by Christian Martens	
Larsbjørnsstræde 17		Larsbjørnsstræde 17, 1454 København K	1799	Corner building with side wing from 1796	
Larsbjørnsstræde 18		Larsbjørnsstræde 18, 1454 København K	1799	Corner building from 1796 to 1797	
Larsbjørnsstræde 19		Larsbjørnsstræde 19, 1454 København K	1799	Building from 1797	
Larsbjørnsstræde 21		Larsbjørnsstræde 21, 1454 København K	1799	Building from 1796 to 1798	
Larsbjørnsstræde 23		Larsbjørnsstræde 23, 1454 København K	1799	Building from 1807 to 1808	
Larsbjørnsstræde 25		Larsbjørnsstræde 25, 1454 København K	1799	Building from 1796	
Larslejsstræde 2: St. Peter's Church's former rectory		Larslejsstræde 2, 1451 København K	1820	Gormer rectory from 1820 consisting of house and wall along Larslejsstræde and building fronting Sankt Peders Stræde	
Larslejsstræde 2: St. Peter's Church's former rectory		Larslejsstræde 2, 1451 København K	1820	Gormer rectory from 1820 consisting of house and wall along Larslejsstræde and building fronting Sankt Peders Stræde	
Larslejsstræde 7: Sankt Petri Plejehus, Thymes og Pelts Stiftelse		Larslejsstræde 7, 1451 København K	1899	Three-winged complex in red brick from 1899 by Fr.L. Levy and its interior courtyard	
Lavendelstræde 1 and Hestemøllestræde 2		Lavendelstræde 1, 1462 København K	1799	Building from 1806 to 1807 by L.L. Thrane which was expanded with five bays in 1892–93	
Lavendelstræde 4–6		Lavendelstræde 4, 1462 København K		Np 4: Building with two-storey side wing from 1799 (mansard roof added in c. 1910); No. 6: Building from 1799	
Lavendelstræde 10		Lavendelstræde 10, 1462 København K		Building with two attached side wings from 1796 to 1797	
Lille Kannikestræde 4: Krigsraad Mørks Minde		Lille Kannikestræde 4, 1170 København K	55°40′48.66″N 12°34′29″E	Building from 1830 to 1831 by C.O. Aagaard	
Lille Kirkestræde 1 and Nikolaj Plads 28		Gammel Mønt 21, 1117 København K		Corner building from 1797 by Andreas Hallander	
Lille Kirkestræde 3		Gammel Mønt 21, 1117 København K		Corner building from 1797 by Andreas Hallander. Building constructed by Michael Bälckow & J. E. Burmeister in 1898–99.	
Lille Kongensgade 16: Karel van Mander House		Lille Kongensgade 16, 1074 København K		Building fronting Østergade from the middle of the 17th century but expanded with an extra storey in 1918 and building fronting Lille Kongensgade from the middle of the 17th century and 1877–79 as well as the connecting wings	
Lille Strandstræde 3		Lille Strandstræde 3, 1254 København K		Building originally from the early 18th century but altered in 1857 as well as the side wing from the 18th century and the wing (1732) separating the two consecutive courtyards	
Lille Strandstræde 6: Verrayon House		Lille Strandstræde 6, 1254 København K		House with side wing from 1769 – possibly designed by Nicolas-Henri Jardin – and an attached rear wing (c. 1680), a warehouse (1805) and the two cobbled courtyards	
Lille Strandstræde 8		Lille Strandstræde 8, 1254 København K		Building from the 18th century which was adapted and expanded with two extra storeys in 1786 and the attached side wing from 1832	
Lille Strandstræde 10		Lille Strandstræde 10, 1254 København K		Four-bay building from c. 1750 (adapted in 1888), nine-bay side wing and two-bay rear wing from before 1750 as well as the cobbled courtyard	
Lille Strandstræde 12		Lille Strandstræde 12, 1254 København K		Building with side wing from 1785 with extra height and new facade decorations added in 1832	
Lille Strandstræde 13–15		Lille Strandstræde 13, 1254 København K		Corner building with side wing at Lille Strandstræde 15, the building at Lille Strandstræde 13 and a warehouse in the courtyard	
Lille Strandstræde 14: Brigadér Halling House		Lille Strandstræde 14A, 1254 København K		House with four-bay side wing and half-timbered staircase tower, originally dating from the 17th century but altered in 1773–76, probably by Hans Næss	
Lille Strandstræde 16		Lille Strandstræde 16, 1254 København K		House from the 18th century and later	
Lille Strandstræde 18		Lille Strandstræde 18, 1254 København K	1799	Building with side wing from 1833 to 1834	
Lille Strandstræde 20		Lille Strandstræde 20, 1254 København K	1799	Building fronting the street from 1797 (expanded with an extra floor in 1855) as well as two side wings and an attached rear wing from 1858	

=== M ===
Listing name	Image	Location	Coordinates	Description	Ref.
Magstræde 6: Schäffer House		Magstræde 6, 1204 København K	55°40′35.63″N 12°34′32.75″E	House with dressed, half-timbered side wing from 1733 to 1734 by Philip de Lange	
Magstræde 7		Magstræde 7, 1204 København K	55°40′35.31″N 12°34′33.16″E	Building from c. 1730 which was adapted in 1803 by Poul Egeroed	
Magstræde 8		Magstræde 8, 1204 København K	55°40′35.46″N 12°34′32.3″E	Building from c. 1730-50 which was altered in c. 1780-90	
Magstræde 12		Magstræde 12, 1204 København K	55°40′35.11″N 12°34′31.41″E		
Magstræde 16		Magstræde 16, 1204 København K	55°40′34.74″N 12°34′30.47″E	Building from between 1730 and 1735 and extension with staircase	
Magstræde 17-19 and Nybrogade 30		Magstræde 17, 1204 København K	1752	Two front-gabled houses from the 17th century	
Magstræde 17-19 and Nybrogade 30		Nybrogade 30, 1203 København K		House from 1740 to 1780 which was altered in 1845	
Magstræde 18		Magstræde 18, 1204 København K	55°40′34.66″N 12°34′30.19″E	Building from c. 1730 with side wing and rear wing	
Magstræde 20		Magstræde 20, 1204 København K	55°40′34.55″N 12°34′29.9″E	Building from the 17th century which was heightened and rebuilt in brick in 1730–68, a staircase tower 1768 and rear wing from the 18th century which was heightened after 1728	
Møntergade 4		Møntergade 4, 1116 København K	1837	Building from 1730 to 1737 with extra height added in c. 1775 and staircase appendix from c. 1830	
Møntergade 6		Møntergade 6, 1116 København K	1837	Building with side wing from 1836 to 1837	
Møntergade 8		Møntergade 8, 1116 København K	1837	Building from 1730 to 1735 with extra height added and the facade rebuilt in brick between 1829 and 1832	
Møntergade 10		Møntergade 10, 1116 København K	1837	Building from 1732 with new facade in 1857	
Møntergade 12		Møntergade 12, 1116 København K	1837	Building with two side wings from 1730	
Møntergade 14		Møntergade 14, 1116 København K	1837	Building (with side wing) from between 1730 and 1736 but completely rebuilt in 1763	
Møntergade 14		Møntergade 14A, 1116 København K	1837	Rear wing	
Møntergade 16		Møntergade 16, 1116 København K	1837	Building with staircase and rear wing from the 1730s with extra height added in 1770	

=== N ===
Listing name	Image	Location	Coordinates	Summary	Ref.
Naboløs 1		Naboløs 1, 1206 København K	55°40′39.61″N 12°34′37.48″E	Corner building from 1798 to 1799 by H.C. Ondrup	
Naboløs 2		Naboløs 2, 1206 København K	55°40′39.4″N 12°34′36.83″E	Corner building with side wing from 1797 by Philip Lange and L.L. Thrane	
Naboløs 3		Naboløs 3, 1206 København K	55°40′39.3″N 12°34′37.72″E	Building from 1798 by H.C. Ondrup	
Naboløs 4 and Snaregade 4		Naboløs 4, 1206 København K	55°40′38.93″N 12°34′37.22″E	Building with side wing from 1802 af J.L. Thrane	
Naboløs 4 and Snaregade 4		Snaregade 4, 1205 København K	55°40′38.29″N 12°34′37″E	Building with side wing from 1802 af J.L. Thrane	
Naboløs 6: Henriette Melchiors Stiftelse		Naboløs 6, 1206 København K	55°40′38.59″N 12°34′37.5″E	Corner building from 1796 to 1797 whose facade was altered in 1829 and 1849	
Niels Hemmingsens Gade 3		Niels Hemmingsens Gade 3, 1153 København K	55°40′44.34″N 12°34′39.97″E	Building from 1736 which was altered and expanded with extra height in 1786	
Niels Hemmingsens Gade 23		Niels Hemmingsens Gade 23, 1153 København K		Building with side wing from c. 1730	
Niels Hemmingsens Gade 32		Niels Hemmingsens Gade 32, 1153 København K	55°40′49.03″N 12°34′34.04″E	Building from between 1739 and 1744 which was in 1853–54 as well as the side wing from between 1762 and 1777 which was altered in 1853–54 and expanded with extra height between 1869 and 1873	
Nikolaj Plads 3		Lille Kongensgade 34, 1074 København K	1837	Corner building; the western part dates from 1758 and the southern part dates from 1728 but was rebuilt in brick in 1830.	
Nikolaj Plads 5		Nikolaj Plads 5, 1067 København K	1837	Corner building from 1853 to 1854 by P.C. Hagemann.	
Nikolaj Plads 7		Nikolaj Plads 7, 1067 København K	1837	Building from 1848 to 1849 by P.C. Hagemann.	
Nikolaj Plads 9		Nikolaj Plads 9, 1067 København K	1837	Building from 1848 to 1849 by P.C. Hagemann.	
Nikolaj Plads 10		Nikolaj Plads 1+, 1067 København K	1837	Church tower from 1582 to c. 1600 with spire from 1907 to 1909.	
Nikolaj Plads 11		Nikolaj Plads 11, 1067 København K	1837	Building from 1848 to 1849 by P.C. Hagemann.	
Nikolaj Plads 15		Vingårdsstræde 22 and Nikolaj Plads 15, 1070 København K	1837	Corner building from 1848 to 1849 by P.C. Hagemann.	
Nikolaj Plads 23		Nikolaj Plads 23, 1067 København K	1837	Corner building from 1800 by H.C. Schmidt.	
Nikolaj Plads 27		Nikolaj Plads 27, 1067 København K	1837	Corner building from 1796 to 1797 and side wing from 1800.	
Nikolaj Plads 32: Sankt Nicolai Hus		Nikolaj Plads 32, 1067 København K	1837	Building with side wing, partly from 1796 by Andreas Hallander.	
Nikolajgade 17		Nikolajgade 17, 1068 København K	1837	Building from 1828 to 1829.	
Nikolajgade 18		Nikolajgade 18, 1068 København K	1837	Warehouse from 1817 to 1818	
Nikolajgade 19		Nikolajgade 19, 1068 København K	1837	Corner building from 1796 to 1797 by Andreas Kirkerup.	
Nikolajgade 20		Nikolajgade 20, 1068 København K	1837	Corner building from 1799 by A.C. Wilcken. Rebuilt after fire in 1855.	
Nikolajgade 22: Hald House		Nikolajgade 22, 1068 København K	1752	Corner building from 1799.	
Nikolajgade 22: Hald House		Dybensgade 19, 1071 København K		Warehouse from 1799.	
Nordre Toldbod 1: Visitationsbygningen and Lumskebugten		Nordre Toldbod 1, 1259 København K			
Nordre Toldbod 1: Visitationsbygningen and Lumskebugten		Nordre Toldbod 1, 1259 København K			
Nordre Toldbod 8: Port Authority Building		Nordre Toldbod 7, 1259 København K			
Nordre Toldbod 8: Port Authority Building		Nordre Toldbod 7, 1259 København K			
Nordre Toldbod 8: Port Authority Building		Nordre Toldbod 7, 1259 København K			
Nordre Toldbod 12: Løveport		Nordre Toldbod 12, 1259 København K		Building with arcade and the so-called Lion Gate, both from 1856 and designed by G.F. Hetsch.	
Nørre Voldgade 16		Nørre Voldgade 16, 1358 København K	1837	Building with side wing from 1836 to 1837.	
Nørre Voldgade 22		Nørre Voldgade 22, 1358 København K	1800	Corner building from 1852 to 1853 by J.K. Gyldendal.	
Nørre Voldgade 102		Nørre Voldgade 102, 1358 København K		Building from 1857.	
Nørre Voldgade 104		Nørre Voldgade 104, 1358 København K		Corner building from 1857.	
Nørregade 4		Nørregade 4, 1165 København K		Building with side wing from 1811.	
Nørregade 6		Nørregade 6, 1165 København K			
Nørregade 6		Nørregade 6, 1165 København K	c. 1732		
Nørregade 10: Kommunitetsbygningen and Professorboligen		Nørregade 10, 1165 København K	1731	Kommunitetsbygningen from 1731	
Nørregade 10: Kommunitetsbygningen and Professorboligen		Nørregade 10, 1165 København K	c. 1732	Professorboligen from c. 1732 by Johan Cornelius Krieger	
Nørregade 11: Bispegården		Nørregade 11, 1165 København K	1896	Building originally from 1731 to 1732 but adapted in 1896 by Martin Nyrop	
Nørregade 13: Povl Badstuber House		Nørregade 13, 1165 København K	1732	House with lisenes and rounded pediment from 1730 to 1732	
Nørregade 18		Nørregade 18, 1165 København K	1732	Neoclassical building from 1834 to 1835	
Nørregade 27 and Nørregade 29		Nørregade 27, 1165 København K	1732	Neoclassical building from 1832.	
Nørregade 27 and Nørregade 29	Nørregade 20, 1655 Københavns K	Nørregade 27, 1165 København K	1732	Neoclassical building from 1808.	
Nørregade 31		Nørregade 19, 1165 København K	1732	Neoclassical building from 1832 to 1833 by C.F. Weber.	
Nørregade 33		Nørregade 33, 1165 København K	1732	Neoclassical building from 1831 to 1832, including an 11-bays-long side wing in the courtyard.	
Ny Kongensgade 1: Barchmann Mansion		Ny Kongensgade 1, 1472 København K	1740	Noble town mansion on the corner of Ny Kongensgade with Frederiksholms Kanal from 1740 by Philip de Lange	
Ny Kongensgade 1: Barchmann Mansion		Ny Kongensgade 1, 1472 København K		Three-storey, five bay side wing fronting Ny Kongensgade	
Ny Kongensgade 3		Ny Kongensgade 3, 1472 København K		Building with side wing from 1757, altered in 1916 by Bent Helweg-Møller with addition of staircase tower	
Ny Kongensgade 5		Ny Kongensgade 5, 1472 København K		Building from before 1732 but extended with an extra floor in the 1740s and the frontage dressed in the 1860s as well as the side wing from 1751 and the retirade from the early 19th century	
Ny Kongensgade 6		Ny Kongensgade 6, 1472 København K	1754	Building from 1754	
Ny Kongensgade 7		Ny Kongensgade 7, 1472 København K		Building fronting the street from 1769, side wing from the 1770s and rear wing from 1813	
Ny Kongensgade 9		Ny Kongensgade 9, 1472 København K	1804	House and side wing from 1804	
Ny Kongensgade 11		Ny Kongensgade 11, 1472 København K	1730s	House and half-timbered side wing from the 1730s	
Ny Østergade 2: Svane Apotek		Ny Østergade 2, 1101 København K	1934	Former pharmacy from 1934 by Bent Helweg-Møller and ingeniører C.N. Nøkkentved and Svend Friis Jespersen	
Ny Vestergade 9		Ny Vestergade 9, 1471 København K		Building from c. 1700 (adapted in 1771–73) with its eastern and western side wings from before 1770	
Ny Vestergade 11		Ny Vestergade 11, 1471 København K	1858	Building originally from 1821 but adapted in 1858 to design by Niels Sigfred Nebelong	
Ny Vestergade 11		Ny Vestergade 11, 1471 København K		L-shaped building in the courtyard built as the new chemical laboratory at University of Copenhagen in 1857–59 to design by Niels Sigfred Nebelong	
Ny Vestergade 13		Ny Vestergade 13, 1471 København K	1792	Building originally from 1792 but expanded with an extra floor in 1857 and the small appendix to the rear	
Ny Adelgade 6-6 A		Ny Adelgade 6, 1104 København K		Building from 1738. The gabled wall dormer was added some time between 1802 and 1837.	
Ny Adelgade 6-6 A		Ny Adelgade 6, 1104 København K		Rear wing from 1738.	
Ny Adelgade 9		Ny Adelgade 9, 1104 København K		Corner building from 1802 to 1803.	
Nyboder					
Nyboder		Store Kongensgade 121, 1264 København K		Residential row built in 1791–1792 by Caspar Frederik Harsdorff	
Nybrogade 4: Pæretræet		Nybrogade 4, 1203 København K	1700	Building from 1729 to 1730 (extra floor added in 1846) with side wing from 1729	
Nybrogade 6 og Snaregade 3		Nybrogade 6, 1203 København K		Building fronting Nybrogade from 1762 to 1784, expanded with extra jeight in 1797, 1828 and 1845	
Nybrogade 6 og Snaregade 3		Nybrogade 6, 1203 København K		Building fronting Snarehade from 1733 which was shortened by six bays in 1845	
Nybrogade 6 og Snaregade 3		Nybrogade 6, 1203 København K		Side wing	
Nybrogade 8/Snaregade 5		Nybrogade 8, 1203 København K	1700	Nybrogade 8: House with side wing from 1768 (expanded with an extra floor in 1843); Snaregade 5: Building from 1730 to 1732 (expanded with extra floor in 1768) with northern side wing from between 1732 and 1764) samt sidehus i syd (mellem 1768 og 1784)	
Nybrogade 10 / Snaregade 7		Nybrogade 10, 1203 København K		Nybrogade 10: Building from c. 1740 (expanded with extra floor and altered in 1853–54) with 18th-century side wing; Snaregade 7: Building from 1853 to 1854	
Nybrogade 12: Ziegler House		Nybrogade 12, 1203 København K		Four-winged complex from 1732 to 1748 by Philip de Lange	
Nybrogade 16 / Magstræde 3		Nybrogade 10, 1203 København K		The two buildings fronting Nybrogade and Magstræde from 1734 to 1735 and the staircase building from between 1745 and 1790	
Nybrogade 18		Nybrogade 18, 1203 København K		Building with side wing from 1732 with an extra floor added in 1854	
Nybrogade 20		Nybrogade 20, 1203 København K		Building from 1731	
Nybrogade 22 og Magstræde 9		Nybrogade 22, 1203 København K		Building with side wing from 1852 to 1853	
Nybrogade 22 og Magstræde 9		Magstræde 9, 1204 København K		Building from 1755	
Nybrogade 24 and Magstræde 11		Nybrogade 24, 1203 København K		Nybrogade 24: Building with side wing from 1815 to 1817 which was expanded with an extra storey in 1853; Magstræde 11: Building from the 18th century which was rebuilt in 1815–17	
Nybrogade 26 and Magstræde 13		Nybrogade 20, 1203 København K		Nybrogade 26: Building originally from the 18th century but altered in 1827 and later; Magstræde 13: Building from 1808 to 1809 with extra height added in 1827	
Nybrogade 28 and Magstræde 15		Nybrogade 27, 1203 København K		Nybrogade 28: Building from 1852; Magstræde 15: Building from 1731 to 1732 which was expanded with extra height in 1852	
Nyhavn 1		Nyhavn 1, 1051 København K		Corner building from 1753 with walls along Nyhavn; Store Strandstræde 2: Building from before 1731, merged with the corner building in 1817	
Nyhavn 2: Charlottenborg Exhibition Building1		Nyhavn 2, 1051 København K		Three-winged complexfrom 1883 by Ferdinand Meldahl and Albert Jensen, Billedhuggerhaven from 1777 and the garden along Heibergsgade	
Nyhavn 3		Nyhavn 3, 1051 København K		Building from the 17th century which was altered 1738, 1776 and 1852 as well as the staircase wing from c. 1800	
Nyhavn 5		Nyhavn 5, 1051 København K		Building from c. 1770	
Nyhavn 6 Nyhavn 6		Nyhavn 5, 1051 København K		Building from c. 1770	
Nyhavn 7		Nyhavn 7, 1051 København K		House from the 17th century which was altered and expanded with extra height in 1846 as well as the rear wing and the three-bay staircase wing that defines the small, triangular courtyard	
Nyhavn 8		Nyhavn 8, 1051 København K		Building from 1774 (expanded with an extra storey in 1846) and side wing from 1774	
Nyhavn 9		Nyhavn 9, 1051 København K	1700	Building from 1681	
Nyhavn 9		Nyhavn 9A, 1051 København K		Rear wing and cross wing from before 1729	
Nyhavn 10 and Nyhavn 12		Nyhavn 10, 1051 København K	1752	Building from 1772 to 1773 which was expanded wgose wall dormer was expanded to a full storey in 1850 and the six-bay side wing from 1772 to 1773 which was expanded with extra height in 1850	
Nyhavn 10 and Nyhavn 12		Nyhavn 12D, 1051 København K		Building from c. 1770 with 13-bat side wing from 1796	
Nyhavn 11		Nyhavn 11, 1051 København K	1700	Building from 1835 to 1836	
Nyhavn 13		Nyhavn 13, 1051 København K	1700	Building from c. 1690 with dormer replaced by the two uppermost floors in 1842	
Nyhavn 14–16: Den Sorte Ravn		Nyhavn 14, 1051 København K	1700	Two buildings from 1755 with later alterations	
Nyhavn 14–16: Den Sorte Ravn		Nyhavn 14, 1051 København K		L-shaped rear wing	
Nyhavn 15		Nyhavn 15, 1051 København K	1700	Building from the 17th century which was expanded with an extra floor in 1851	
Nyhavn 17		Nyhavn 17, 1051 København K	1700	Building towards Nyhavn from the late 17th century but rebuilt in brick and expanded with extra height in the mid-18th century and side wing towards Lille Strandstræde from 1786	
Nyhavn 18		Nyhavn 18, 1051 København K	1700	Building from c. 1779 with wall dormer converted into a full storey in 1846 by C. Unger	
Nyhavn 19		Nyhavn 19, 1254 København K		Corner building from 1713 which was heightened between 1766 and 1787 med with staircase extension from between 1787 and 1801	
Nyhavn 20		Nyhavn 20, 1051 København K	1700	Building from c. 1780	
Nyhavn 21 and Lille Strandstræde 4		Nyhavn 21, 1254 København K		Building from the 17th century which was expanded with an extra storey in 1793, a staircase tower from 1850 and rear wing from 1748; building fronting Lille Strandstræde from 1789 with extension from 1843	
Nyhavn 22		Nyhavn 22, 1051 København K	1700	Building from 1778 to 1779 by Samuel Blichfeldt	
Nyhavn 23		Nyhavn 23, 1051 København K	1700	Building with side wing from 1803	
>Nyhavn 25		Nyhavn 23, 1051 København K		Townhouse from c. 1730, which was heightened with one storey in c. 1790	
Nyhavn 27		Nyhavn 27, 1051 København K		Building from c. 1700 which was expanded heightwise in 1784 and lengthwise in 1789	
Nyhavn 29		Nyhavn 29, 1051 København K		Building with eastern side wing from c. 1730	
Nyhavn 31		Nyhavn 31A, 1051 København K		Building from c. 1700 with extra height added in 1731 as well as the two consecutive side wings from c. 1800 and the first half of the 17th century	
Nyhavn 33		Nyhavn 33, 1051 København K			
Nyhavn 35		Nyhavn 35, 1051 København K			
Nyhavn 37		Nyhavn 37, 1051 København K		Building from c. 1700 which was expanded with an extra storey in 1791	
Nyhavn 39		Nyhavn 39, 1051 København K		Building from c. 1700 which was expanded with an extra storey in 1850	
Nyhavn 41		Nyhavn 41, 1051 København K		Building from 1698 with wall dormer expanded into fill storey and new dormer added in c. 1752 as well as the side and rear wings	
Nyhavn 43		Nyhavn 43, 1051 København K		Building from c. 1787 which was altered in 1874	
Nyhavn 45		Nyhavn 45, 1051 København K		Building from 1740 which was expanded with an extra storey in 1794 as well as the side wing from 1794, rear wing from 1794, the cobbled courtyard and the wall towards the neighbour	
Nyhavn 47		Nyhavn 47, 1051 København K		Corner building with side wing and wall on Nyhavn from 1737 to 1738 and later altered in 1845 by J.A. Blom	
Nyhavn 49		Nyhavn 49, 1051 København K		Corner building from 1746 which was expanded with an extra floor in 1886	
Nyhavn 51		Nyhavn 51, 1051 København K	1700	House from 1766	
Nyhavn 53		Nyhavn 53, 1051 København K	1754	House fronting the street originally built in 1753–54 but extended with an extra floor in 1874	
Nyhavn 53		Nyhavn 53 B, 1051 København K		Side wing attached to the building fronting the street	
Nyhavn 55		Nyhavn 55, 1051 København K	1700	House from c. 1700 (altered in 1906) and southeastern side wing originally built with timber framing before 1756 but later partly rebuilt in brick	
Nyhavn 57		Nyhavn 57, 1051 København K	1700	House from c. 1690 and ca. 1850–60 and the attached side wing	
Nyhavn 59: The Alchemist's House		Nyhavn 59, 1051 København K	1700	Building from 1689 and later with side and rear wings	
Nyhavn 61		Nyhavn 61, 1051 København K	1700	Building from c. 1700 and later with side and rear wings	
Nyhavn 63		Nyhavn 63, 1051 København K	1700	Building complex surrounding an interior complex, possibly from 1756 but rebuilt in c. 1770	
Nyhavn 65: Mahnfeldt House		Nyhavn 65, 1051 København K		House fronting the street from 1737, western side wing from between 1739 and 1756, eastern side wing from between 1756 and 1801, western rear wing from 1731 and eastern rear wing from c. 1700	
Nyhavn 67: Nyhavn 67		Nyhavn 67, 1051 København K			
Nyhavn 71: Suhr Warehouse		Nyhavn 71, 1051 København K	1837	Former warehouse from 1805	
Nytorv 5: Frisch House		Nytorv 5, 1450 København K	1700	House from 1799 to 1803 by Nicolai Abildgaard	
Nytorv 7: Jens Lauritzen House		Nytorv 7, 1450 København K		Neoclassical house from 1795 to 1796, possibly designed by Andreas Kirkerup	
Nytorv 7: Jens Lauritzen House		Nytorv 7, 1450 København K		Side wing from 1796. Four-storey, five-bay warehouse from 1796.	
Nytorv 7: Jens Lauritzen House		Nytorv 7B, 1450 København K		Rear wing from 1795. Four-storey, five-bay warehouse from 1796.	
Nytorv 9		Nytorv 9, 1450 København K	1700	Building with side wing from 1796 to 1797	
Nytorv 15 and Rådhusstræde 2 A-B		Nytorv 15, 1450 København K		Corner building from 1796 to 1797 and the building at Rådhusstræde 2 from 1798 with wall and gate	
Nytorv 17: Krak House		Nytorv 17, 1450 København K		Building from 1795 to 1796	
Nytorv 19		Nytorv 19, 1450 København K		Building with side wing and staircase building from 1797	
Nytorv 21: Copenhagen Jailhouse		Nytorv 5, 1450 København K		Building complex at the corner of Slutterigade and Hestemøllestræde from 1805 to 1815 by Christian Frederik Hansen (restored and adapted in 1938–42 by Kaj Gottlob) as well as the detached building on the corner with Nytorv from 1888 to 1889, probably designed by Ludvig Fenger	
Nytorv 25: Copenhagen Court House		Nytorv 25, 1450 København K		Courthouse and former city hall from 1805 to 1815 by Christian Frederik Hansen	

=== O/Ø ===
Listing name	Image	Location	Coordinates	Description
Olfert Fischers Gade 5		Olfert Fischers Gade 5, 1311 København K	55°41′11.75″N 12°35′19.15″E	Townhouse from the early 17th century
Olfert Fischers Gade 7		Olfert Fischers Gade 7, 1311 København K	55°41′11.92″N 12°35′18.46″E	Two townhouses; the eastern house dates from before 1740 but was expanded with an extra floor some time between 1740 and 1766, and the western house dates from before 1767 but with a mansard roof from between 1767 and 1788 as well as a half-timbered wall.
Øster Voldgade 3: Østervold Observatory		Øster Voldgade 3, 1350 København K	55°41′12.49″N 12°34′33.38″E	Astronomical observatory from 1859 to 1861 by Christian Hansen
Øster Voldgade 4A: Rosenborg Castle		Øster Voldgade 4A, 1350 København K	1752	Castle from 1606 to 1617 designed by Christian IV and possibly Willum Cornelissen; staircase tower added from 1633 to 1634, probably designed by Hans van Steenwinckel the Younger
Øster Voldgade 4A: Rosenborg Castle		Øster Voldgade 4A, 1350 København K		Gatehouse from c. 1610 med with extensions to the southwest and northeast from c. 1680
Øster Voldgade 4A: Rosenborg Castle		Øster Voldgade 4A, 1350 København K		Kommandantboligen: Residence from 1760 to 1763 by Jacob Fortling
Øster Voldgade 4A: Rosenborg Castle		Øster Voldgade 4A, 1350 København K		Former stables
Øster Voldgade 4B: Slotsforvalterboligen		Øster Voldgade 4A, 1350 København K	1752	Huse from 1688, which was expanded with an extra storey in 1777 with a single storey side wing from the late 18th century
Øster Voldgade 4B: Slotsforvalterboligen		Øster Voldgade 4A, 1350 København K		Building to the rear from c. 1850
Øster Voldgade 4B: Slotsforvalterboligen		Øster Voldgade 4A, 1350 København K		Gardener's House: Single-storey wing from the late 17th century with hibernation house from the late 18th century

=== P ===
Listing name	Image	Location	Coordinates	Summary
Peder Hvitfeldts Stræde 10		Peder Hvitfeldts Stræde 10, 1173 København K	55°40′54.1″N 12°34′26.57″E	Building with two short side wings from 1811 by J.H. Breede
Peder Hvitfeldts Stræde 12		Peder Hvitfeldts Stræde 12, 1173 København K	55°40′54.44″N 12°34′26.33″E	Building with two side wings from 1809 to 1818
Peder Hvitfeldts Stræde 13		Peder Hvitfeldts Stræde 13, 1173 København K	55°40′54.94″N 12°34′25.01″E	Building with northern side wing from 1832
Pilestræde 33		Pilestræde 33, 1112 København K	55°40′50.39″N 12°34′49.04″E	Building from 1745 (altered 1851) with side wing and rear wing
Pilestræde 37		Pilestræde 37, 1112 København K	55°40′51.19″N 12°34′46.91″E	Building from 1784 to 1786 by J. Boye Junge
Pilestræde 39		Pilestræde 39, 1112 København K	55°40′51.79″N 12°34′46.25″E	Building and side wing from 1784 to 1786 by J. Boye Junge which was altered in 1901
Pilestræde 40 / Sværtegade 1		Sværtegade 1A, 1112 København K	55°40′51.58″N 12°34′48.73″E	Corner building from 1728 by Gotfrid Schuster with elements from Christian IV's Gjethus from 1610 with extra height added in 1812 and 1850
Pilestræde 41–45		Pilestræde 41, 1112 København K	55°40′51.95″N 12°34′45.73″E	Building from 1784 to 1786 by J. Boye Junge
Pilestræde 41–45		Pilestræde 43, 1112 København K	55°40′52.09″N 12°34′45.29″E	Building from 1784 to 1785 by J. Boye Junge
Pilestræde 41–45		Pilestræde 45, 1112 København K	55°40′52.24″N 12°34′44.81″E	Building from 1784 to 1785 by J. Boye Junge
Pilestræde 42–44		Pilestræde 42, 1112 København K	55°40′51.82″N 12°34′47.82″E	Part of Christian IV's Gjæthus: Rebuilt in 1735, expanded with extra height between 1770 and 1798, facade altered in 1854
Pilestræde 42–44		Pilestræde 44, 1112 København K	55°40′51.94″N 12°34′47.45″E	Part of Christian IV's Gjæthus from 1610: Refurbished in 1728, expanded with extra height in 1785 and 1829 and facade altered in 1829
Pilestræde 47		Pilestræde 47, 1112 København K	55°40′52.43″N 12°34′44.27″E	Building on Pilestræde and Klareboderne from c. 1780–90

=== R ===
Listing name	Image	Location	Coordinates	Description
Rådhusstræde 1		Rådhusstræde 1, 1466 København K	55°40′37.93″N 12°34′26.67″E	Corner building from 1797 to 1798 by Andreas Hallander and Brolæggerstræde 13 which was completely altered in 1851
Rådhusstræde 3		Rådhusstræde 3, 1466 København K	55°40′37.43″N 12°34′27.16″E	Complex from 1796 to 1797 and the cobbled courtyard
Rådhusstræde 5		Rådhusstræde 5, 1466 København K	55°40′37.07″N 12°34′27.44″E	Building from 1795 to 1796 (extra floor added in 1830)
Rådhusstræde 6		Rådhusstræde 6, 1466 København K	55°40′36.17″N 12°34′26.86″E	Corner building from 1797 by Andreas Hallander
Rådhusstræde 7		Rådhusstræde 7, 1466 København K	55°40′36.56″N 12°34′27.86″E	Building on Rådhusstræde and Kompagnistræde from 1797 to 1798 with the northwestern side wing
Rådhusstræde 8		Rådhusstræde 8, 1466 København K	55°40′36.56″N 12°34′27.86″E	Building on Rådhusstræde and Kompagnistræde from 1783 to 1784 by Andreas Wilhelm Egeroed which was expanded with extra height in 1846
Rådhusstræde 9		Rådhusstræde 9, 1466 København K	55°40′35.35″N 12°34′27.67″E	Corner building originally from 1734 but altered in 1844
Rådhusstræde 10		Rådhusstræde 10, 1466 København K	55°40′34.9″N 12°34′28.08″E	Corner building from 1750 with staircase tower from 1750 and 1835, rear wing from 1835, side wing with gable facing the street from 1851 as well as the wall along Rådhusstræde from 1797 and 1851
Rådhusstræde 11		Rådhusstræde 11, 1466 København K	55°40′35.53″N 12°34′28.64″E	Building from c. 1730
Rådhusstræde 13: Huset KBH		Rådhusstræde 13, 1466 København K	55°40′35.08″N 12°34′29.02″E	Building originally from c. 1740 but strongly altered in 1852–53
Rådhusstræde 15		Rådhusstræde 15, 1466 København K	55°40′34.78″N 12°34′29.27″E	Building from 1730 to 1732 which was altered in 1888
Rådhusstræde 17		Rådhusstræde 17, 1466 København K	c. 1700	Corner building with side wing from c. 1700
Rosenborggade 7–9		Rosenborggade 7, 1130 København K		No. 7 from 1847 and No. 9 from 1810, expanded with two extra floors in 1846–47
Rosenborggade 10		Rosenborggade 10, 1130 København K		Building from 1801 by L.L. Thrane
Rosenborggade 12: Pjaltenborg		Rosenborggade 12, 1130 København K		Corner building from c. 1850
Rosenborggade 12: Pjaltenborg		Rosenborggade 12, 1130 København K		Washhouse in the courtyard
Rosenborggade 19 and Gothersgade 113		Rosenborggade 19, 1130 København K		Corner building from 1766 by Jacob Iwers
Rosenborggade 19 and Gothersgade 113		Gothersgade 113, 1123 København K		Two-storey building on Gothersgade from 1825
Rosengården 5		Rosengården 5, 1174 København K		Building from 1844 to 1845
Rosengården 6		Rosengården 6, 1174 København K		Building with side wing from 1810 to 1811 by Henrik Thyberg
Rosengården 7		Rosengården 7, 1174 København K		Building from 1844 to 1845
Rosengården 13		Rosengården 13, 1174 København K		Building with side wing from 1841 to 1842

=== S ===
Listing name	Image	Location	Coordinates	Description
Sankt Annæ Plads 1–3		Sankt Annæ Plads 1, 1250 København K	55°40′56.4″N 12°35′22.04″E	Four-storey building from 1847 to 1849 by Gustav Friedrich Hetsch
Sankt Annæ Plads 1–3		Sankt Annæ Plads 3, 1250 København K	55°40′56.4″N 12°35′22.04″E	The part of the side wing that is of the same height as the main wing
Sankt Annæ Plads 5		Sankt Annæ Plads 5, 1250 København K	55°40′56.26″N 12°35′22.58″E	House from 1796 by Jørgen Henrich Rawert
Sankt Annæ Plads 6		Sankt Annæ Plads 5, 1250 København K	55°40′53.65″N 12°35′25.99″E	House with small appendix from c. 1760 and extension towards Sankt Annæ Plads
Sankt Annæ Plads 7		Sankt Annæ Plads 7, 1250 København K	55°40′55.88″N 12°35′23.93″E	Building from c. 1750 by Niels Eigtved, adapted in c. 1850
Sankt Annæ Plads 9		Sankt Annæ Plads 9, 1250 København K	55°40′55.72″N 12°35′24.49″E	Building with six-bay side wing from c. 1750 by Niels Eigtved, adapted in c. 1850
Sankt Annæ Plads 10		Sankt Annæ Plads 10A, 1250 København K	55°40′53.21″N 12°35′27.71″E	Building from 1785 by Andreas Hallander. The rear side of an older building has partly been retained, although it was heightened in 1875.
Sankt Annæ Plads 10		Sankt Annæ Plads 10B, 1250 København K	55°40′52.82″N 12°35′27.43″E	Eight-bay side wing from 1757
Sankt Annæ Plads 10		Sankt Annæ Plads 10B, 1250 København K	55°40′52.82″N 12°35′27.43″E	"The Temple". Attached exhibition building from 1875
Sankt Annæ Plads 10		Sankt Annæ Plads 10C, 1250 København K	55°40′52.39″N 12°35′27.89″E	Six-storey residential building from 1873 attached to the exhibition building
Sankt Annæ Plads 11		Sankt Annæ Plads 11, 1250 København K	55°40′55.44″N 12°35′25.54″E	House with side wing and rear wing from 1801 by Jørgen Henrich Rawert
Sankt Annæ Plads 13: Prince William Mansion		Sankt Annæ Plads 13, 1250 København K	55°40′54.95″N 12°35′27.36″E	Building at the corner of Amaliegade from c. 1750 with later alterations
Sankt Gertruds Stræde 3		Sankt Gertruds Stræde 3, 1129 København K	55°40′58.91″N 12°34′27.28″E	Building from 1844
Sankt Gertruds Stræde 4		Sankt Gertruds Stræde 4, 1129 København K	55°40′58.73″N 12°34′28.01″E	Building from 1815
Sankt Gertruds Stræde 6		Sankt Gertruds Stræde 6, 1129 København K	55°40′59.01″N 12°34′27.88″E	Building from 1736 to 1737 which was altered and expanded with extra height in 1838
Sankt Gertruds Stræde 8		Sankt Gertruds Stræde 8, 1129 København K	55°40′59.67″N 12°34′27.71″E	Forhus mod nord (1735) med side- og baghus (ombygget i slutn. af 1800-tallet), forhus mod syd (1735, forhøjet i slutn. af 1700-tallet) med side- og baghus (slutn. af 1700-tallet, ombygget 1816–36)
Sankt Gertruds Stræde 10		Sankt Gertruds Stræde 10, 1129 København K	55°41′0.17″N 12°34′27.58″E	House fronting the street from c. 1740 which was expanded with extra height in 1866
Sankt Gertruds Stræde 10		Sankt Gertruds Stræde 10, 1129 København K	55°41′0.17″N 12°34′27.58″E	Seven-bay side wing from between 1730 and 1757
Sankt Gertruds Stræde 10		Sankt Gertruds Stræde 10, 1129 København K	55°41′0.17″N 12°34′27.58″E	Five-bay sid wing from 1826
Sankt Gertruds Stræde 10		Sankt Gertruds Stræde 10, 1129 København K	55°41′0.17″N 12°34′27.58″E	Rear wing from between 1730 and 1757 with extra height added in 1861
Sankt Peders Stræde 2: St. Peter's Church		Sankt Peders Stræde 2, 1453 København K	55°40′47.54″N 12°34′15.11″E	Church
Sankt Peders Stræde 2: St. Peter's Church		Sankt Peders Stræde 2, 1453 København K	55°40′47.54″N 12°34′15.11″E	Burial chapel from 1681 to 1683 by Hans van Steenwinckel the Youngest
Sankt Peders Stræde 17		Sankt Peders Stræde 17, 1453 København K	55°40′45.75″N 12°34′12.2″E	Five-bay building from 1809 and 1834
Sankt Peders Stræde 18		Sankt Peders Stræde 17, 1453 København K	55°40′44.74″N 12°34′6.59″E	Corner building from 1797 to 1798
Sankt Peders Stræde 27		Sankt Peders Stræde 27, 1453 København K	55°40′45.02″N 12°34′9.75″E	Building fronting the street from 1808 to 1809 and side wing
Sankt Peders Stræde 28: Pakhusgaarden		Sankt Peders Stræde 28, 1453 København K	55°40′44.09″N 12°34′3.79″E	Corner building from 1797 to 1798
Sankt Peders Stræde 29-31		Sankt Peders Stræde 29, 1453 København K	55°40′44.86″N 12°34′9.14″E	Building with three-bay side wing from 1796
Sankt Peders Stræde 29-31		Sankt Peders Stræde 29B, 1453 København K	55°40′44.02″N 12°34′9.29″E	Corner building from 1796
Sankt Peders Stræde 32		Sankt Peders Stræde 32, 1453 København K	55°40′43.85″N 12°34′2.36″E	Corner building from 1797
Sankt Peders Stræde 41		Sankt Peders Stræde 41, 1453 København K	55°40′43.7″N 12°34′4.55″E	Building with side wing from 1796 to 1797
Silkegade 8: Sparekassen Bikuben		Silkegade 8, 1113 København K		Former saving bank headquarters consisting of a four-winged building from 1881 to 1884 by Johan Daniel Herholdt, a corner building from 1927 to 1929 by Gotfred Tvede), an extension from 1959 by Poul Kjærgaard and the interior courtyard
Skindergade 5. Pressens Hus		Skindergade 5, 1159 København K	1734	Extension to Pressens Hus from 1976 by rik Korshagen
Skindergade 6		Skindergade 6, 1159 København K	1734	Building fronting the street and attached 10-bay, half-timbered side wing from 1730 to 1734
Skindergade 8		Skindergade 8, 1159 København K	1734	Half-timbered building from 1733
Skindergade 13		Skindergade 13, 1159 København K	1734	Half-timbered building from 1733
Skindergade 19		Skindergade 19, 1159 København K	1734	Corner building from c. 1835
Skindergade 21		Skindergade 21, 1159 København K	1734	Building with side wing from 1833 to 1834
Skindergade 22		Skindergade 22, 1159 København K	1734	Corner building from 1837 to 1838 by Thomas Blom
Skindergade 23		Skindergade 23, 1159 København K	1734	Building from 1831
Skindergade 32/Fiolstræde 2		Skindergade 32, 1159 København K	1734	Corner building from 1837 to 1838 by Thomas Blom
Skindergade 34: Soldins Stiftelse		Skindergade 34, 1159 København K	1734	Complex from 1812 to 1815 by Christian Frederik Hansen consisting of a main wing fronting Skindergade and two short side wings and a wall fronting Dyrkøb
Skindergade 36: N. J. Frænkels Alderdomshjem		Skindergade 36, 1159 København K		Buildings at Dyrkøb 3 priginally from 1813 to 1814 but expanded with three extra floors in 1850–51; and the building at Skindergade 36 from 1813, begge af Jens Hansen
Skindergade 38 and Dyrkøb 5		Skindergade 38, 1159 København K	1734	Building at Dyrkøb 5 from 1812 to 1814 and building at Skindergade 38 from 1820 to 1822
Skindergade 40		Skindergade 40, 1159 København K	1734	Building from 1817 which was expanded with an extra floor in 1851-52
Skindergade 42		Skindergade 42, 1159 København K	1734	Building from 1810 to 1811 by Henrich Scholle
Skindergade 44		Skindergade 44, 1159 København K	1734	Building from 1798 to 1799
Snaregade 1: Royal Pawn		Snaregade 1, 1205 København K		Four-winged complex originally from 1729 to 30 but adapted in 1765 by Philip de Lange and wing along Snaregade
Snaregade 6		Snaregade 6, 1205 København K	1752	Building from 1798 to 1799 by Poul Egeroed
Snaregade 8		Snaregade 8, 1205 København K		Building with side wing and rear wing from 1806 to 1807 by Poul Egeroed
Snaregade 10		Snaregade 10, 1205 København K		Building with side wing and rear wing from 1797 by Johan Martin Quist
Snaregade 12–14 and Knabrostræde 23		Knabrostræde 23, 1210 København K	1752	Former warehouse from 1810 to 1813
Snaregade 12–14 and Knabrostræde 23		Snaregade 12, 1205 København K		Three-storey building from 1795 to 1798 by Michael Bälckow
Snaregade 12–14 and Knabrostræde 23		Snaregade 14, 1205 København K		Three-storey building from 1795 to 1798 by Michael Bälckow
Sølvgade 16: Sølvgade School		Sølvgade 16, 1307 København K	1847	Main building from 1846 to 1847 by P.C. Hagemann, fence on Sølvgade from 1864 and the Robinia pseudoacacia tree and flag pole in the schoolyard
Sølvgade 20		Sølvgade 20, 1307 København K	1831	Building with two side wings 1826–27 by Thomas Blom
Sølvgade 22		Sølvgade 22, 1307 København K	1831	Building fronting the street with two side wings from 1830 to 1831 by Thomas Blom
Sølvgade 30 (5)		Sølvgade 39, 1307 København K	1831	Building from 1853
Sølvgade 34		Sølvgade 34, 1307 København K	1831	Building with side wing from 1834
Sølvgade 38: Holmblad House		Sølvgade 38, 1307 København K	1776	House with side wing from 1776
Sølvgade 38: Holmblad House		Sølvgade 38, 1307 København K	1776	Attached storage building from 1776
Sølvgade 40: Sølvgade Barracks		Sølvgade 40, 1307 København K	1771	Baroque-style barracks complex from 1765 to 1771 by Nicolas-Henri Jardin
Store Kannikestræde 2: Regensen		Store Kannikestræde 2, 1169 København K	1736	Four-winged hall of residence; the wing on Store Kannikestræde dates from 1623 to 1628 (rebuilt after the Copenhagen Fire of 1728 and refurbished in 1749, one storey added in 1777); the wing on Krystalgade dates from 1731 and the "chapel wing" date from 1743 (colonnade added in 1906–09).
Store Kannikestræde 6		Store Kannikestræde 6, 1169 København K	1736	Building fronting the streetfrom 1734–37 (one storey added in 1790), a four-bay side wing, a five-bay rear wing and a one-bay side wing
Store Kannikestræde 8		Store Kannikestræde 8, 1169 København K	1736	Building with side wing from the 1730s which was expanded with one storey in the 1790s
Store Kannikestræde 9: Elers' Kollegium		Store Kannikestræde 9, 1169 København K	1851	Building from 1702 to 1705 by Johan Conrad Ernst
Store Kannikestræde 9: Elers' Kollegium		Skindergade 10, 1159 København K	1850	Garden pavilion from 1730 by Johan Cornelius Krieger
Store Kannikestræde 9: Elers' Kollegium		Skindergade 10, 1159 København K	1850	Garden pavilion from 1730 by Johan Cornelius Krieger
Store Kannikestræde 10: Admiral Gjeddes Gård		Store Kannikestræde 10, 1169 København K	1736	Complex from 1730 to 1736 (wall dormer expanded from three to five bays in 1746) and rear wing with staircase tower
Store Kannikestræde 11: Professorgården		Store Kannikestræde 11, 1169 København K	1851	Building from 1752 to 1753 by Joachim Frederik Ramus
Store Kannikestræde 11: Professorgården		Store Kannikestræde 11, 1169 København K	1850	Building in the courtyard from 1752 to 1753 by Joachim Frederik Ramus
Store Kannikestræde 12: Borchs Kollegium		Store Kannikestræde 10, 1169 København K		Building from 1824 to 1825 by Peder Malling
Store Kannikestræde 13		Store Kannikestræde 13, 1169 København K	1736	Building from 1752 to 1753 by Joachim Frederik Ramus (wall dormer expanded into full storey in 1869)
Store Kannikestræde 15		Store Kannikestræde 15, 1169 København K	1736	Corner building from 1828 to 1829 by C.O. Aagaard
Store Kongensgade23 and Store Kongensgade 23 B (Bernhard Hertz' Jewellery Factory=		Store Kongensgade 23, 1264 København K	1851	Building from 1850 to 1851 by C.O. Aagaard, part of Bernhard Hertz 's former silver factory
Store Kongensgade23 and Store Kongensgade 23 B (Bernhard Hertz' Jewellery Factory=		Store Kongensgade 23A, 1264 København K	1850	Five-bay silver factory building from 1850 by Bernhard Hertz
Store Kongensgade 56 and Dronningens Tværgade 11		Dronningens Tværgade 11, 1302 København K	1782	Corner building from before 1754 and 1808 (altered in 1846) with side wing
Store Kongensgade 59		Store Kongensgade 59A, 1264 København K	1782	House from 1782 and later
Store Kongensgade 62		Store Kongensgade 62A, 1264 København K	1796	House with side wing from 1807
Store Kongensgade 62		Store Kongensgade 62A, 1264 København K	1850	Detached rear wing built 1808 and extended with extra floor in 1835
Store Kongensgade 67: Mechanicus Kretz' House		Store Kongensgade 67A, 1264 København K	1851	Building from 1836 to 1838
Store Kongensgade 67: Mechanicus Kretz' House		Store Kongensgade 67B, 1264 København K	1850	Five-bay silver factory building from 1850 by Bernhard Hertz
Store Kongensgade 67: Mechanicus Kretz' House		Store Kongensgade 67C, 1264 København K	1850	Five-bay silver factory building from 1850 by Bernhard Hertz
Store Kongensgade 68: Danneskiold-Laurvig Mansion		Store Kongensgade 68, 1264 København K	c. 1745	Building from 1745, probably designed by J.A. Soherr and later expanded with an extra floor
Store Kongensgade 72: De Coninck House		Store Kongensgade 72, 1264 København K	1797	Townhouse from 1797, possibly designed by Joseph-Jacques Ramée
Store Kongensgade 77		Store Kongensgade 77, 1264 København K	1832	Building from 1832
Store Kongensgade 77		Store Kongensgade 77B, 1264 København K	1832	Side wing from 1832
Store Kongensgade 78		Store Kongensgade 78, 1264 København K	1769	House originally from before 1732 but completely rebuilt in 1769 with side wing and rear wing
Store Kongensgade 79A		Store Kongensgade 79A, 1264 København K	1883	House from 1832 to 1833
Store Kongensgade 80		Store Kongensgade 80, 1264 København K		House from 1748 which was extended with an extra floor some time between 1748 and 1783
Store Kongensgade 81 A-D		Store Kongensgade 81A, 1264 København K	1851	
Store Kongensgade 81 A-D		Store Kongensgade 81C, 1264 København K		
Store Kongensgade 81 A-D		Store Kongensgade 81D, 1264 København K		
Store Kongensgade 82		Store Kongensgade 82, 1264 København K	1883	House from before 1734 but completely rebuilt in 1795 and with facade decorations from the 1840s, including its side and rear wing
Store Kongensgade 86-88 and Frederiksgade 1		Store Kongensgade 88, 1264 København K	c. 1745	Four-winged residential block from the 1880s by Gerdinand Meldahl, including the cast iron fences
Store Kongensgade 108: Christians Plejehus		Store Kongensgade 108, 1264 København K	1851	Former hospital from 1765 to 1769 by C. C. Pflueg
Store Kongensgade 108: Christians Plejehus		Store Kongensgade 108A, 1264 København K	1850	The northern part of the cross wing
Store Kongensgade 108: Christians Plejehus		Store Kongensgade 108A, 1264 København K	1850	The southern part of the cross wing
Store Kongensgade 108: Christians Plejehus		Store Kongensgade 108A, 1264 København K	1850	Rear wing in the second courtyard
Store Kongensgade 110: Brøndumgård		Store Kongensgade 110, 1264 København K	1883	House with side wing from 1801 to 1804
Store Strandstræde 4		Store Strandstræde 4, 1255 København K		
Store Strandstræde 6		Store Strandstræde 6, 1255 København K	1789	Corner building from 1788 to 1789
Store Strandstræde 7		Store Strandstræde 7, 1255 København K	1789	Corner building from 1788 to 1789
Store Strandstræde 18: Waagepetersen House		Store Strandstræde 18, 1255 København K	1793	Neoclassical townhouse from 1792 to 1793 by Johan Martin Quist
Store Strandstræde 19–21		Store Strandstræde 19, 1255 København K	1752	One half of a mixed-use development from 1907 to 1908 by Aage Langeland-Mathiesen
Store Strandstræde 19–21		Store Strandstræde 19, 1255 København K		One half of a mixed-use development from 1907 to 1908 by Aage Langeland-Mathiesen
Store Strandstræde 20		Store Strandstræde 20, 1255 København K	1789	Corner building from 1788 to 1789
Stormgade 6		Stormgade 6, 1159 København K		
Stormgade 8		Stormgade 7, 1159 København K		
Stormgade 10: Holstein Mansion		Stormgade 10, 1470 København K		Building from 1687 (possibly designed by Lambert van Haven) which was expanded some time between 1711 and 1740 and then heightened and adapted in 1756 by Jacob Fortling. Also a side wing which was originally a free-standing building from 1706 (possibly designed by Johan Conrad Ernst, later connected to the main wing before 1760
Stormgade 10: Holstein Mansion		Stormgade 10, 1470 København K	1850	Half-timbered rear wing from the last half of the 17th century
Stormgade 10: Holstein Mansion		Stormgade 12, 1470 København K	1850	Building from c. 1680 which was strongly altered and heightened towards the street in 1798, heightened towards the courtyard in 1830 and then extended lengthwise in 1850
Stormgade 14: Det Harboeske Enkefruekloster		Stormgade 14E, 1470 København K		Older building which was altered in 1741 by Elias David Häusser, then expanded in 1754–60 to design by Lauritz de Thurahs tegning and again in 1772 by Caspar Friedrich Harsdorff
Stormgade 16: Hotel Danmark		Stormgade 16, 1470 København K	1797	Building from 1790 to 1791 with dormer added in 1811
Stormgade 18: Overformynderiet		Stormgade 18, 1555 København V		Three-winged complex with walls and gate from 1893 to 1894 by Hans Jørgen Holm
Studiestræde 5–9		Studiestræde 5, 1455 København K		No. 5: Building from 1796. No. 7: Building from 1807 to 1808 by Jacob Lynge. No. 9: Building from 1798 to 1799 by Michael Bälckow.
Studiestræde 8: Noahs Ark		Studiestræde 8, 1455 København K	1801	Building, building and building in the courtyard from 1798 by Christian Martens as well as the cobbled courtyard
Studiestræde 10		Larslejsstræde 7, 1451 København K	1801	Building from 1800 to 1801 by Christopher Chrane
Studiestræde 12		Studiestræde 12, 1455 København K	1801	Building from 1798 to 1799 by Jens Dahl
Studiestræde 13–13A		Studiestræde 13, 1455 København K		Building from 1798 by Niels Zimmer
Studiestræde 14		Studiestræde 14, 1455 København K	1801	Building from 1801 to 1802 by J.J. Schlage
Studiestræde 17 and 17B: Krebsegården		Studiestræde 17, 1455 København K	1851	Three-bay building with side wing from 1822
Studiestræde 17 and 17B: Krebsegården		Sankt Annæ Plads 3, 1250 København K	1850	Rear wing from 1822 with 1+ m deep cellar
Studiestræde 21		Studiestræde 21, 1455 København K	1801	Building from 1797 by Christian Martens which was heightened with one storey in 1890
Studiestræde 24		Studiestræde 24, 1455 København K	1801	Building from 1796 to 1798
Studiestræde 25		Studiestræde 25A, 1455 København K	1801	Building from 1796
Studiestræde 35		Studiestræde 35, 1455 København K	1801	Building from 1796
Sværtegade 3		Sværtegade 3, 1118 København K	1851	Building from c. 1730 by Gotfrid Schuster with two floors added in 1791 and Schwartz' shop interior from 1847 by H. C. Stilling
Sværtegade 3		Pilestræde 40C, 1112 København K	1850	Side and rear wing from 1826
Sværtegade 5		Sværtegade 5, 1118 København K	1851	House originally from 1736 but expanded with extra height after 1900
Sværtegade 5		Sværtegade 5, 1118 København K	1850	Side and rear wing
Sværtegade 7: Norwegian Society		Sværtegade 7, 1118 København K	1801	Building with seven-bay, half-timbered side wing from 1738
Sværtegade 9		Sværtegade 9, 1118 København K	1801	Building from 1756 with extra height added in 1847 and the facade altered in 1847

=== T ===
Listing name	Image	Location	Coordinates	Description
Teglgårdsstræde 5-7		Teglgårdstræde 5, 1452 København K		Building from 1799 to 1802 by Christopher Chrane
Teglgårdsstræde 5-7		Teglgårdstræde 7, 1452 København K		Building from 1801
Teglgårdsstræde 12		Teglgårdstræde 12, 1452 København K		Building fronting the street from 1791
Teglgårdsstræde 12		Teglgårdstræde 7, 1452 København K		Side wing from before 1781 and cross wing 1730
Teglgårdsstræde 12		Teglgårdstræde 7, 1452 København K		Rear wing from 1729
Teglgårdsstræde 16		Teglgårdstræde 16, 1452 København K		Building from 1805 by Poul Egeroed
Teglgårdsstræde 16		Teglgårdstræde 16, 1452 København K		Rear wing from 1805 by Poul Egeroed
Toldbodgade 5		Toldbodgade 5, 1253 København K		Warehouse from 1807
Toldbodgade 7		Toldbodgade 7, 1253 København K		
Toldbodgade 7		Toldbodgade 7A, 1253 København K		
Toldbodgade 12: Toldbodgade 12		Toldbodgade 24, 1253 København K		Building from between 1716 and 1733 with extra floor added in 1793and side and rear wing from 1793
Toldbodgade 24: Copenhagen Admiral Hotel		Toldbodgade 24, 1253 København K	1783	Two granaries from 1787 merged into one building in 1885
Toldbodgade 38: The Blue Warehouse		Toldbodgade 36A, 1253 København K	1783	Warehouse from 1781 to 1783 by Caspar Frederik Harsdorff
Toldbodgade 38: Yellow Warehouse		Toldbodgade 38 A, 1253 København K	1783	Warehouse from 1777 to 1783 by Georg Erdman Rosenberg, adapted and restored in 1978–79
Toldbodgade 40: Vestindisk Pakhus		Toldbodgade 40, 1253 København K	1781	Warehouse from 1780 to 1781 by Caspar Frederik Harsdorff and the gate pavilions at the entrance from Toldbodgade from c. 1752 which originally marked the entrance to the Botanical Garden in Amaliegade

=== V ===
Listing name	Image	Location	Coordinates	Description
Valkendorfsgade 3		Valkendorfsgade 3, 1151 København K		
Valkendorfsgade 5		Valkendorfsgade 5, 1151 København K		
Valkendorfsgade 15		Valkendorfsgade 15, 1151 København K		
Valkendorfsgade 17		Valkendorfsgade 17, 1151 København K		
Valkendorfsgade 36		Valkendorfsgade 36, 1151 København K		Townhouse from 1737
Vandkunsten 8 and Kompagnistræde 39		Vandkunsten 8, 1467 København K	1796	Building at mod Vandkunsten originally from c. 1750 but completely altered in 1803–08, former warehouse at Kompagnistræde 39 from 1803 (the two easternmost bays added in 1859) and the two connecting side wings
Vandkunsten 10: Ording House		Vandkunsten 10, 1467 København K		Corner building from 1802 to 1803
Vandkunsten 11		Vandkunsten 11, 1467 København K		Building from before 1735 (heightened and facade rebuilt in brick in c. 1777) with side wing
Vandkunsten 13		Vandkunsten 13, 1467 København K		Building from 1754 and the northern side wing from 1783
Ved Stranden 8		Ved Stranden 8, 1061 København K	1797	Corner building from 1796 to 1797
Ved Stranden 10: Sundorph House		Ved Stranden 10, 1061 København K		Corner building with side wing from 1796 to 1797
Ved Stranden 12		Ved Stranden 8, 1061 København K	1797	Building with side wing from 1796
Ved Stranden 14: Gustmeyer House		Ved Stranden 14, 1061 København K	1752	House and side wing from 1796 by Johan Martin Quist
Ved Stranden 14: Gustmeyer House		Admiralgade 24, 1066 København K		House fronting Admiralgade
Ved Stranden 16		Ved Stranden 16, 1061 København K		Building from 1748 by Philip de Lange (extra height added in 1886) and the two side wings from 1795 and 1796 (extra height added in 1844)
Vester Voldgade 19		Studiestræde 49, 1455 København K	1797	Building from 1796 to 1797 which was heightened in 1845
Vester Voldgade 21		Vester Voldgade 21, 1552 København V	1797	Building with side wing from 1796 to 1797 which was heightened between 1832 and 1844
Vestergade 1		Vestergade 1, 1456 København K	1797	Corner building from 1795
Vestergade 2: Obel House		Vestergade 2, 1456 København K	1797	House from 1796 to 1797
Vestergade 3		Vestergade 3, 1456 København K	1797	Building with side wing and rear wing from 1795 to 1796
Vestergade 5		Vestergade 5, 1456 København K	1797	Building from 1796 to 1797
Vestergade 7		Vestergade 7, 1456 København K		Building from 1797 to 1798 by Andreas Kirkerup.
Vestergade 7		Vestergade 7, 1456 København K		Side wing from 1797 to 1798 by Andreas Kirkerup.
Vestergade 7		Vestergade 7, 1456 København K	1797	Rear wing from 1797 to 1798 by Andreas Kirkerup. Heightened in the 1870s.
Vestergade 12: Tre Hjorter		Vestergade 12, 1456 København K	1797	Former inn/hotel building from 1796 to 1797 by Lauritz Laurberg Thrane with the last two bays on Larsbjørnsstræde dating from an extension in 1875-76
Vestergade 14-16 and Vestergade 16		Larsbjørnsstræde 1, 1454 København K	1752	Corner building from 1796 by L.L. Thrane and C.F. Hollander
Vestergade 14-16 and Vestergade 16		Larsbjørnsstræde 1, 1454 København K		Wall on Larsbjørnstræde and the side and rear wing from 1796 by L.L. Thrane and C.F. Hollander
Vestergade 14-16 and Vestergade 16		Vestergade 16, 1456 København K		Building fronting Vestergade
Vestergade 15		Vestergade 15, 1456 København K	1797	Corner building from 1797 to 1798 by Philip Lange and L.L. Thrane
Vestergade 20		Vestergade 20A, 1456 København K	1797	Building from 1797 by A.C. Wilcken
Vestergade 21		Vestergade 21, 1456 København K	1797	Building with side wing and rear wing from 1795 to 1796
Vestergade 22		Vestergade 22, 1456 København K	1797	Building from 1798 to 1799
Vestergade 24		Vestergade 24, 1456 København K	1797	Building from 1686
Vestergade 26		Vestergade 26, 1456 København K	1797	Corner building from 1795
Vestergade 27		Vestergade 27, 1456 København K	1797	Building with two side wings and rear wing from 1797 to 1799 by J.W. Steenberg
Vestergade 29-31		Vestergade 29, 1456 København K	1797	Two buildings; the eastern one dates from 1798 to 1799 and the western one dates from 1796 to 1797
Vestergade 33		Vestergade 33, 1456 København K	1797	Building from 1795 to 1796
Vingårdstræde 15		Vingårdstræde 15, 1070 København K	1797	Corner building from 1797 to 1798 by Philip Lange and L.L. Thrane
Vingårdstræde 19		Vingårdstræde 19, 1070 København K	1797	Building from 1796 to 1797 by Niels Hansen and H.C. Schmidt
Vingårdstræde 20		Vingårdstræde 20, 1070 København K	1797	Building from 1851 by P.C. Hagemann
Vingårdstræde 21		Vingårdstræde 21, 1070 København K	1797	Corner building from side wing from 1797

=== Christianshavn ===
- Listed buildings in Christianshavn

=== Slotsholmen ===
Listing name	Image	Location	Coordinates	Description
Christian IV's Arsenal		Tøjhusgade 3, 1214 København K	1720	Former arsenal built in 1598–1611 by Christian IV and Berendt Petersen
Christian IV's Brewhouse		Frederiksholms Kanal 29, 1220 København K	1618	Former brewhouse built in 1616–18 and rebuilt after fires in 1632 and 1767
Proviantgården		Rigsdagsgården 7A, 1218 København K		Guardhouse at Generalstabsporten
Proviantgården		Proviantgården 1, 1218 København K		Former storage building
Royal Library Garden		Rigsdagsgården 11A, 1218 København K	c. 1700	Artillerigeneralens kontor: Building from c. 1700
Royal Library Garden		Rigsdagsgården 11B, 1218 København K		
Royal Library Garden		Rigsdagsgården 13B, 1218 København K		
Slotsholmsgade 4: Kancellibygningen		Slotsholmsgade 4, 1216 København K	1720	Three-winged complex from 1715 to 1720 by Johan Conrad Ernst fronting Slotsholmsgade and with side wings to the northwest (Slotspladsen) and southeast
Slotsholmsgade 6		Slotsholmsgade 8, 1216 København K	1783	Building from 1783 by Caspar Frederik Harsdorff
Slotsholmsgade 8: Storm House		Slotsholmsgade 8, 1216 København K	1696	House from 1696
Slotsholmsgade 8: Storm House		Slotsholmsgade 8, 1216 København K		Western side wing
Slotsholmsgade 10: Lerche House		Slotsholmsgade 10, 1216 København K	1742	House from 1741 to 1742 by J. A. Soherr, later expanded with an extra floor
Staldmestergården		Frederiksholms Kanal 21, 1220 København K		Corner building from 1703 to 1706 by Wilhelm Friedrich von Platen and Christof Marselis
Staldmestergården		Tøjhusgade 9, 1214 København K		One-storey building in the courtyard
Staldmestergården		Tøjhusgade 9, 1214 København K		Havremagasinet from 1820 to 1840

== Bispebjerg ==
Listing name	Image	Location	Year built	Contributing resource	Ref
Atelierhusene: Grønnemose Allé 21 A-G (7)		Grønnemose Allé21 A-G, 2400 København NV	1942	Artists' housing designed by Viggo Møller-Jensen	
Atelierhusene: Grønnemose Allé 23-35 (7)		Grønnemose Allé 23–35, 2400 København NV	1942	Artists' housing designed by Viggo Møller-Jensen	
Atelierhusene: Grønnemose Allé 37-49 (7)		Grønnemose Allé 37–49, 2400 København NV	1942	Artists' housing designed by Viggo Møller-Jensen	
Bakkehusene: Bakkevej (20)		Bakkevej 01-51 and 02–52, 2400 København NV	1022	Row houses from 1921 to 1922 designed by Thorkild Henningsen and Ivar Bentsen	
Bakkehusene: Hulgårdsvej (20)		Hulgårdsvej 19–73, 2400 København NV	1022	Row houses from 1921 to 1922 designed by Thorkild Henningsen and Ivar Bentsen	
Bakkehusene: Markvej (20)		Markvej 01-51 and 002–054, 2400 København NV	1022	Row houses from 1921 to 1922 designed by Thorkild Henningsen and Ivar Bentsen	
Bakkehusene: Rødkildevej (20)		Rødkildevej 002–076, 2400 København NV	1022	Row houses from 1921 to 1922 designed by Thorkild Henningsen and Ivar Bentsen	
Bispebjerg Hospital (19)		Bispebjerg Bakke 21–23,2400 København NV	1913	Hospital from 1908 to 1913 designed by the architect Martin Nyrop and the landscape architect Edvard Glæsel	
Lygten Station		Lygten 2A, 2400 København NV	1906	Former railway station from 1906 designed by Heinrich Wenck	
Nielsen & Jespersens		Rentemestervej 14, 2400 København NV	1934	Former plastic goods factory complex consisting of a two-storey building from 1934, a one-storey extension from 1842 and a factory hall from 1944	

== Brønshøj ==
Listing name	Image	Location	Year built	Contributing resource	Ref
Bellahøj		Bellahøjvej 20, 2700 Brønshøj	c. 1800	House from c. 1800	
Brønshøj Water Tower		Brønshøjvej 29, 2700 Brønshøj	1928	Water tower from 1928 designed by Ib Lunding	
Husum School (3)		Karlslundevej 23, 2700 Brønshøj	c. 1800	Three-winged school building from 1930 designed by Edvard Thomsen and Frits Schlegel	

== Nørrebro ==
- Listed buildings in Nørrebro

== Vesterbro/Kongens Enghave ==
- Listed buildings in Vesterbro/Kongens Enghave

== Østerbro ==
- Listed buildings in Østerbro

== Delisted buildings in Copenhagen ==
Listing name	Image	Location	Year built	Contributing resource	Ref
Åhusene (2)		Åboulevard 12 and 16, 2200 København N	1894	Two apartment buildings from 1894 designed by Ulrik Plesnr	
Brolæggerstræde 14		Brolæggerstræde 14, 1211 København K	1797		
Gammeltorv 16		Gammeltorv 16, 1457 København K	1937	Building with side wing from 1800 to 1801	
Gothersgade 33-33 A and Store Regnegade 19 A-B		Gothersgade 33A, 1123 København K	55°40′55.59″N 12°34′56.84″E	Complex of buildings from the 18th century which was later adapted	
Gothersgade 33-33 A and Store Regnegade 19 A-B		Store Regnegade 19B, 1110 København K	55°40′55.43″N 12°34′55.87″E	Warehouse in the courtyard	
Kompagnistræde 22		Kompagnistræde 22, 1208 København K	1796		
Kompagnistræde 43 and Gåsegade 1		Kompagnistræde 2, 1208 København K		Corner building from 1805 to 1806 with facade from 1897	
Hauser Plads 10		Hauser Plads 10, 1127 København K	55°40′56.45″N 12°34′32.02″E	Building from 1822 to 1848	
Nørre Voldgade 48		Nørre Voldgade 48, 1358 København K		Building from 1831 to 1832	
Kongens Nytorv 18: Lihme House		Kongens Nytorv 18, 1050 København K	1768	Townhouse from 1768 by Hans Næss	
Vestergade 18		Vestergade 18, 1456 København K	1797	Building from 1796	

== See also ==
- List of churches in Copenhagen
