= Lille Strandstræde 3 =

Neoclassical property in the Nyhavn Quarter of Copenhagen, Denmark

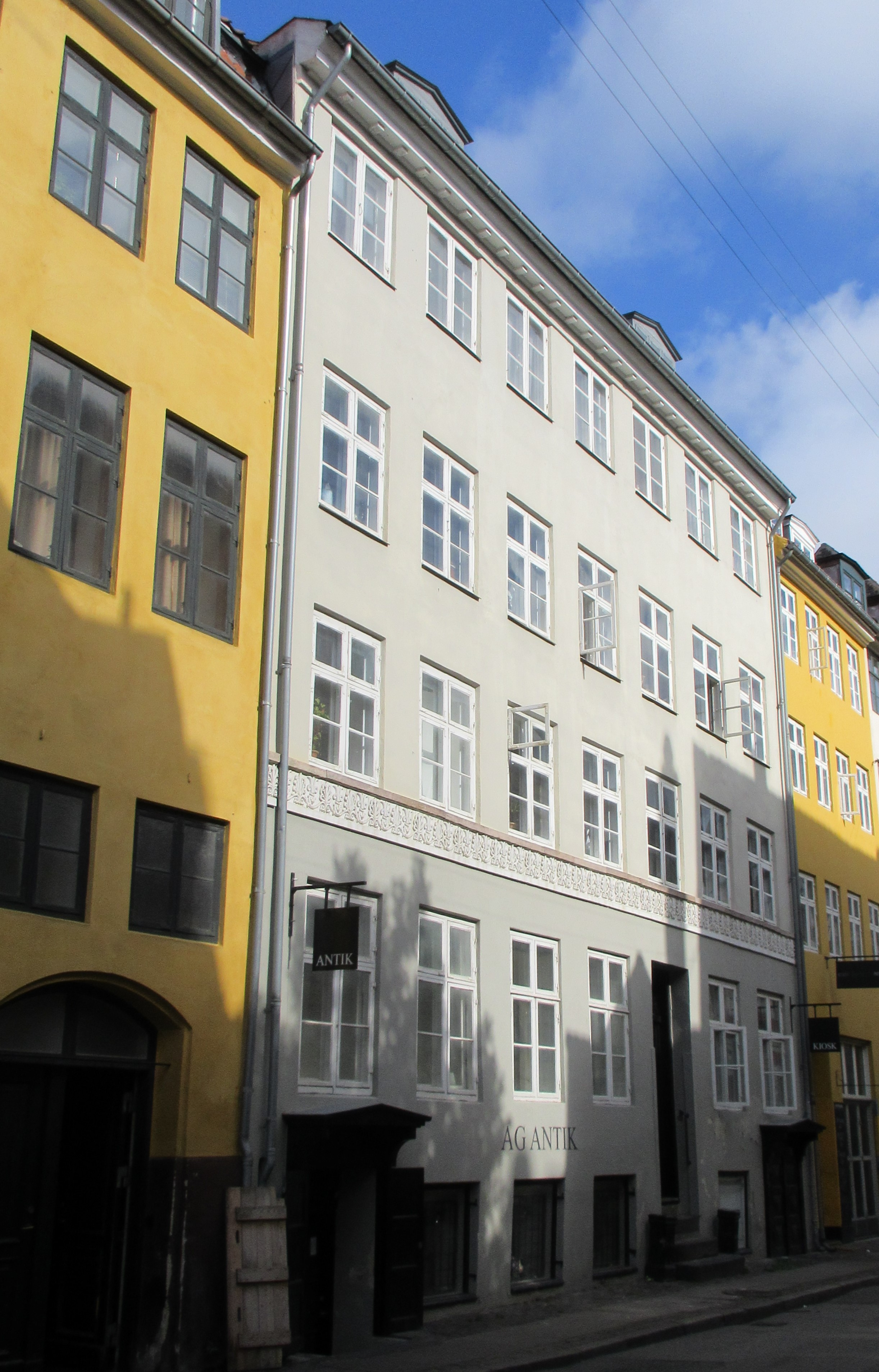
- Interactive map of the Lille Strandstræde 3 area

General information
- Architectural style: Neoclassical
- Location: Copenhagen, Denmark
- Coordinates: 55°40′50.27″N 12°35′21.48″E
- Completed: 1785
- Renovated: 1832

Lille Strandstræde 3 is a Neoclassical property in the Nyhavn Quarter of central Copenhagen, Denmark. The building was listed in the Danish registry of protected buildings and places in 1979.

== History ==
=== 18th century ===
The property was listed as No. 30 in St. Ann's East Quarter (Sankt Annæ Øster Kvarter) in Copenhagen's first cadastre of 1689. It was at that time owned by beer seller (øltapper), Peder Christensen. It was listed as No. 106 in the new cadastre of 1756, and was then owned by brewery worker (bryggersvend), Niels Christensen.

The present building on the site was constructed in 1785 for distiller Iver Andersen Buck.

Buch's property was home to 22 residents in six households at the time of the 1787 census. Iver Buch resided in the building with his wife Johanna Margrethe, their two-year-old son Christian Anders, one maid, one male servant and one lodger. Niels P. Lund, an innkeeper, resided in the building with his wife Maren Christians Datter, their one-year-old daughter and one maid. Hans Jørgen Sonne, a skipper, resided in the building with his wife Kierstine and their two children (aged two and five). Ancher Madsen, a miller, resided in the building with his wife Else Marie. Søren Hansen Rabe, another skipper, resided in the building with his wife Dorthe Jens Datter and one maid. Kerstine Fenne, a 42-year-old widow, resided in the building with her four-year-old son and one maid.

=== 19th century ===
The new building was home to 39 residents in six households at the 1801 census. Lars Christensen Olding, a brewer and distiller, resided in the building with his wife Else Rasmusdatter, their two-year-old son, a caretaker, a maid and three lodgers (a skipper and two sailors). Niels Lund, a grocer (spækhøker), resided in the building with his wife Maren Lund and their four children (aged seven to 14). A third household was made up of five sailors (aged 24 to 44) and one maid (associated with Lund's household). Jesper Rosenberg, a shoemaker, resided in the building with his wife Ane Krag, their 17-year-old daughter, three shoemakers and two shoemaker's apprentices. Tulesen Møller, a lawyer (procurator), resided in the building with his wife Helene Sophie Møller and their two children (aged four and seven). Hans Møller, a skipper, resided in the building with his wife Elisabeth Møller, their one-year-old son, two relatives (aged 50 and 12) and two maids.

IThe property was listed in the new cadastre of 1806 as No. 73 in St. Ann's East Quarter. It was still owned by Lars Christensen Olling at that time. He was at this point no longer registered as a brewer and distiller but instead as a grocer (høker).

=== 1834 census ===
The property was home to 27 residents in five households at the 1834 census. Johanne Charlotte Louise Studsgaard, wife of a customs officer in Helsingør, resided on the ground floor with her four children (aged two to 13), three lodgers and one maid. Andreas Hermansen Holm, an office clerk, resided in the building with his wife Anna Maria Holm, one maid and one lodger. Magretha Clausen, a 36-year-old widow, resided on the second floor with her four children (aged two to 10), another 14-year-old girl in her care and one maid. Carl Gottlob Stelzner, a portrait painter, resided on the second floor with his daughter Caroline Amalie Stettzner. Christian Larsen Smith, an instrument maker, resided on the second floor with his wife Kristiane Dorthe Schmidt, their two children (aged one and three) and one lodger.

=== 1880 census ===
Charlotte Stererrius, a widow with a pension, resided in one of the first-floor apartments. Karen Clausen, another widow, resided in the other first-floor apartment with her 32-year-old daughter and 35-year-old son. Christine Reesen, a third widow, resided in one of the second-floor apartments with one maid. Rasmus Andersen, a master cooper, resided in the other second-floor apartment with his wife Olinne Andersen and their three children (aged 13 to 22). Ludvig Thygesen, a clerk (contorist), resided in one of the third-floor apartments with his wife Johanne Thygesen and their 21-year-old daughter. Peter Petersen, a clockmaker, resided in the other third-floor apartment with his wife Else Petersen and their one-year-old daughter. Caroline Dam, a magazine deliverer, resided in the garret. Jens Olsen, a courier, resided in the basement with his wife Ane Marie Olsen and their three children (aged 14 to 19). Georg Bryggebeerk, a barkeeper, resided on the ground floor of the rear wing with his wife Hanne Bryggebeerk and one maid. Gerhart Hildebrand, a lithographer, was also residing on the ground floor of the rear wing.

== Architecture ==
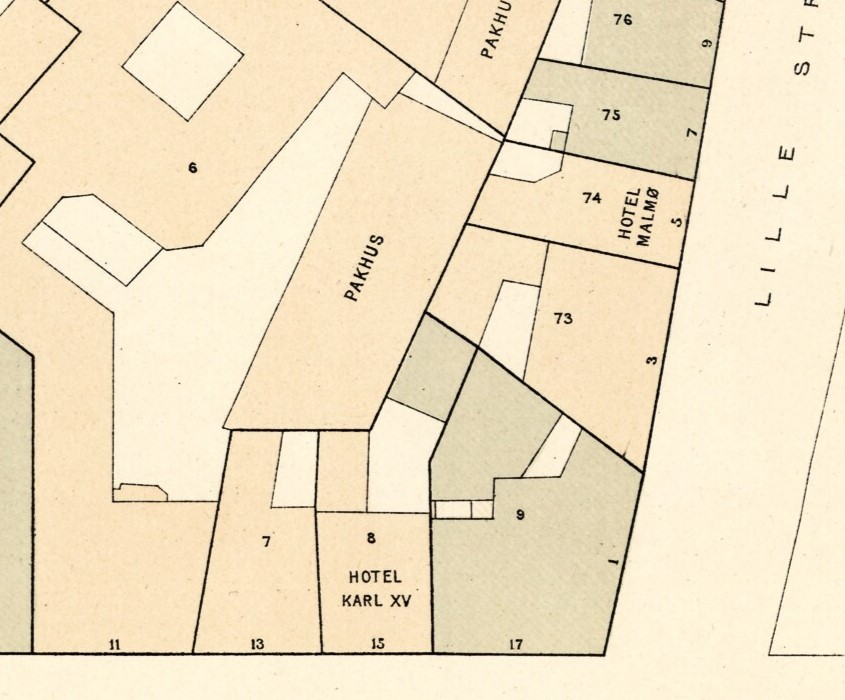
Lille Strandstræde 3 seen in a detail from one of Berggreen's block plans of St. Ann's East Quarter

The building is constructed with four storeys over a walk-out basement and is seven bays wide. The fourth storey was added in 1832. The acanthus frieze below the windows on the first floor was also added at this point.

A three-storey narrow perpendicular side wing extends from the rear side of the building. The side wing and the rear side of the main wing are both rendered in a red colour.

== Today ==
The building is today owned by lawyer Wilhelm Mule Malling.
