= Nyhavn 37 =

Listed building in Copenhagen

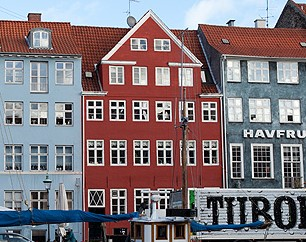
- Interactive map of the Nyhavn 37 area

General information
- Location: Copenhagen, Denmark
- Coordinates: 55°40′48.5″N 12°35′26.02″E
- Completed: 18th century

Nyhavn 37 is an 18th-century property overlooking the Nyhavn Canal in central Copenhagen, Denmark. The building was listed in the Danish registry of protected buildings and places in 1923.

== Architecture ==
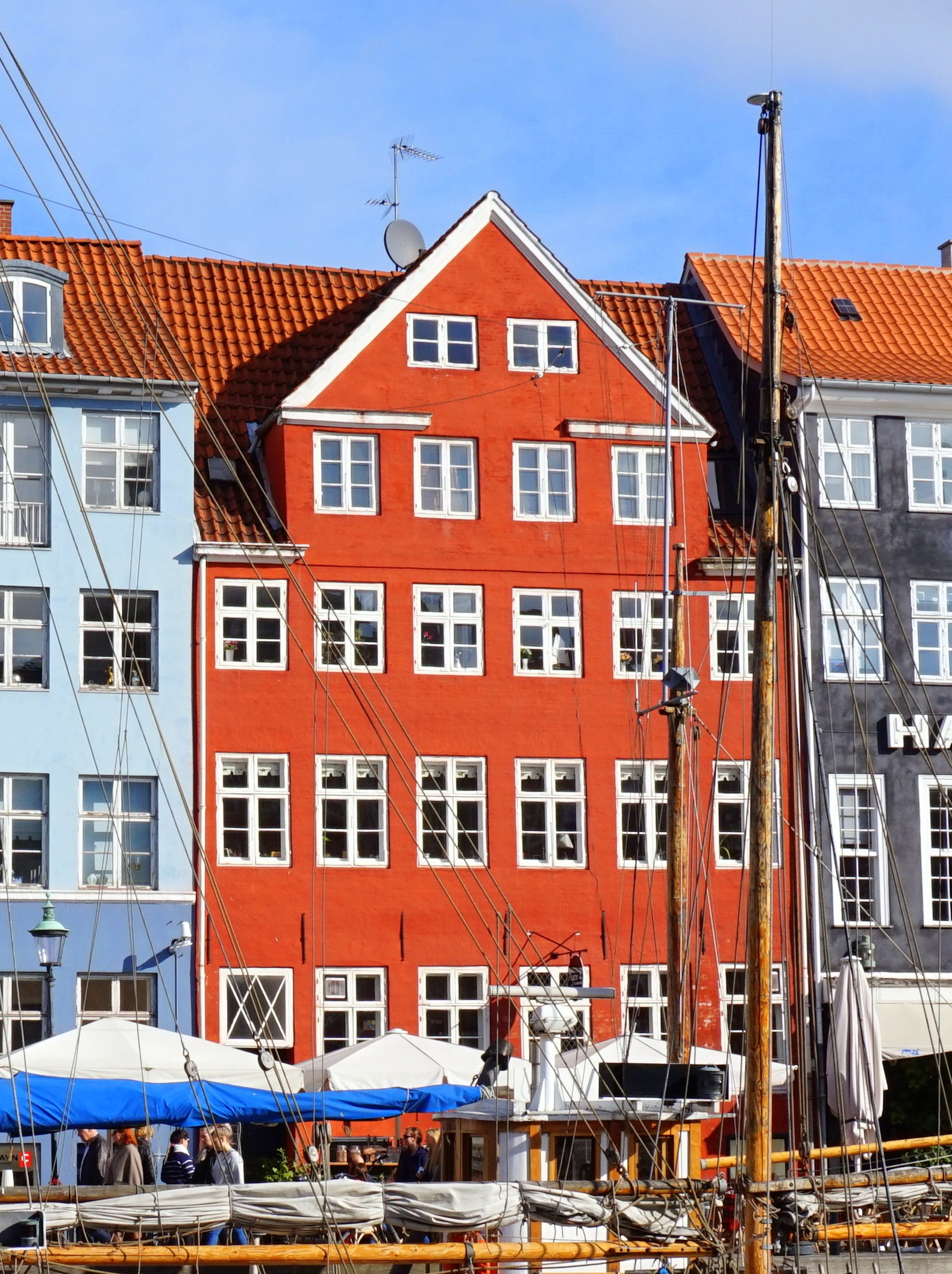
Nyhavn 37 viewed from the other side of the canal

The facade is plastered and red painted with white painted windows. It is crowned by a four-bay gabled wall dormer with cornice returns. The main entrance in the bay furthest to the left is topped by a transom window with coloured glass. A two-storey side wing extends from the rear side of the building. The walls on this side of the building are finished with black-painted timber framing and plastered, white-painted infills.
