= Lille Strandstræde 18 =

Neoclassical property in central Copenhagen, Denmark

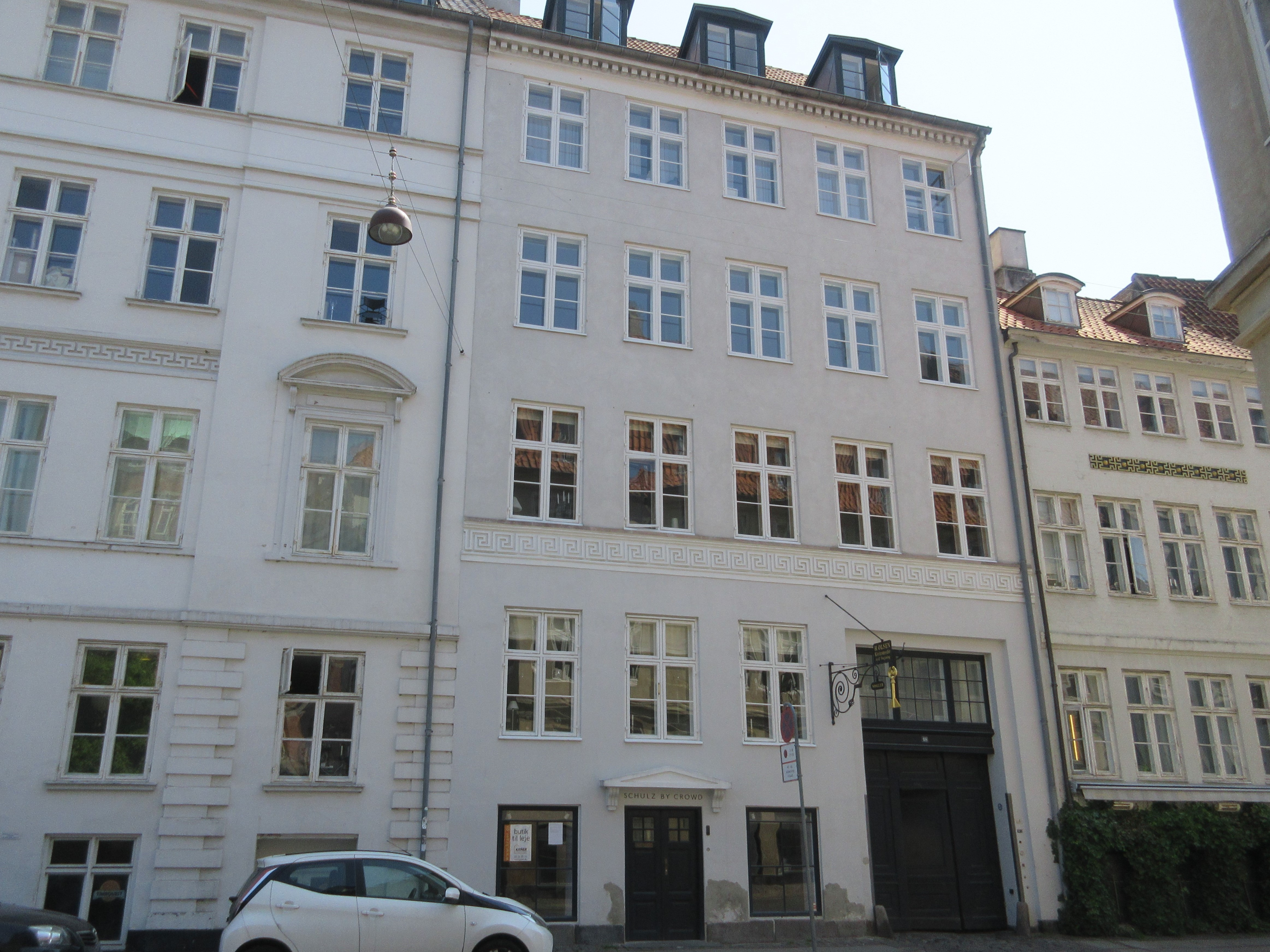
- Interactive map of the Lille Strandstræde 18 area

General information
- Architectural style: Neoclassical
- Location: Copenhagen, Denmark
- Coordinates: 55°40′51.96″N 12°35′24.43″E
- Completed: 1834

Lille Strandstræde 18 is a Neoclassical property situated off Sankt Annæ Plads in central Copenhagen, Denmark. It was listed in the Danish registry of protected buildings and places in 1950.

== History ==
=== 18th century ===
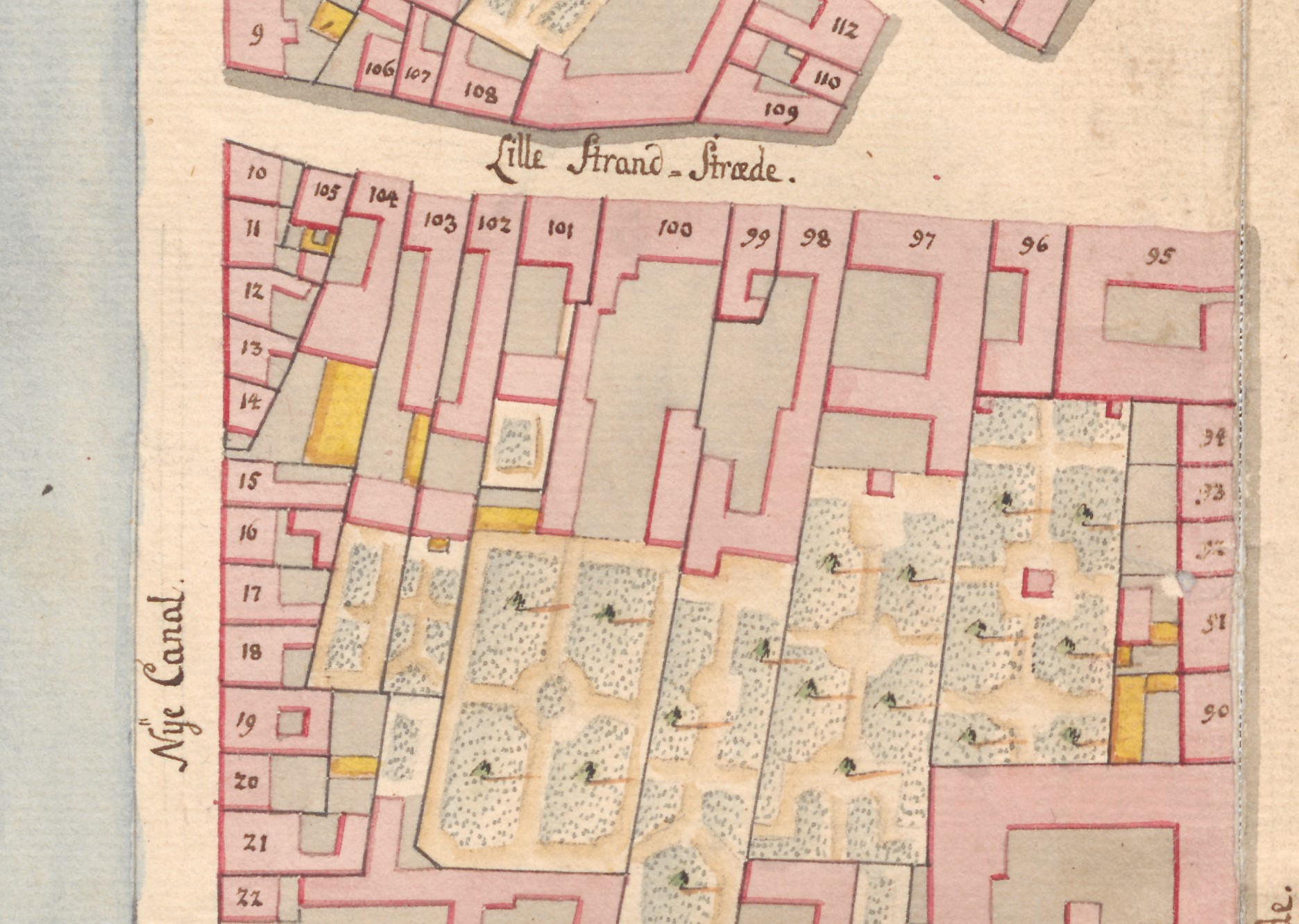
No. 98 seen in a detail from Christian Gedde's map of St. Ann's East Quarter, 1757

The site was formerly part of a much larger property, listed in Copenhagen's first cadastre of 1689 as NNo. 26 in St. Ann's East Quarter. It was owned by Jens Broch at that time. This property was divided into a number of smaller properties in around 1730. In 1731, it belonged to Hans Friederich Lange. He operated a brewery on the site.

The property now known as Lille Strandstræde 18 was listed in the new cadastre of 1756 as No. 98 and belonged to brewer Iver Christian Qvist at that time.

=== Peter Andreas Valentin ===
The property was home to 16 residents in two households at the time of the 1787 census. Peter Andreas Valentin, a brewer and grocer (hørkræmmer), resided in the building with his wife Anna Rebekka Bringe, their two children (aged two and five), three employees and one maid. Hans Jacob Hiorth, a judge in Hof- og Stadsretten, resided in the building with his wife Helena, two daughters (aged 10 and 22), one male servant, one female cook and one maid.

Vanentin's property was home to a total of 30 residents at the 1801 census. Valentin now with title of Regiment Quarter Master, resided in the building with his wife, their now four children (aged three to 19), a brewer, a brewer's assistant, a caretaker and a maid. Adam Christopher Knuth, a chamberlain, resided in the building with his wife Sophie Magdalene Knuth, their six children (aged four to 17), a male instructor, a female French teacher (Francoise), two chamber maids (kammerjomfru and jomfru), a housekeeper, a male servant and a maid.

The property was listed in the new cadastre of 1806 as No. 66 in St. Ann's East Quarter. It was still owned by Peter AndreasValentin at that time.

=== Heyman and the new building ===
The present building on the site was constructed in 1833-34 for merchant Wulff Philip Heyman (1794–1866) and Sophie Abrahamson. The large property No. 66 was in 1852 divided into the two separate properties No. 55 A (now Lille Strandstræde 18) and No. 66 B (now Nyhavn 31).

The two side wings and the rear wing were fully occupied when the 1834 census took place. These three buildings were home to a total of 95 residents in 22 households at the 1834 census. Niels Hansen, a master turner, resided on the ground floor of the side wing with his wife Eline Kirstine Lundsteen, their four children (aged two to 11), an apprentice and a maid. Charlothe Nielsen, a widow laundry woman, resided on the ground floor of the side wing with her two children (aged two and three) and a 33-year-old unmarried woman (needlework) with a one-year-old son. Martin Halberg, a master painter, resided on the first floor of the side wing with his wife Christiane Broslius and their three children (aged six to 13). Thor Hoff, a master tailor, resided on the first floor of the side wing with his wife Sahra Wandstrøm and their two children (aged 11 and 13). Julius Nielsen, a cooper, resided on the second floor of the side wing with his wife Walborg Christensen. Lars Lynge, another cooper (widower), resided on the second floor of the side wing with his three children (aged four to 14).

The large complex of buildings was home to a total of 126 residents at the time of the 1840 census. The number of residents had by 1845 declined to 96.

In 1852 a section of the property was transferred to No. 68 B (Nyhavn 31, then No. 66 B & 68 B).

=== Later history ===
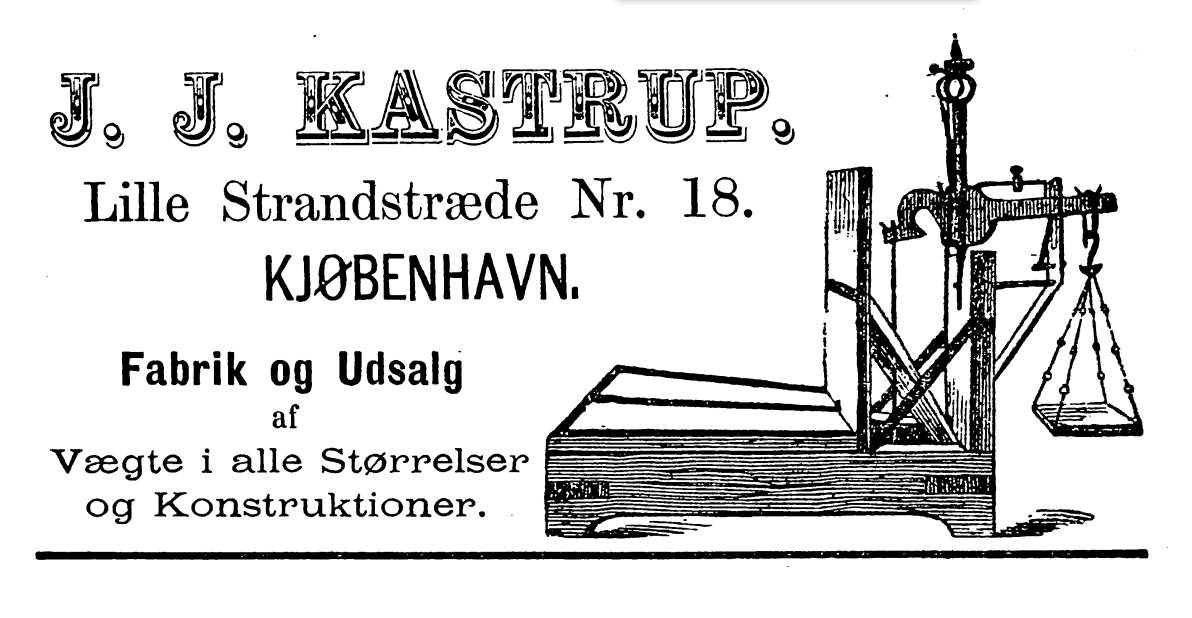
Advert for J. H. Larsen, 1872

J. J. Kastrup, a manufacturer of weights, was based in the building the early 1870s. The writer Arthur Abrahams (1836-1905) resided on the first floor from 1891 until his death.

== Architecture ==
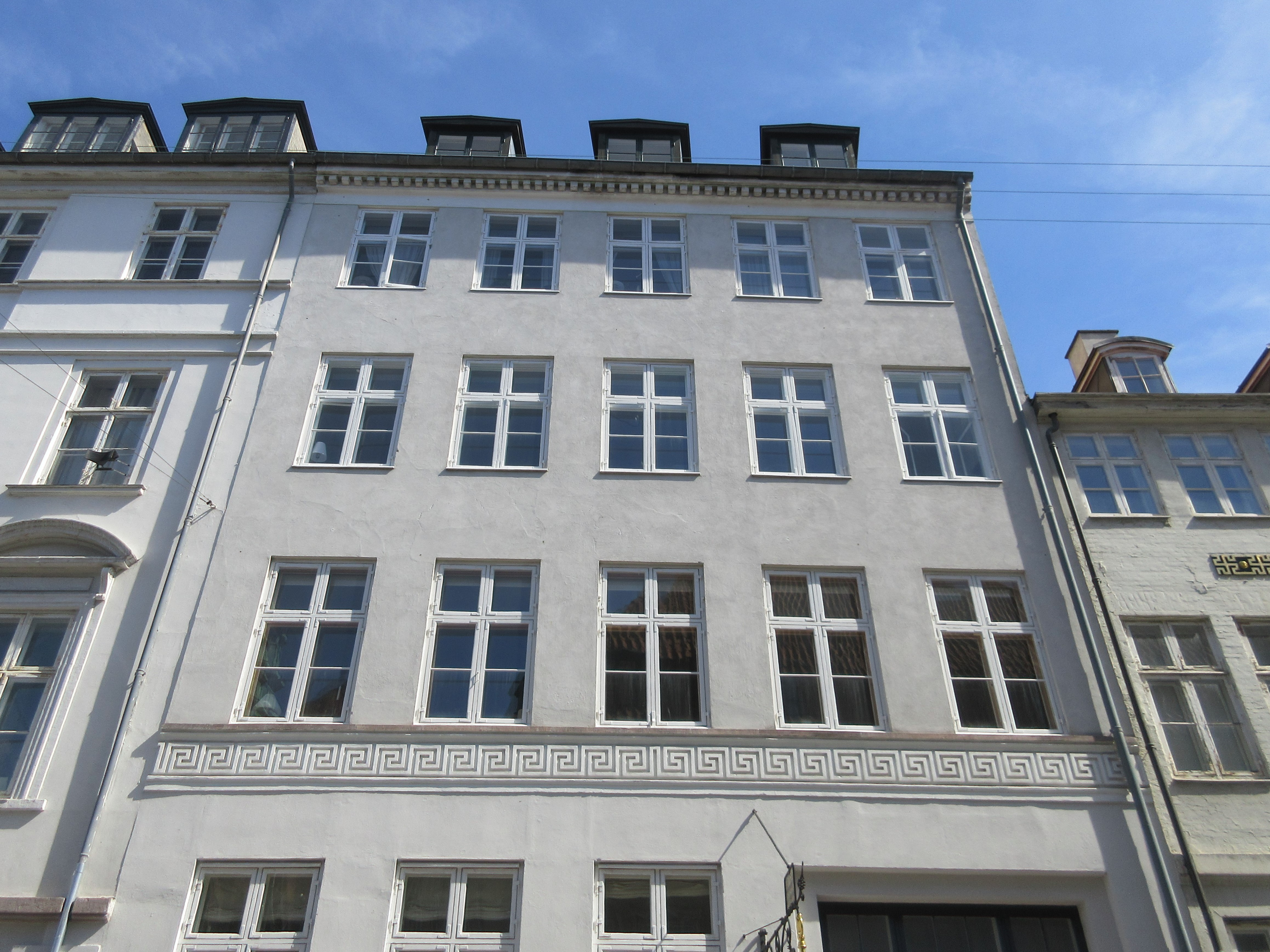
Lille Strandstræde 18

The building is constructed with four storeys over a walk-out basement. The front wing is five bays wide and rendered in a pale grey colour. The facade is finished by a meander frieze under the windows on the first floor and a dentillated cornice under the roof. The gateway furthest to the right (south) is topped by a transom window and next to it is an old cast iron sign from a klein smith. In the third bay is a cellar entrance topped by a Neoclassical hood mould supported by corbels.

A six-bay perpendicular side wing extends from the rear side of the building. It is again attached to a number of other secondary buildings, surrounding a narrow, cobbled courtyard. All the facades are plastered in an iron vitriol yellow colour. The building (including the six-bay side wing) was listed in the Danish registry of protected buildings and places in 1950. The other buildings in the courtyard are not part of the heritage listing.

== Today ==
The property is today owned by the cooperative housing association (andelsboligforening) A/B Lllle Strandstræde 18.
