= Nyhavn 45 =

Listed building in Copenhagen

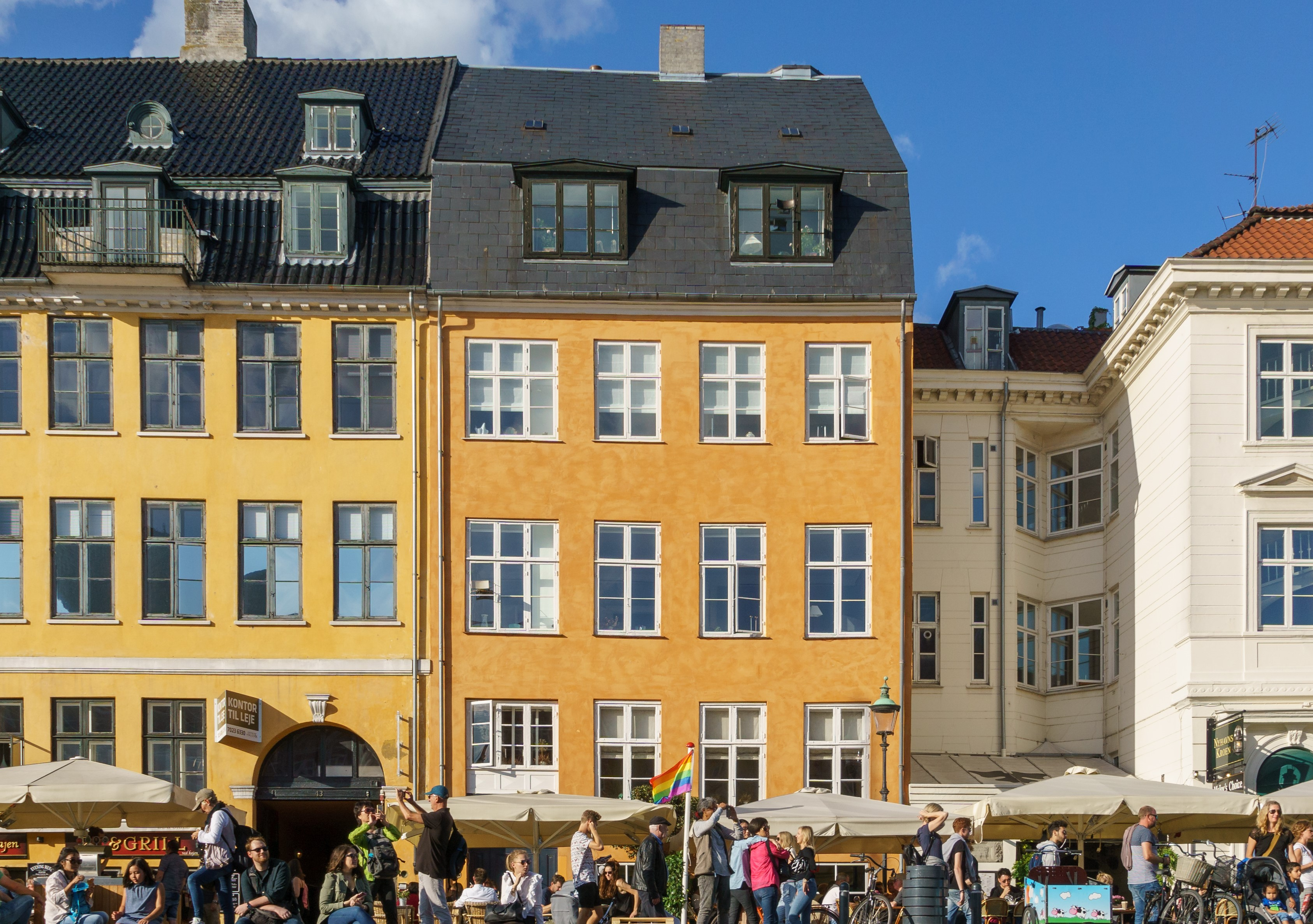
- Interactive map of the Nyhavn 45 area

General information
- Location: Copenhagen, Denmark
- Coordinates: 55°40′48″N 12°35′27.92″E
- Completed: 1740
- Renovated: 1797, 1850-51

Nyhavn 45 is an 18th-century property overlooking the Nyhavn Canal in central Copenhagen, Denmark. It was listed in the Danish registry of protected buildings and places in 1945.

== History ==
=== 18th century ===
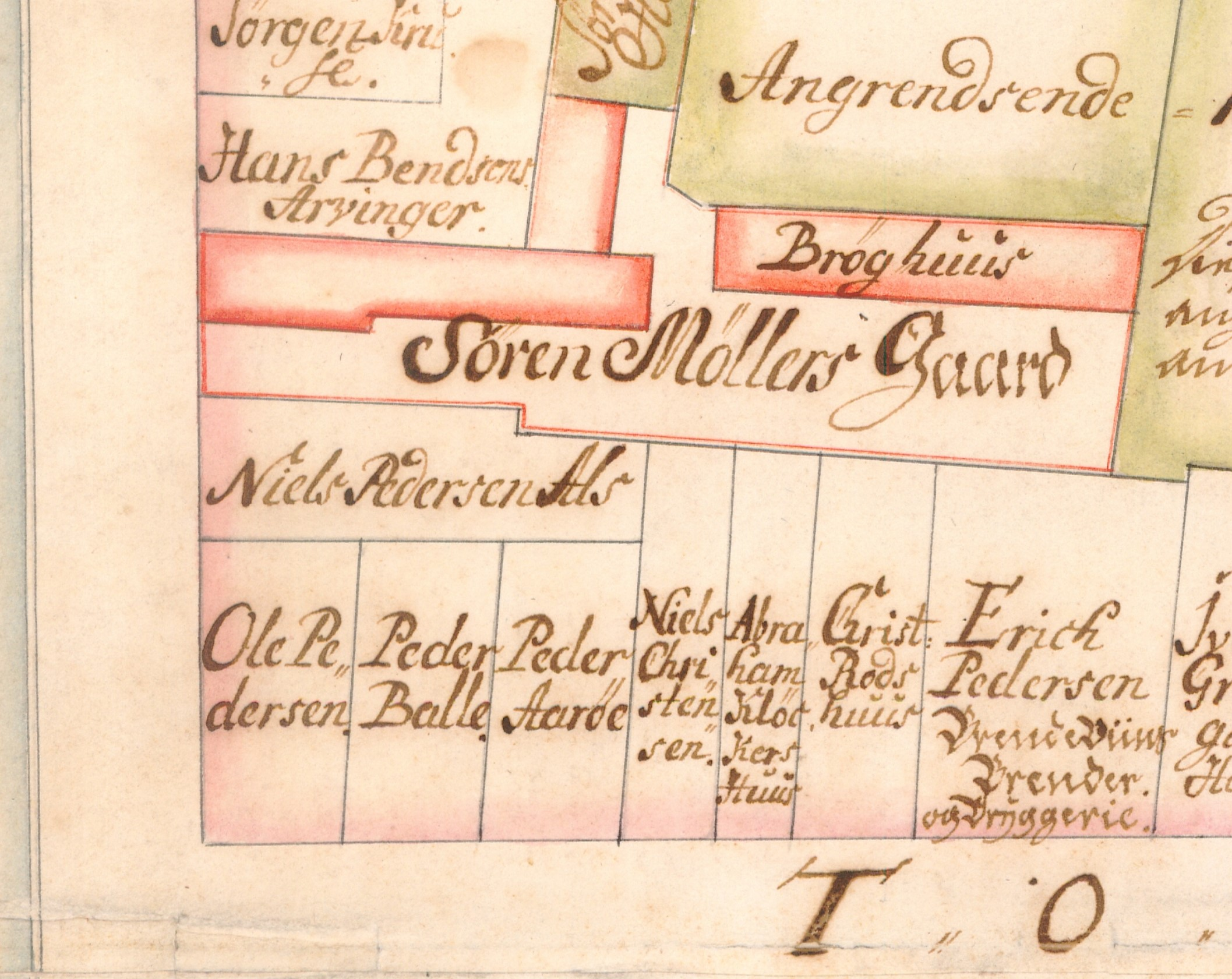
The property seen on a plan from 1731

The site was formerly part of a much larger property, listed in Copenhagen's first cadastre of 1689 as No. 28 in St. Ann's East Quarter and owned by tanner Villum Lydersen at that time. It was later divided into four smaller properties (now Nyhavn 41–47). The present building on the site was constructed with two storeys over a walk-out basement for ropemaker Nikolaj Johansen Juller in 1740. The property was listed in the new cadastre of 1756 as No. 23 and was then still owned by Juller.

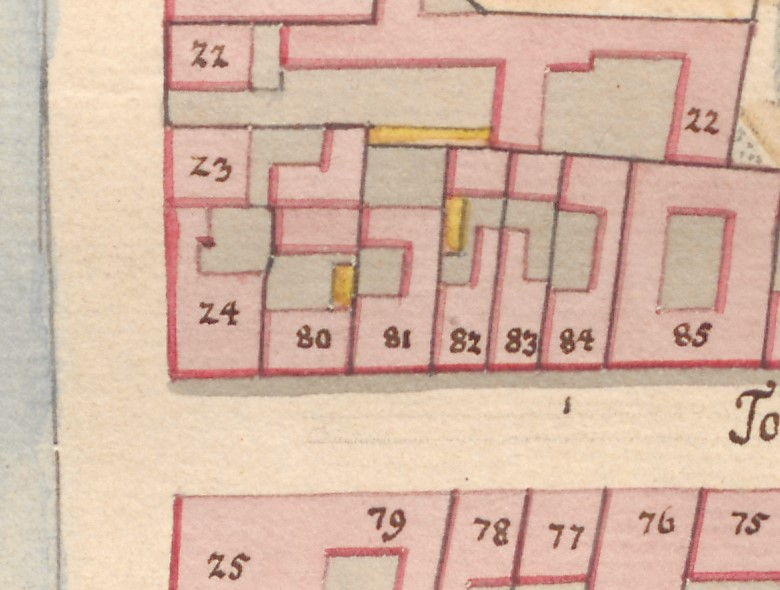
No. 323 seen in a detail from Christian Gedde's map of St. Ann's East Quarter, 1757

The property was shortly thereafter acquired by sailmaker Ole Pedersen Sangaard (died 1759). He was originally from Bornholm. He served as alderman of the Sailmakers' Guild in Copenhagen. His brother Andreas Pedersen Sangaard was a sailmaker at No. 5 (now Nyhavn 9). Ole Pedersen Sangaard was married to Anne Kirstine Hansdatter Kleitrup (1721-1788), a daughter of sailmaker Hans Kleitrup at No. 21 (now Nyhavn 41). They had nine children.

The property was home to 25 residents in five households in 1787. Anthony Hans Lynning, a master buttonmaker, resided in the building with his wife Dorothea Mariager, their three children (aged seven to 11), two apprentices and two maids. Jacob Buntzen (1736-1820), a clerk (fuldmægtig) in Diderich de Thurah's office, resided in the building with his wife Elisabeth Rohde (1753-1808), four children from his first marriage (mother: Cathrine Sangaard, aged nine to 10) and one maid. Søren Myhre, a Fauesætter, resided in the building with his wife Mette Cathrine Niels Datter. Jochum Andresen Kiøng, a courier at the Skippers' Guild House, resided in the building with his wife Anne Lars Datter, his nephew Andreas Andersen and two lodgers. Inger Kemps, an 80-year-old widow, was the last resident of the building.

In 1790, Jacob Buntzen moved to an apartment at Norgesgade No. 159. He would later acquire the title of overkrigskommissær.

The building was heightened with one storey in 1794. A warehouse had been constructed in the courtyard on the rear in 1791.

=== Holm family ===
The property was at some point acquired by sailmaker Peter Holm (1764-1812). He was the brother of the wealthy merchant Jacob Holm. Peter Holm's property was home to 24 residents in three households at the time of the 1801 census. Peter Holm resided in the building with his wife Madsine Sophie Lystrup (1777-1852), their three-year-old son Rasmus Andreas Holm (1799-1863), one maid and six sailmaker's apprentices. Hans Bang Aresch, a businessman (mægler), resided in the building with his wife Magdalene Nissen, their 17-year-old daughter Maren Ravn Nissen, one maid and the office clerk Johannes Møhl. Cathrine Marie Kiellerup (née Bush), a widow, resided in another apartment with her sons Niels Christian and Daniel Kiellerup (both office clerks), two maids, sailmaker Peter Black, Black's mother Martha Cathrine Forster, another maid and the lodger Peter Løvgreen.

The property was again listed as No. 23 in the new cadastre of 1806. It was at that time still owned by Peter Holm. Peter Holm's mother lived with him after she had become a widow. She died in the building on 6 July 1811.

Peter Holm's son Rasmus Andreas Holm was married to Christiane Mammen (1805-1877), a foster daughter of his uncle Jacob Holm. The adjacent property at No. 24 (now Nyhavn 47) was later owned by them.

=== Christiansen family ===
The businessmen (grosserer) Wilhelm Friedrich Elter and Christian Christiansen (1803-1877) resided together on the building's three upper floors at the time of the 1834 census. Elter was unmarried. Christiansen resided in the building with his wife Frederike Charlotte (née Konopka, 1811–1864), their three children (aged one to four), and the wife's sister Dorothea Amalia Konopka. The rest of the household consisted of the office clerk Johann Christiansen, the apprentice Georg Johann Ernst von Kienitz, one male servant and two maids. Johanne Kirstine Møller (née Holm), a barkeeper, resided in the basement with her son Hans Peter Møller and two lodgers (sailors).

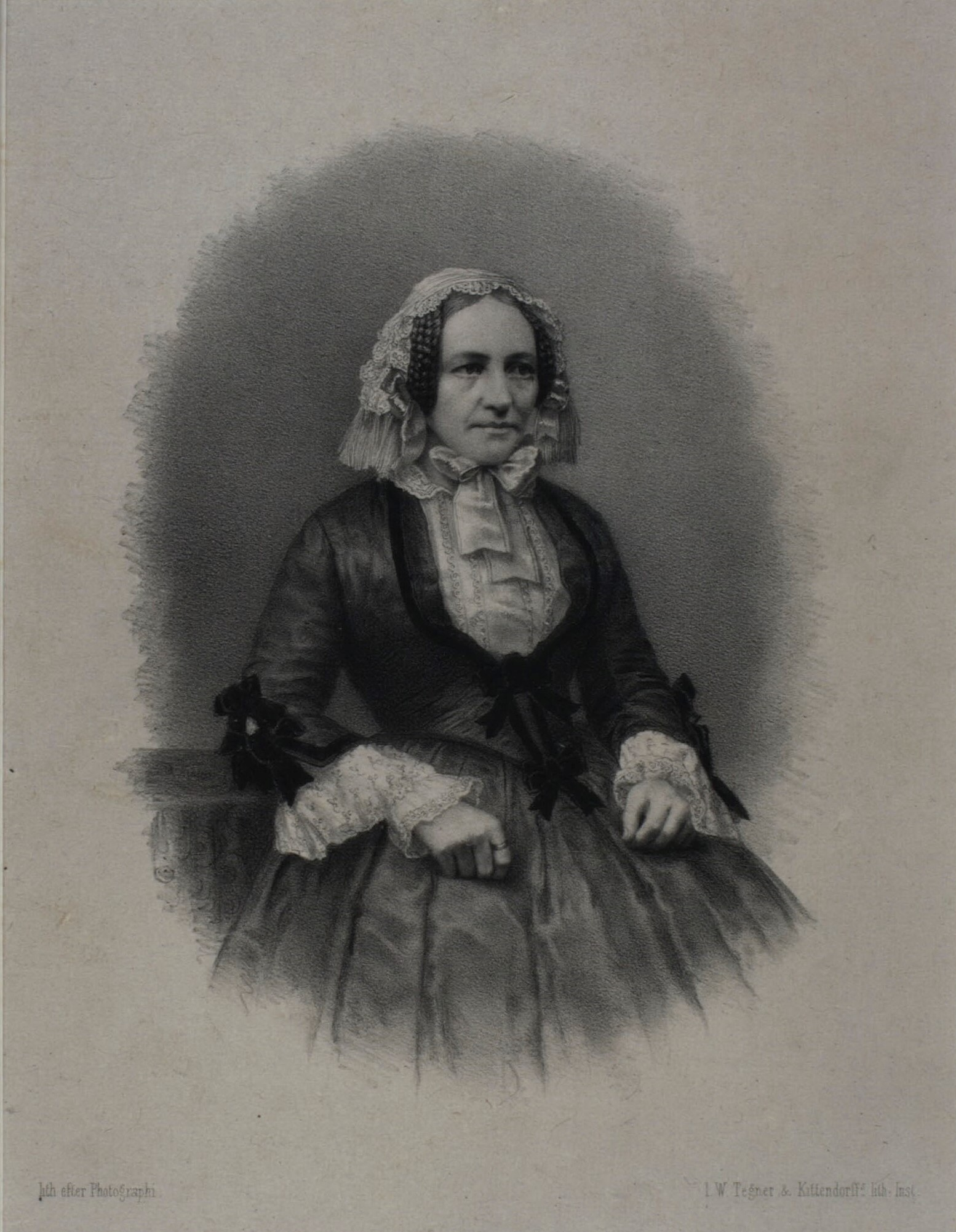
Frederikke Charlotte Christiansen

Elter was no longer a member of the household at the next census in 1840. Christian Christiansen and Frederikke Charlote Konopera were now residing in the building with their now five children (aged two to 10), an office clerk, one lodger, one male servant and three maids. Johanne Kirstine Møller was still managing the tavern in the basement. Christian Christiansen was again still residing in the building with their children at the time of the 1850 census.

The side wing was constructed for Christiansen in 1850–51.

The property was home to 17 residents in five households in 1860. Eduard Kristiansen, a naval lieutenant, resided in the building on his own. Edvard Helsted, a violinist in the Royal Danish Orchestra, resided in the building with his wife Louise Eleonora Augusta Helsted and one maid. Severin Eduard Bojesen (1802-1881), a chief inspector at the city's Poor Authority with title of kancelliråd, resided in the building with his wife Jensine Cecilie Bojesen and their 18-year-old son Sigurd Bojesen. Jess Fæster Eiler, a retired civil servant with title of kammerråd, resided in the building with two maids and one lodger. David Davidsen, a barkeeper, resided in the basement with his wife Ane Davidsen (née Jacobsen), their two children (aged one and three), one maid and one lodger.

=== 1880 census ===
The property was home to 21 residents at the 1880 census. Heimand Theodor Christiansen, a businessman, (grosserer), resided on the ground floor with his housekeeper. Theodor Green, another businessman (grosserer), resided on the first floor with his wife Anna Green (née Hansen), a female cook and a nanny. Herman David Lassen, another businessman (grosserer), resided on the second floor with his wife Anna Margrethe Lassen, his sister H??? Augusta Lassen and one maid. Thorkild Møller, a grocer (urtelræmmer), resided on the third floor (and the garret) with his wife Anna Marie Møller née Jensen, their three children (aged zero to two), one male servant, one maid and two apprentices.

== Architecture ==
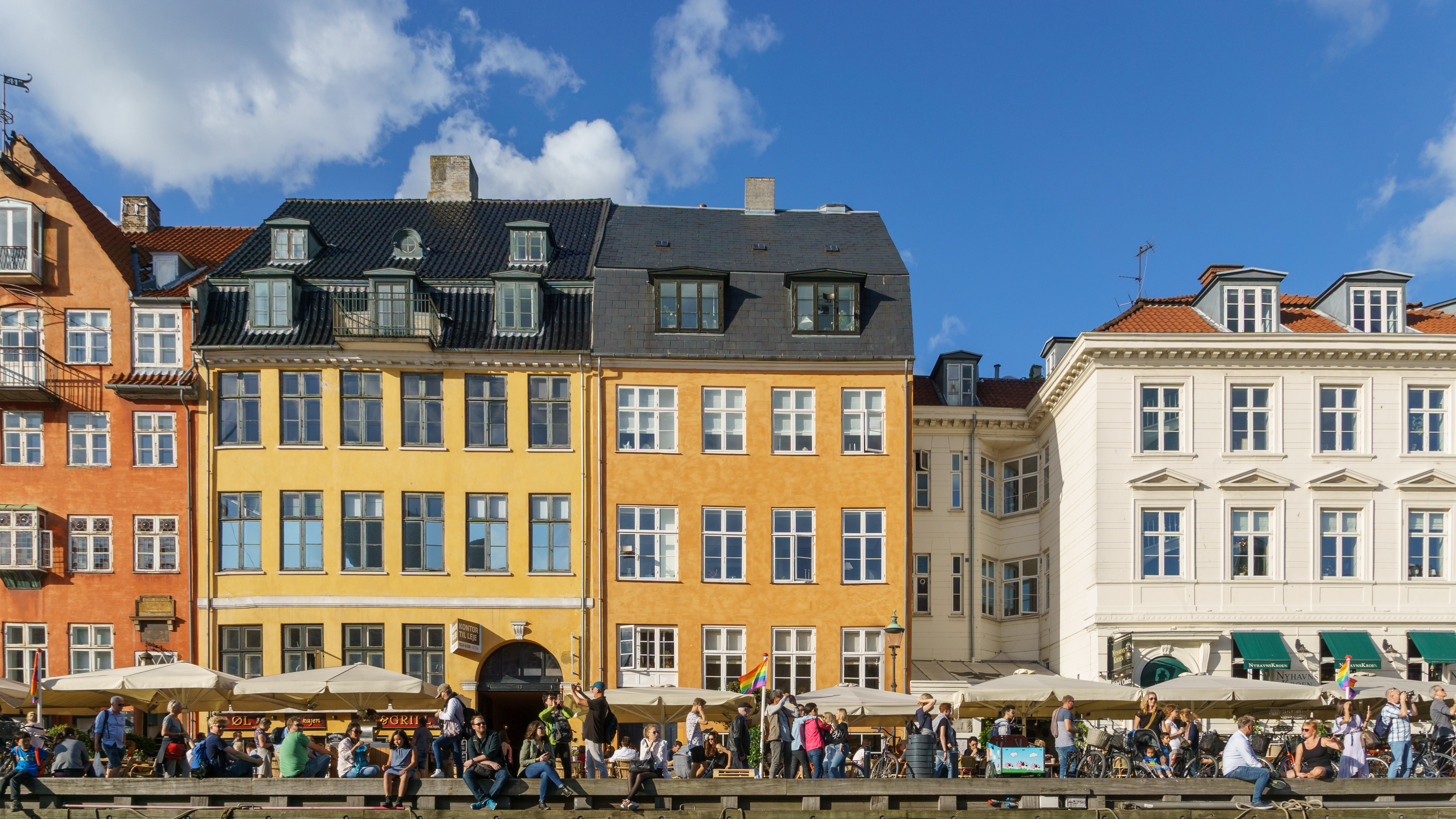
Nyhavn 45 seen from the other side of the canal

Nyhavn 45 was originally constructed with two storeys over a walk-out basement, in brick towards the street and with timber framing towards the yard. The facade was then crowned by a two-bay wall dormer. The third storey was added in 1794. A warehouse was constructed on its rear in 1801. A six-bay side wing was constructed in 1794 along the eastern side of a narrow, central courtyard, attaching the two older buildings to each other. The front wing and the side wing are physically integrated via an outwardly curved corner bay. The yard is separated from that of Nyhavn 43 by a wall.

The four-bay-wide facade is plastered and ochre-painted with white-painted windows and a white-painted cornice. The gateway in the extra wide bay furthest to the left and the basement entrance in the third bay are both blue-painted. The mansard roof features two dormer windows towards the street. The yard side of all three wings are rendered yellow. The side wing is topped by a monopitched roof. The facade of the former warehouse on the rear is crowned by a wall dormer.

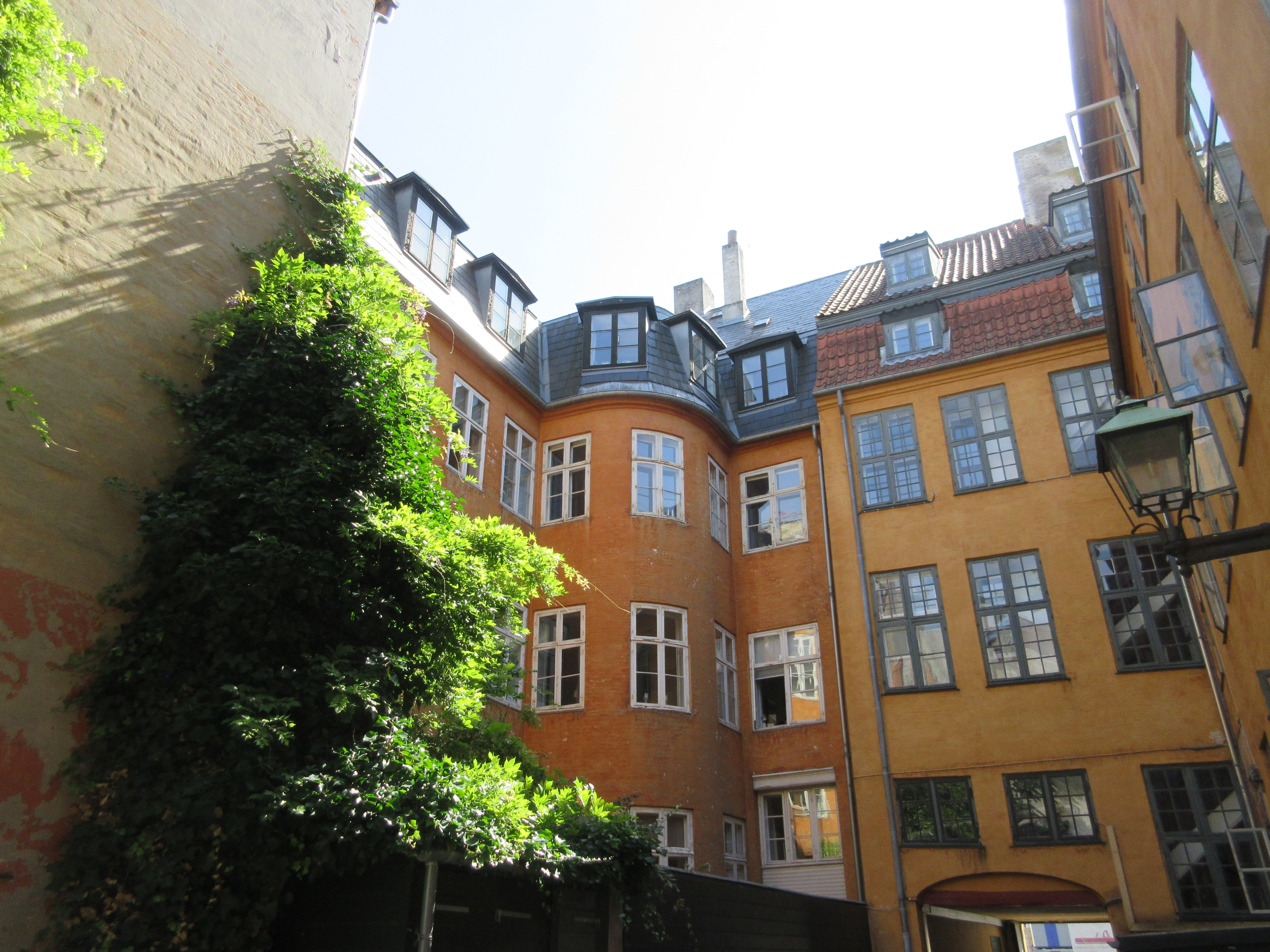
The rear side of the front wing (right) and the side wing (left) with the outwardly curved corner structure

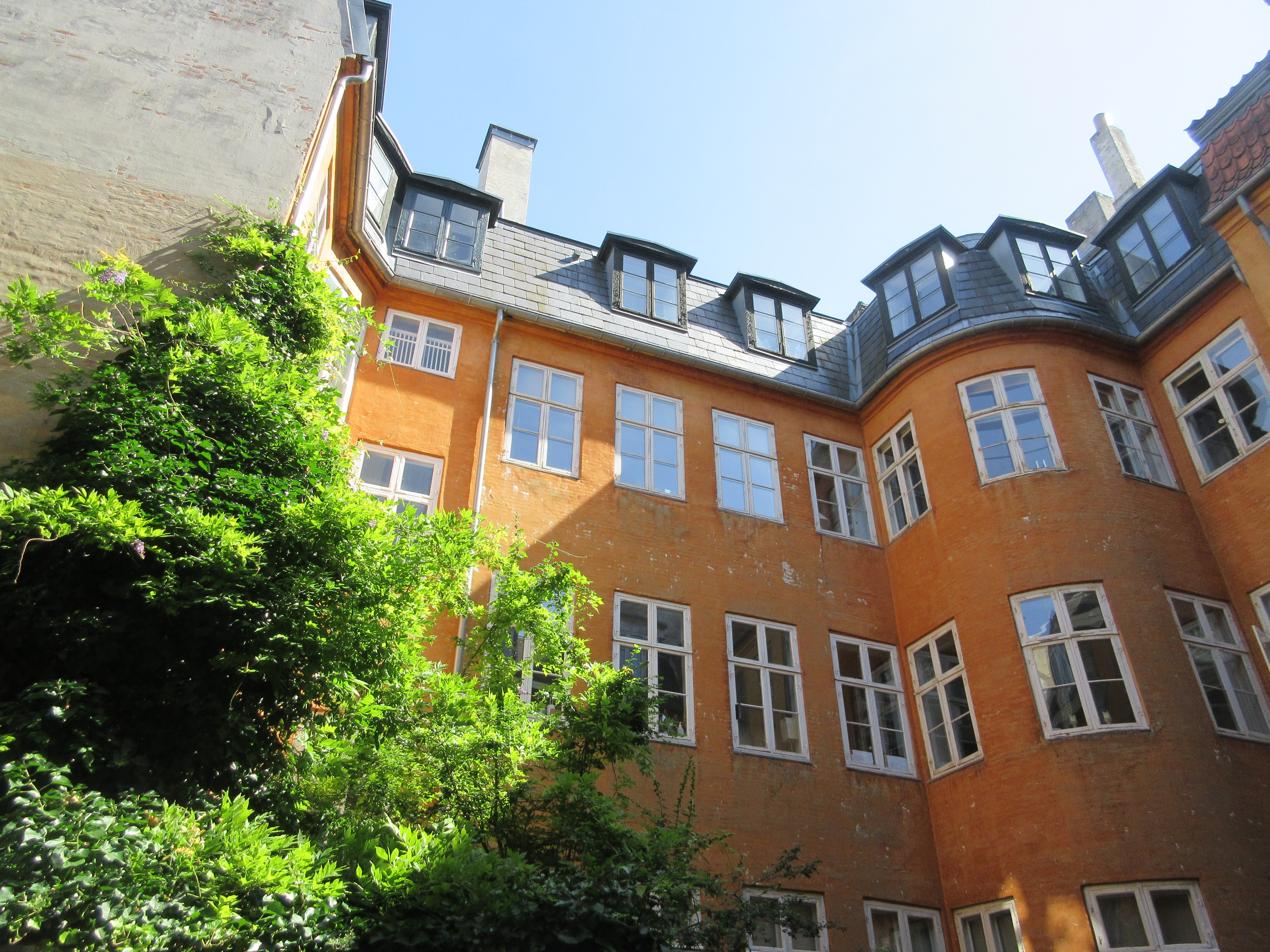
The side wing

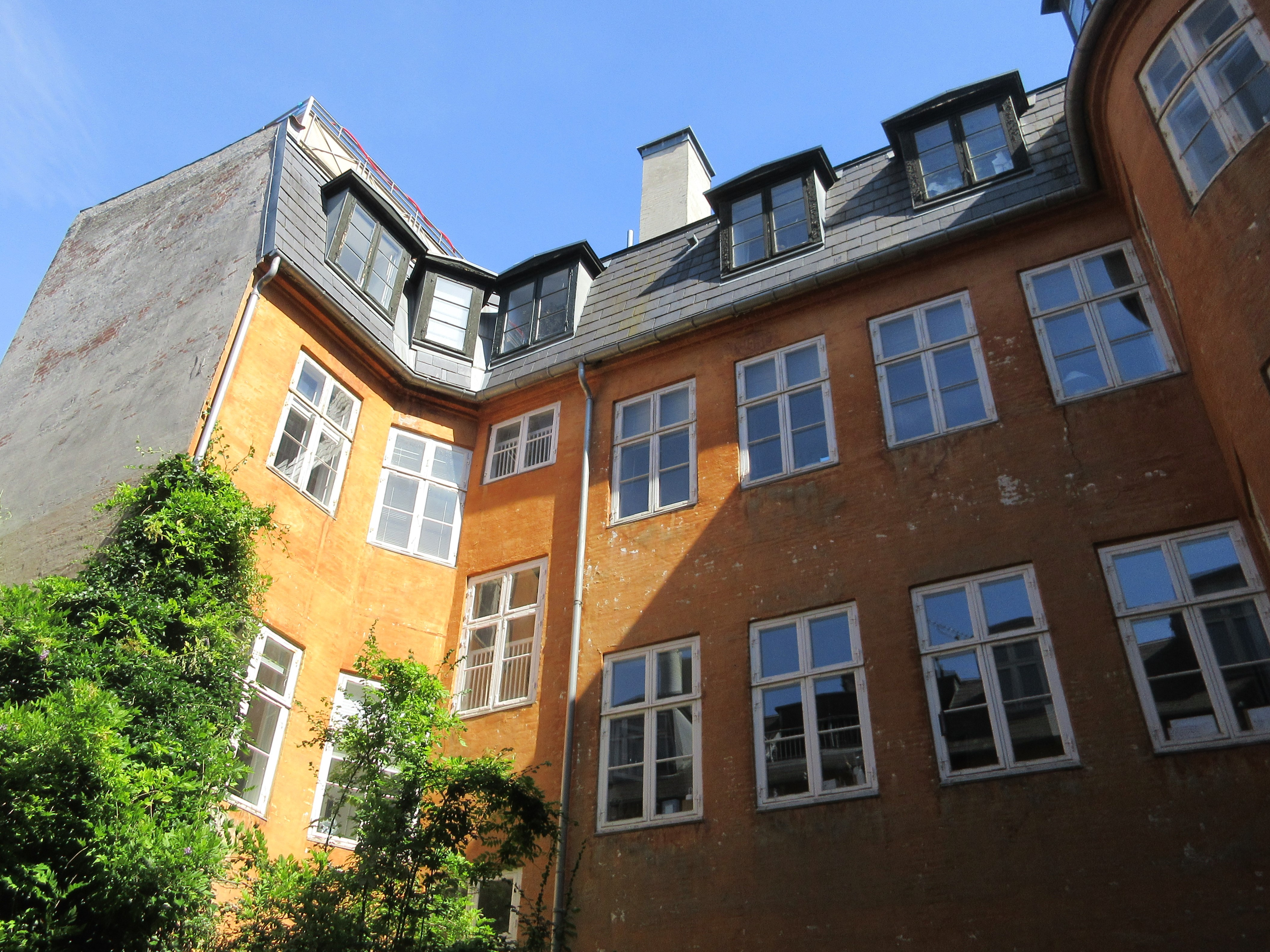
The side wing (eight) and the short rear wing (left)

== Today ==
The building is owned by Nyhavn 43 A/S.
