= Nyhavn 9 =

Building in Copenhagen, Denmark

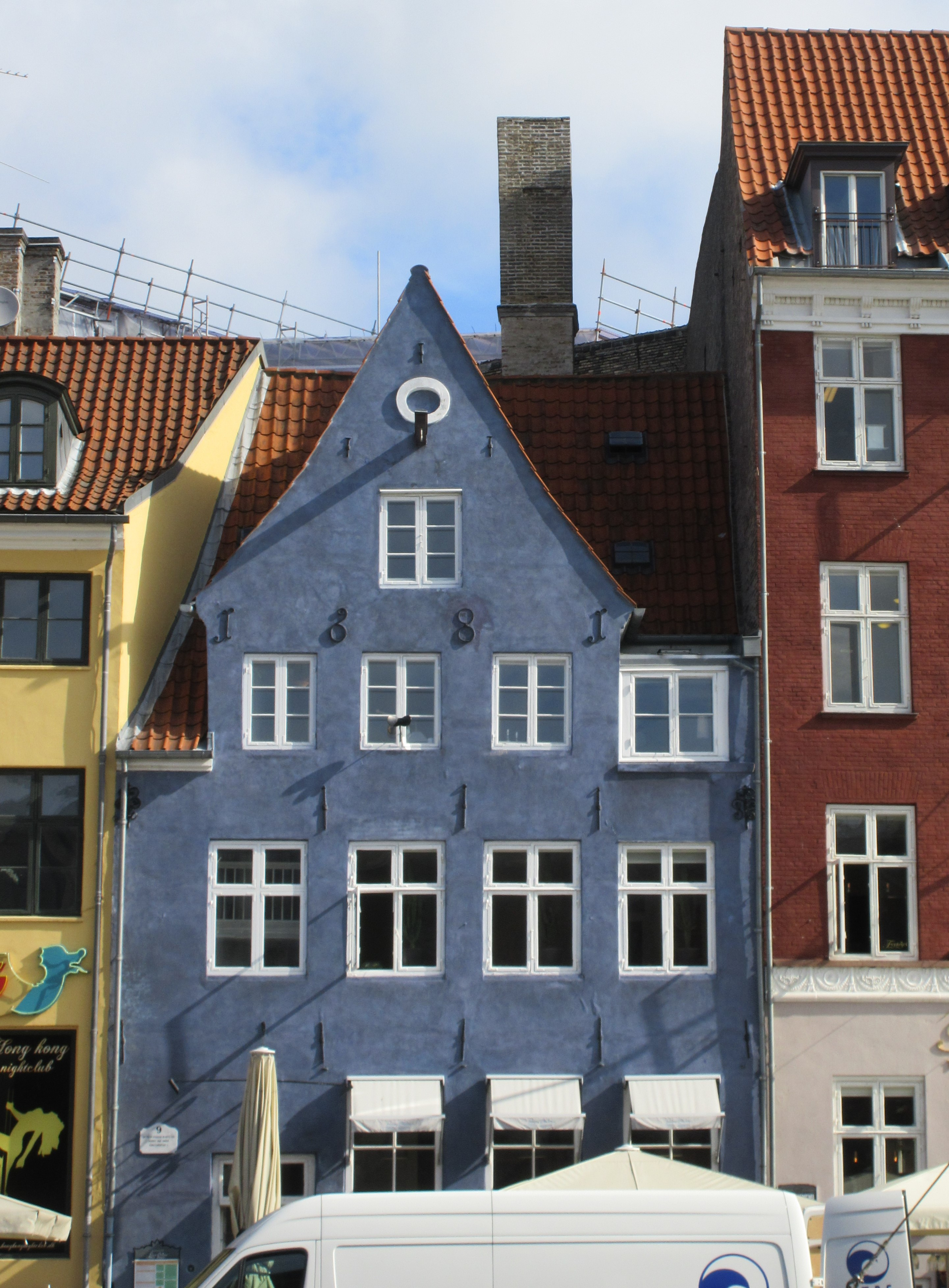
- The house seen from the other side of the canal
- Interactive map of the Nyhavn 9 area

General information
- Location: Copenhagen, Denmark
- Coordinates: 55°40′50.76″N 12°35′19.4″E
- Completed: 1681

Nyhavn 9 is a historic townhouse overlooking the Nyhavn Canal in central Copenhagen, Denmark. It dates back to the 17th century and is one of few buildings along the canal that was not heightened in the 19th century. The building was listed on the Danish Registry of Protected Buildings and Places in 1918. It houses a restaurant on the ground floor.

== History ==
=== 17th century ===
The Nyhavn Canal was constructed in 1671-73 to a masterplan created by the Dutch fortification engineer Henrik Ruse. The house at No. 9 was built in 1681, most likely for dock manager (havnemester) Christen Christensen. Rüse was for a while among the residents. Another notable former resident is military officer and first director of the Royal Danish Theatre Hans Wilhelm von Warnstedt. The property was listed in Copenhagen's first cadastre of 1689 as No. 5 in St. Ann's East Quarter (Sankt Annæ Øster Kvarter), owned by beer seller (øltapper) Anders Thomsen.

=== 18th century ===
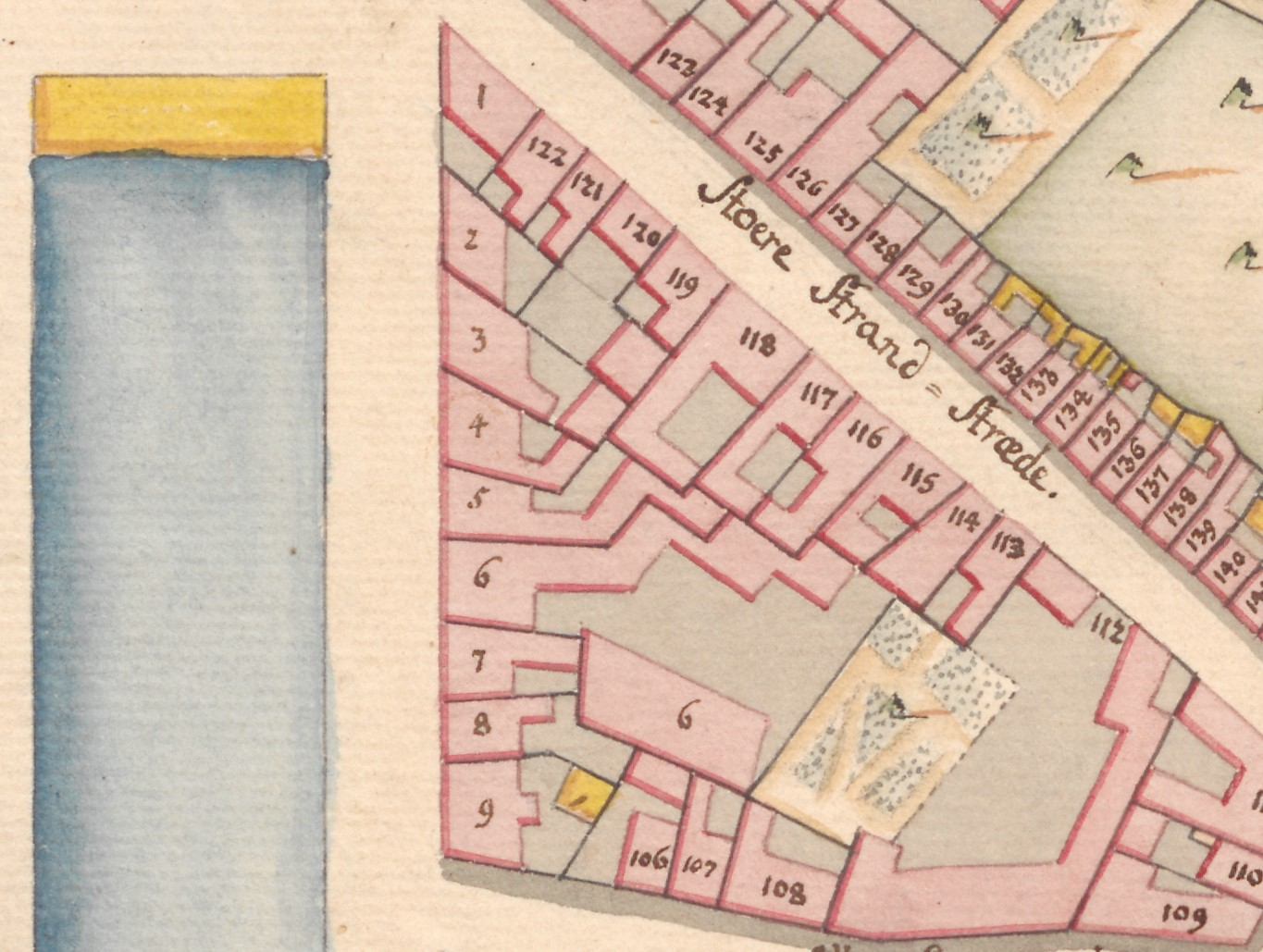
No. 5 seen in a detail from Christian Gedde's map of St. Ann's East Quarter, 1757

The property was later owned by sailmaker Andreas Pedersen Sangaard (died 1757). His brother Ole Pedersen Sangaard (died 1759) was a sailmaker at No. 24 (now Nyhavn 45).Andreas Pedersen Sangaard was married to Christine Olsdatter Baasted.

The property was again listed as No. 5 in the new cadastre of 1756. It belonged to Jens Larsen, a merchant specializing in trade with Iceland.

At the time of the 1787 census, No. 5 was home to three households. Rasmus Eschildsen, a skipper, resided in the building with his wife Anna Holmsdatter, their three sons (aged 11 to 18, all of them sailors), a maid and two lodgers. Otto Diederich Hansen, a clerk working for the Class-Lottery, resided in the building with his wife Agnete Rasmus Datter, their 11-year-old daughter Gyde Kirstine, a maid and three lodgers. Johannes Olsen Holm, a ship carpenter, resided in the building with his wife Anna Maria, a 19-year-old daughter from the wife's first marriage, a maid and a lodger.

=== 19th century ===
At the time of the 1801 census, No. 5 was home to two households. Niels Hviding, a bookkeeper, resided in the building with his wife Ide Nørager, their three children (aged six to 10), the wife's 70-year-old mother and 27-year-old sister and one maid. Terkild Rasmussen Hem, a grocer (spækhøker), resided in the building with his wife Johanne Christensdatter.

In the new cadastre of 1806, the property was again listed as No. 5. It was at that time owned by Frederik Chrisitan Rømer, a sugar manufacturer, who also owned the adjacent building at No. 6 (now Nyhavn 11).

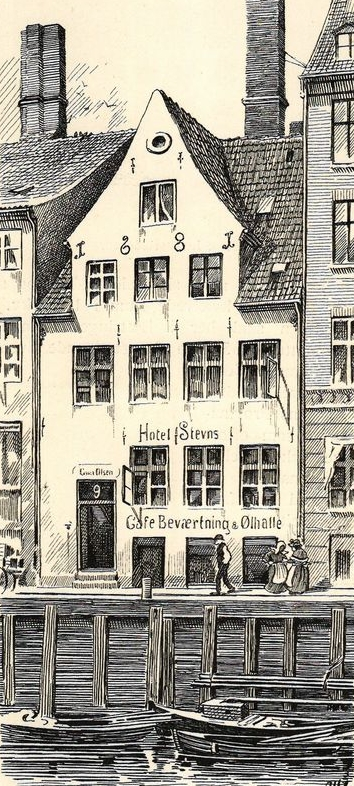
Hotel Stevns

Bladkompagniet, a publishing house, was based in the building from 1822.

At the time of the 1834 census, No. 5 was home to three households. Christian Sørensen, the proprietor of a tavern on the ground floor, resided in the associated dwelling with his wife Ane Niels Datter, two nieces (aged 19 and 29), a 14-year-old boy and two maids. Kristine Frederiche Flensburg, a 30-year-old widow with a pension and means, resided on the first floor with her 33-year-old brother Niels Larsen Berg (a first mate, skibsfører), her 11-year-old foster daughter Jensine Bolette Flensburg and one maid. Niels Grønbek Rademacher, a 22-year-old miller, resided alone on the second floor.

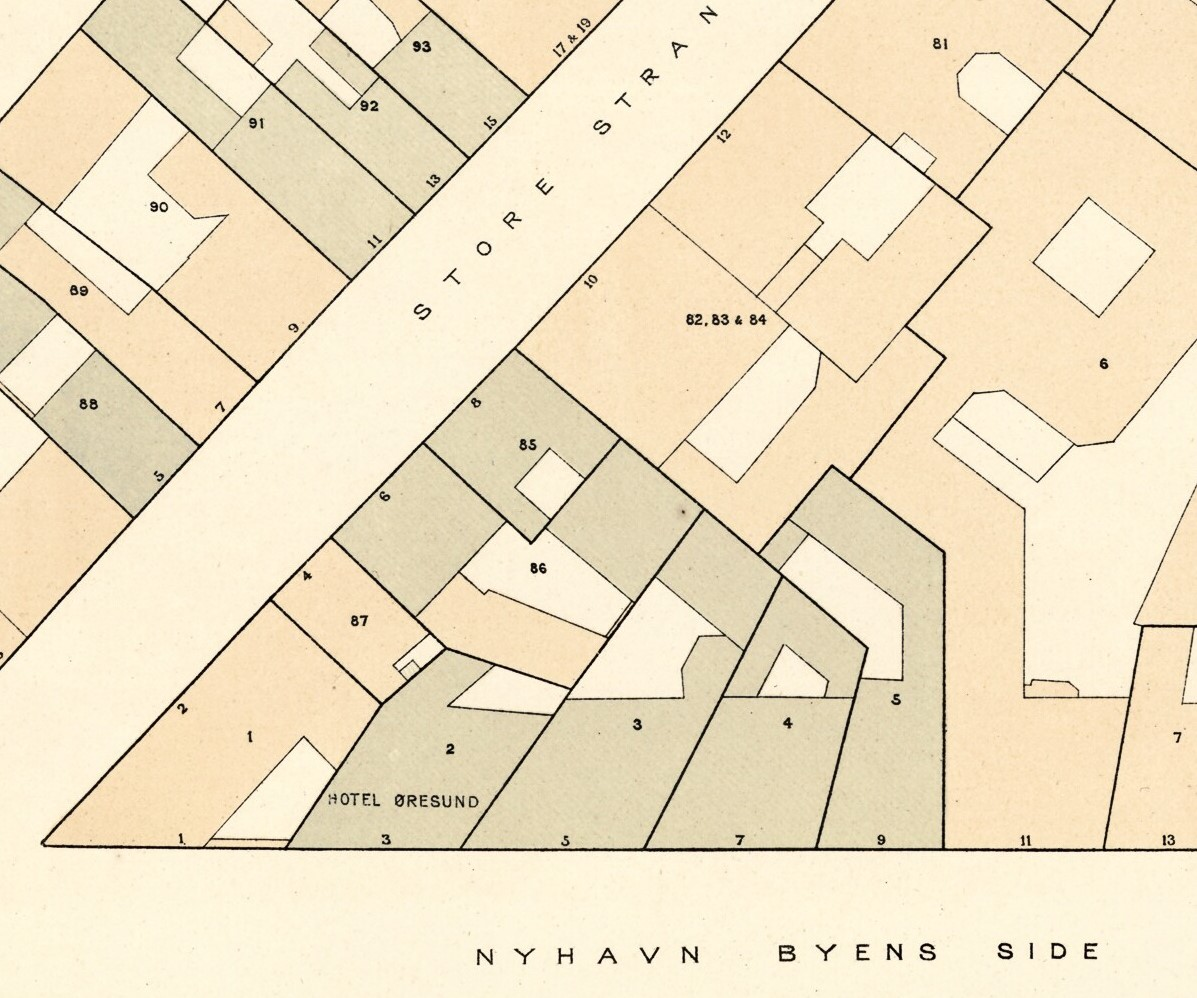
Nyhavn 9 seen on one of Berggreen's block plans of St. Ann's East Quarter

At the time of the 1840 census, No. 5 was home to just seven people. Lorentze Thalia Theresia Thygesen (née Selmer), widow of justitsråd and bank manager Aksel Møller Thygesen (1763-1818), resided on the first floor with the 40-year-old unmarried woman Susanne Jacobine Selmer, a housekeeper, a female cook and two maids. Matthias Fries, a 28-year-old teacher at the Royal Danish Naval Academy, resided alone on the second floor.

The basement and ground floor was for many years operated as a guesthouse and tavern under the name Hotel Stevns. It was later replaced by an entertainment venue called Safari and then Nyhavnskroen. The Danish operations of a German bank and insurance company was in 1900 based in the building.

=== 20th century ===
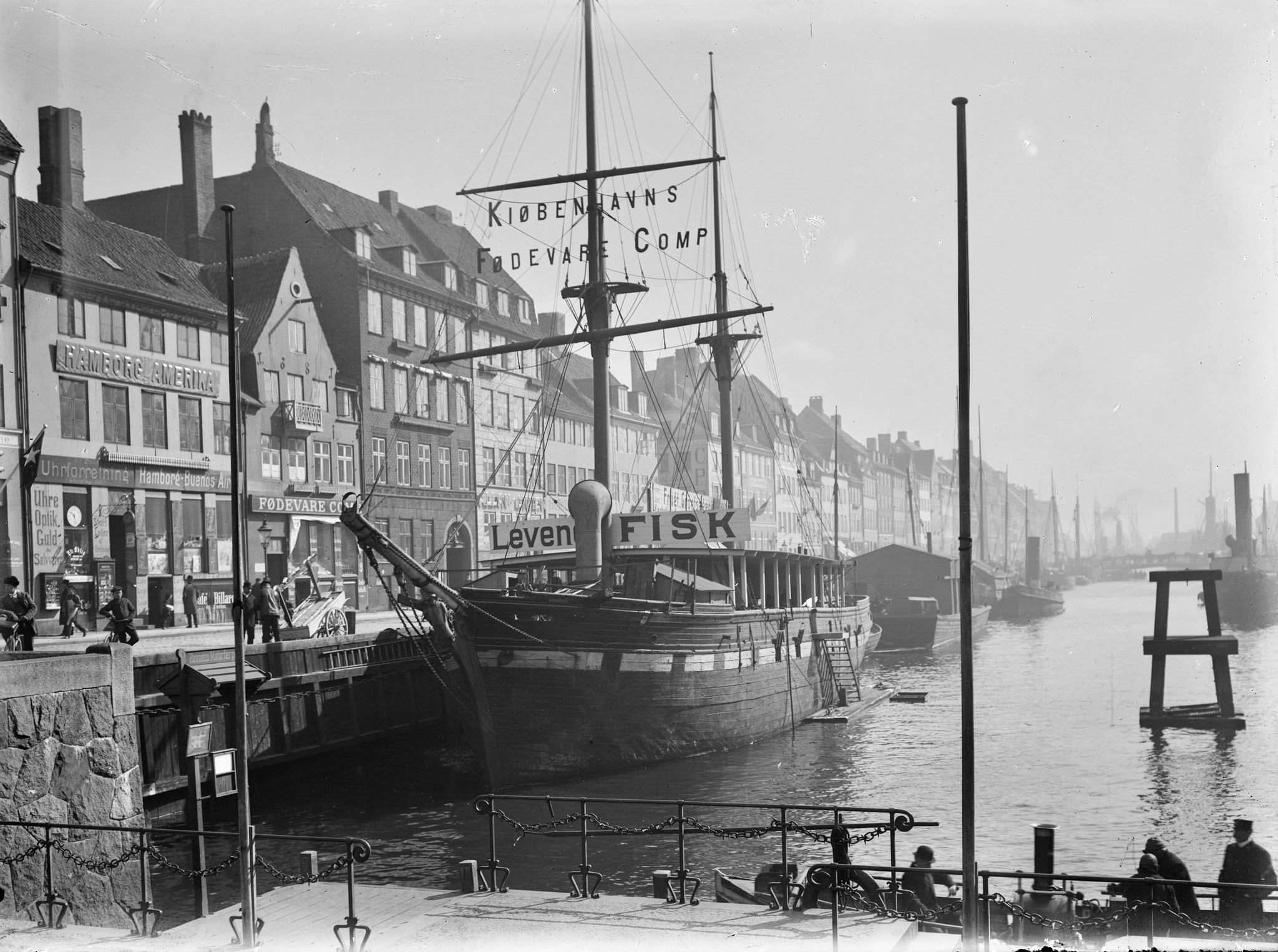
Kjøbenhavns fødevare Compagnie's ship and building seen in a photograph by Peter Elfelt, 1909

A branch of a German bank was by 1900 based in the building. It was later succeeded by Kjøbenhavns fødevare Compagnie, a food company. The company sold fresh fish from a ship berthed in the canal in front of the building.

Erik Gyldenkrone-Rysensteen, an 11th generation descendant of Henrik Rysensten, acquired Nyhavn 11 in 1981. He had purchased the schooner Isefjord and operated it as a restaurant ship on the Øresund from the premises.

== Architecture ==
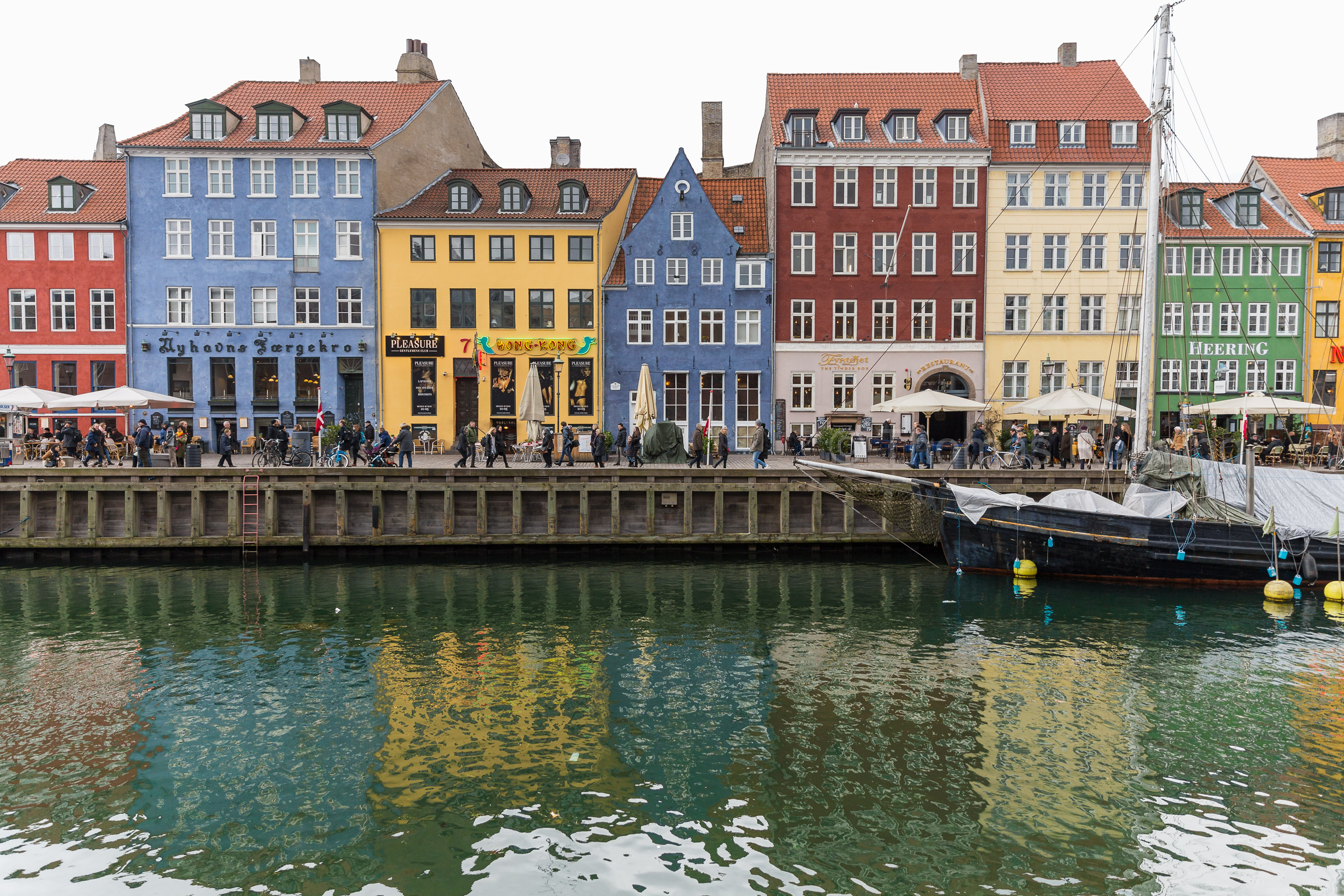
Nyhavn 5-15

Nyhavn 9 is a typical canal house. It was not, unlike many other buildings along the canal, heightened in the 19th century. The complex also comprises a side wing that extends from the rear side of the building, a cross wing that separates two consecutive courtyards and a rear wing. It was listed on the Danish Registry of Protected Buildings and Places in 1918.

== Today ==
The property has since 1982 been owned by Christel Windfeld-Lund. She does not herself live in the building. Restaurant Leonora Christine is based in the cellar.
