= Nyhavn 47 =

Listed building in Copenhagen

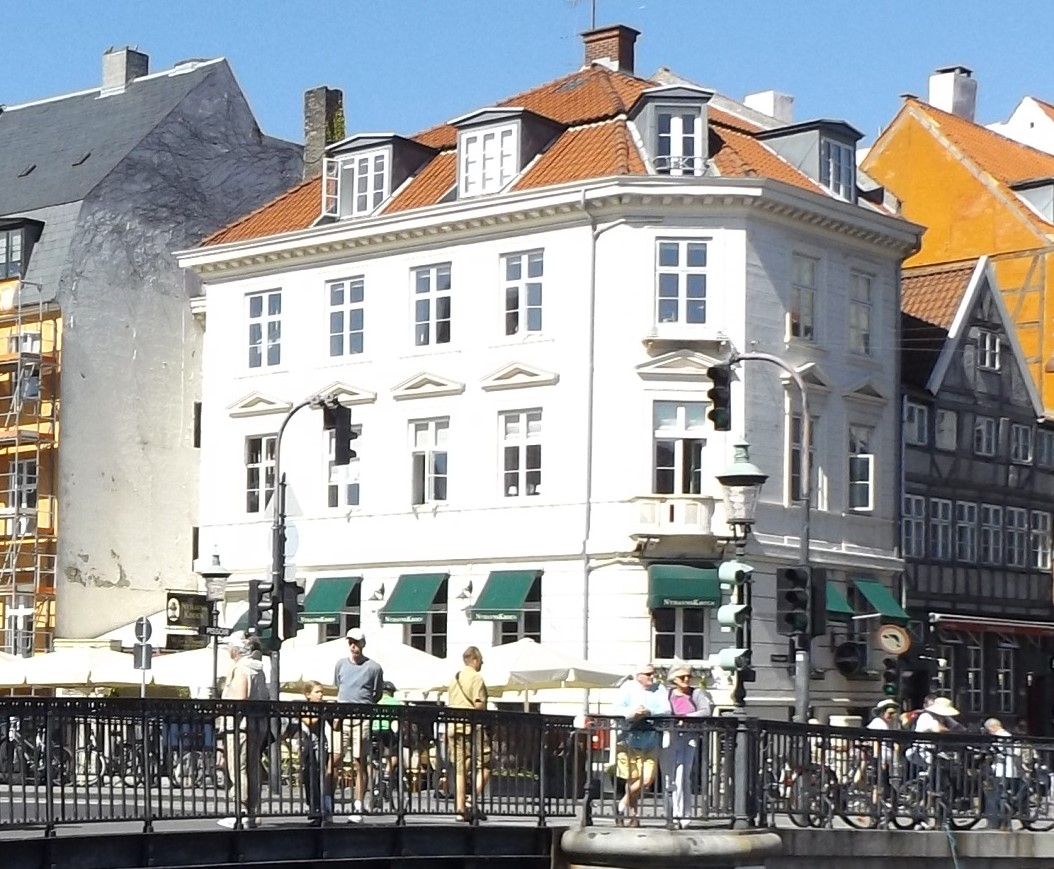
- Interactive map of the Nyhavn 47 area

General information
- Location: Copenhagen, Denmark
- Coordinates: 55°40′47.78″N 12°35′28.75″E
- Completed: 1730s
- Renovated: 1842–45. 1875

Nyhavn 47 is an 18th-century property situated at the corner of Nyhavn (No. 47) and Toldbodgade (No. 2) in central Copenhagen, Denmark. It owes its current appearance to a renovation undertaken by Julius Andreas Blom in 1842–45. It was listed in the Danish registry of protected buildings and places in 1932. Notable former residents include the merchant and shipowner Peter Christian Knudtzon.

== History ==
=== Early history ===
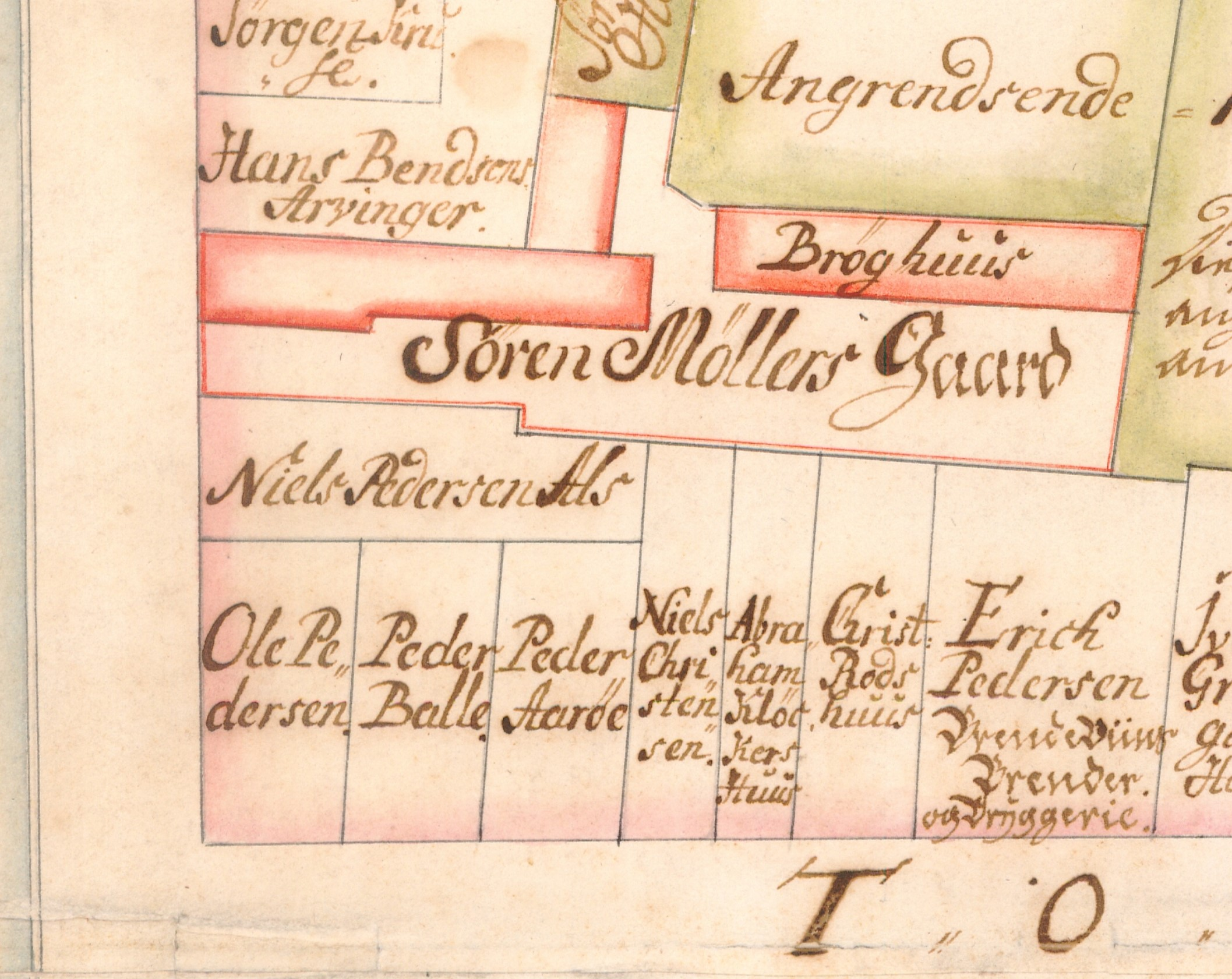
The property seen in a plan from 1731

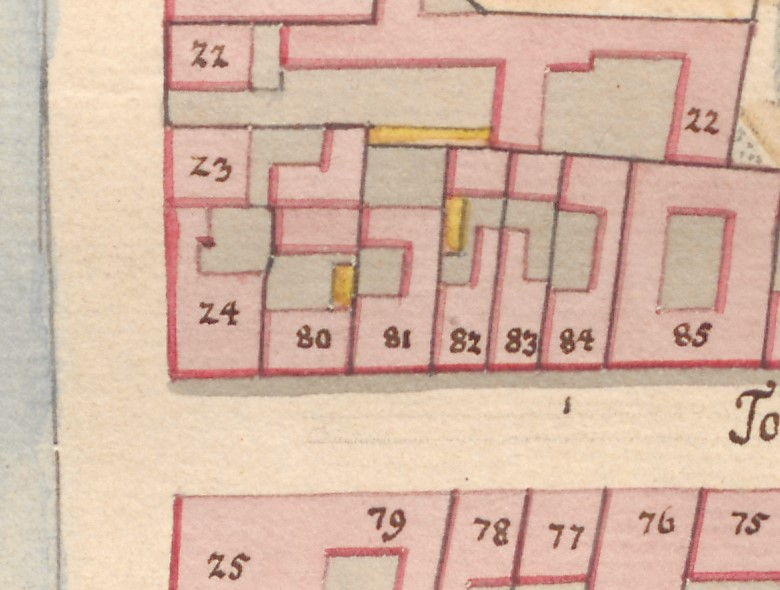
No. 24 seen in a detail from Christian Gedde's map of St. Ann's East Quarter, 1757

The site was in the late 17th century part of a much larger property. The large property was listed as No. 28 in St. Ann's East Quarter in Copenhagen's first cadastre of 1689 and was at that time owned by tanner Villum Lydersen. It was later divided into four smaller properties (now Nyhavn 41–47). The present building on the site was probably constructed in 1737-38 for skipper Ole Pedersen. The property was listed as No. 24 in the new cadastre of 1756 and was then still owned by sailmaker Ole Pedersen.

=== Hans Peter Sandgaard ===
The property was later acquired by sailmaker Hans Peter Sandgaard. His property was home to three households at the 1787 census. The owner resided in the building with his wife Ellen Maria, his sister Maria Margrethe Scheekel, six apprentices (aged 16 to 25) and one maid. Christian Samuel Heisse, an office clerk (skriverkarl) working for Erich Erichsen, resided in another apartment with his wife Karen Maria Holms Datter, their one-year-old son Carl Johan Heisse, his mother-in-law Sara Marttha Holm and one maid. Carsten Hansen, a beer seller (øltapper), resided in the third apartment with his wife Maren Odels Datter and three lodgers (all of whom were sailors).

The number of residents had increased to 22 at the time of the 1801 census. Sandgaard resided in the building with his wife, three apprentices and one maid. Frodenus Christian Jørgensen (1761-), a broker (mægler), resided in another apartment with his wife Dorothea Elisabeth Buntzen (1776-1867), daughter of Johan Buntzen and Anne Bolette Sandgaard, Nyhavn 67), their three children (aged one to five) and two maids. Poul Poulsen, a beer seller (øltapper), resided in the building with his wife Anne Margrethe Bledel, their 17-year-old daughter Mette Margrethe Poulsen, one maid and five lodgers.

The property was again listed as No. 24 in the new cadastre of 1806. It was at that time still owned by Sandgaard.

=== Rasmus Andreas Holm ===
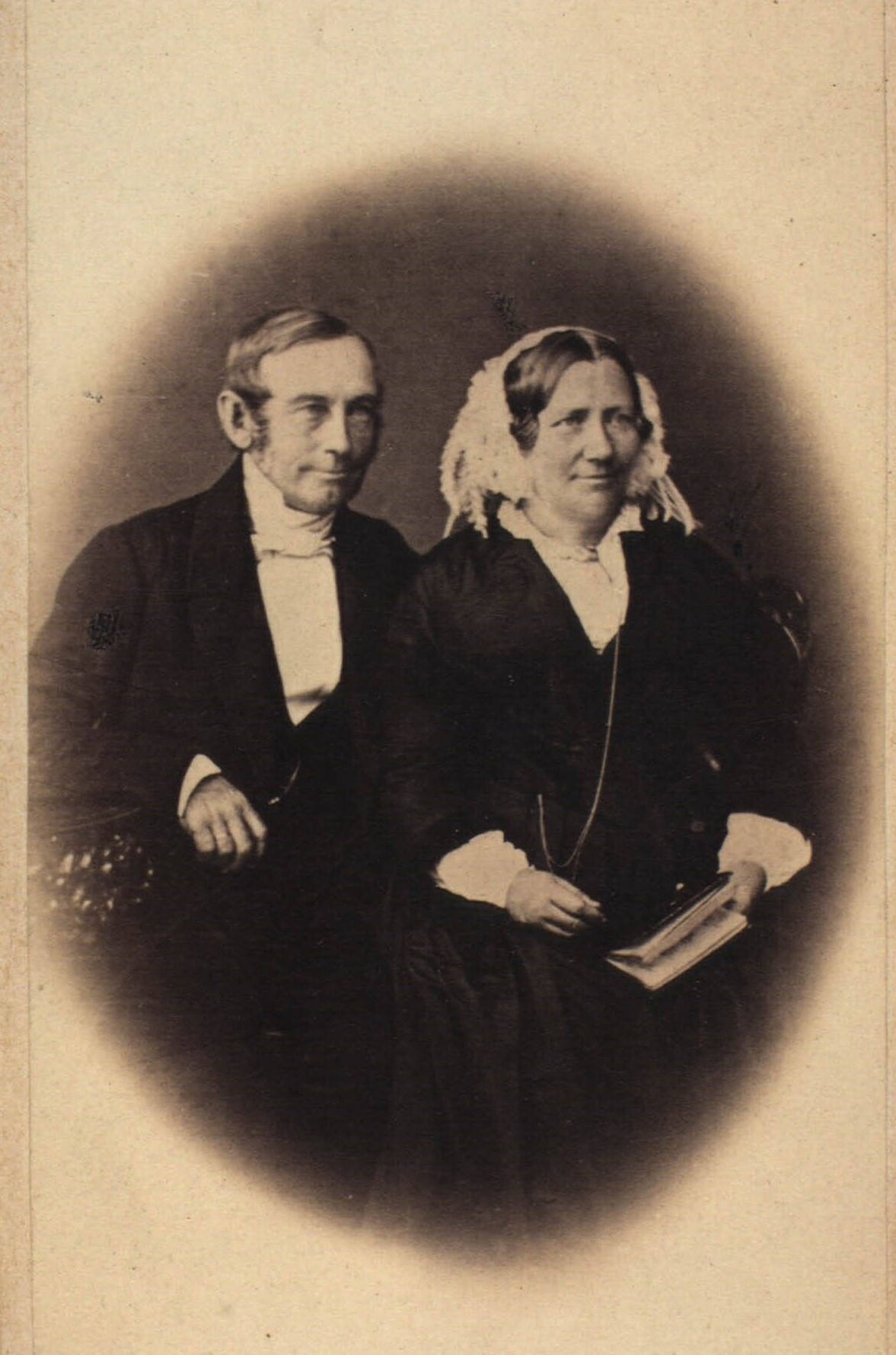
Rasmus and Christiane Holm

The property was later acquired by master sailmaker Rasmus Andreas Holm (1799-1863), son of sailmaker Peter Holm (1764-1812). His father had been the owner of the adjacent property at No. 23 (now Nyhavn 45). On 10 January 1820, Rasmus Andreas Holm had married Christiane Mammen (1805-1877), a foster daughter of his uncle Jacob Holm.

At the time of the next census, in 1834, Holm's property was home to 25 residents in five households. Rasmus and Christiane Holm resided on the ground floor with their two children (aged two and five), three apprentices and two maids. Carl Friderichsen (1801-1849), a helmsman, resided on the first floor with his wife Præbene (née Jantzen, 1807-1880), their two children (aged one and four) and one maid. Madsine Sophie Holm, Rasmus Holm's mother, resided on the second floor with her son Hendrich Peter Holm. Rasmus Bang, a sailmaker employed by Holm, was also resident on the second floor with his wife Christiane Christensen and their three children (aged three to seven). Peter Nicolajsen Skjerbeck, a barkeeper, resided in the basement with his wife Juliana Marie Kock, their 12-year-old son and one maid.

At the time of the 1840 census, Holm's property was home to 24 residents in four households. Holm's household comprised his wife, their now four children (aged two to 11), four apprentices and two maids. Peter Gottschalck (1799-1863), a clerk (hofskriver) at Prince Ferdinand's court. resided on the first floor with his wife Nicoline Zimmer (1798-1877) and one maid. Madsine Holm was still residing on the second floor. She now lived there with her cousin Birgitte Haagensen. Johan Caspersen. a sailor, resided in the basement with his wife Sophie Jensen, their two-year-old son, a six-year-old boy in their care, one maid and two lodgers.

=== 1843–1900 ===
In 1842–45, Julius Andreas Blom (1815-1900) was responsible for a comprehensive renovation of the building. Blom was the son of master mason Thomas Blom.

The building was home to 18 residents in three households at the time of the 1845 census. Anders Hansen Brandt (1803-1860), a grocer (urtekræmmer) and principal (forstander), resided in the building with his wife Bertha Margrethe Brandt (née Hansen, 1808–1868), their five children (aged one to 19), three male servants and one maid. Thønnes Petersen Dahl, a ship captain, resided in the building with his wife Johanne Caroline Dahl, their 11-year-old foster daughter and one maid. Madsine Holm was still resident on the second floor with her son Peter Holm and one maid.

=== Peter Christian Knudtzon ===
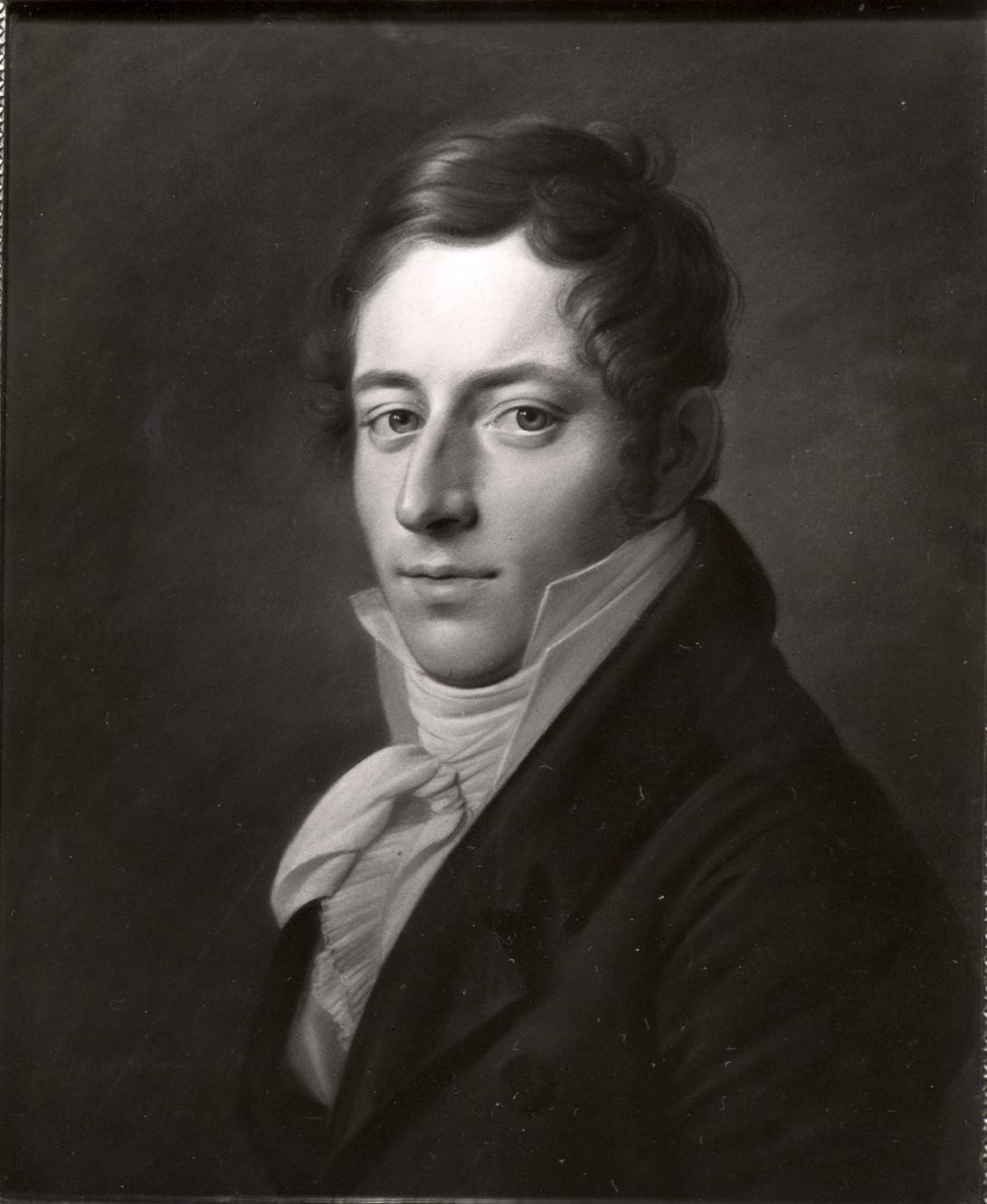
Peter Crjistian Knudtzon

In the mid-1840s the property was acquired by the businessman Peter Christian Knudtzon. In 1843 his bankruptcy had forced him to sell his old property at Nyhavn 31 but capital from his brothers in Norway enabled him to make a quick comeback. He constructed a new building on the site. He was married to Ludinda Gotschalk, a daughter of the businessman Friedrich Gotschal. At the time of the 1850 census, Knudtzon and his wife lived in the building with their five children (aged one to nine), one male servant and four maids.

In 1859, Knutzon purchased the property at Amaliegade 14. According to his son's memoirs, the family had already moved in 1856.

The property at the corner of Nyhavn and Toldbodgade was later owned by furrier H.F. Brinckmann. In 1985, he filled out the gap between Nyhavn 47 and Nyhavn 45 with a recessed side wing.

=== 1860 census ===
The property was home to 17 residents at the 1860 census. Marine Kirstine Rasmussen, a widow, resided in the building with one maid and the 68-year-old unmarried woman Ulrikke Flor. The widows Ellen Barbara Abigal Hall, Auguste Elisabeth Husselbulch and Catarine Marie Jørgensen were also residents of the building. Niels Anton Schouv, a teacher, resided in the building with his wife Emilie Birgitte Schouv, his mother Marie Kirstine Schouv, 62-year-old Frederikke Gerner and two maids. Anders Nielsen, a barkeeper, resided in the basement with his wife Marie Nielsen, their three-year-old son and two maids.

=== 1880 census ===
At the 1880 census, Nyhavn 49 was home to 21 residents. Baldur Harald Valdemar Ravn, a wholesaler (grosserer), resided on the ground floor with one maid. Jens Giødvad Zinn (1836-1926), an architect, resided on the second floor with his wife Emma Zenn (née Møller), their two daughters (aged one and four) and one maid. Johan Heinrich Fritz Brinckmann, with title of court furrier, resided on the third floor (and the garret) with his wife Lovise Ingerline Vilhelmine (née Jensen), their 27-year-old son Frederik Vilhelm Alvild Brinckmann and two maids. Vilhelm Theodor Petersen, a retailer, resided in the basement with his wife Anna Christine (née Bach), their five children (aged one to 10), his sister-in-law Dorthea Christine Sørensen and the clerk (handelsbetjent) Hans Christian Hansen.

=== 20th century ===
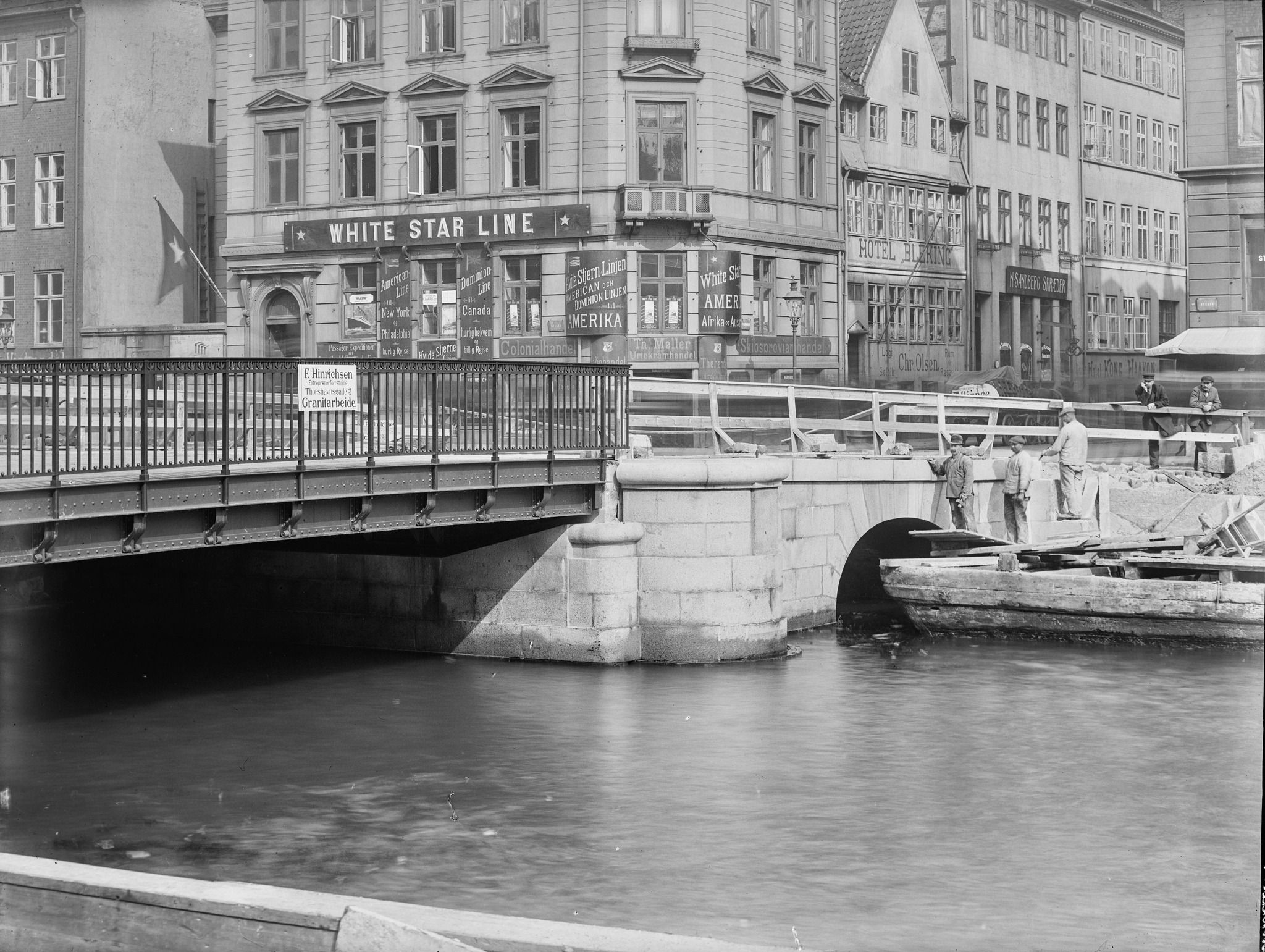
The building with advertisement for the White Star Line seen in the background on a photograph by Peter Elfelt, 1913

A grocery shop was for many years based on the ground floor of the building. The White Star Line's ticket agency was located on the first floor in the 1910s.

== Architecture ==
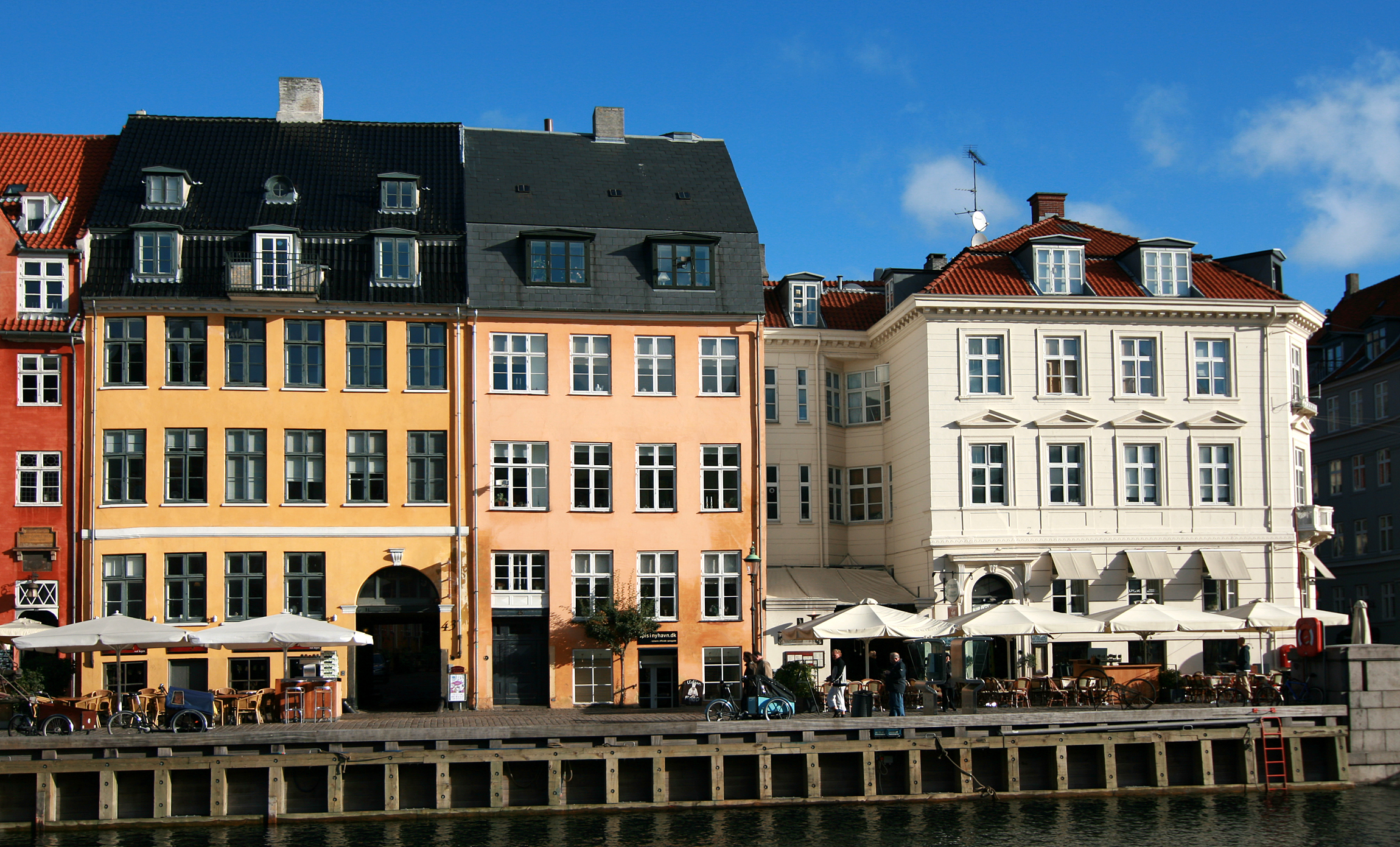
Nyhavn 47 with the recessed side wing seen from the other side of the canal

Nyhavn 47 is constructed with three storeys over a walk-out basement. It has a four-bays-long facade on Nyhavn, a just two-bays-long facade on Toldbodgade and a chamfered corner bay. The plastered facade is finished with shadow joints, a wide frieze below the first floor windows, triangular pediments above the first floor windows and a modillioned cornice. The chamfered corner features a small balcony supported by heavy corbels on the first floor and a built-in flower box supported by corbels on the second floor. Nyhavn 47 is via a recessed two-bay connector from 1845 attached to Nyhavn 45.

== Today ==
As of 2008, Nyhavn 47 belonged to Niels-Jørgen Frandsen. Nyhavnskroen, a restaurant serving a traditional Danish cuisine, is based on the ground floor. McJoy's, a British-style gastro pub, is based in the basement.
