= Nyhavn 31 =

Building in Copenhagen, Denmark

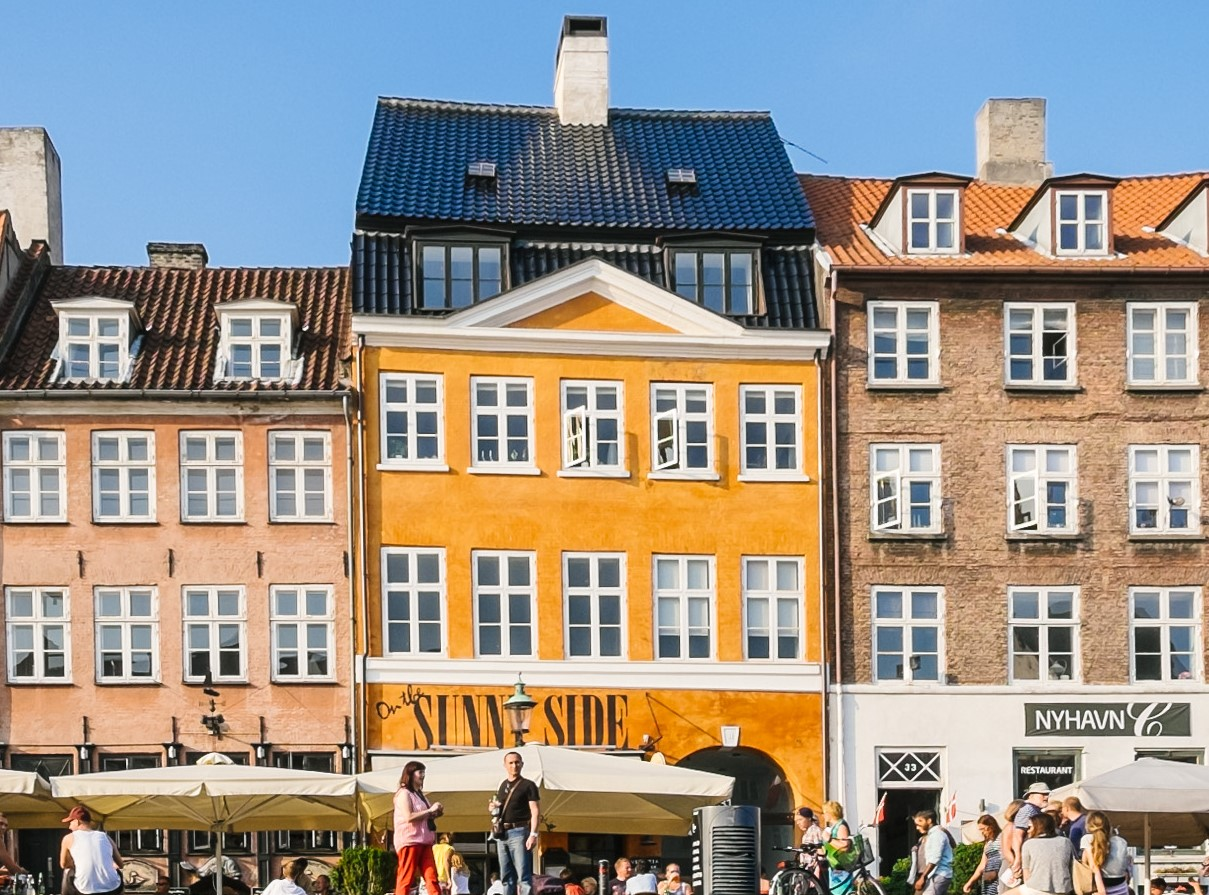
- Nyhavn 31 seen from the other side of the canal
- Interactive map of the Nyhavn 31 area

General information
- Location: Copenhagen, Denmark, Denmark
- Coordinates: 55°40′48.91″N 12°35′24.47″E
- Construction started: 1753
- Completed: 1817

Nyhavn 31 is a listed property overlooking the Nyhavn canal in central Copenhagen, Denmark.

== History ==
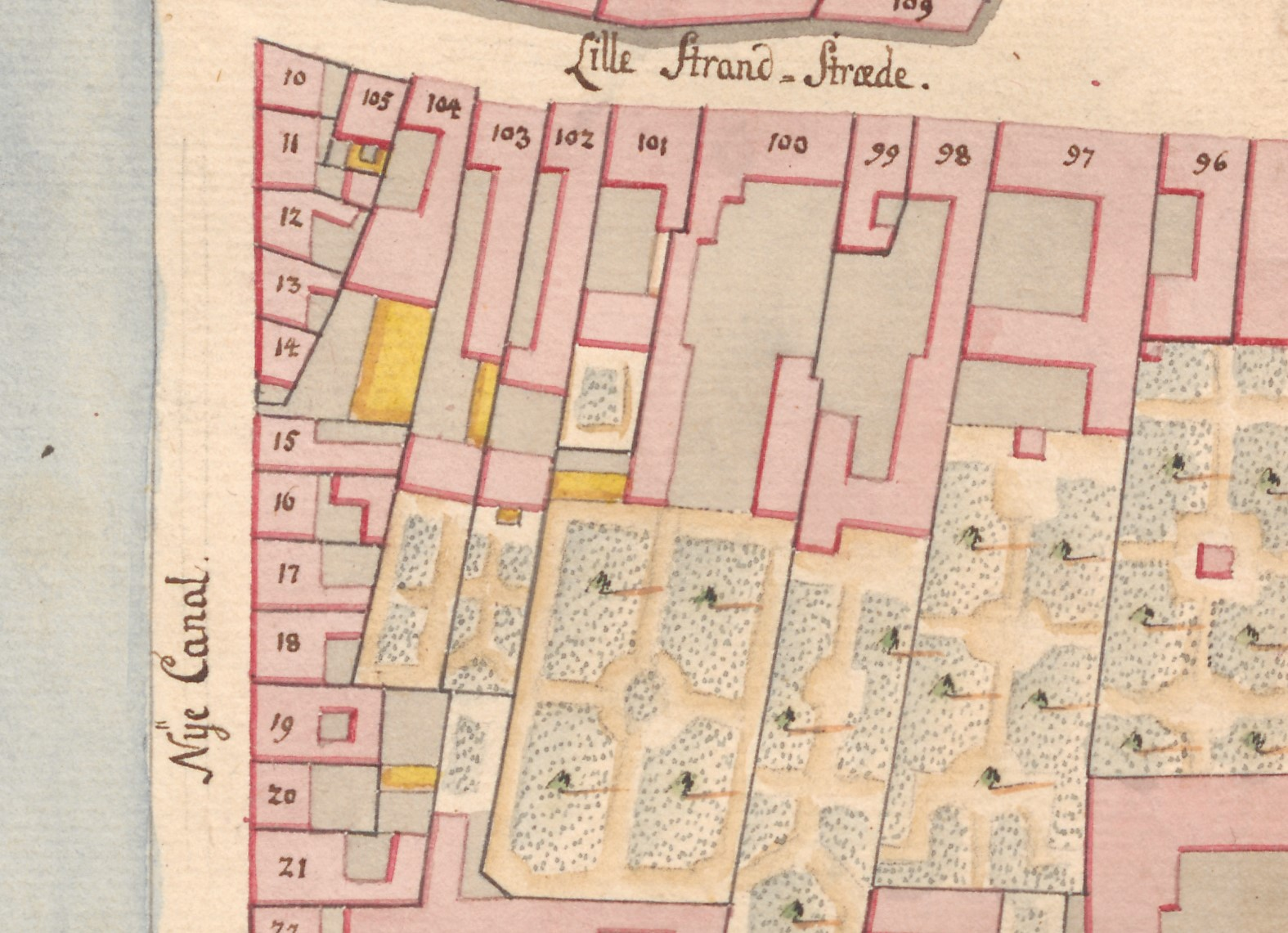
No. 16 seen in a detail from Christian Gedde's map of St. Ann's East Quarter, 1757

The property was listed in Copenhagen's first cadastre of 1689 as No. 11 in St. Ann's East Quarter. It was owned by skipper Mikkel Jensen at that time. The present building on the site was constructed with two storeys for skipper Thomas Andersen between 1691 and 1714. The property was listed in the new cadastre of 1756 as No. 16 in St. Ann's East Quarter and was owned by skipper Peder Løg at that time.

The wealthy merchant Andreas Bodenhoff acquired the property in 1770 and lived there until his death in 1794. At the time of the 1787 census, he lived there with his son Andreas, his daughter Giertrud, the clerks Conrath Ditlew Hopman (fuldmægtig) and Christian Lund (skriverkarl), three caretakers and two maids.

=== Edward Gram ===
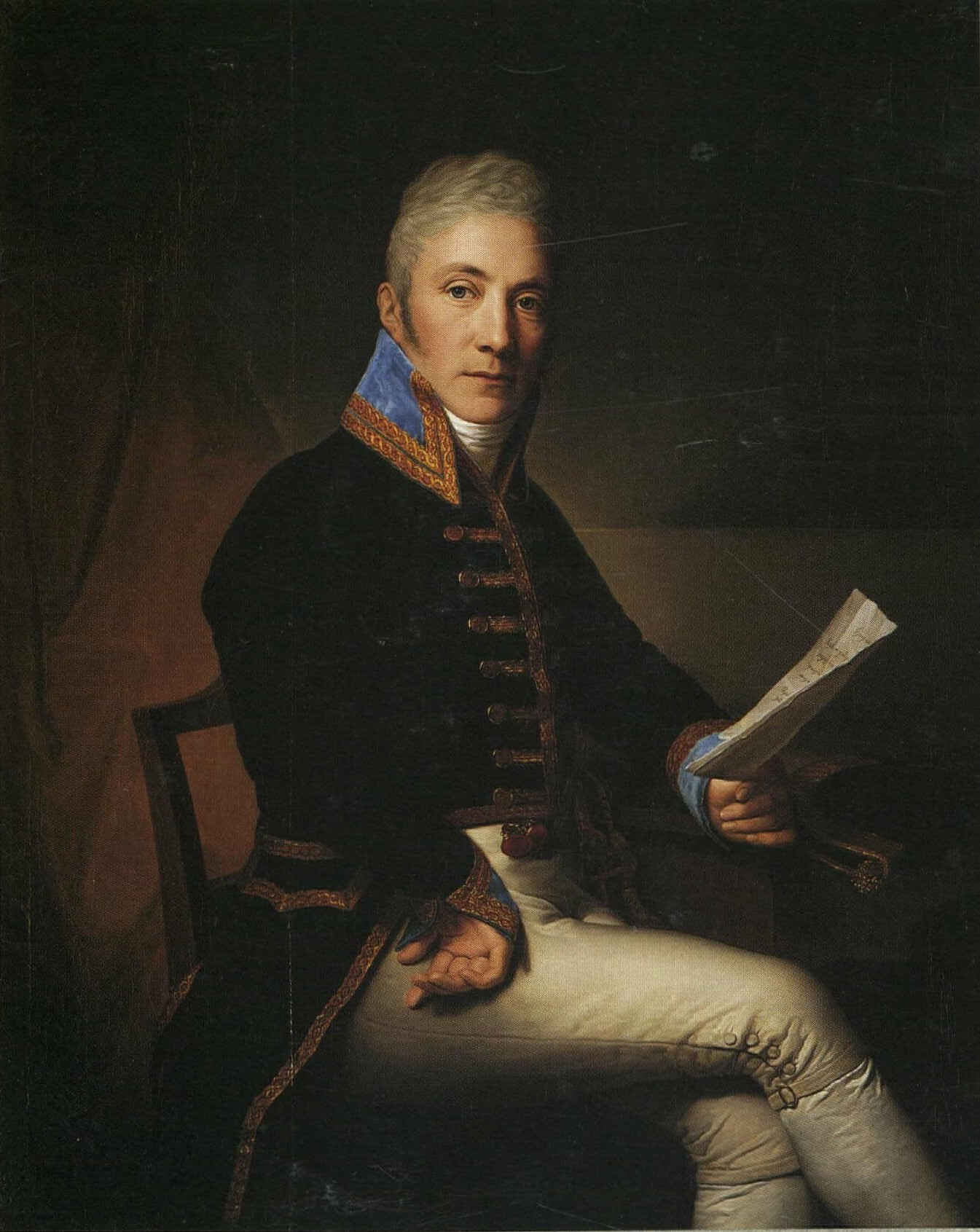
Eduard Gram (1769-1858)

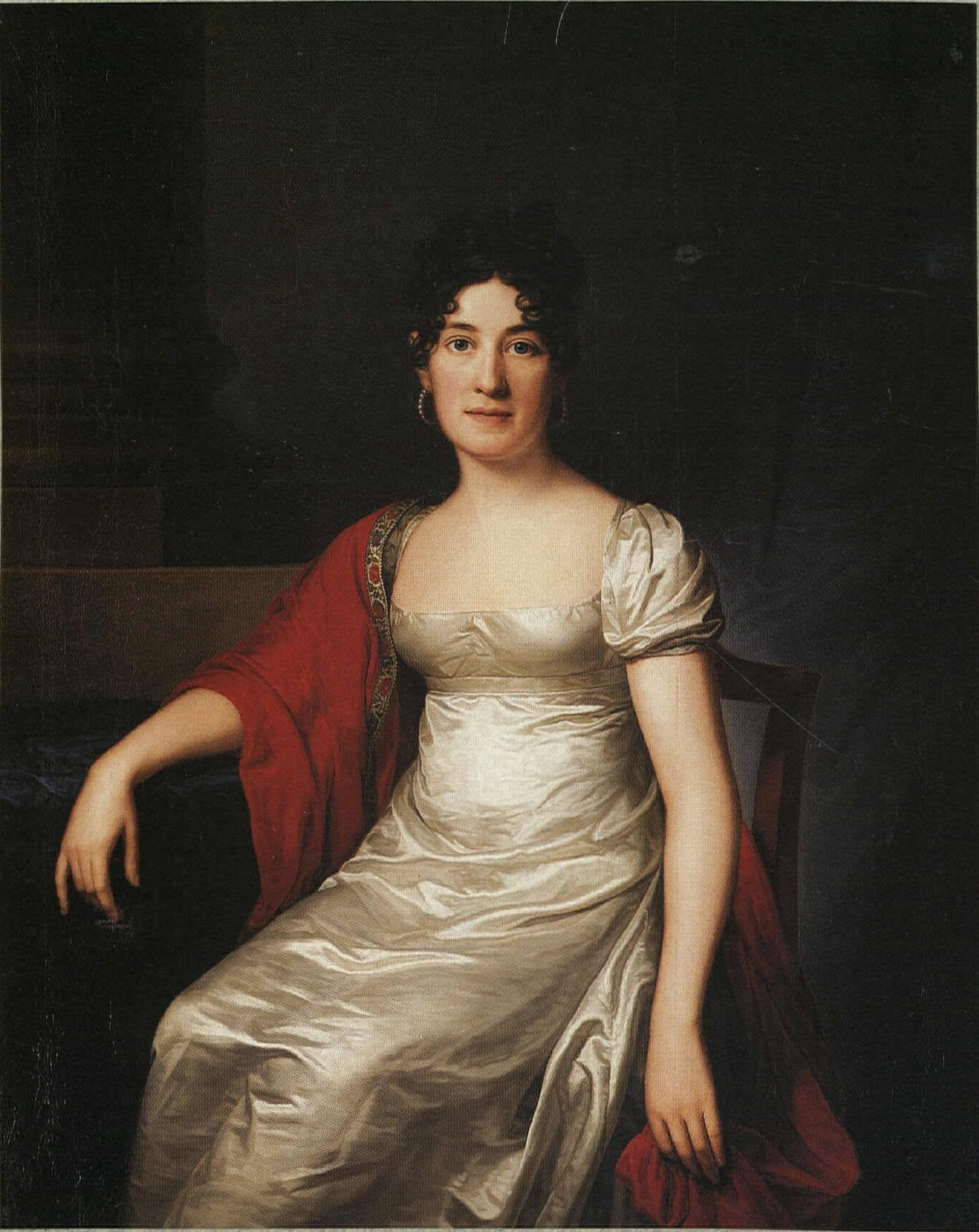
Christiane Gram, f. Bech

In 1799 the property was acquired by wholesaler Edvard Gram (1769-1858). He heightened the building with one floor in the same year. At the time of the 1801 census, he resided in the building with his 17-year-old wife Christiane Bech, four employees in his grocery business, a caretaker, a coachman and two maids.

In the new cadastre of 1806, the property was again listed as No. 16. It was by then still owned by Gram. Gram was appointed both as Kammerråd and Swedish consil-general.

=== Peter Christian Knudtzon ===
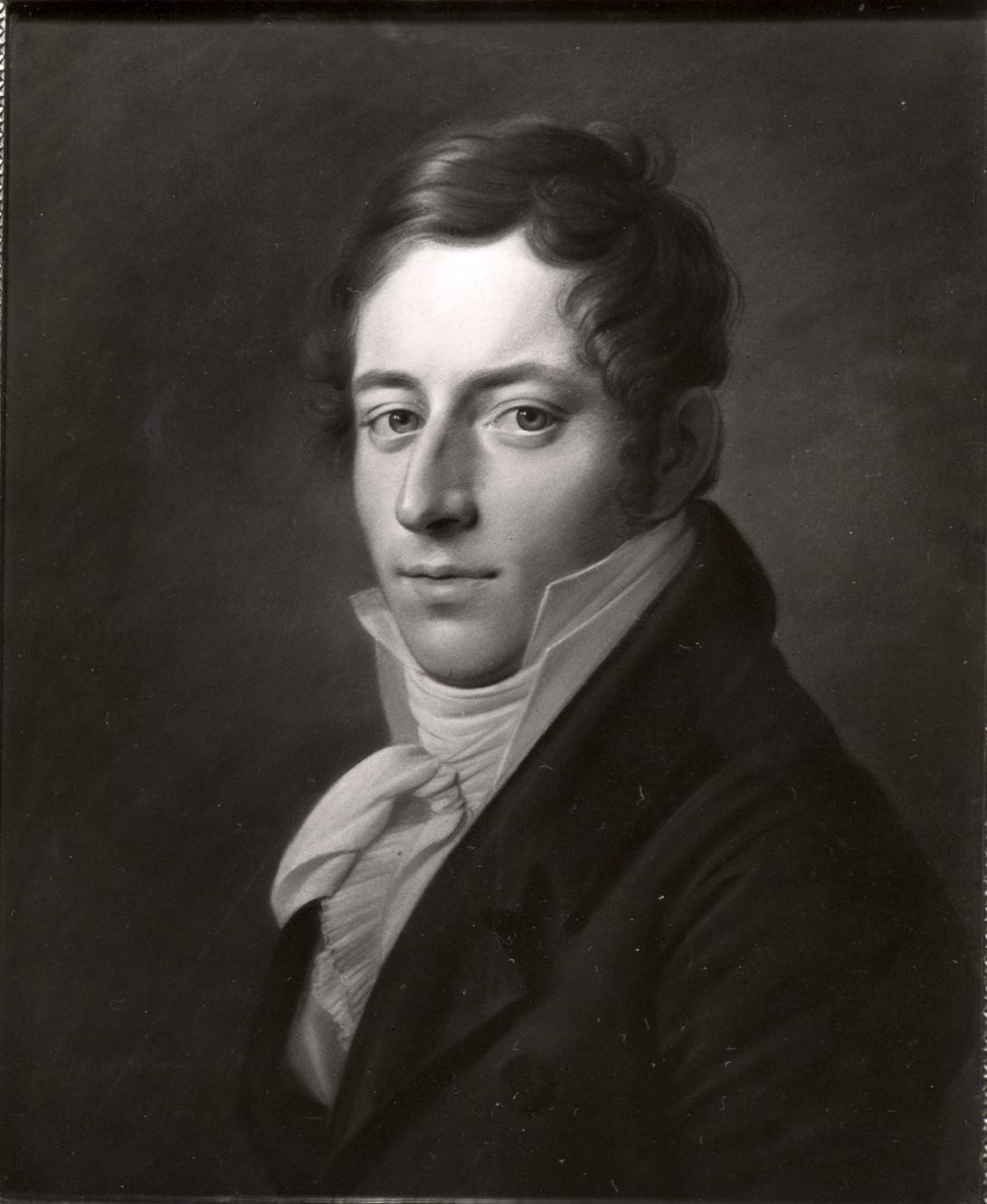
Peter Christian Knudtzon

In the early 1820s the property was acquired by the general trader (grosserer) Peter Christian Knudtzon.

The merchant Hans Puggaard and his wife Bolette, a painter, resided in the building in 1826 but moved to Nyhavn 42 the following year. They socialized with many of the leading artists of the day. Their daughter Maria, who was only three years old at the time, would later marry the politician Orla Lehmann. Søren Henrik Petersen (1788–1860), a printmaker, was for a while also among the residents.

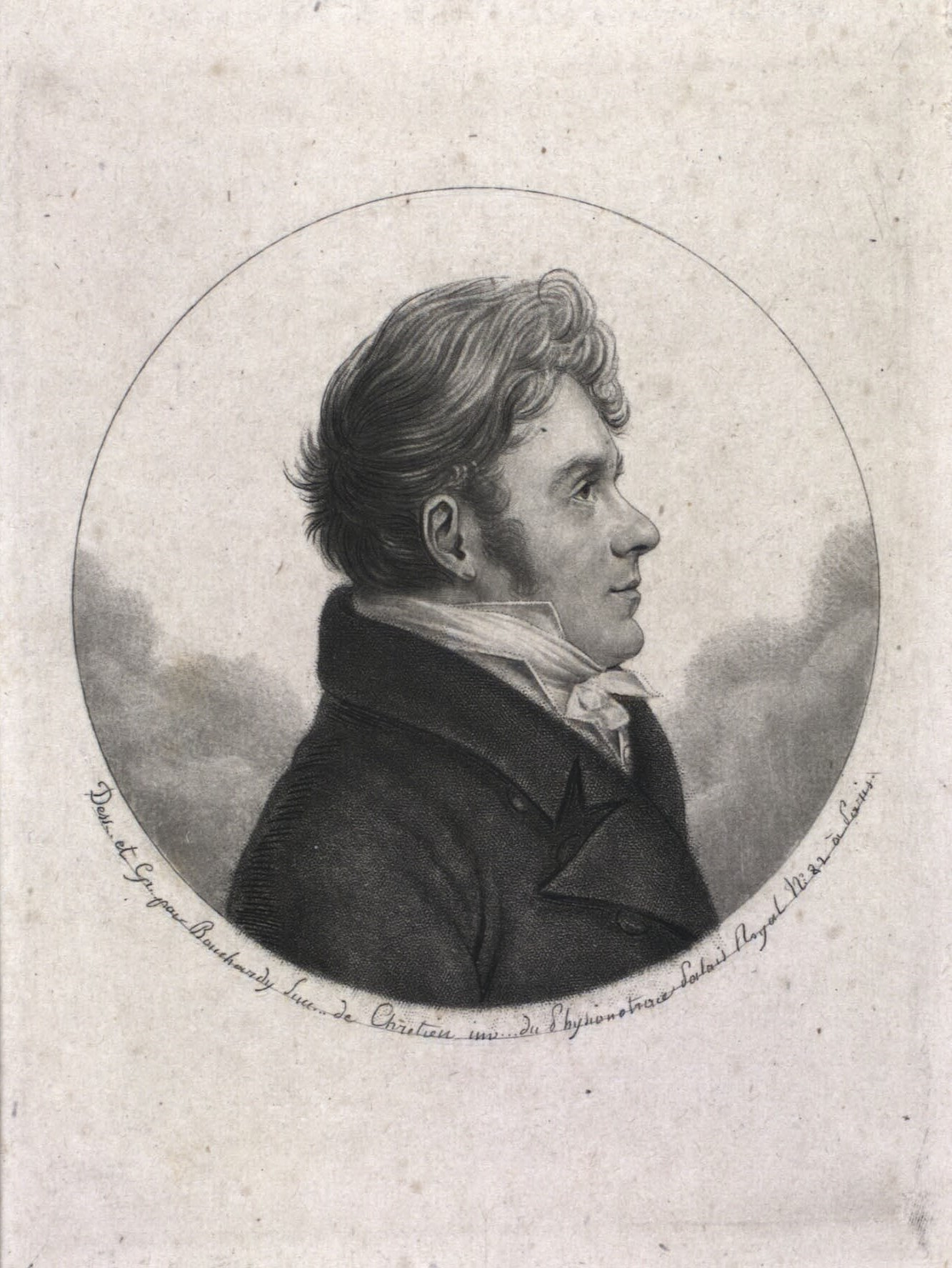
Jean Antoine Henri Garrigues

One of the apartments was for a while let out to the French-German businessman Jean Antoinne Henri Garrigues (1782-1746). He had moved to Copenhagen in 1817, where he was involved in the short-lived Baltic Trading Company. In 1822, he was appointed Portuguese Consul-General in Copenhagen. In 1828, he was also appointed as Brazilian Vice Consul. He traded under the name J. A. H. Garrigues. In 1832, he bought the house at Pustervig No. 196 (now Hauser Plads 10).

Knudtzon's property was home to 11 residents in two households at the 1834 census. Peter Christian Knudtzon resided on the second floor with his son Jess Nicolaj Knudtzen (then in Spain) and one maid. Niels Høeg Husted (c. 1793-1835), another wholesaler (grosserer), resided on the first floor with his wife Rosaline Sophie Husted, three employees in his wholesale business, one male servant and two maids. Rosaline Sophie Husted was in her first marriage the mother of the opera singer Ida Wulff. In 1831, she had married the military officer and later postmaster Ernst Frederik von Holstein.

The property was home to 14 residents in three households at the 1840 census. W. Holtmann, a senior clerk, resided on the ground floor with grocer Chr. Anton Jørgensen, grocer Hans Christian Huus and one maid. Peter Christian Knudtzon was now residing on the first floor with his wife L. Knudtzon, one male servant and one maid. Peter Severin Giessing, a broker (mægler; a son of pastor Rasmus Jørgen Giessing in Bogense), resided on the second floor with his wife Cathrine C. Giessing, his son Søren Sommer Giessing, his niece Sophie Gotlibsen and one maid. Back in 1834, Giessing and his wife had lived at Nyhavn 17.

Knudtzon went bankrupt in the early 1840s. He therefore had to sell the property. A few years later, with capital from his brothers in Norway, he was able to construct the corner building at Nyhavn 47. His son Frederik Gotschalk Knudtzon (1843-1917) mentions the building in his memoirs.

The Knutson family had not yet moved at the 1845 census. Knutson and his wife lived on the first floor with their two children (aged two and four), one male servant and three maids. Morten Johansen, a grocer (urtekræmmer) resided on the ground floor with his wife Wilhelmine Johansen, their five children (aged one to nine), a grocer (employee), an apprentice, a male servant and two maids. Peter Severin Giessing and his wife resided on the second floor with his nephews Georg and Peter Holger Giessing (students; sons of Johan Georg Giessing in Thorkilstrup), his sister Jacobine Giessing (listed as a husjomfru) and two maids.

=== 1850 census ===
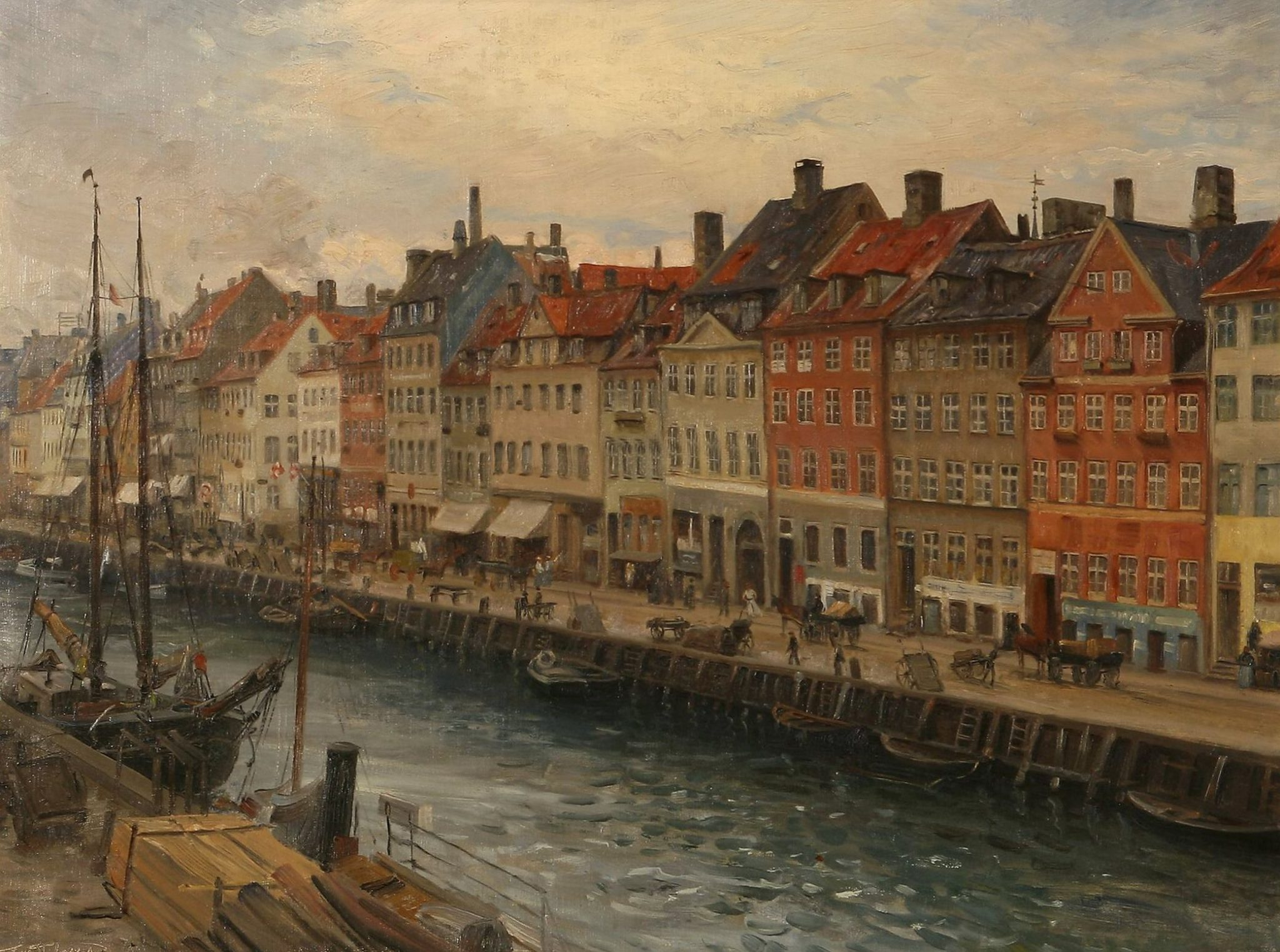
Nyhavn, painted by Tom-Petersen

The property was home to 35 residents in four households at the 1850 census. Christian von Lövenfeldt (1803-1866), a kammerjunker and captain in the 1st Livjæger Corps, resided on the ground floor with his wife Camilla Adellaide (née Glahn), their three children (aged three to 11), one male servant and two maids. Isaac Salemonsen, a textile manufacturer, resided on the first floor with his wife Hannshen Salomsen, their eight children (aged nine to 20), the widow Amalie Salomonsen, the visitor Henriette Salemonsen, a governess and two maids. P. S. Giessing, who now worked as a painter, resided on the second floor with his wife, office clerk Thedor Blankenstein, one male servant and one maid. Seyer M. Jürgensen, a skipper, resided in the basement with his wife Christiane Frederikke (née Bede), their two children (aged two and four), two maids and one lodger.

Hans Georg Worm's wholesale company H.G. Worm & Co. was from its foundation in 1865 based on the second floor of the rear wing. The company was responsible for distributing match boxes from Jönköping Tändstickfabrik in Sweden. By 1875, H. C. Worm & Co. sold a total of 9.7 million match boxes, many of which were exported to North and South America. Thorvald Giessing operated another wholesale company from the No. 31 in the years 1877–1918. Christian Gelert's wholesale business was from 1888 to 1901 based in the building.

=== 20th century ===
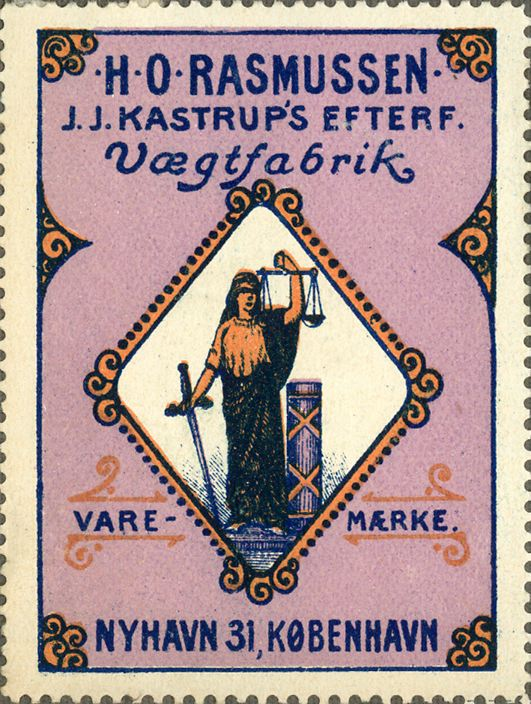
O. Rasmussen, J. Kastrup's successor, a manufacturer of weights

A/S Oscar Frønckel & Co.'s Bogtrykkeri, a book printing business founded at Store Kongensgade 81 in 1916, was from 1918 based in larger premises at Nyhavn 31.

The Victrix bicycle manufacturer was established on the site in 1919. Some 1,600,000 bicycles were manufactured in one of the rear wings.

The building was listed by the Danish Heritage Agency in the Danish national registry of protected buildings in 1945. It was restored by the architect Alfred Homann in 1981. The building has both housed the Royal Danish Theatre's administration while the building on Kongens Nytorv was refurbished and the Danish Library Agency. In 2010–11, CFP Groupe purchased the building and converted it into apartments.

== Architecture ==
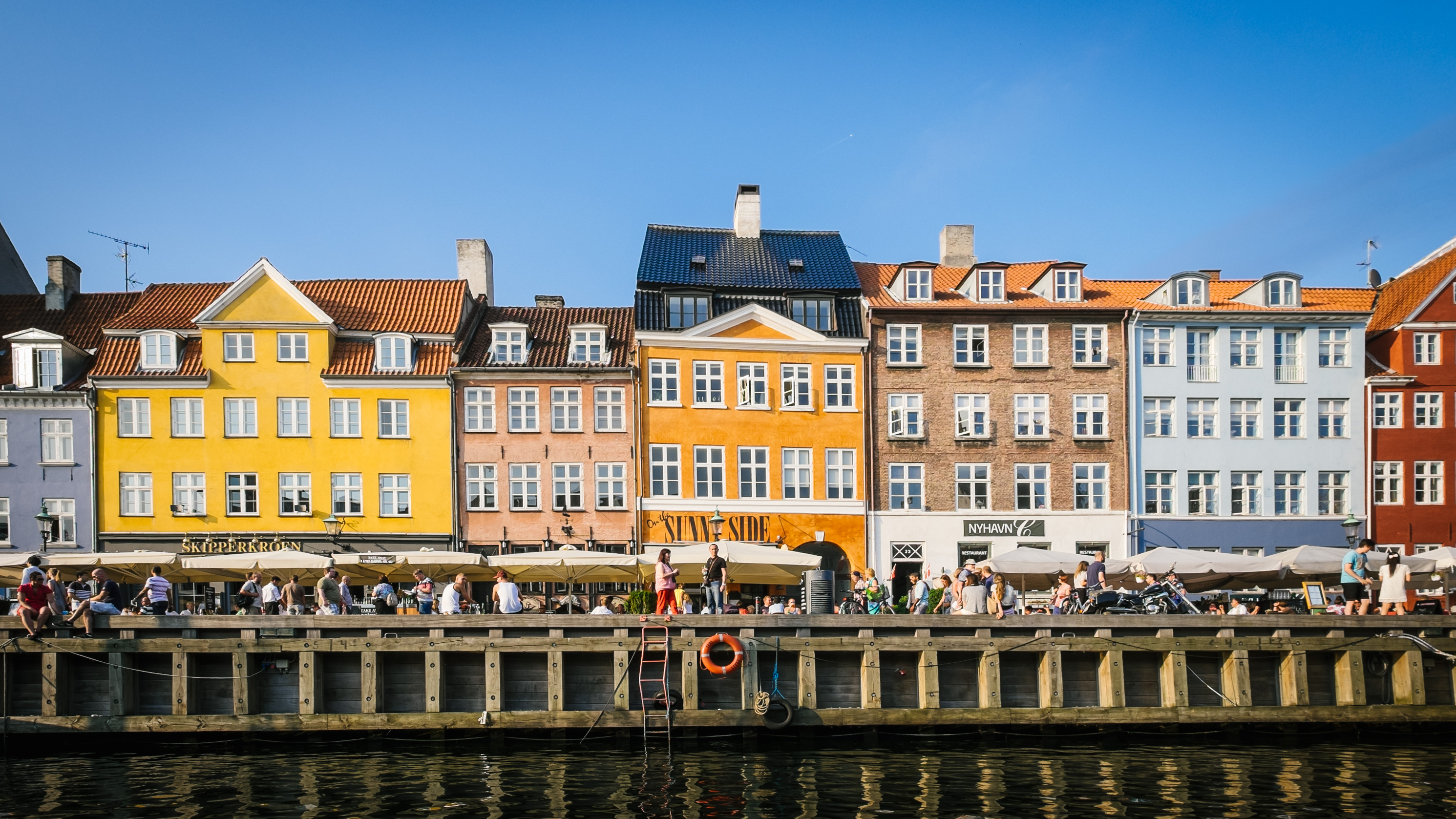
Nyhavn 31 in the middle of the house row

The building is five bays wide. Two consecutive rear wings extend from the rear side of the building. The first is from circa 1800 while the one to the rear is from the first half of the 18th century.

== Today ==
The building is now home to an Italian restaurant.
