= Stiftsprovstsboligen =

Listed building in Copenhagen

Stiftprovsteboligen
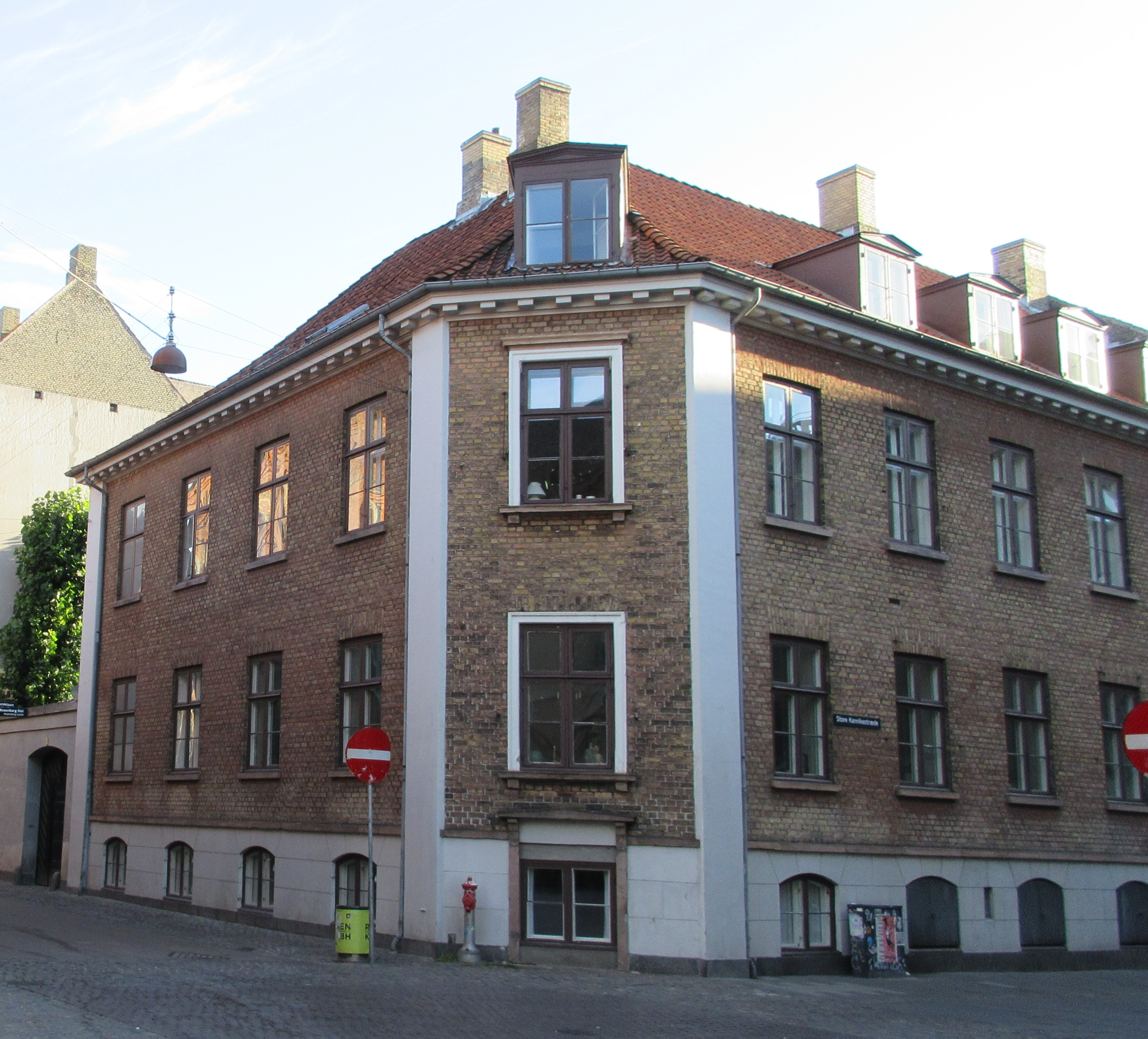
- Interactive map of the Stiftprovsteboligen area

General information
- Architectural style: Neoclassical
- Location: Copenhagen, Denmark
- Coordinates: 55°40′48.29″N 12°34′24.42″E
- Completed: 1811

Design and construction
- Architect: Niels Schønberg Kurtzhals

Stiftprovsteboligen, situated at the corner of Fiolstræde (No. 8) and Store Kannikestræde, opposite the Church of Our Lady, is the official residence of the provost (domprovst) of the Provostry of Our Lady–Vesterbro. The domprovst (formerly stiftsprovst) of the Provostry of Our Lady–Vesterbro is the most senior of the provosts of the Diocese of Copenhagen. The administrative office of the provostry is in the basement of the building. The Neoclassical building from 1840–41 was listed in the Danish registry of protected buildings and places in 1939. A plaque on the garden wall towards Fiolstræde commemorates that Ludvig Holberg resided in an earlier building on the site from June 1740 until his death in January 1754.

== History ==
=== The Professor's House ===
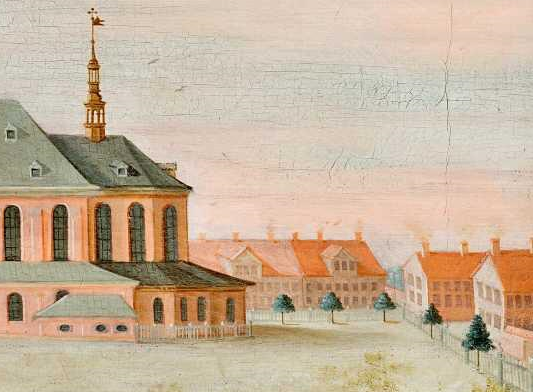
Ludvig Holberg's residence in Fiolstræde

At the time of Copenhagen's first cadastre of 1689 the site was made up of a number of small properties. They were later merged into a single large property owned by the University of Copenhagen. The property served as the official residence of Ludvig Holberg from 21 June 1740 until his death on 28 January 1754. The property was listed as No. 41 in Klædebo Quarter in the new cadastre of 1756.

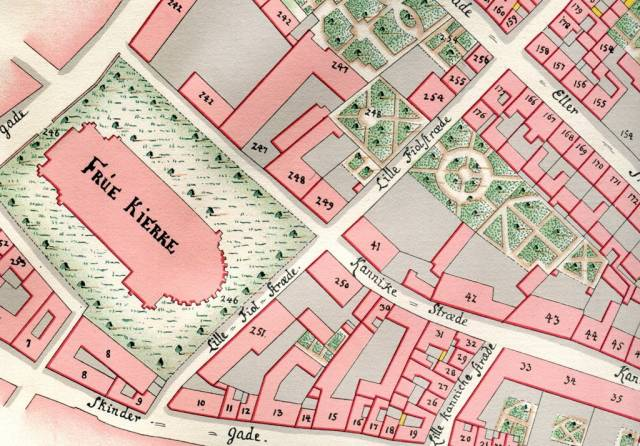
No. 41 seen on Christian Gedde's map of Klædebo Quarter, 1757

The property was later put at the disposal of Hector Janson, a professor of theology, who also served as the university's rector in 1775–76 and again in 1784–85. He resided in the building with his wife Anne Marie Siendrup, one male servant and two maids at the time of the 1787 census.

The house was later put at the disposal of Claus F. Hornemann, another professor of theology. He resided in the building with his wife Helena Elisabeth Crane, their eight children (aged seven to 22), a caretaker, two male servants and three maids at the time of the 1801 census.

The property was listed as No. 197 in the new cadastre of 1806. The building was completely destroyed during the British bombardment of Copenhagen in 1807.

=== The Provost's House ===
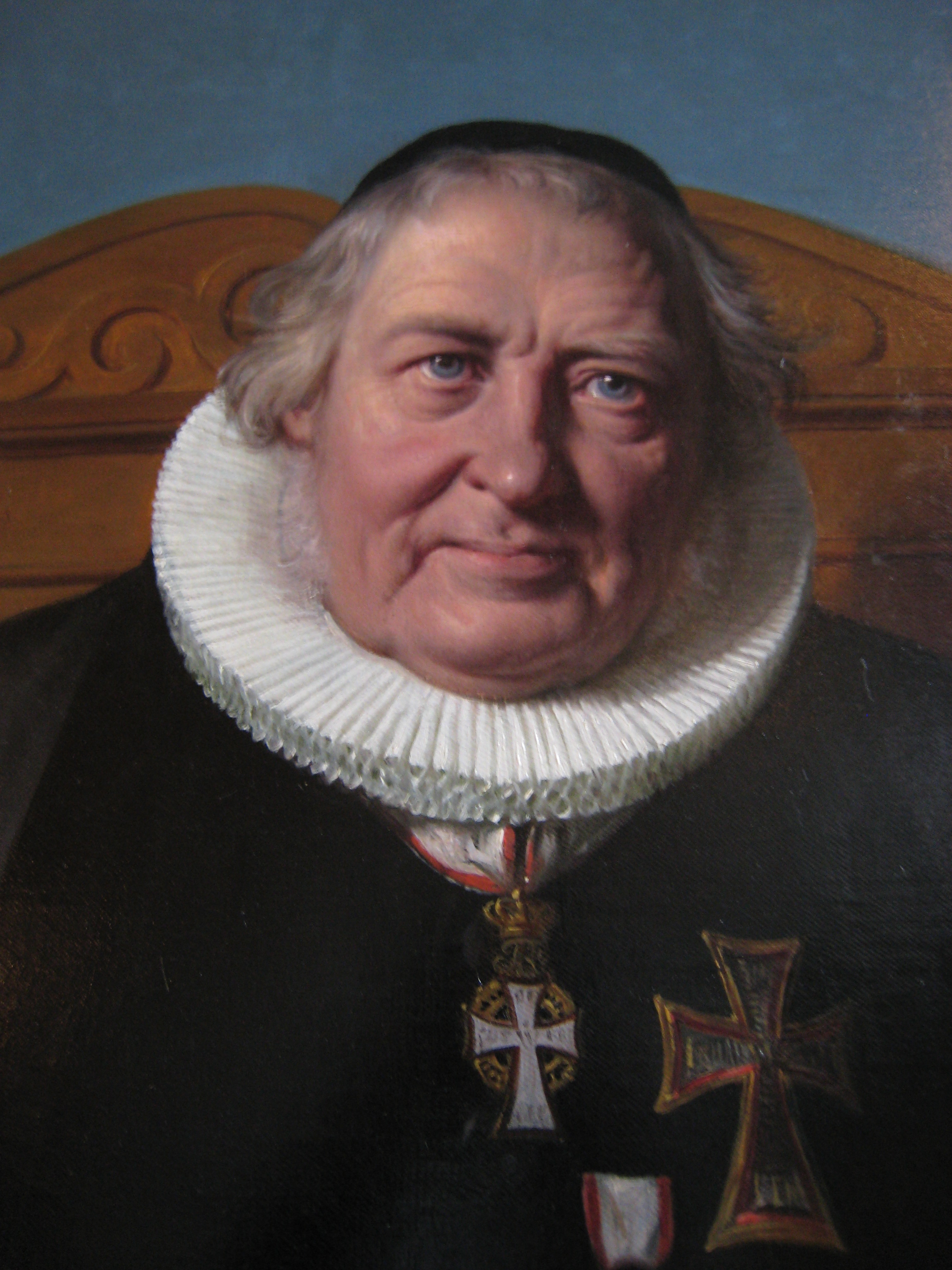
Eggert Christopher Tryde painted by Vilhelm Marstrand in 1959.

In 1833, No. 197 was divided into three smaller properties. No. 197 A & B were sold to the Church of Our Lady. The present building on the site was constructed in 1840–41 as a new home for the stiftsprovst at the church. In 1945, No. 197 was sold off and later used for the construction of what is now Store Kannikestræde 18 (1867). No. 197 C was sold to master carpenter Mads Schifter Holm and used for the construction of what is now Fiolstræde 12–14 (1837–1839).

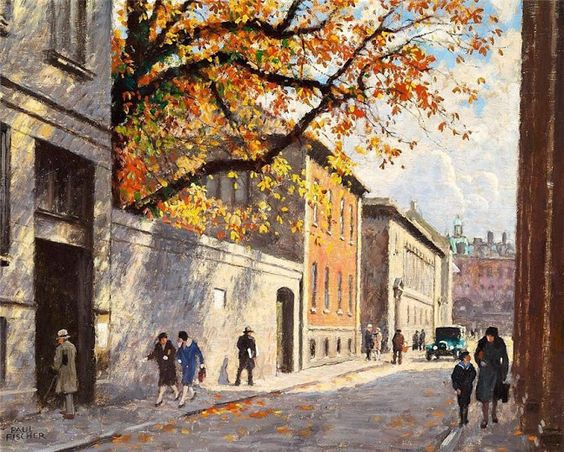
The building seen on a painting by Poul Gustav Fischer.

The first stiftsprovst to reside in the new building was parish priest at the Church of Our Lady Eggert Christopher Tryde (1781–1860). The building was home to three households at the 1845 census. Trude resided in the building with his daughter Frederikke Trylle, his foster daughter Marie Letteland, his housekeeper Sille Beyer, one male servant, and two maids. Hartvig Møller, a concierge, resided in the building with his wife Marie Møller and their seven children (aged three to 17). Peter Petersen, a 46-year-old man, resided in the building with his wife Chathrine Petersen and their children (aged 11 to 18).

The property was home to 17 residents at the 1860 census.

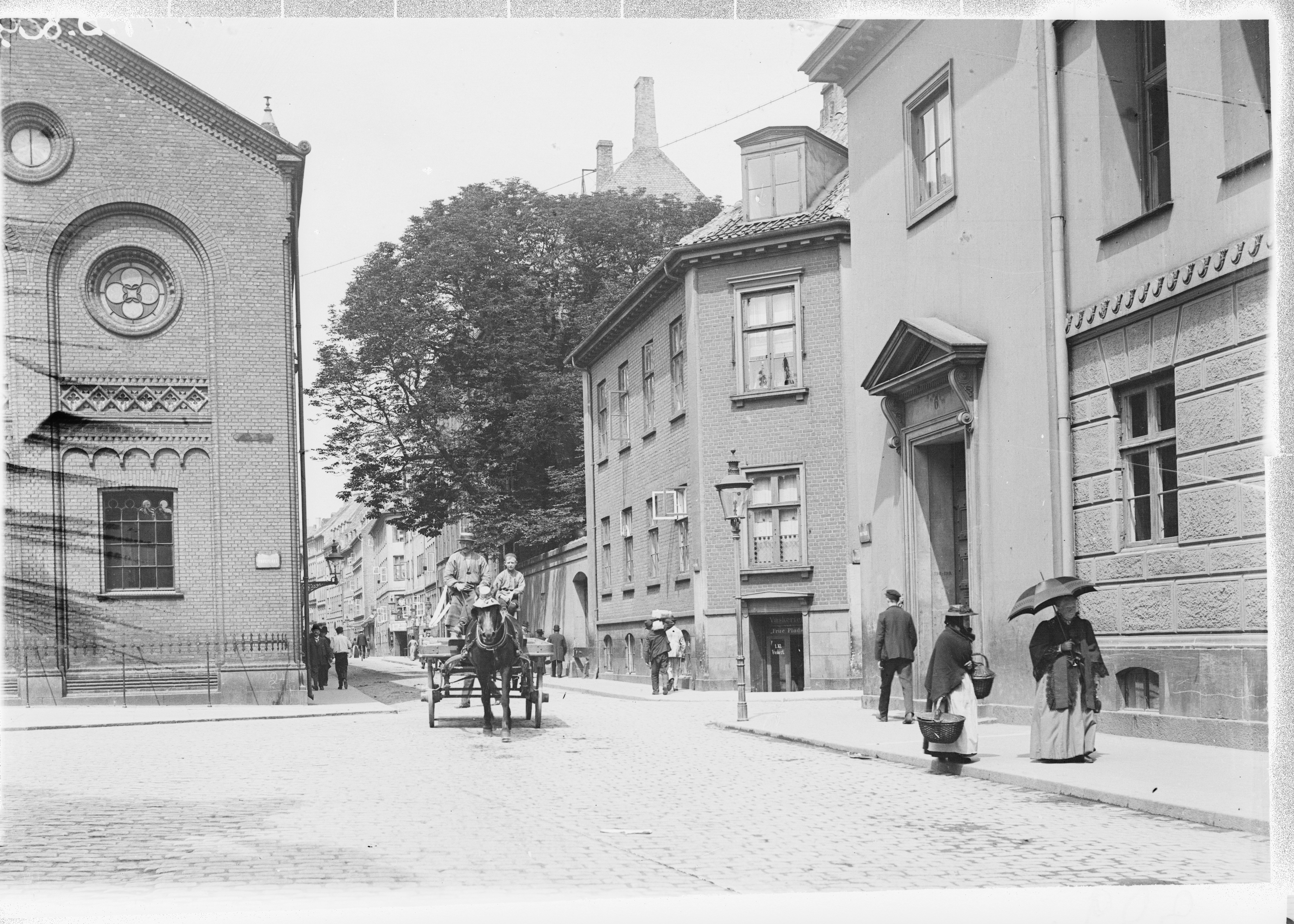
The building seen on a photo by Fritz Theodor Benzen, 1903.

Hans Fuglsang-Damgaard (1890–1979) resided in the building as stiftsprovst in the early 1930s. In 1934, he was appointed as Bishop of Copenhagen. He therefore moved into the Bishop's House in Nørregade. He was succeeded as stiftsprovstby Paul Brodersen.

== Architecture ==
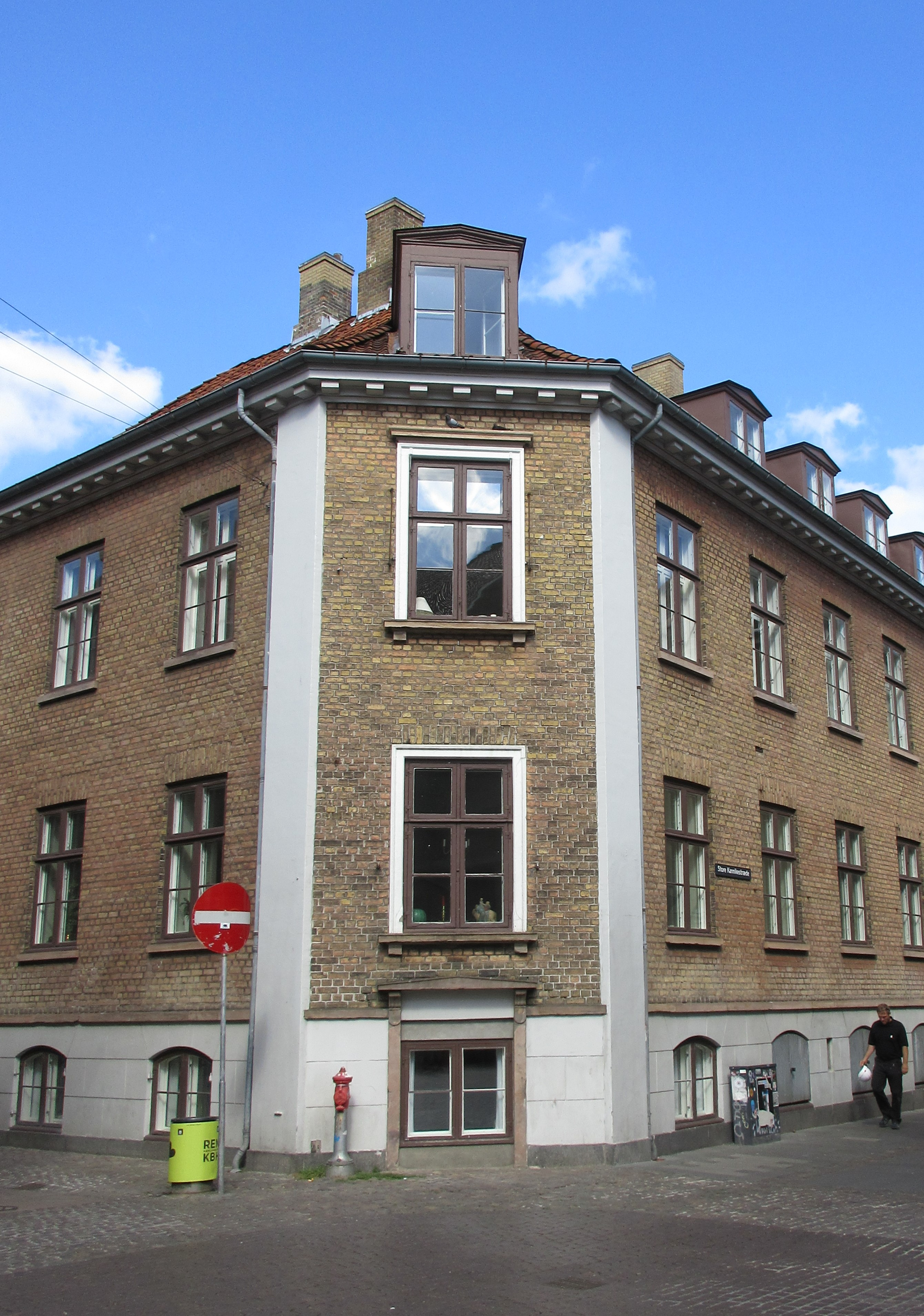
The building in 2021.

The L-shaped corner building is constructed in yellow brick on a plinth of granite ashlars with two storeys over a walk-out basement. It has a four bays long facade on Fiolstræde, a six bays long facade on Store Kannikestræde and a chamfered corner. The plastered upper part of the basement is finished with shadow joints and painted white. The upper part of the facade is finished with white-painted pilasters at the corners, white, painted framing around the corner windows and a white-painted dentillated cornice. All the windows have sandstone sills supported by corbels. The pitched red tile roof is pierced by four chimneys. The washed rear side of the building is painted grey. The main entrance is located in the northern gable.

== Today ==
The building serves as the official residence of the dean (domprocst) of the Provostry of Our Lady's–Vesterbro (Vor Frue–Vesterbro Provsti). The administrative office of the provosty is located in the basement of the building. The current dean is Anders Borre Gadegaard (2022).

== See also ==
- Store Kannikestræde 8
