= Store Kannikestræde 8 =

Historic building in Copenhagen, Denmark

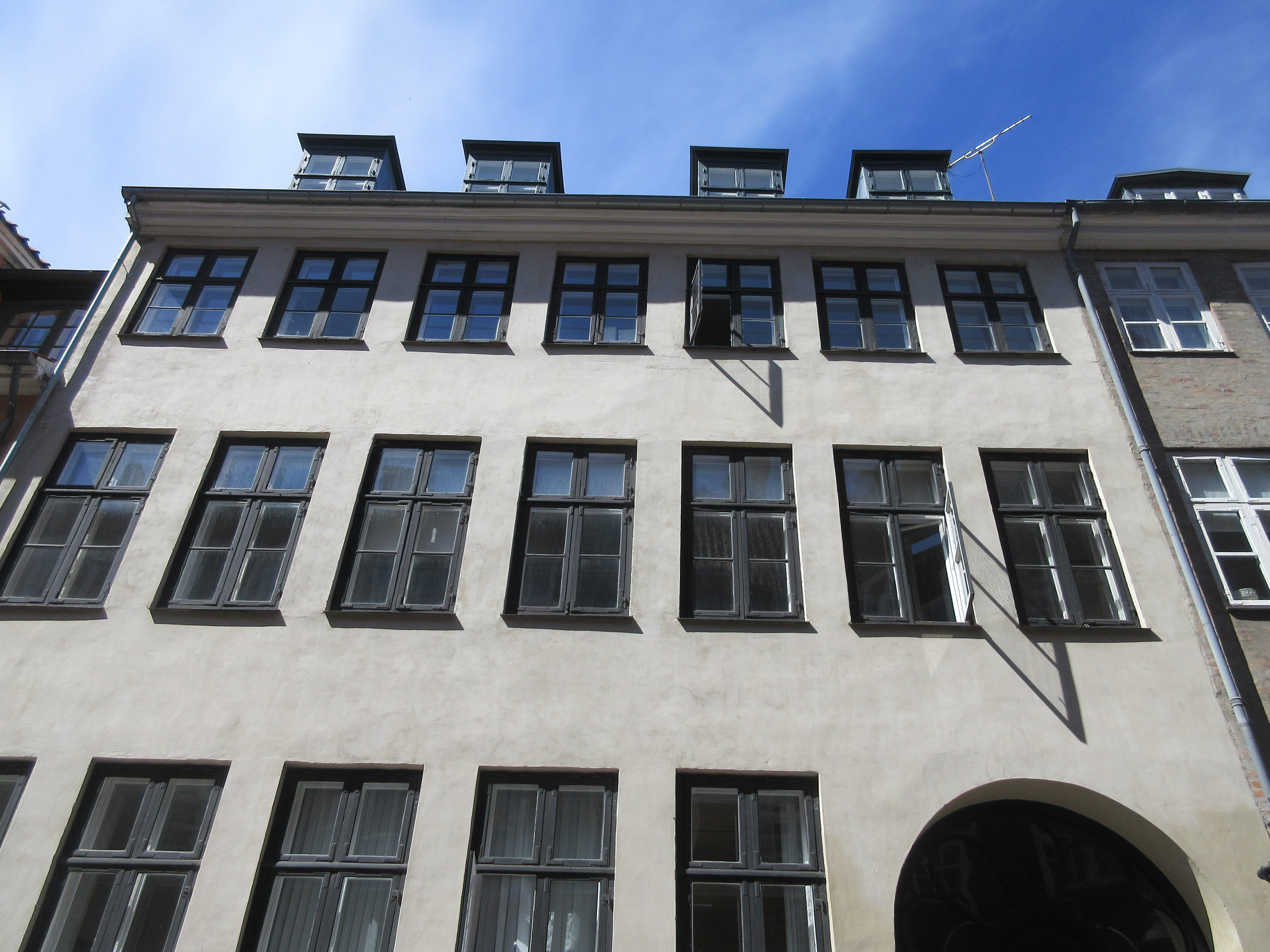
- Interactive map of the Store Kannikestræde 8 area

General information
- Location: Copenhagen, Denmark
- Coordinates: 55°40′50.45″N 12°34′29.32″E
- Completed: 1730s

Store Kannikestræde 8 is a historic building in the Old Town of Copenhagen, Denmark. It was listed on the Danish registry of protected buildings and places in 1945. It has been in use as the parish house of Trinitatis Parish since 1890. Notable former residents include the historian Rasmus Nyerupm illustrator Peter Christian Klæstrup and the architect and urban planner Conrad Seidelin.

== History ==
=== 17th and 18th centuries ===
Vice Chancellor Holger Vind owned a large property on the site in the second half of the 17th century. The property was listed in Copenhagen's first cadastre of 1689 as No. 43 in Klædebo Quarter and was owned by Vind's widow at that time. The buildings were later destroyed in the Copenhagen Fire of 1728.

The present building on the site is one of three two-storey buildings which were built at No. 6–10 for studiosus Sebastian Lier in the 1730s. The roof featured a five-bay wall dormer.

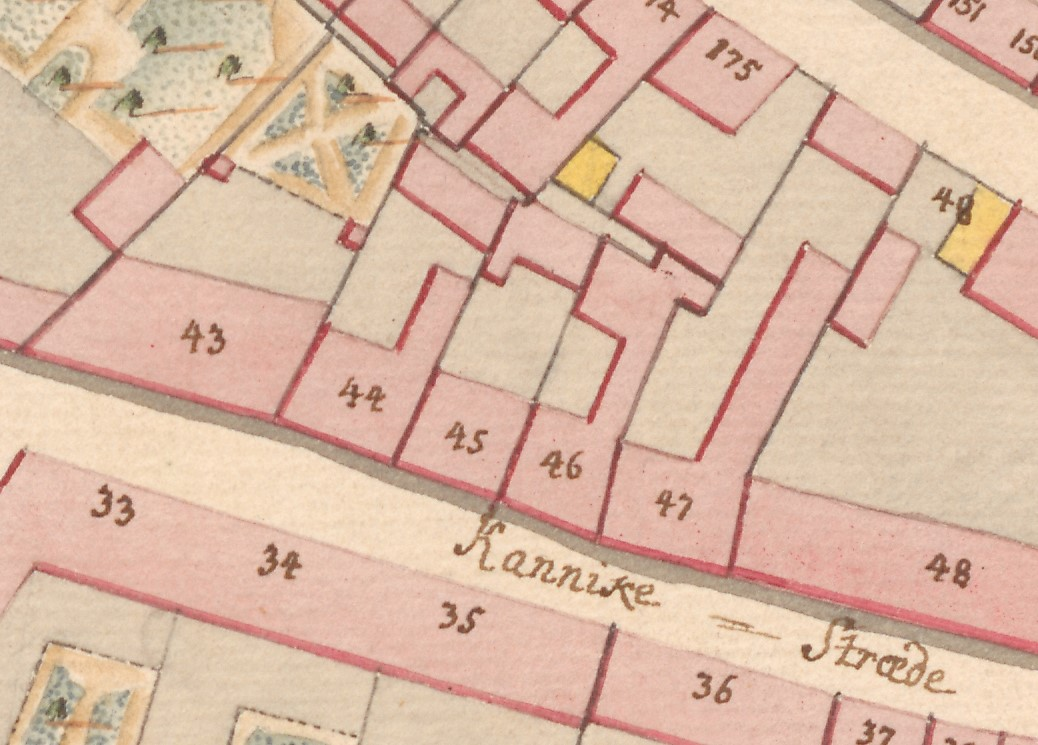
No. 45 seen in a detail from Christian Gedde's map of Klædebo Quarter, 1757

The property was later acquired by supercargo Christan Myer. His property was listed in the new cadastre of 1756 as No. 45 in Klædebo Quarter.

The property was home to 19 residents in four households at the 1787 census. Casper Willartz, a candlemaker, resided in the building with his wife Johanne, their granddaughter 22-year-old Christence and one maid. Friderich Eubceiht, an army major, resided in the building with his wife Anne Braes and two maids. Lambert Bruun, assistant pastor at Trinitatis Church, resided in the building with his wife Elisabeth Wilgaard, his sister Elisabeth Bruun, his wife's brother Carl Wilgaard, his wife's niece Anne Winde, one maid and two lodgers. Peder Møller, a shoemaker (skoflikker), resided in the building with his wife Anne Margrethe and one maid.

Rasmus Nyerup, secretary of the Royal Danish Library, was a resident in the building from 1797 to 1799.

The building was heightened with an extra floor in the 1790s. A side wing was constructed for the owner Jens Olrog at some point after 1757.

=== 19th century ===
The property was later acquired by master klein smith Peter Balthazar Brauer. His property was home to 25 residents in four households at the 1801 census. Brauer resided in the building with his wife Elisabeth Cathrine Gedike, their two children (aged 11 and 14), his brother Johan Henrich Brauer (klein smith, employee), two apprentices and a caretaker. Hans Jørgen Klemp, a teacher, resided in the building with his wife Christine Balchau, their two daughters (aged three and four), four pupils (aged 10 to 19) and two maids. Johanne Marie Weides, a 60-year-old widow, resided in the building with one maid. Jørgen Bruun Bech, a joiner, resided in the building with his wife Karen Lyde, their two children (aged one and six) and one lodger.

The property was listed in the new cadastre of 1806 as No. 46. It was owned by Brauer at that time. The illustrator Peter Christian Klæstrup (1820–1882) resided in the building around 1861.

The property was home to 21 residents in four households at the 1840 census. Sørine Liebe, an 84-year-old widow, resided on the ground floor with the widow Jacobine Müller (widow of a justitsråd), her foster daughters Charlotte Bagger and Clara Hansen and one maid. Ane Bastholm, widow of a kammerråd, resided on the first floor with the widow Christine Bast, one maid and one lodger. The second floor apartment was empty at that time. Peter Hansen, a workman, resided in the basement with his wife Marie Hammer, their three children (aged two to eight) and one maid. Diderich Behrens, a new klein smith, resided in the rear wing with his wife Blondine Dreves, another klein smith, three apprentices and one maid.

The property was home to 28 residents in four households at the 1850 census. Poul Rasmussen, a bookkeeper and treasurer, resided on the second floor with his wife Wilhelmine Vogel, their three children (aged nine to 14), his sister-in-law Christine Vogel and one maid. Marenline Petrine Krogh (née Krogh, 1814–1867), whose husband Hans Detlef Krogh (1803–1878) was in Flensburg with his work as a civil servant, resided on the first floor with their three children (aged two to 11), two maids and on lodger. Marenline Krogh's father was brewer Andreas Krogh, owner of the brewery at Nybrogade 26. Niels Sørensen, a workman, resided in the basement with his wife Ane Andersdatter, the wife's 10-year-old niece Ane Rasmusdatter, two maids, 23-year-old Marie Kroll and her two-year-old daughter Louise F. Kroll. Joham Didrich Ludvig Behrens (1782–1858), a master smith whose wife had just died, resided in the rear wing with his two-year-old daughter Hanne Louise Behrens, a wet nurse, a maid, a smith (employee) and two apprentices.

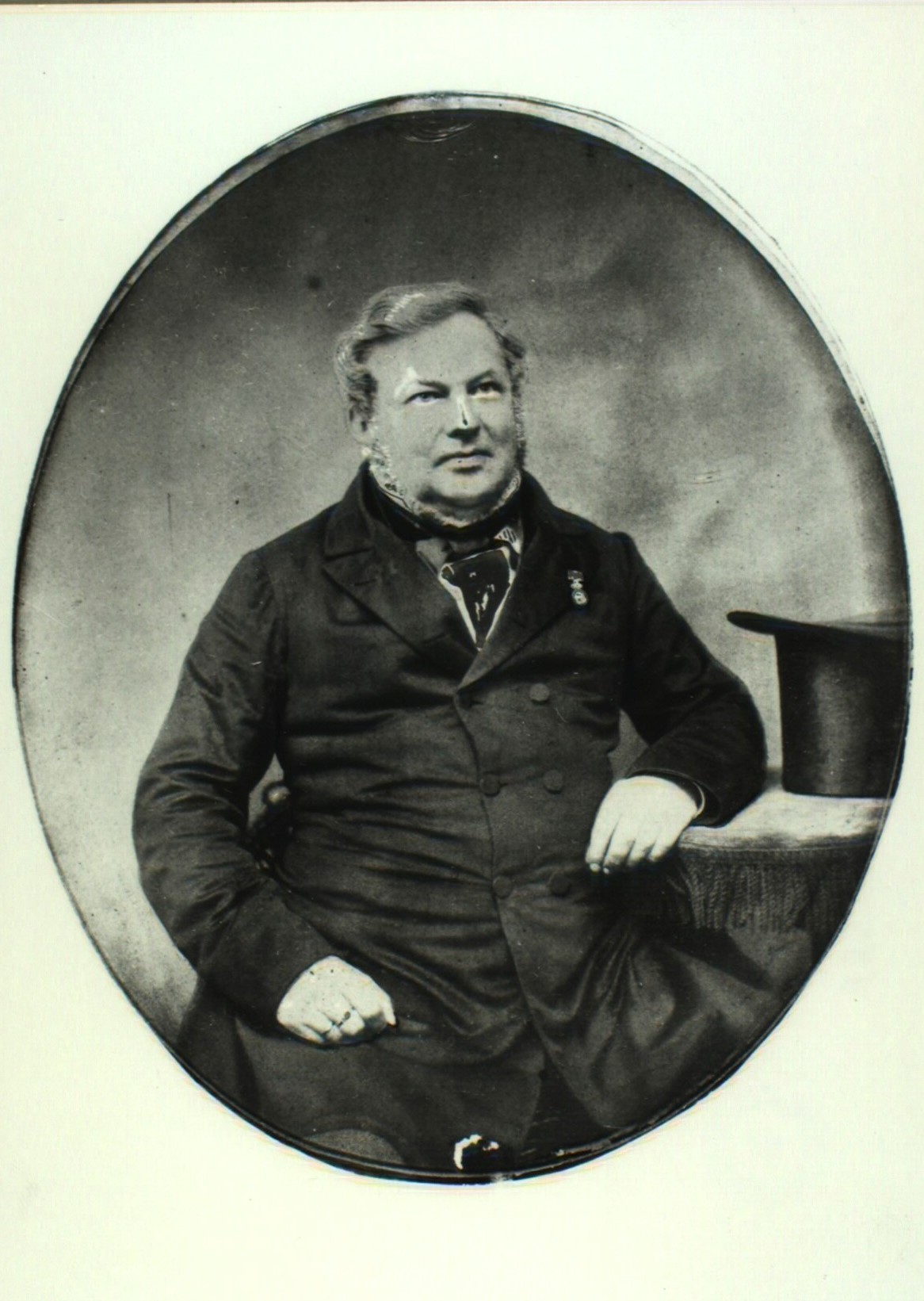
Conrad Seidelin

The property was home to 36 residents in seven households at the 1860 census. Conrad Seidelin, a master mason and later architect, resided on the first floor with his wife Emilie Sophie f. Hertmann, their four children (aged six to 17), their friend Ottilia Christiane Boiesen (teacher) and two maids. Jacob Hertz Triere, a tailor, resided on the first floor towards the courtyard with his wife Betty Triere and their four children (aged five to 16). Georg Philip Kinxi, a former restaurateur, resided on the second floor with his wife Justine Amalie Marie (née Hansen), their three children (aged 13 to 26), his sister-in-law Ida Marie Sophie Hansen and one lodger. Sophie Friers, Rachel Friers and Fylla Friers—three unmarried sisters, all of them in their 50s—resided together on the ground floor with one maid. Rasmus Olsen, a 34-year-old man, resided in the basement with his wife Ane Christensen and one maid. Hendrik Søren Andresen, a fireman, resided on the second floor of the side wing with his wife Sidsel Maagensen and their two daughters (aged one and five). Wilhelmine Anine Jacobine Behrens (née Buhr), who had become a widow, resided in the rear wing with her two youngest children (aged four and 12).

=== Trinitatis Parish House ===
The newly established congregation at Trinitatis Church purchased the building in 1893. It was subsequently used as a hub for social work in the parish. The work was organized by parish priest G. Schepelern. A daycare opened in the rear wing in 1936.

== Architecture ==
The building consists of three storeys over a high cellar and is seven bays wide. The gateway features a fanlight. A lantern is mounted on the wall to the right of the gateway.

== Gallery ==
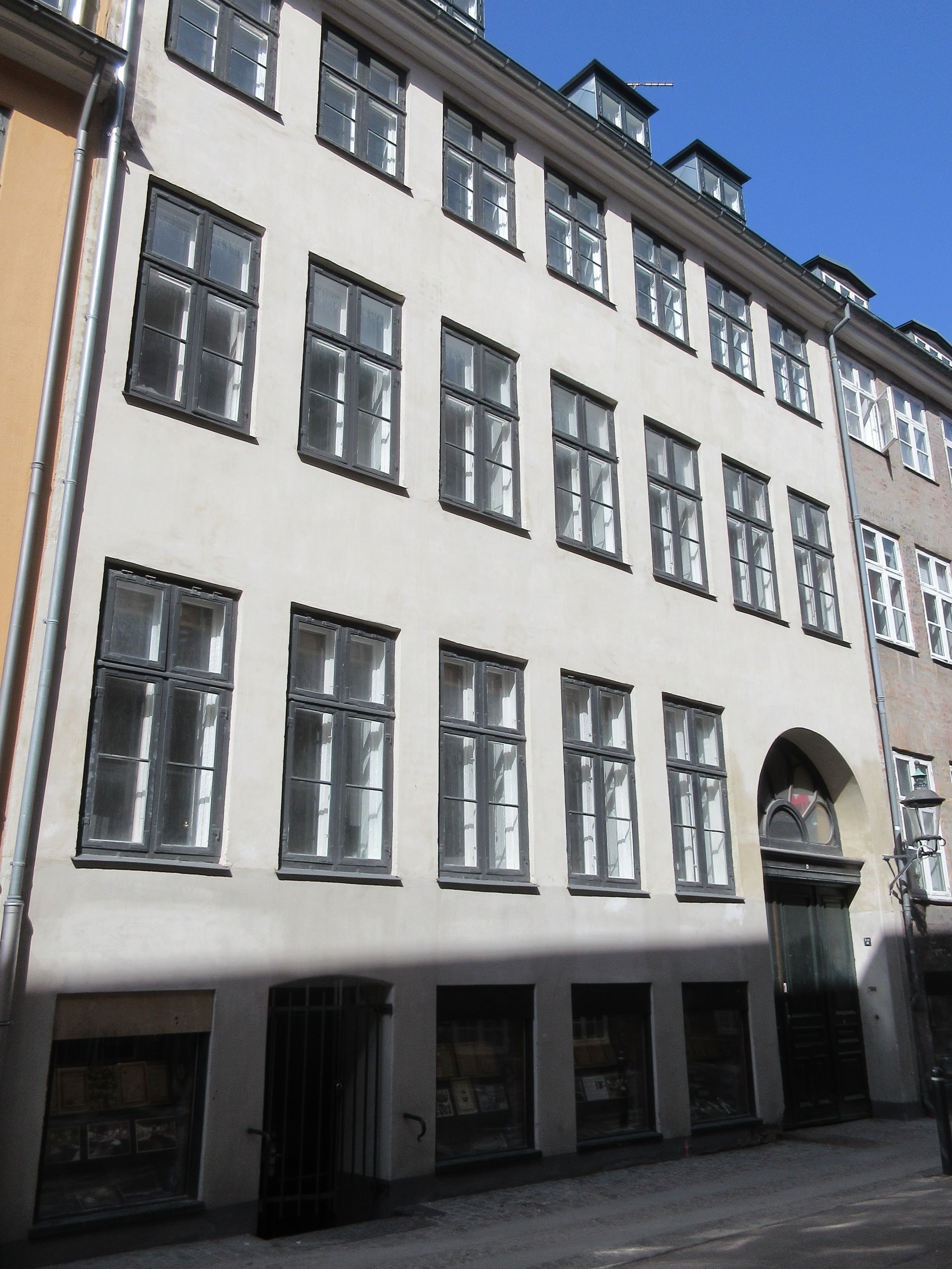

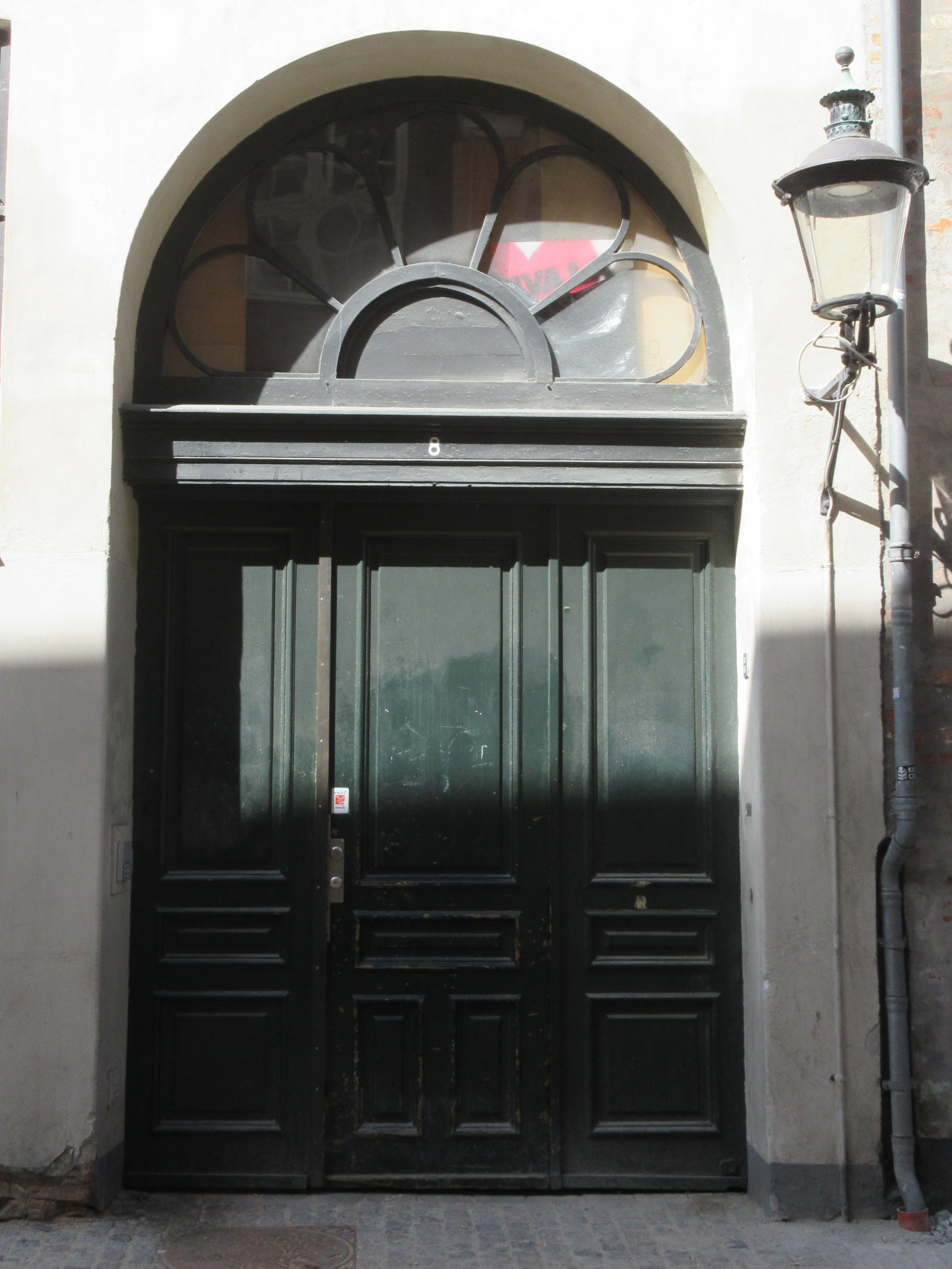
The gate
