= Nybrogade 26 =

Building in Copenhagen

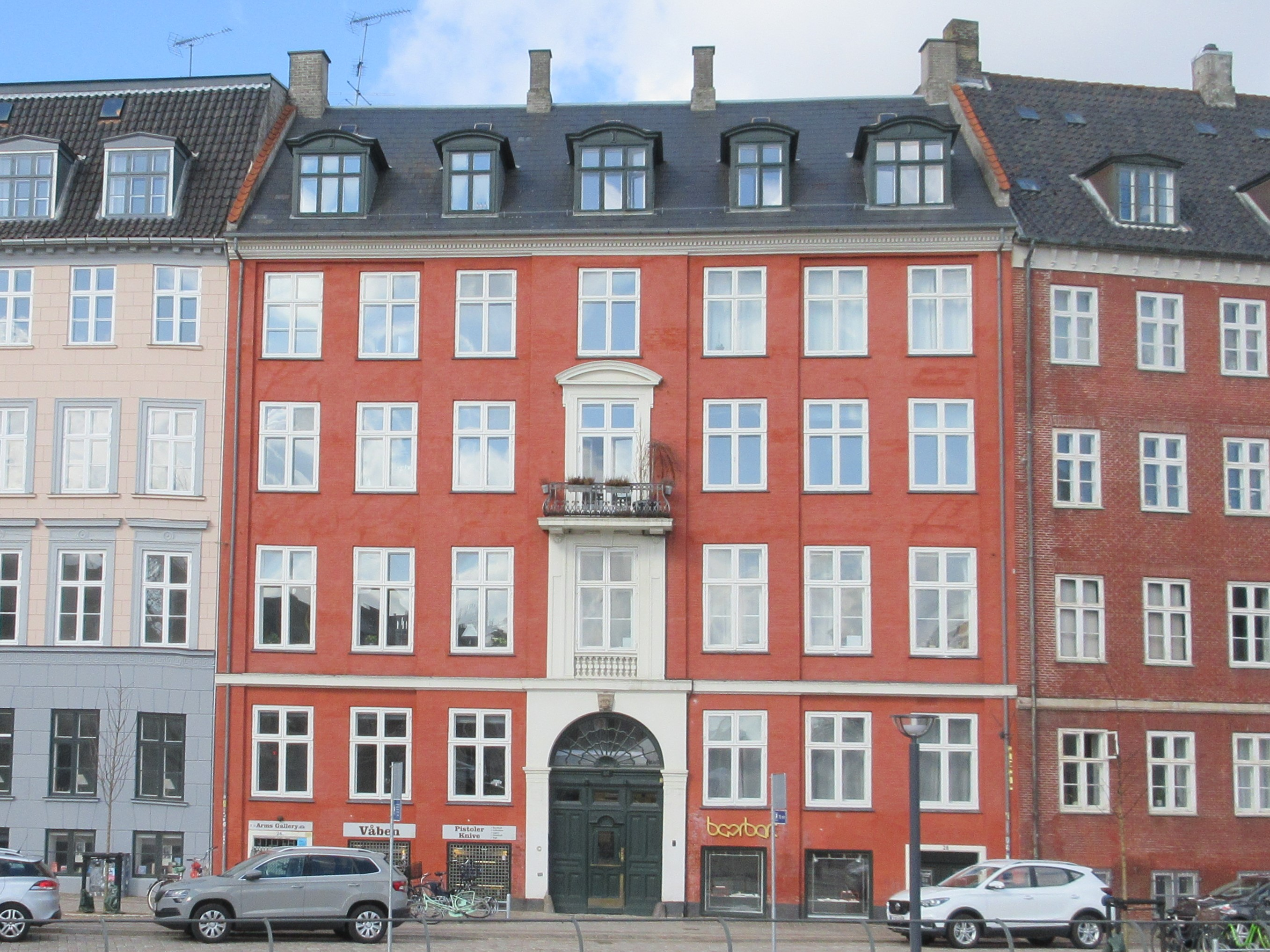
- Interactive map of the Nybrogade 26 area

General information
- Location: Copenhagen, Denmark
- Coordinates: 55°40′34″N 12°34′32.23″E
- Completed: 1928

Nybrogade 26 is a property overlooking Slotsholmen Canal in central Copenhagen, Denmark. It consists of a seven-bays-wide, four-storey residential building towards the canal and a former brewery building from the beginning of the 19th century at Magstræde 13 on the other side of the block. The entire complex was listed in the Danish registry of protected buildings and places in 1918. Notable former residents include the army officer and engineer Ernst Peymann (1737-1823). theologian Peter Rørdam (1806-1883) and mathematician and politician Adolph Steen (1816-1886).

== History ==
=== Early history ===
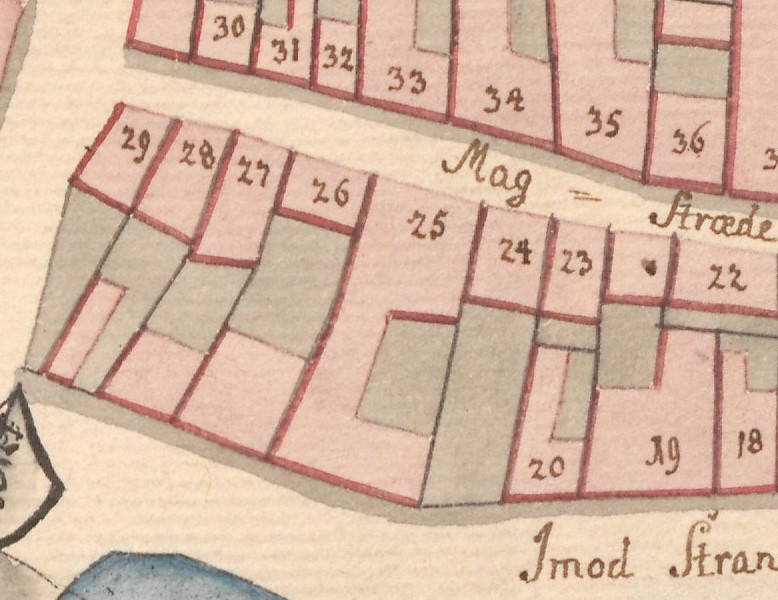
No. 25 seen on a detail from Christian Gedde's map of Snaren's Quarter, 1756.

The site was formerly made up of three separate properties. The property towards the canal was listed in Copenhagen's first cadastre of 1689 as No. 23 in Snaren's Quarter and belonged to skipper Peder Madsen at that time. The two other properties were listed as No. 31 and No. 32 and belonged to Bent Gutersen (No. 31) and distiller Hans Andersen (No. 32).

The three properties were later merged into a single property. Brewer Jens Møller operated a brewery on his property. It was listed in the new cadastre of 1756 as No. 25 in Snaren's Quarter and belonged to his widow at that time. A two-storey building was constructed towards the canal in around 1745.

=== H. C. Lange and his brewery ===
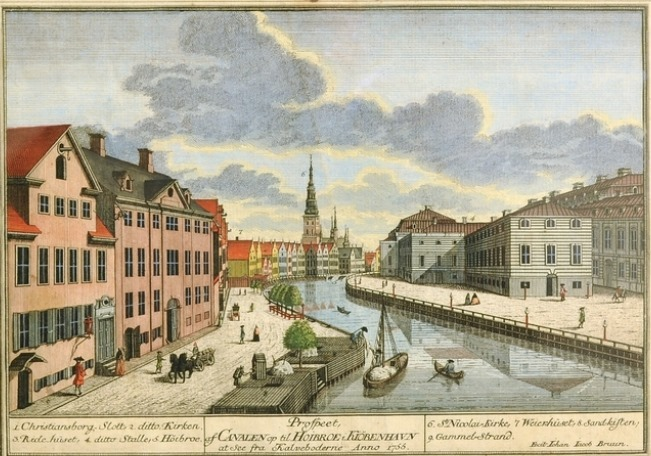
The building (second from the left) seen on a drawing from 1755.

Brewer Henrik Christian Langge(1756-1814) purchased the property in the mid-1780s. He also served as a treasurer for the Danish Asiatic Company. He lived there with his wife Elisabeth Clausen, a brewer, a brewery boy, a caretaker, a coachman two maids and one lodger at the time of the 1787 census. The lodger Hans Ebbesen worked as a senior clerk for the Danish Asiatic Company. Lange heightened the building with one storey in around 1790.

Lange's first son, Michael Lange (1788-1851, who would later become Lord President (Overpræsident) of Copenhagen, was born in 1788. He was later followed by three younger siblings: Charlotte Friederica Christiane (1793-), Friederich Wilhelm Emil (1795-) and Christian Marius (1800-).

Ernst Peymann (1737-1823), an officer in the engineering troops, was a resident of the building from 1784 to 1794.

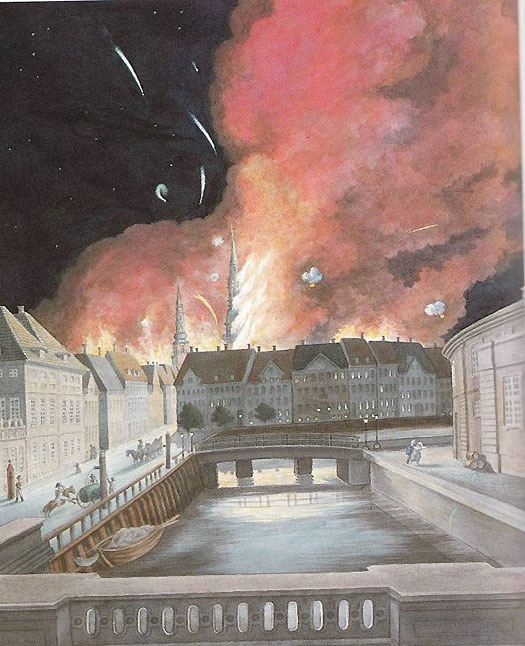
The building viewed from the Marble Bridge during the 1807 bombardment.

Lange's property was home to 21 residents in three households at the time of the 1801 census. The owner resided in one of the apartments with his wife, their four children, his wife's brother Marcus Clausen (ship doctor), a brewer, a caretaker, two maids and a wet nurse. Christian Thomassen Norup, who managed the brewery, resided in another apartment with his wife Marie Alling, two of their children (aged 32 and 33) and one maid. Iver Sørensen, a former stableman, resided in the building with his wife Kirstine Buch, their nine-year-old daughter Ane Cathrine [Sørensen] and the wife's brother Niels Christian Buch (tailor).

The property was listed in the new cadastre of 1806 as No. 21. The building was hit by a cannonball and caught fire during the British bombardment of Copenhagen in 1807.

=== Andreas Krogh and his brewery ===
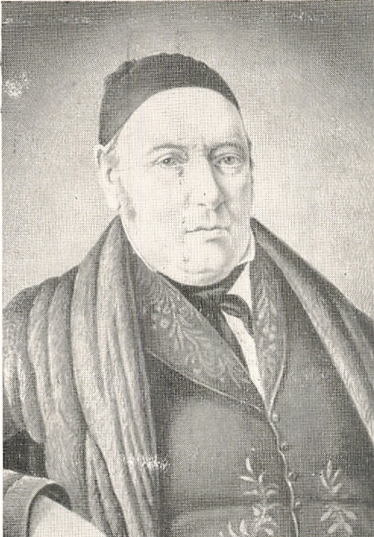
Andreas Krogh

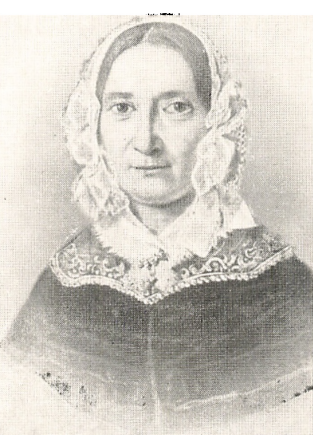
Marie Krogh

The property was around the time of the bombardment acquired by brewer Andreas Krogh (1781-1858). The building was hit by a cannonball during the bombardment (or the next one in 1807). The cannonball was subsequently embedded in the wall above the basement entrance as a memorial to the event. The present building in Magstræde was constructed for Krogh as a new brewery building in 1808–1809. The buildings in Nybrogade and Magstgræde were both heightened for Krogh in 1827. The theologian Peter Rørdam (1806-1883) was among the residents of the building in 1833.

Krogh's property was home to a total of 45 residents at the time of the 1840 census. Krogh resided on the ground floor to the left with his wife Inger Marie Brick, their 24-year-old son Andreas Lauritz Kragh, a housekeeper (husjomfru), a maid and seven brewery workers. Ludvig Ferdinand Veyle, a musician in the Royal Danish Orchestra, resided on the ground floor to the right with his wife Dorthea Hendriette Corfitsenm their three children (aged three to seven) and one maid. Henriette Pauline Stage, widow of mate in the Danish Asiatic Company Georg Gottlob Stage (1766–1826), resided on the first floor with four unmarried children (aged 30 to 39), one maid and one lodger. One of the sons, Carl Frederik Gottlob Stage (1805-1892), a ship captain, would later become a ship-owner and founder of the Georg Stage Foundation, Justus Alexander von Stricker (1778-1941), a colonel and director of the fire corps of the old Copenhagen County, resided on the second floor with his wife Maria Amalia Henricca (née Stintzing), their five children (aged 14 to 29), one maid and the lodger Johann Petersen Klodsstrou (soldier in the King's Regiment). Carl Wilhelm Wichfeld, a clerk (kammerskriver) in General Tldkammeret, resided on the third floor with his wife Charlotte Amalie Petersen, their six-year-old son Carl Harald Ernst, one lodger and one maid. Hans Petersen, a sand trader, resided in the basement with his wife Anne Sophie Jensenm their three children (aged eight to 12) and one maid. The canal front in front of the building was the site of the so-called "Sandbox" /Sandkisten), a storage facility for sand. The sand was transported to the site by barge. It was then sold by the sand traders to the so-called "sandmen", who drove around in the streets with their carriages. Women would then call down to them from the windows: "Hey Sandman, come up with a skæppe!" (1 skæppe = 17.3 liter),

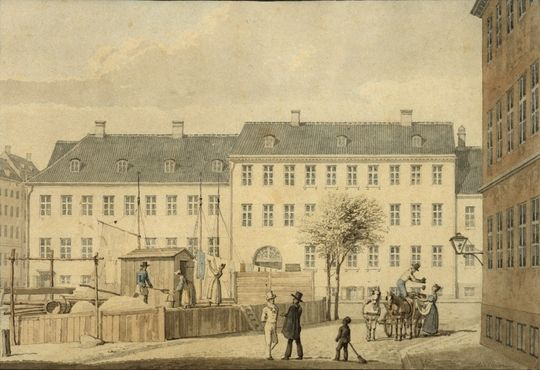
H.G.F. Holm: The "Sandbox" at Nybrogade, 1835.

The mathematician and later politician Adolph Steen (1816-1886) was a resident of the building in 1844. The 26-year-old Johan Krohn (1841-1925) was among the residents on the third floor in 1867 but would soon thereafter move to Bregentved where he served as a tutor for five years before returning to Copenhagen.

Krog's property was home to seven households at the time of the 1850 census. The 70-year-old owner resided on the first floor with the widow Christsine Marie Drechmann, her eight-year-old daughter Marie Magdalene Drechmann, a female cook and three maids. Christen Hermansen, a professor of theology and orientalist, resided on the ground floor. Abigael Hendriette Rønne. a widow, resided on the same floor with a housekeeper and a maid. Joachim Georg Johan Nicolay Jørgensen, a painter and colonel in Copenhagenøs Civilian Artillery, resided on the second floor with his wife Caroline Margrethe (née Johansen), their six children (aged 10 to 18) and two maids. Jacob Christian Juul, a secretary in Generaladjutantenm, resided on the third floor with his wife Louise Andrea Juul and his sister Charlotte Laura Juul. Georg Christ. Houhton, a medical doctor, resided on the same floor. Jens Andersen, a sand trader, resided in the basement with his wife Mette Kirstine Jensen. their two-year-old son and a maid.

=== 1860 census ===
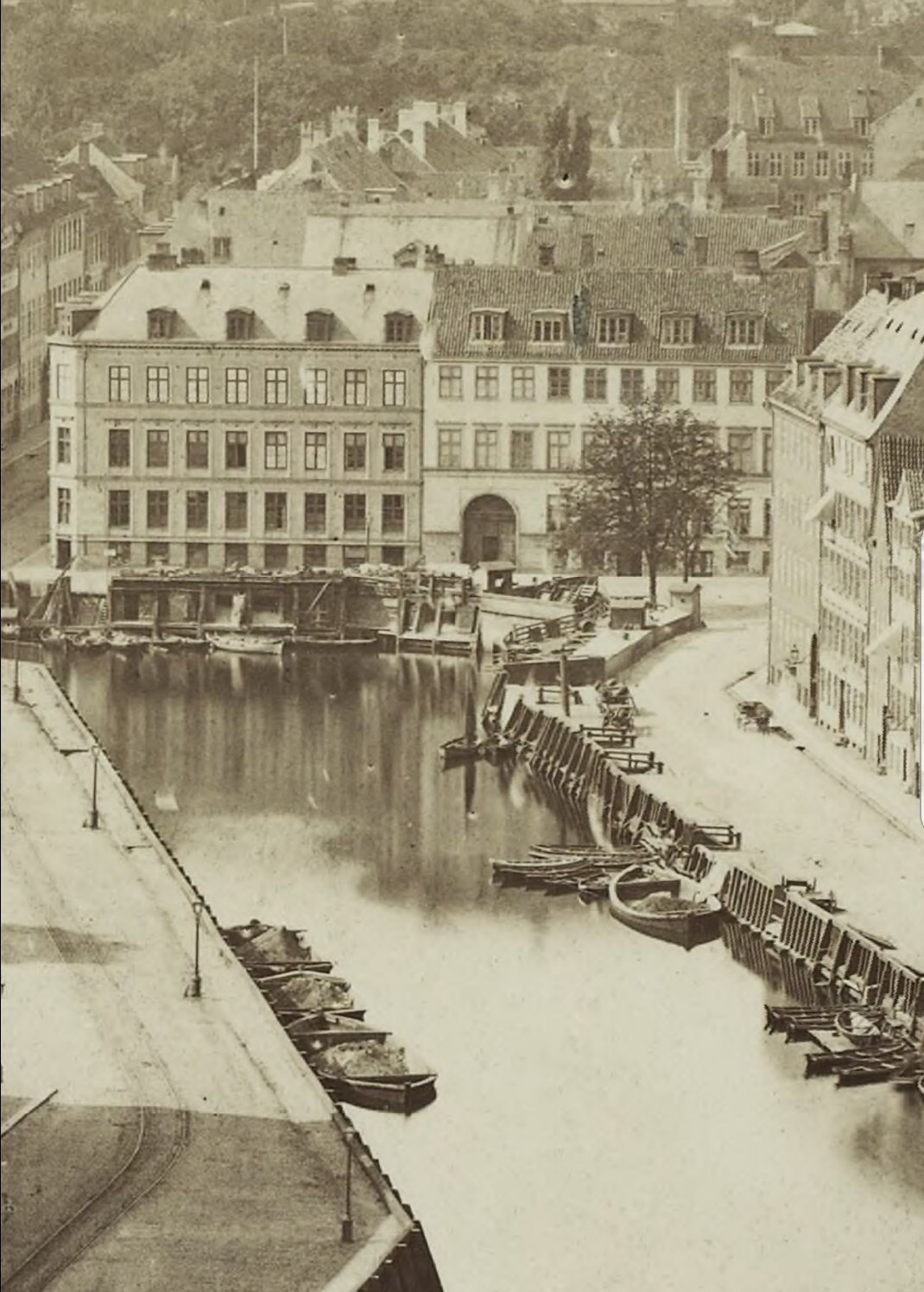
The sand depot in front of the building in the late 19th century

The property was listed as Nybrogade 26 when house numbering was introduced as a supplement to the old cadastrel numbers in 1859. The property was home to a total of 30 residents at the time of the 1860 census. Mads Christian Petersen, a brewery worker, resided on the ground floor to the left with his wife Margrethe Petersen (née Hansdatter). Carl Theodor Jespersen (1823-1908), a businessman, resided on the first floor with his wife Martha Sofie f. Eegholm and one maid. Jespersen was the owner of the wine wholesale firm Th. Jespersen & Co. (from 1862: T. Jespersen & Co.). Joachim Georg Johan Nicolaj Jørgensen, a broker, resided on the second floor with his wife Caroline Margrethe (née Johansen), three of their children (aged 20 ti 22) and two maids. Julius Edvard Lunddahl, a theologian and later teacher at Sorø Grammar School, resided on the third floor with the widow Elisa Prydz (née Liebind), her 18-year-old daughter Anna Margrethe Prydz and one maid. Jens Andersen, a nre sand trader, resided in the basement with his wife Mette Kirstine Jensen, their three children (aged three to 19), one male servant and one maid. A master tailor and his wife resided in the basement. give brewery workers resided in the rear wing.

=== 20th century ===
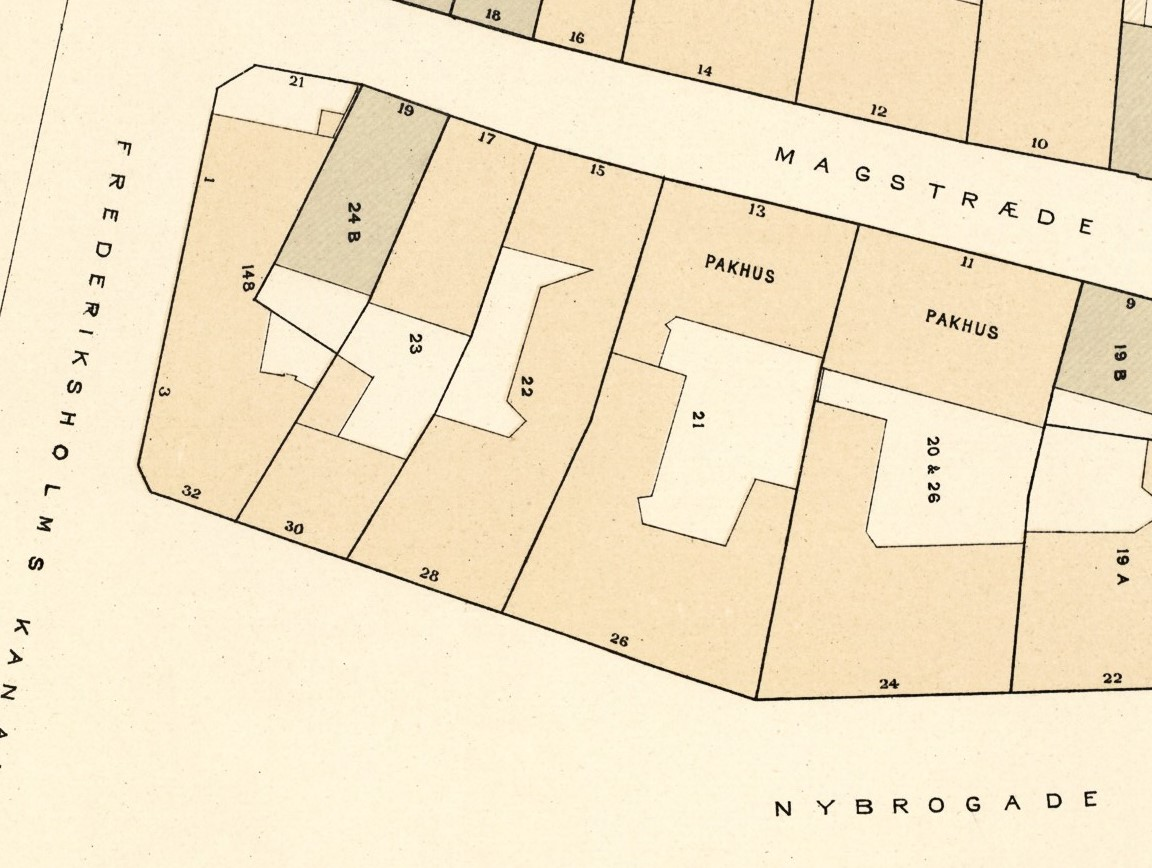
Nybrogade 26 seen on a detail from Berggreen's cadastral map of Snaren's Quarter, 1884.

Nybrogade 26 was home to 24 residents at the 1906 census. Alvilda Eleonora, a 54-year-old widow, resided with her four children (aged 15–24) in the apartment on the ground floor to the left. Poul Hein Haslund, a physician, resided on the second floor with his family. Vilhelm Bruun (1858-1917), an architect, resided on the third floor to the left. Henriette Hartvig (1833-1920), widow of the businessman Julius Hartvig (1821-1875), resided on the third floor to the right with one maid. Jens Simon Koch (1871-1935), a lawyer and writer, resided on the fourth floor with his wife. The artist Wilhelm P. Jensenresided on the second floor of the rear wing

== Architecture ==
=== Nybrogade 26 ===
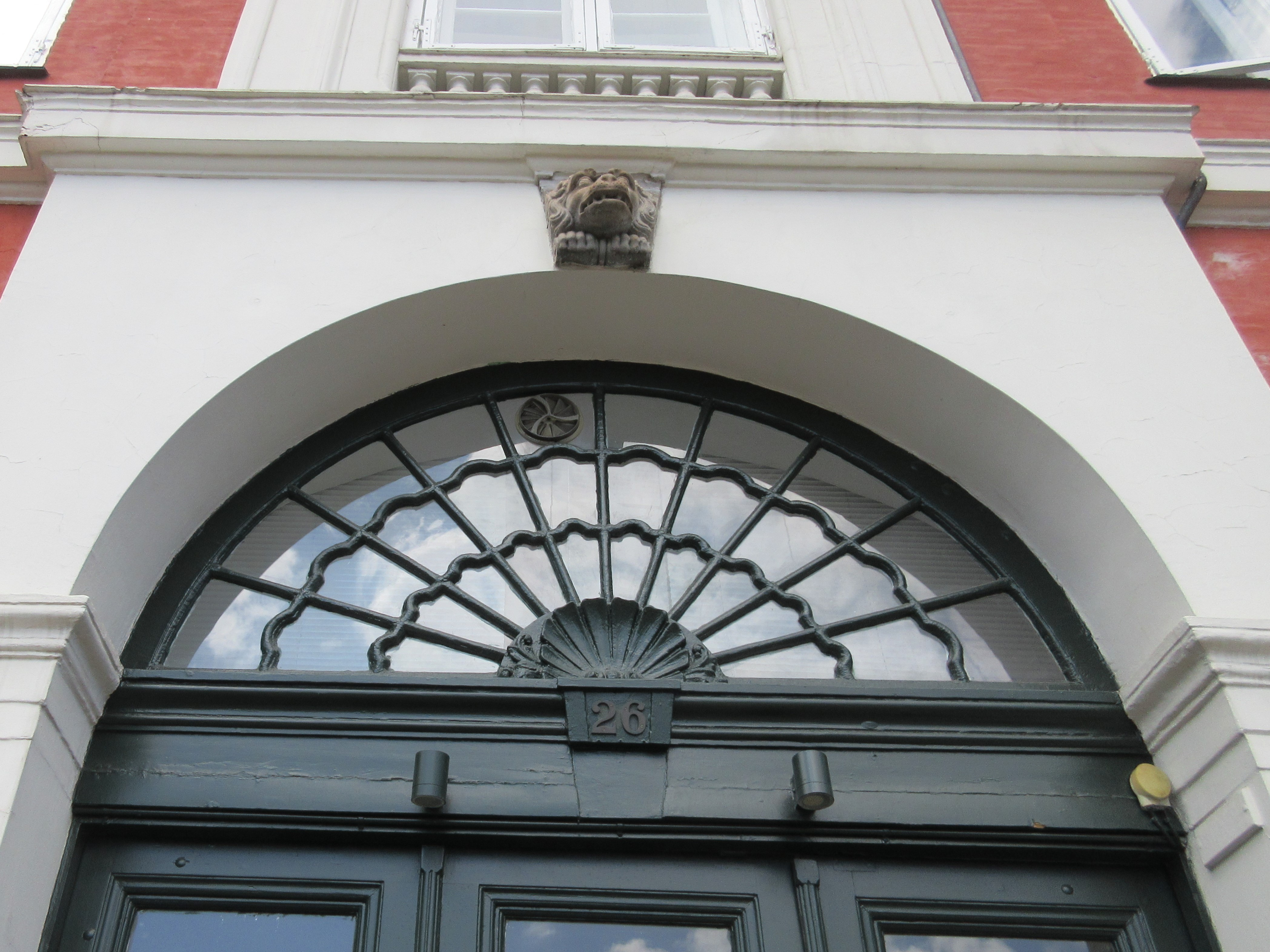
The fanlight

Nybrogade 26 was constructed as a two-storey structure in around 1745 and later heightened in around 1790 and again in 1827. The building owes its current appearance to a renovation in 1852. The seven-bays-wide building front is vertically divided by lesenes between the windows. It is rendered in a red colour, contrasted by the white windows, cornice, cornice band above the ground floor and white details around the gate and windows in the central bay on the three lower floors. The central bay on the second floor features a balcony and there is a blind balustrade below the central window on the first floor. The gate features a fanlight and above it is a lion head. The cannonball that hit the building during the British bombardment of Copenhagen in 1796 has been inserted in the wall above the cellar entrance.

=== Magstræde 13 ===
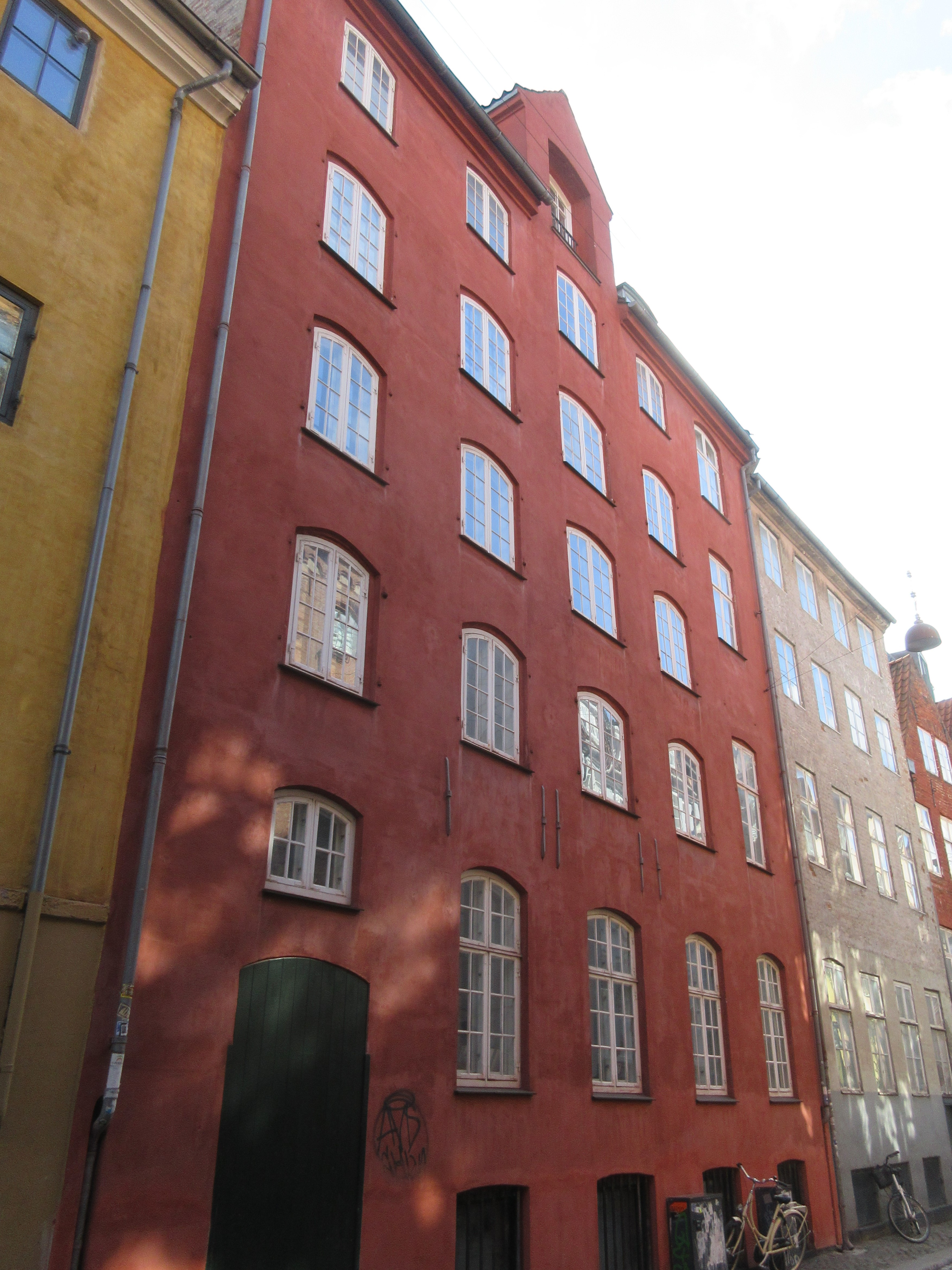
Magstræde 13 viewed from the yard

Magstræde 13 is a five-storey structure built in brick. The front side is plastered in a red colour. The windows are relatively small and slightly arched. The roof features a central wall dormer which was originally the site of a pulley. The building is towards the yard finished in a yellow colour. The slightly projecting central bay is also on this side of the building tipped by a wall dormer.

The entire complex was listed in the Danish registry of protected buildings and places in 1918.

== Today ==
The building is today owned by Peter Andreas Amdrup. The arms retailer Arms Gallery opened in the building in 1876.

== Gallery ==
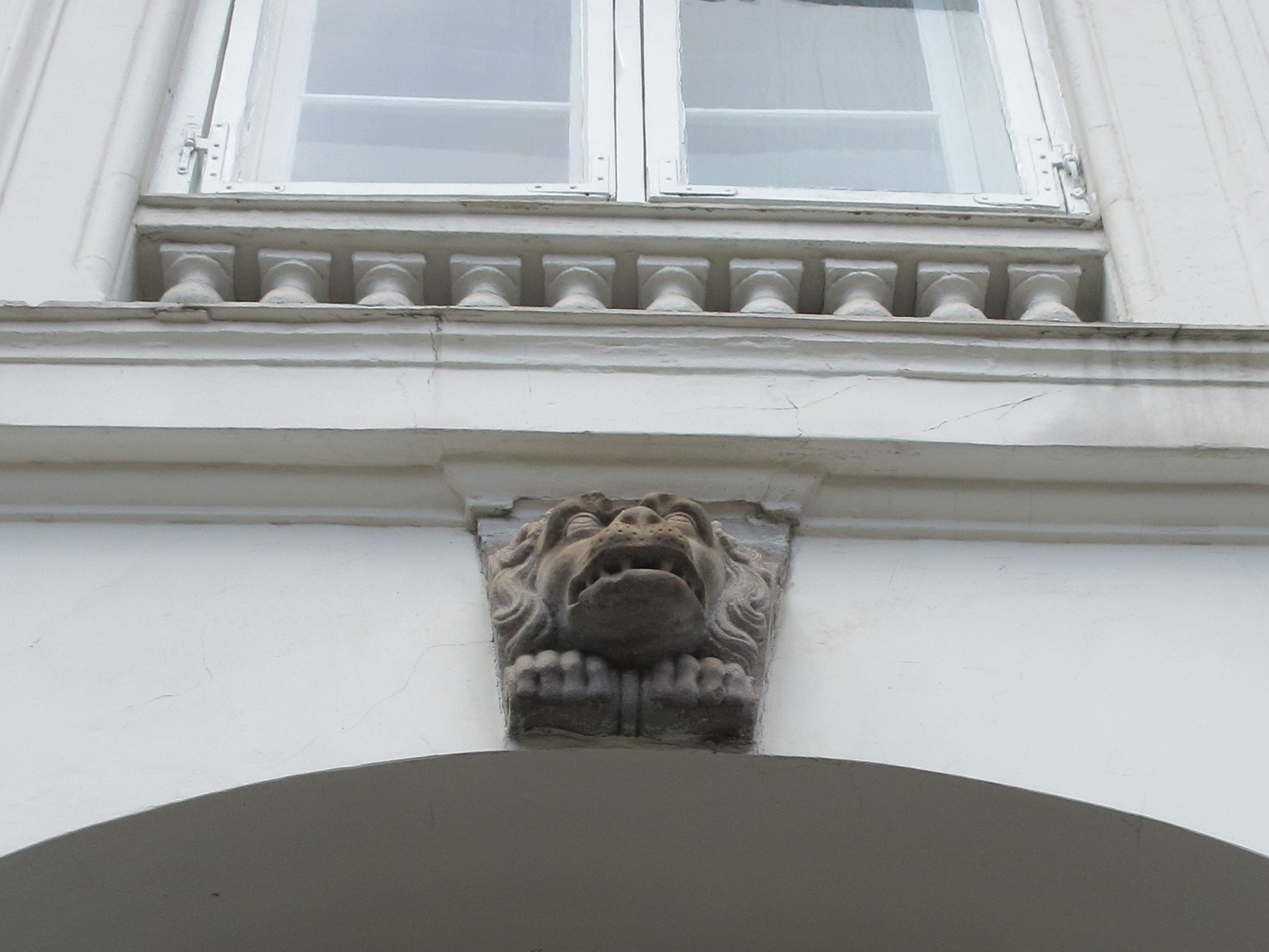
Lion head above the gate

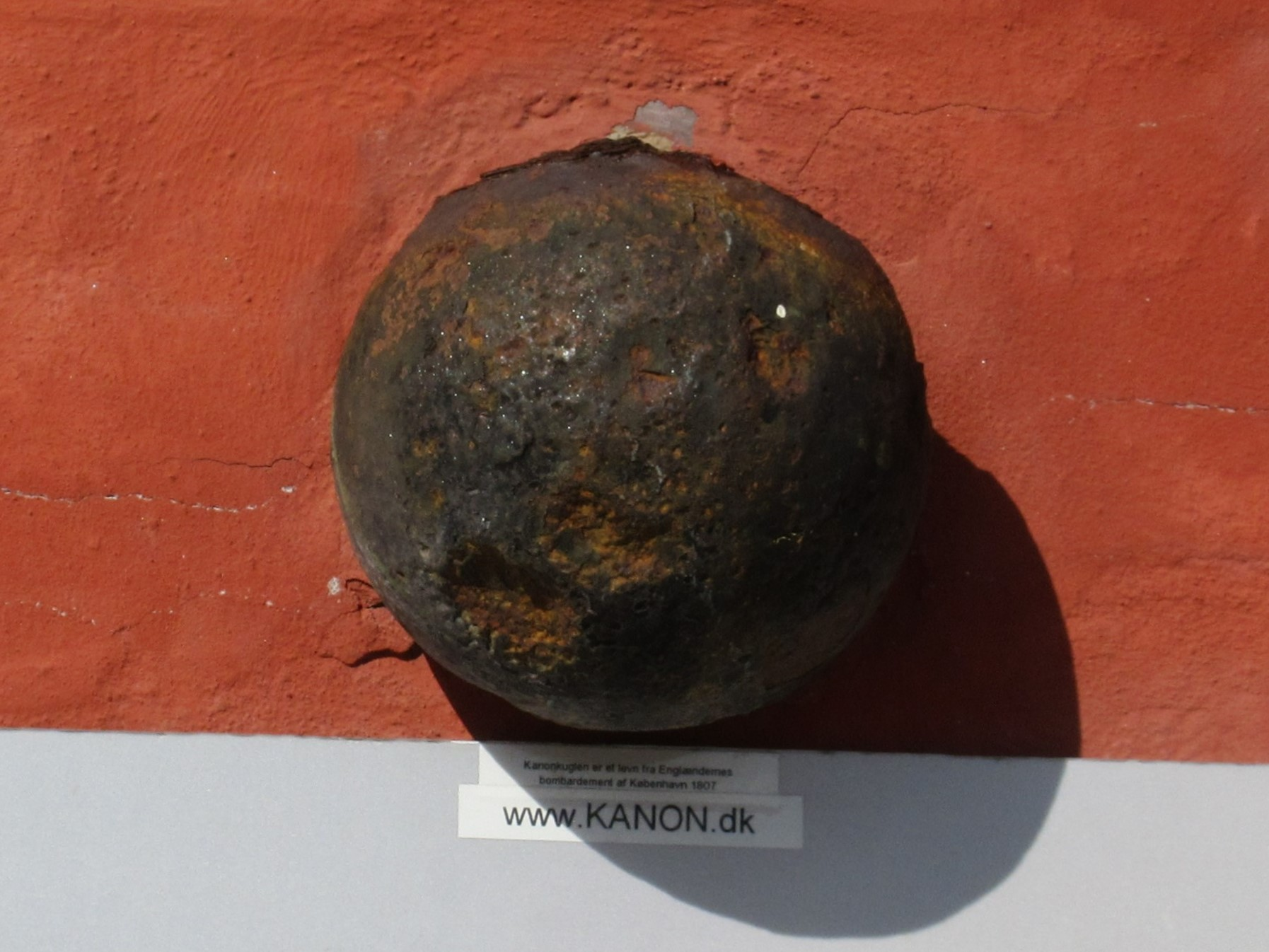
The cannonball embedded in the wall above the cellar entrance

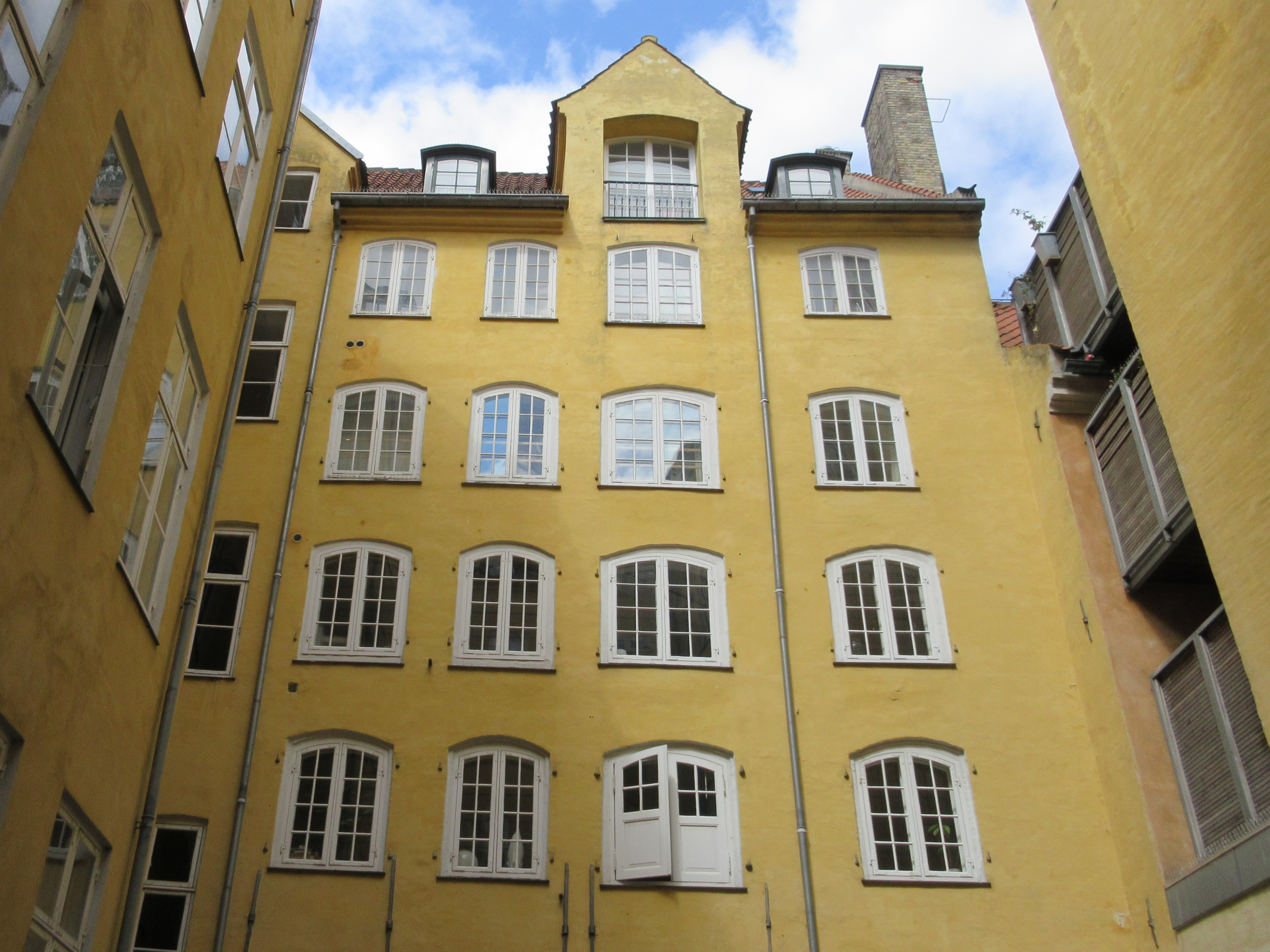
Magstræde 13 seen from the yard
