= Stormgade 8 =

Building in Copenhagen

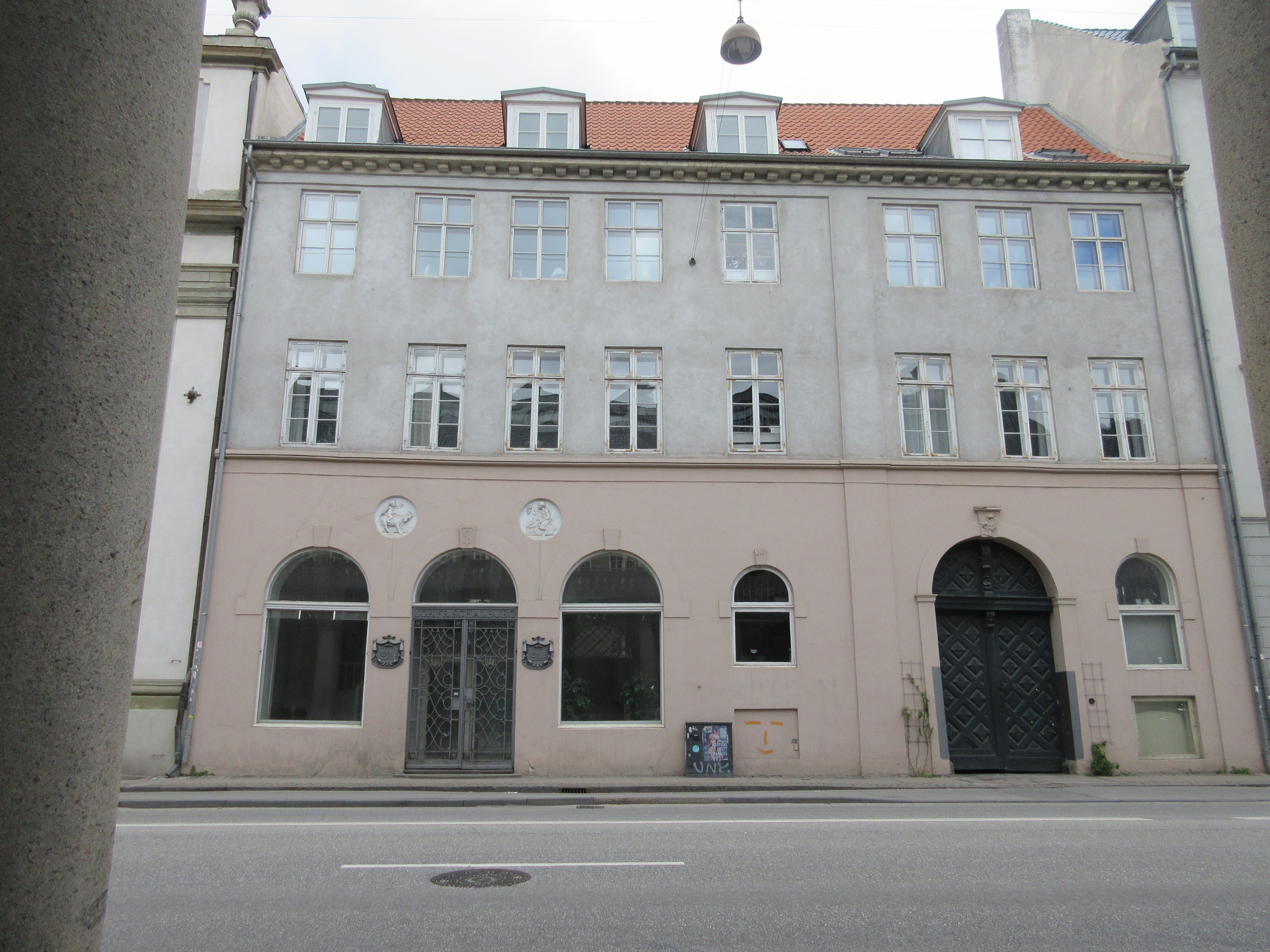
- Interactive map of the Stormgade 8 area

General information
- Location: Copenhagen, Denmark
- Coordinates: 55°40′30.83″N 12°34′28.78″E
- Completed: 1747
- Renovated: 1845 (heightened)

Stormgade 8 is a three-storey, 18th century property situated at Stormgade 8 in Copenhagen, Denmark. The buildingwas listed in the Danish registry of protected buildings and places in 1918.

== History ==
=== 18th century ===
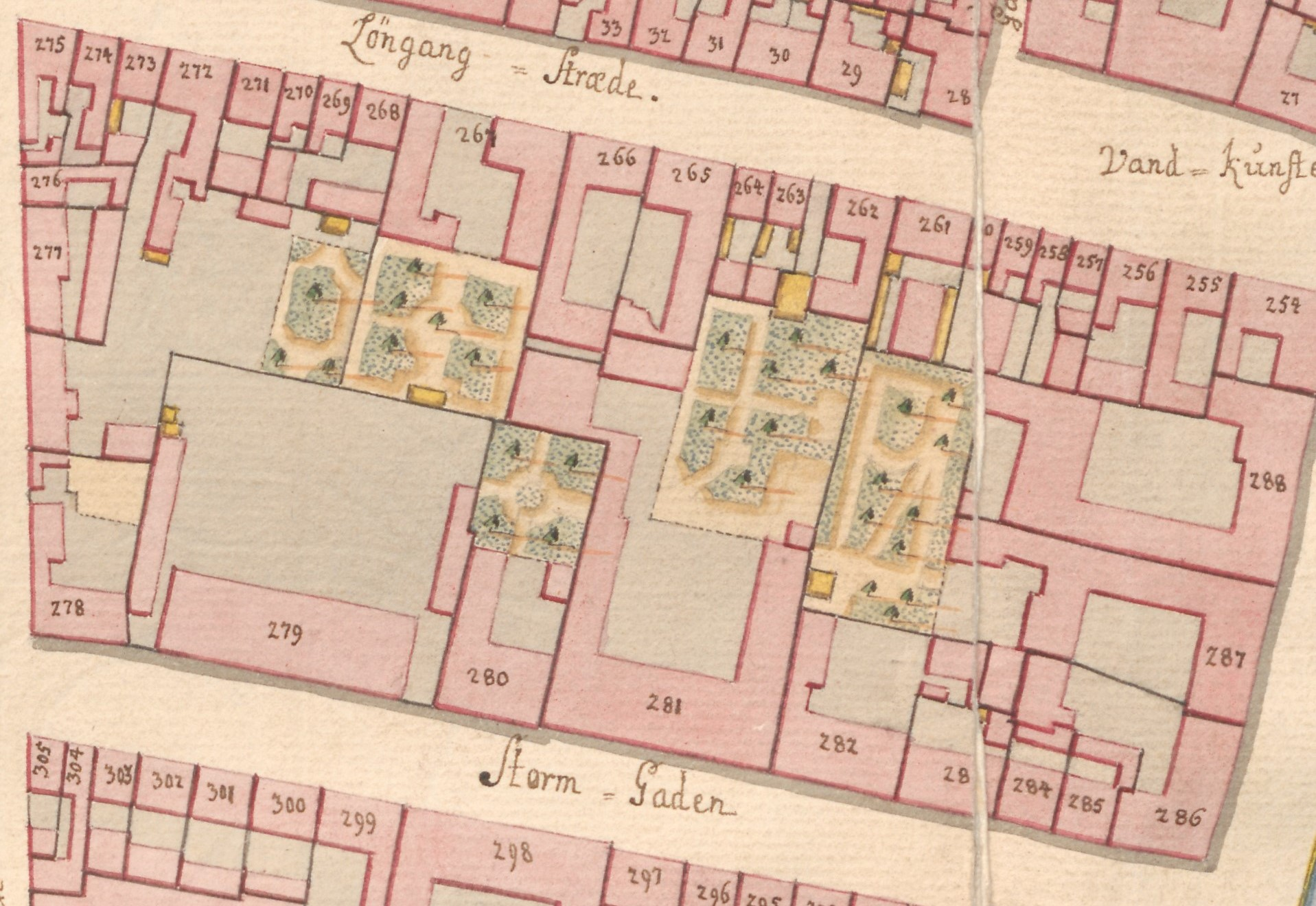
No. 282 seen on a detail from Christian Gedde's map of Copenhagen's West Quarter, 1757.

The site was formerly part of the same property as Stormgade 6 and Stormgade 4. This large property was listed in Copenhagen's first cadastre of 1689 as No. 252 in the city's West Quarter (Vester Kvarter), owned by one lieutenant-colonel Robert. The property was later divided into three smaller properties. Two small townhouses on the site (built before 1737) were merged into a single property before 1747. The property now known as Stormgade 8 was listed in the new cadastre of 1756 as No. 282 and belonged to Johan Ludvig Abbestée (1697-1774) at that time.

Adolph Sigfried von der Osten resided in the building from 1786 to 1794.

=== 19th century ===
The property was listed in the new cadastre of 1806 as No. 186 in the West Quarter. It was owned by justitsråd Jacob Brønnum Scavenius at that time. In 1811, he purchased the much larger Barchmann Mansion at the corner of Frederiksholms Kanal and Store Kongensgade.

Samfundet for Vanføre (now Sahva), a society for the relief of disabled people, purchased the building in 1888 after selling its old building on Toldbodvej to the politician Jacob Brønnum Scavenius Estrup. The society was based in the building until 1896.

=== Johan Fr. Schalburg ===
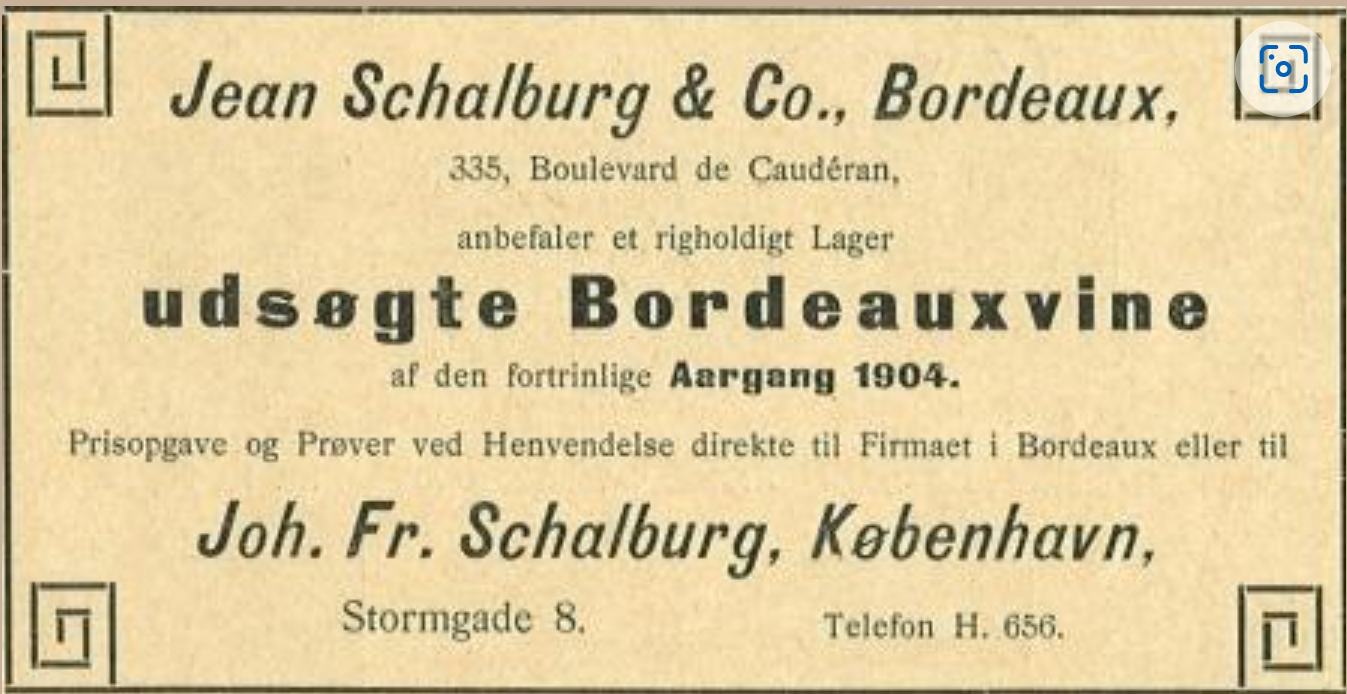
Advert for Johan F. Schalburg from Illustreret Tidende.

The building was later acquired by the vintner Johan Fr. Schalburg. The company had been founded by Johan Heinrich Schalburg on 7 June 1817 in Nyborg on Funen and was moved to Copenhagen in 1870.

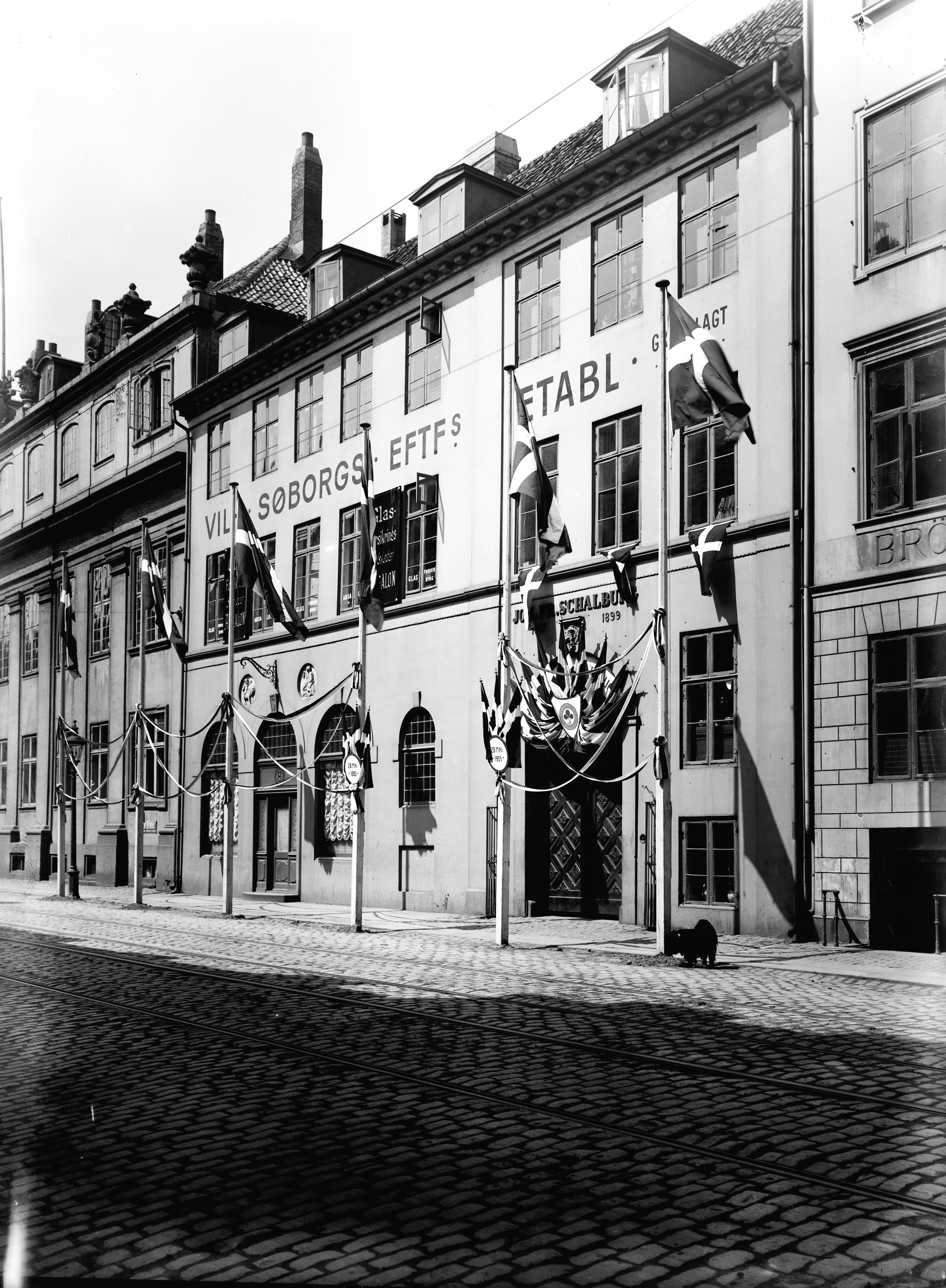
Frederik Riise: Joh. Fr. Schalburg celebrating its 25-year anniversary at Stormgade 8, 1905.

Evald Bach (born 1898) acquired the firm in 1938. It was based at Stormgade 8 until at least the 1950s.

The printing business Vilh. Søborg's Efterfølger was also based in the building in 1910. In 1945, it relocated to Amaliegade 11. Dansk Dental Depor, a wholesale Company catering to dental clinics, was also based in the building in 1950.

== Architecture ==
The two town houses from 1838 which were merged into a single property in 1748 were both two storeys tall. The western town house was just three bays wide. The eastern town house was four bays wide and its ground floor was originally used as stable. A perpendicular building on the rear was also merged into the property in 1748. The entire complex was heightened by one floor in 1845. The building front seen today dates mainly from this renovation. The gateways from both of theoriginal houses has been retained. Two round reliefs are embedded in the wall above the western gateway, depicting a man riding an oxen /left) and a seated man holding a bunch og grapes (right).

== Today ==
On the first floor is a five-room condominium. On the second floor is an eight-room condominium.

== Gallery ==
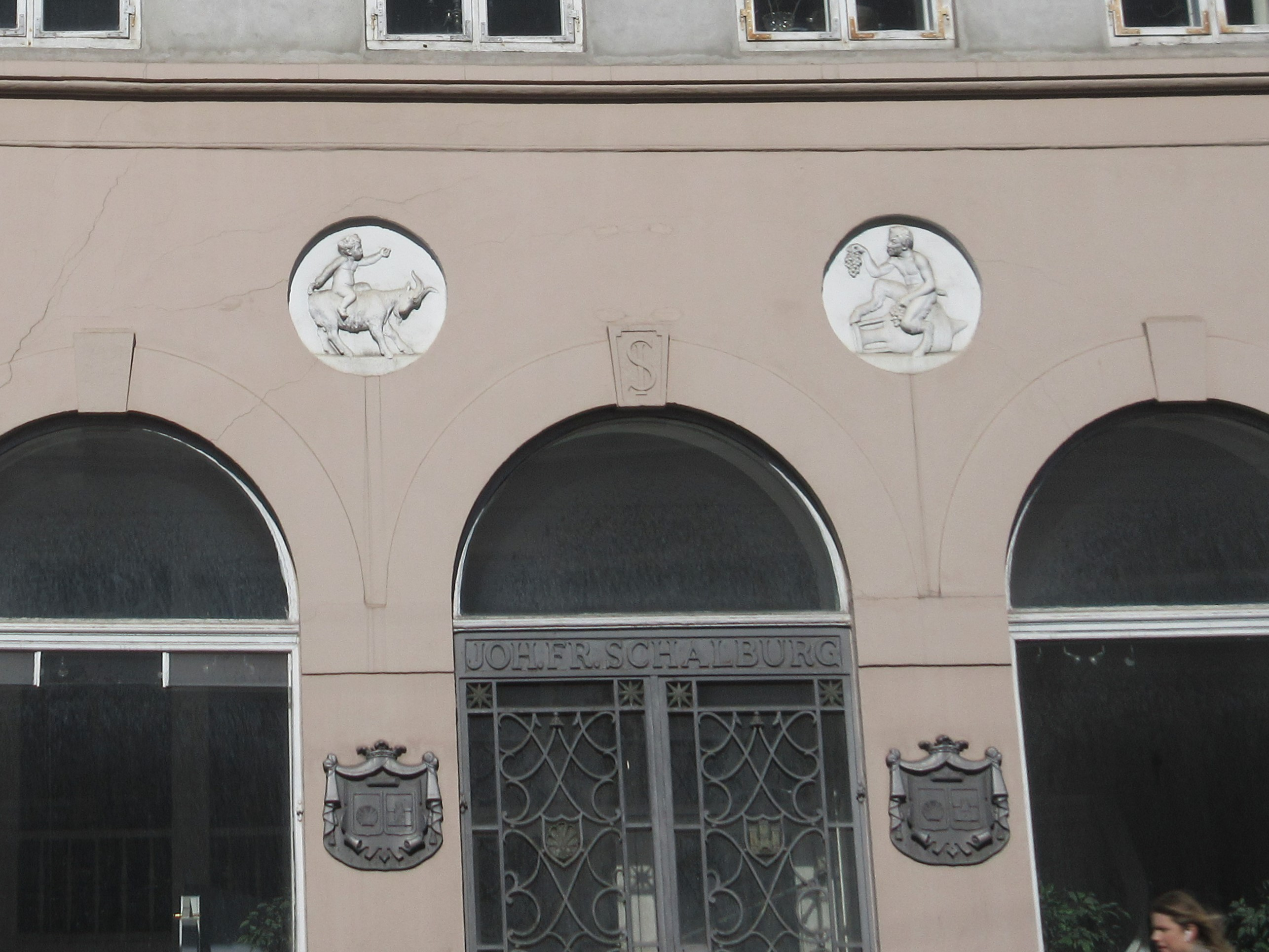

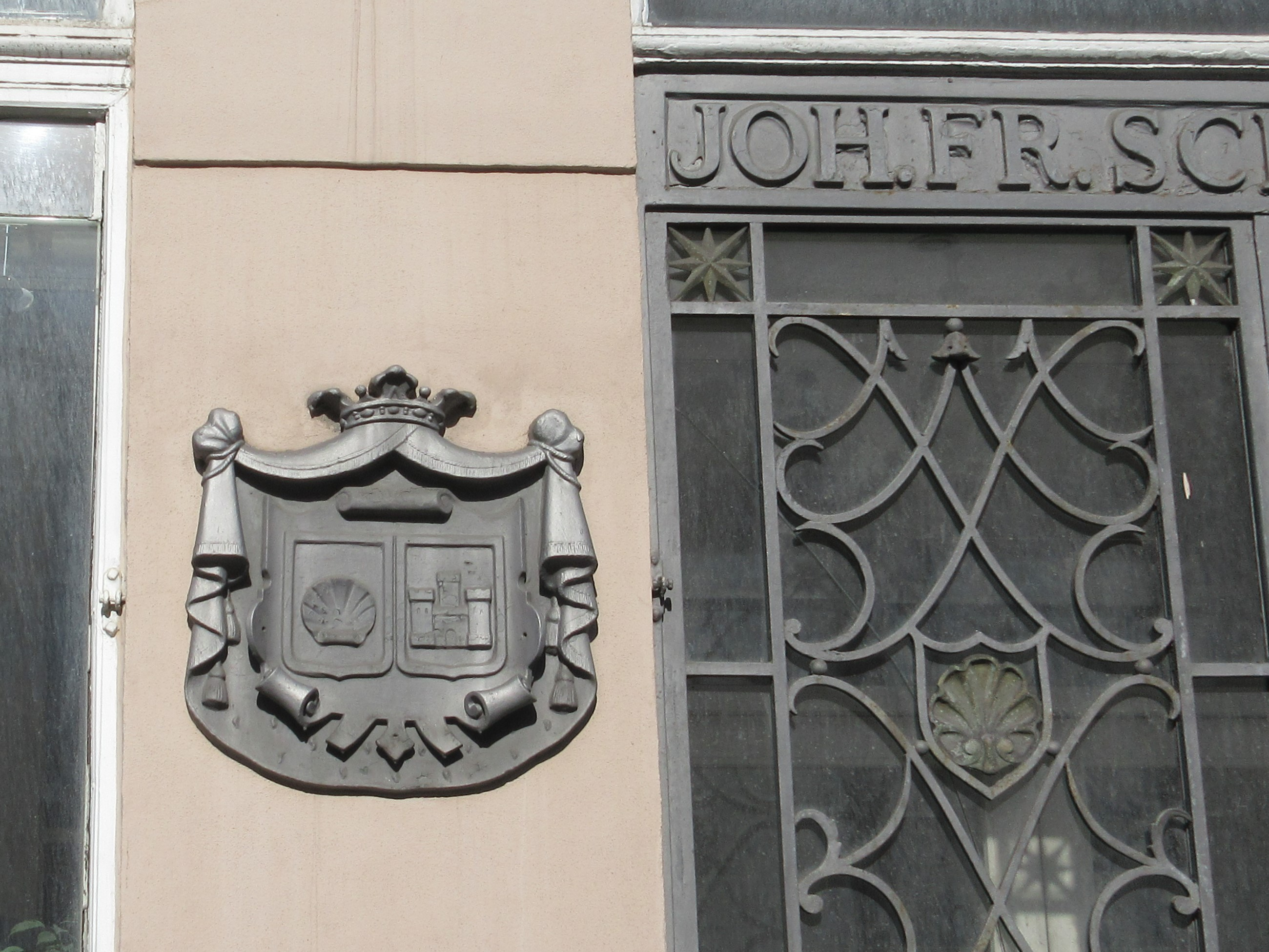

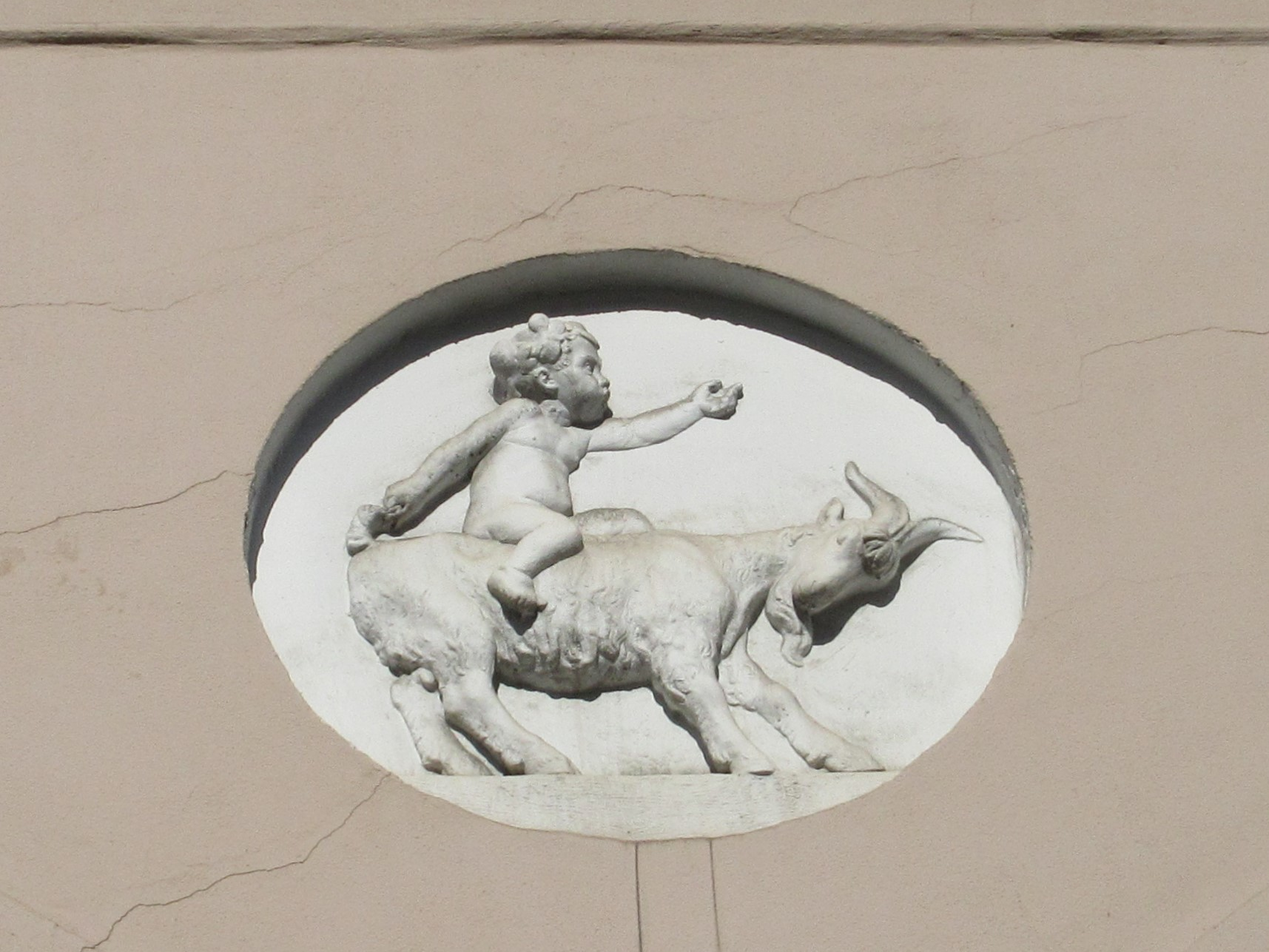

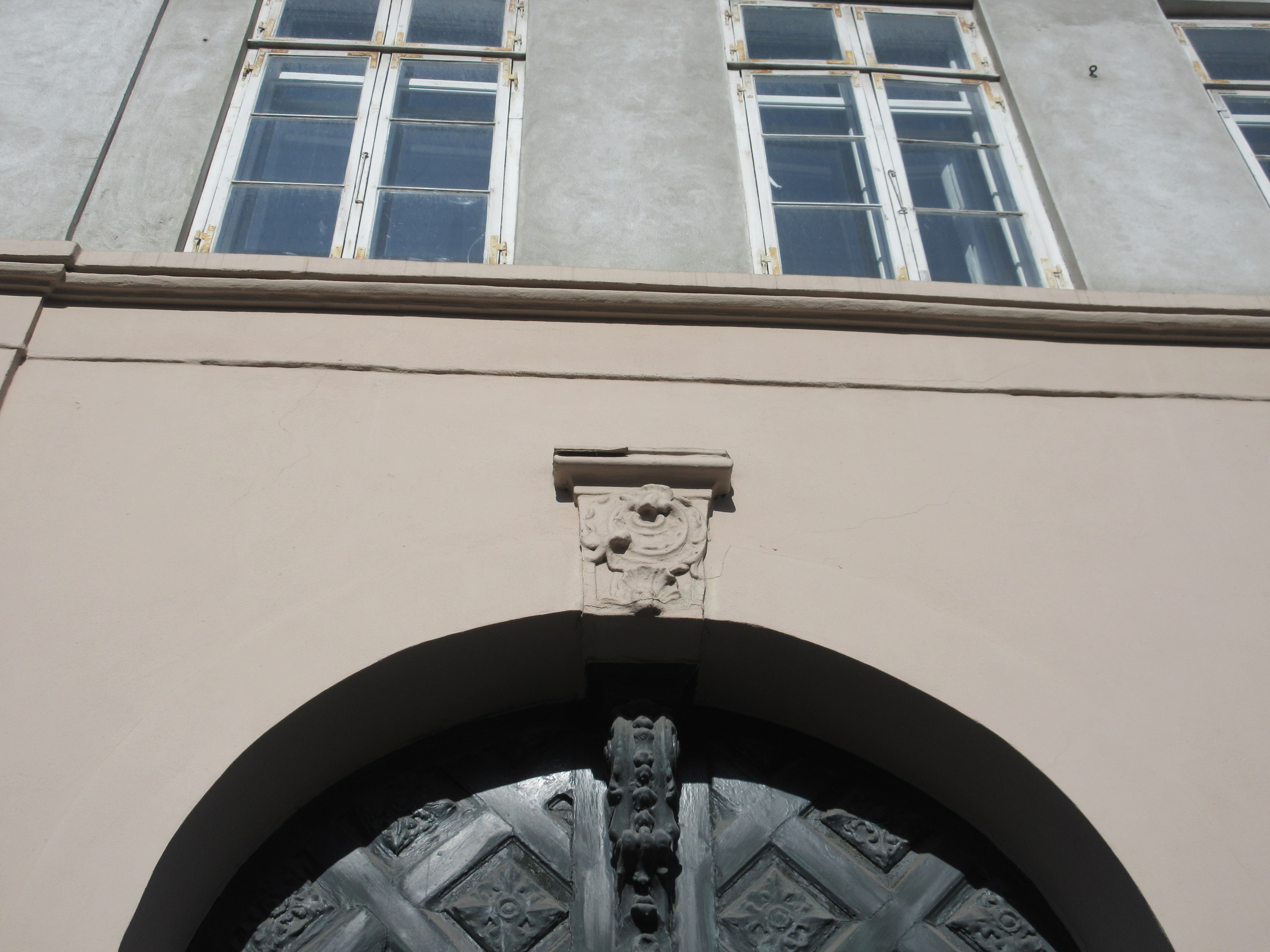
