= Amaliegade 11 =

Building in Copenhagen

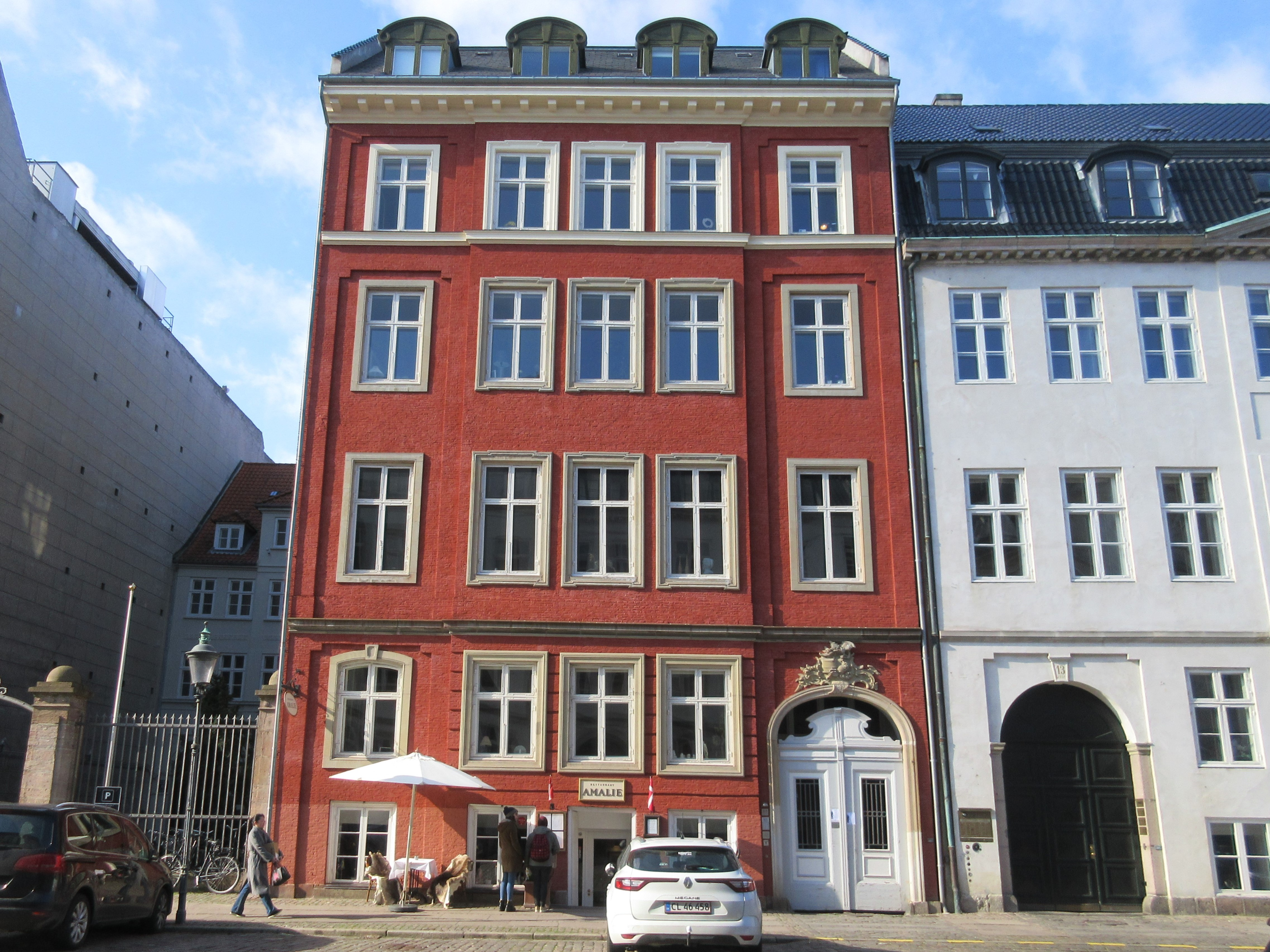
- Interactive map of the Amaliegade 11 area

General information
- Location: Copenhagen, Denmark
- Coordinates: 55°40′58.01″N 12°35′31.02″E
- Completed: 1755
- Renovated: 1870s

Design and construction
- Architect: Nicolai Eigtved

Amaliegade 11 is a former 18th century town house in the Frederiksstaden neighborhood of central Copenhagen, Denmark. The house was originally constructed in the mid-1750s with a facade design by Niels Eigtved in accordance with his overall guidelines for buildings in the new district. In the 1870s, it was acquired by silversmith Vilhelm Christesen and heightened to four storeys. On its rear is a succession of three free-standing secondary buildings separated by small courtyards. The building fronting the street and the two first rear wings, both of which are half-timbered, were listed in the Danish registry of protected buildings and places in 1978. Other notable former residents include two later admirals and a foreign minister.

== History ==
=== 18th century ===
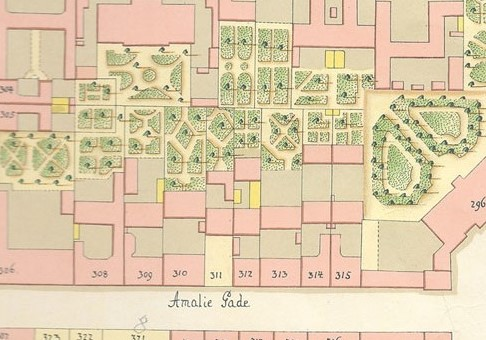
No. 312 seen in a detail from Christian Gedde's map of St. Ann's Rast Quarter, 1757

When Frederiksstaden was founded in 1750, it was initially envisioned as a district for the nobility and the city's most wealthy merchants. It soon proved difficult to sell the lots and some of them were therefore sold to well-to-do craftsmen. Jan Jansen, a cooper, purchased a long narrow lot at the site. He started out by constructing two half-timbered secondary buildings on the central part of his new property in 1753. In 1854–55, they were followed by a more elegant building vfronting the street. The facade was like many of the other houses from the same years in the street designed by the architect Nicolai Eigtved. Eigtved had also created the masterplan for the new district. On the rear of Jensen's property was a small garden.

In the new cadastre of 1756, the property was listed as No. 71 X. on Christian Gede's district map of St. Ann's East Quarter from 1757, it is marked as No. 312.

The property was by 1787 owned by the 47-year-old widow Else Margrethe Jansen. She lived in one of the apartments with her four children (aged 11 to 17) and a female cook. Anne Sophie Klein, another widow, resided in another apartment with three unmarried daughters (aged 19 to 35). Hans Hansen Kaabesholt, a first mate (styrmand), resided in a third apartment with his wife Kirstine Marie, their one-year-old daughter and an eight-year-old daughter from the wife's first marriage. Peder Børre, a skipper, resided in the building with his Dorthe Sophie Qvist and a female cook. Else Margrethe, a 47-year-old widow, resided in the building with a female cook. Dorthe Cathrine Kock, a 47-year-old widow, resided in the building with her three children (aged 7 to 17) and a female cook. Schiubart, another widow, resided in the building with a female cook. Friderich Wium (1740-1799), a secretary (depechesekretær) in Generalitetet), resided in the building with his wife Johanne Elisabeth Reiersen, their two children (aged seven and nine), a maid and a female cook. The wife's brother was the wealthy businessman and landowner Niels Lunde Reiersen. Jens Bruun, the proprietor of a tavern in the basement, resided in the associated dwelling with his wife Maren Bruun, their six children (aged nine to 25) and a female cook.

=== Qleugel family ===
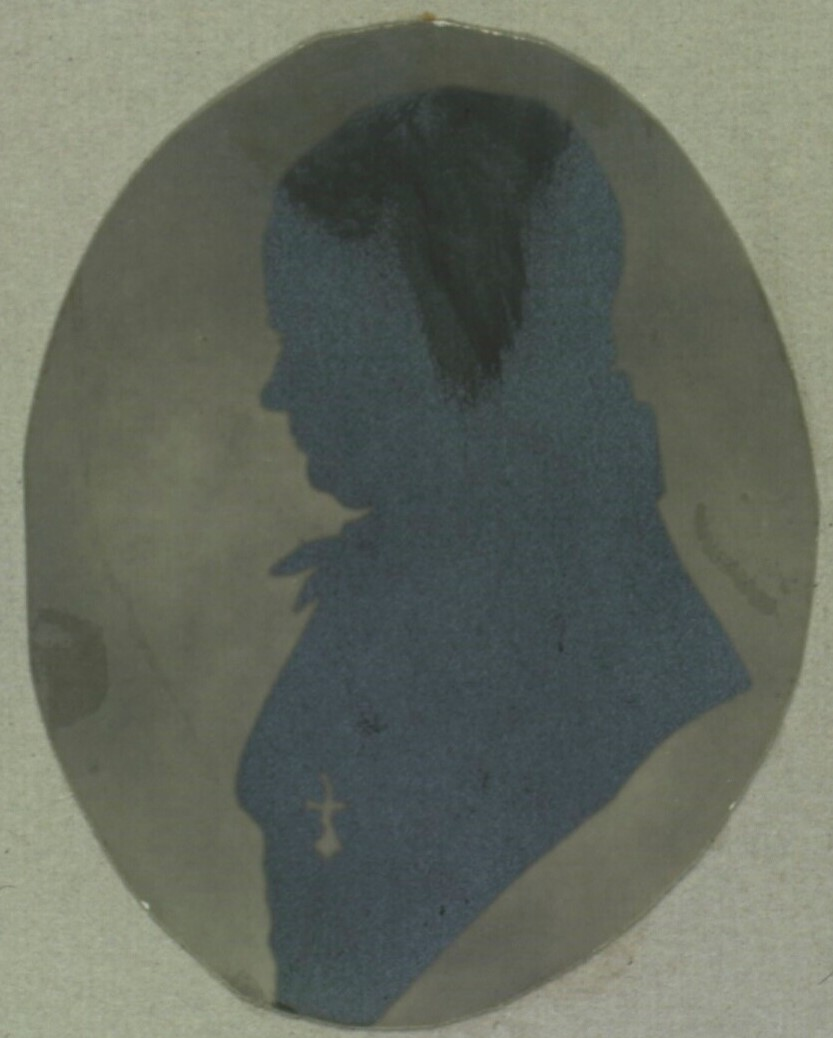
Peter Johan Wleugel

The property was at some point acquired by the naval officer Peter Johan Wleugel (1766–1835). In the new cadastre of 1806, his property was listed as St. Ann's Quarter, No. 154 om St. Ann's East Quarter. During the Battle of Copenhagen, in August 1807, he served as commander of the brig Mercurius which was stationed at Kalbebod Beach. He reached the rank of counter admiral in 1833.

Wleugel's daughter Nicoline Christine Wleugel married the naval officer Ove Wilhelm Michelsen ( 1800-1880). They lived in the building in the early 1830s. Their daughter Michelsen, Mathilde Pouline Nicoline (1831-1864) was at least born in the building on 28 October 1831.

=== 1749s ===
Holger Christian Reedtz (1800-1857), who then served as secretary of the Department of Foreign Affairs, resided in the building from 1832 to 1835.

No. 154 was at the time of the 1840 census home to a total of 66 people. The actress at the Royal Danish Theatre Nathalia Ryge was in 1840 in the ground floor apartment.

Carl Edouard van Dockum (1804-1893), a naval officer, was among the residents in 1845–46. He had just returned to Copenhagen after serving as commander of the brig Najaden on a voyage to New York City and moved when he was appointed as head of the Naval Cadet Academy.

=== Christesen ===
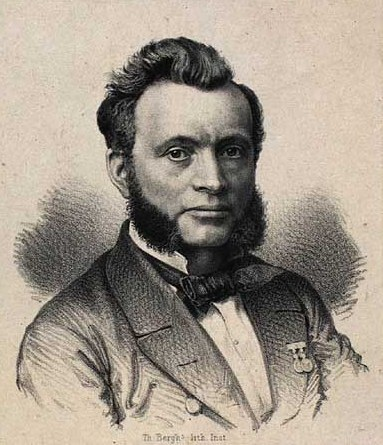
Vilhelm Christesen

The silversmith and manufacturer Vilhelm Christesen was from 1858 based in the first of the three rear wings. He resided with his family in the apartment on the second floor. His silver workshop occupied the two lower floors while the attic housed the gold workshop. In 1878, he was able to purchase the entire property. From then on the family resided in the more prestigious apartment on the first floor of the front wing. He heightened the building to four storeys. Water and gas was also installed in all apartments. The basement of the building fronting the street was converted into a commercial space with a residential apartment for the tenant on its rear. The premises were over the next years mainly operated as a tavern.

Christesen's firm was especially remowned for its 'Ancient Norse' style jewellery, copying archeological objects, from the Bronze Age to the medieval period. The company's work was popular in England where it was copied by læcal goldsmiths. Christesen died in 1899 and is buried in the Cemetery of Holmen.

=== 20th century ===
A restaurant named Teatercaféen, literally "The Teatre Café", was in the 1930s based in the basement. Its name was no doubt inspired by Casino Teatret on the other side of the street.

Vilh. Søborg's Efterfølger, a printing business, was from 1845 based in the building. It had until then been based at Stormgade 6.

Albert Madsen's Eftf, a retailer of furnishings and fittings for ships, was in 1072 based in the basement. The company had until then been based at Havnegade 51.

== Architecture ==
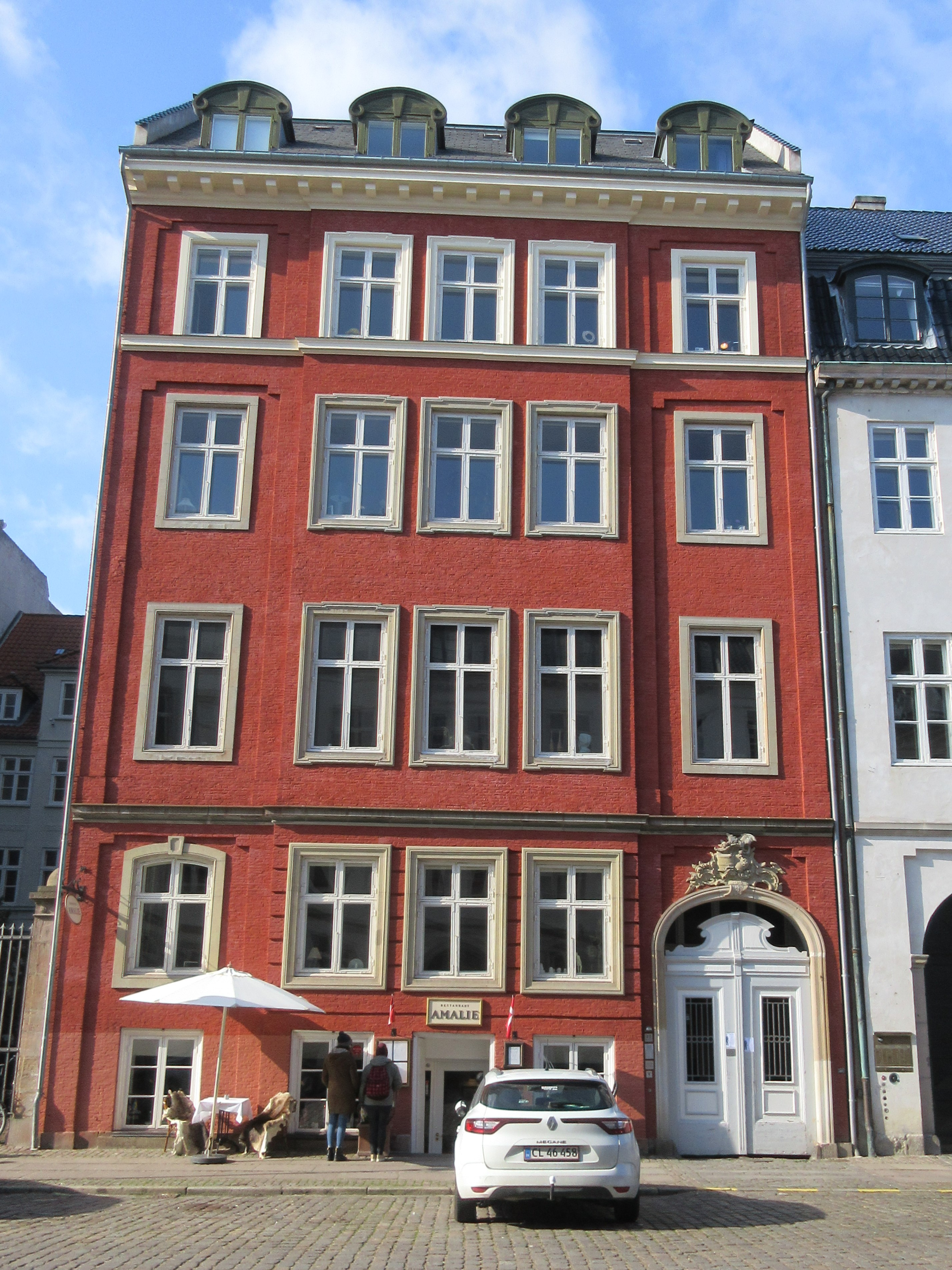
Amaliegade 11

Amaliegade 11 was originally constructed with a facade designed by Nicolai Eigtved in accordance with his own guidelines for the Frederiksstaden district. The mezzanine was in connection with Christesen's alterations in the 1870s replaced by a full third and fourth storey. The building is constructed in brick and stands on a granite plinth. It is rendered in a red colour with sandstone details. The five-bays wide building has a slightly projecting median risalit and the wide outer bays are flanked by lesenes. The cartouche above the gate dates from the construction of the building and features a barrel and a tub as a reference to the first owner's trade. The facade is finished by a modillioned cornice. The roof is clad with black tiles and features four arched dormer windows. A door in the gateway provides access to the building's principal staircase.

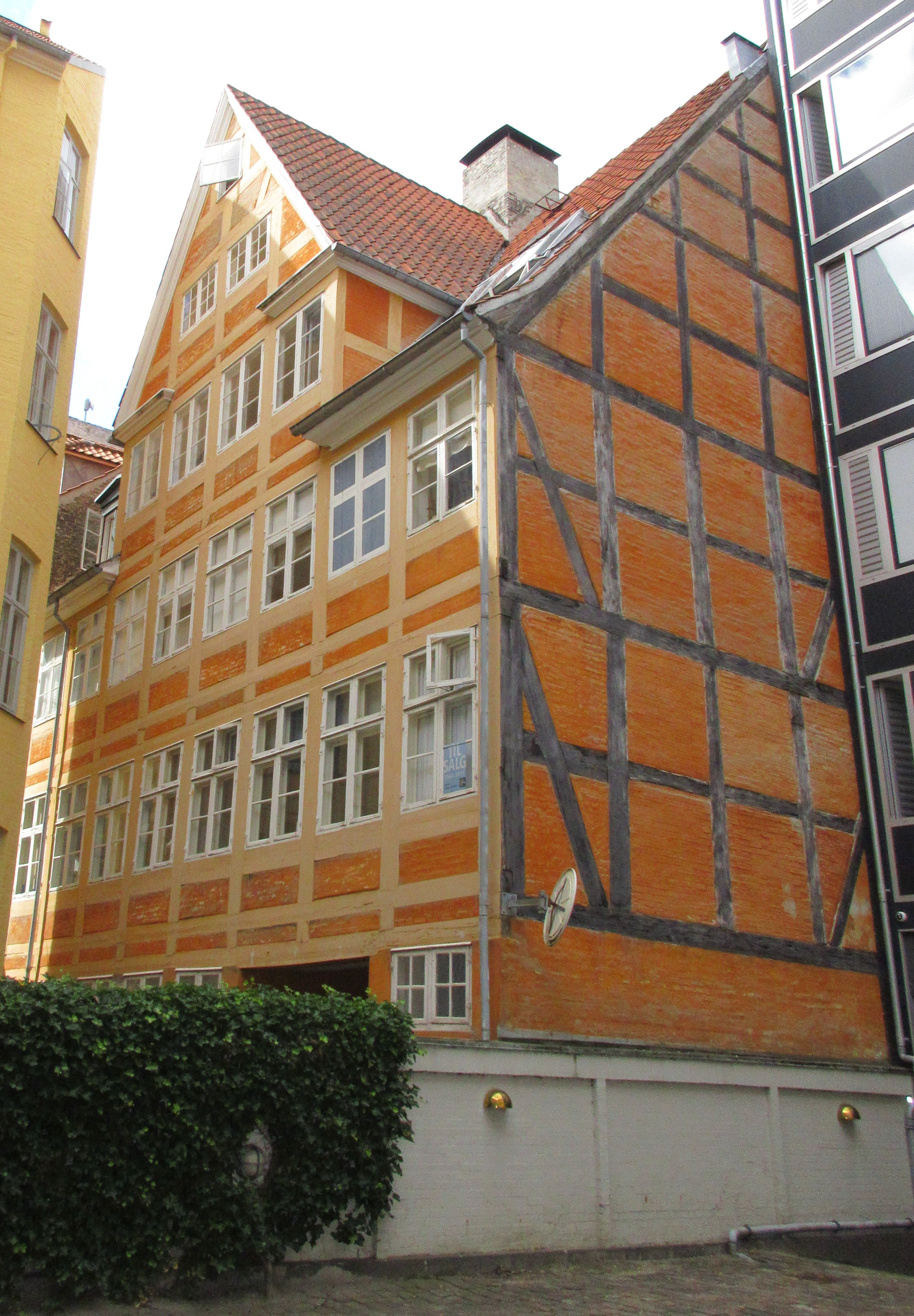
A peak of Amaliegade 11A from the courtyard of No. 13

The first of the three rear wings (1753) is a yellow-washed free-standing building, eight bays wide, in three storeys. It has a red tile roof with a three-astorey, through-going gabled wall dormer over the four central bays. The roof is pierced by a central chimney. A roof terrace has been created on each side of the chimney in modern time. The front side of the ground storey has been rebuilt in brick whereas its reart side is still constructed with timber framing. A two-bay passageway in the sixth and seventh bay of the building provides access to the second courtyard. A door in the passageway provides access to the building's main staircase.

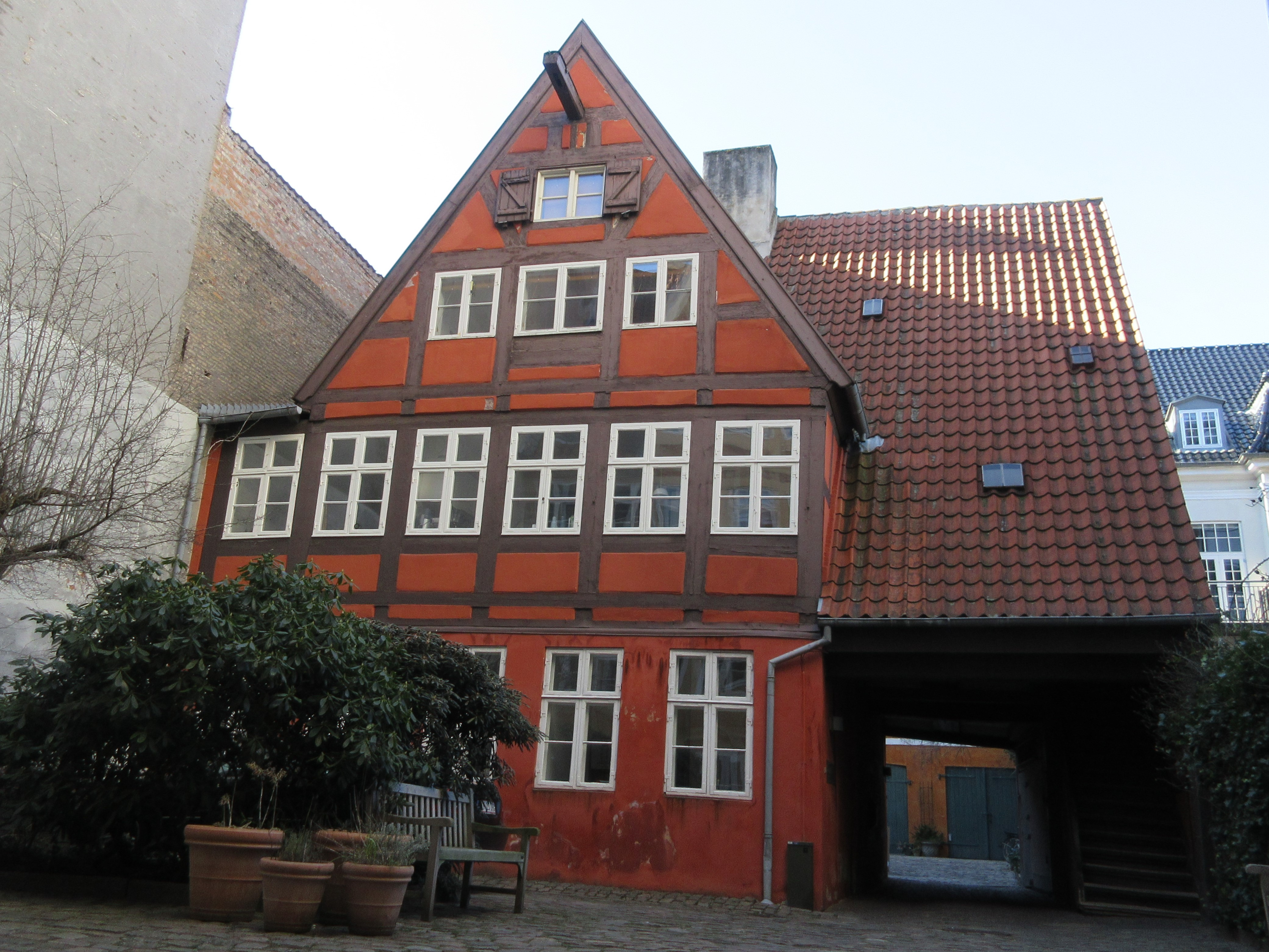
The gable of Amaliegade 11B seen from the courtyard of No. 13

The second rear wing (No. 11B, 1753) is constructed with brown-painted timber framing and red-washed infills. It consists of two storeys and a roof with a three-storey gabled wall dormer. It is eight bays wide towards the second courtyard and nine bays wide towards the third courtyard. The roof is clad with red tiles and is pierced by a substantial chimney.

The building fronting the street (No. 11) and the two first rear wings (No. 11A and No. 11B) were listed in the Danish registry of protected buildings and places in 1978. The last of the three rear wings is not part of the heritage listing.

== Today ==
The property has been converted into condominiums. The property is jointly owned by the owners of the individual condominiums through E/F Amaliegade 11. The two condominiums in Amaliegade 11B were in 2019 owned by DR journalist Nina Munch-Perrin and media personality Bubber.
