= Vilhelm Christesen =

Danish silversmith and goldsmith

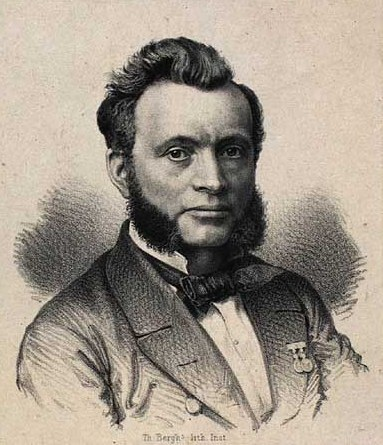
Vilhelm Christesen

Frederik Christian Vilhelm Christesen (4 July 1822 – 29 December 1899) was a Danish goldsmith and silversmith. His firm was from 1858 based at Amaliegade 11 in Copenhagen.

== Early life and education ==
Christesen was born on 4 July 1822 in Copenhagen, the son of helmsman Anders (or Hans) Christensen (1792-1828) and Vilhelmine Magdalene Augusta Grandjean (1796-1849). The mother moved the family to Slagelse following the father's death in 1825. Christesen was apprenticed to Jacob Kjølstrup in his new home town. On completing his apprenticeship in 1843, he travelled to Bremen as a journeyman to work for Wilkens & Salme.

== Career ==
In 1846, he returned to Slagelse and took over his old master's workshop. In 1856, he moved to Copenhagen where he was initially based at Løvstræde 122 (old number). In 1857, he obtained a license to start a silver and gold pressing factory. It was the first enterprise of its kind in the country and soon grew to considerable size. In 1858, he moved his enterprise to a building in the courtyard of Amaliegade 11. His products were initially sold through other gold smiths but in 1865 he opened his own shop. His business was mainly based on industrial mass production but his involvement in Kunstflidslotteriet (founded 1861) and the associated artists resulted in a number of precious show pieces for which he received recognition on a number of exhibitions in Denmark and abroad.

== Personal life ==
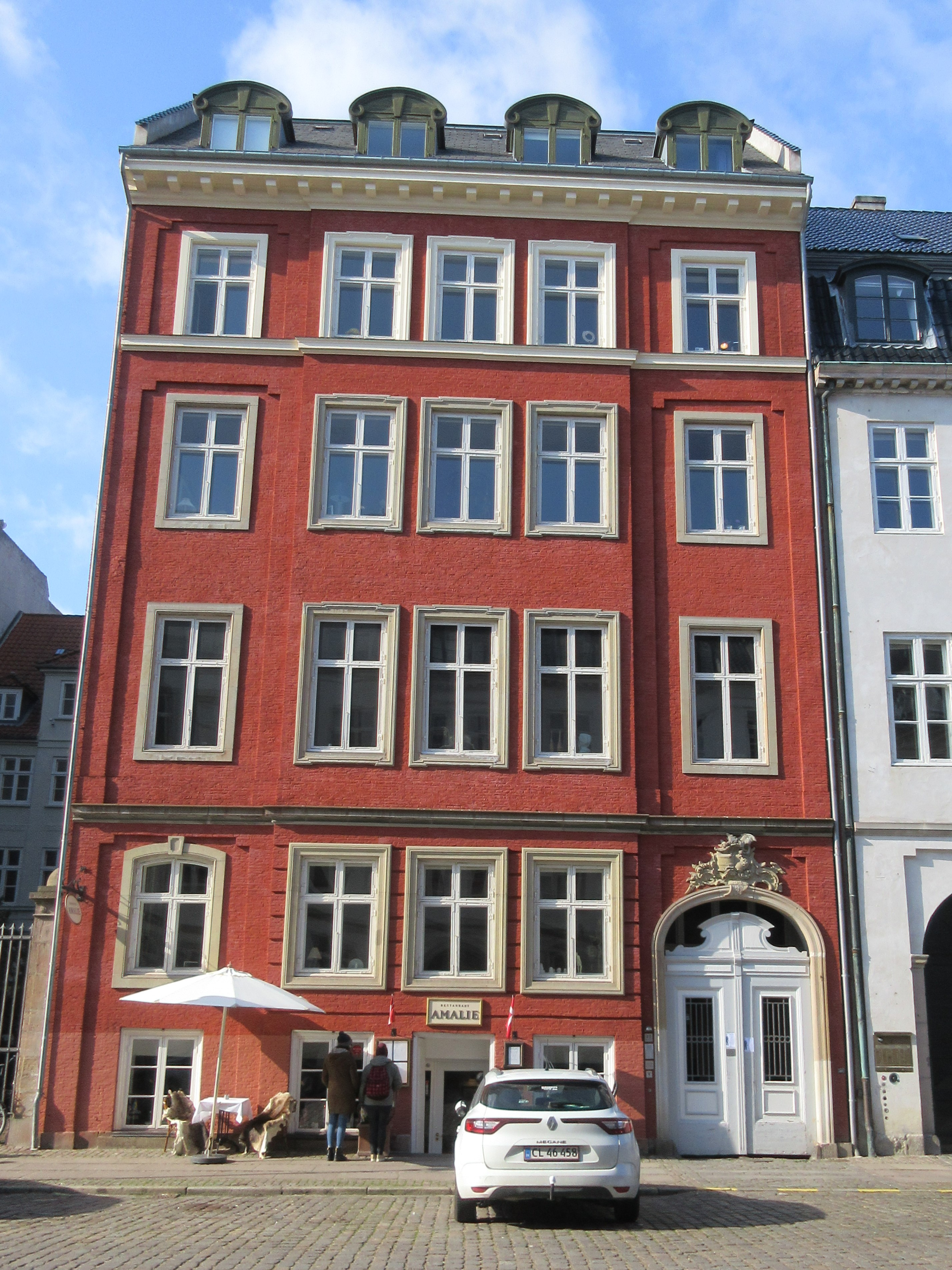
Christesen's building at Amaliegade 11 in Copenhagen.

Christesen was on 28 June 1846 in Bremen married to Luise Sophie Dorothea Pape (25 August 1825 - 10 August 1882). She was a daughter of mailman and former distiller Hermann Pape (1790-1838) and Dorothea Margarethe Plöger (1799-1865).

In 1874, Christesen purchased Amaliegade 11. He heightened the building facing the street to four storeys and constructed a short perpendicular side wing on its rear. He lived with his family in the apartment on the first floor. He died on 29 December 1899 and is buried in the Cemetery of Holmen.

== Legacy ==
Christesen's factory was internationally renowned for its 'Ancient Norse' style jewellery, copying archeological objects from the Bronze Age to the medieval period. The company's work was popular in England where it was copied by local goldsmiths.
