= Stormgade 6 =

Building in Copenhagen

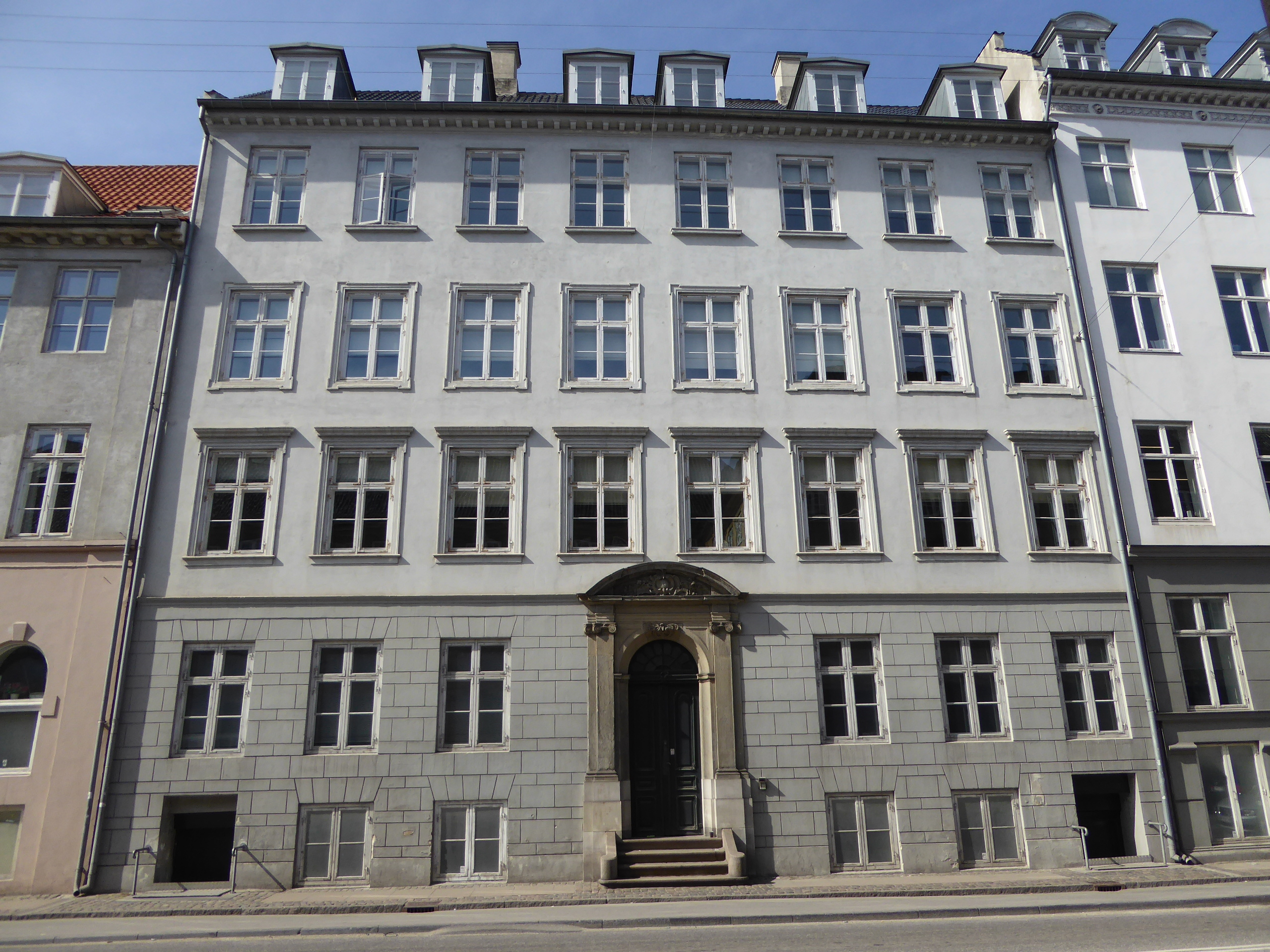
- Interactive map of the Stormgade 6 area

General information
- Location: Copenhagen, Denmark
- Coordinates: 55°40′31.15″N 12°34′29.6″E
- Completed: 1851

Stormgade 6 is a Neoclassical property situated at Stormgade 6 in Copenhagen, Denmark. It was constructed in 1850-1851 for portrait painter Johan Vilhelm Gertner. He resided in one of the apartments until his death in 1871. The buildingwas listed in the Danish registry of protected buildings and places in 1918. The building was listed in the Danish registry of protected buildings and places in 1918.

== History ==
=== 18th century ===
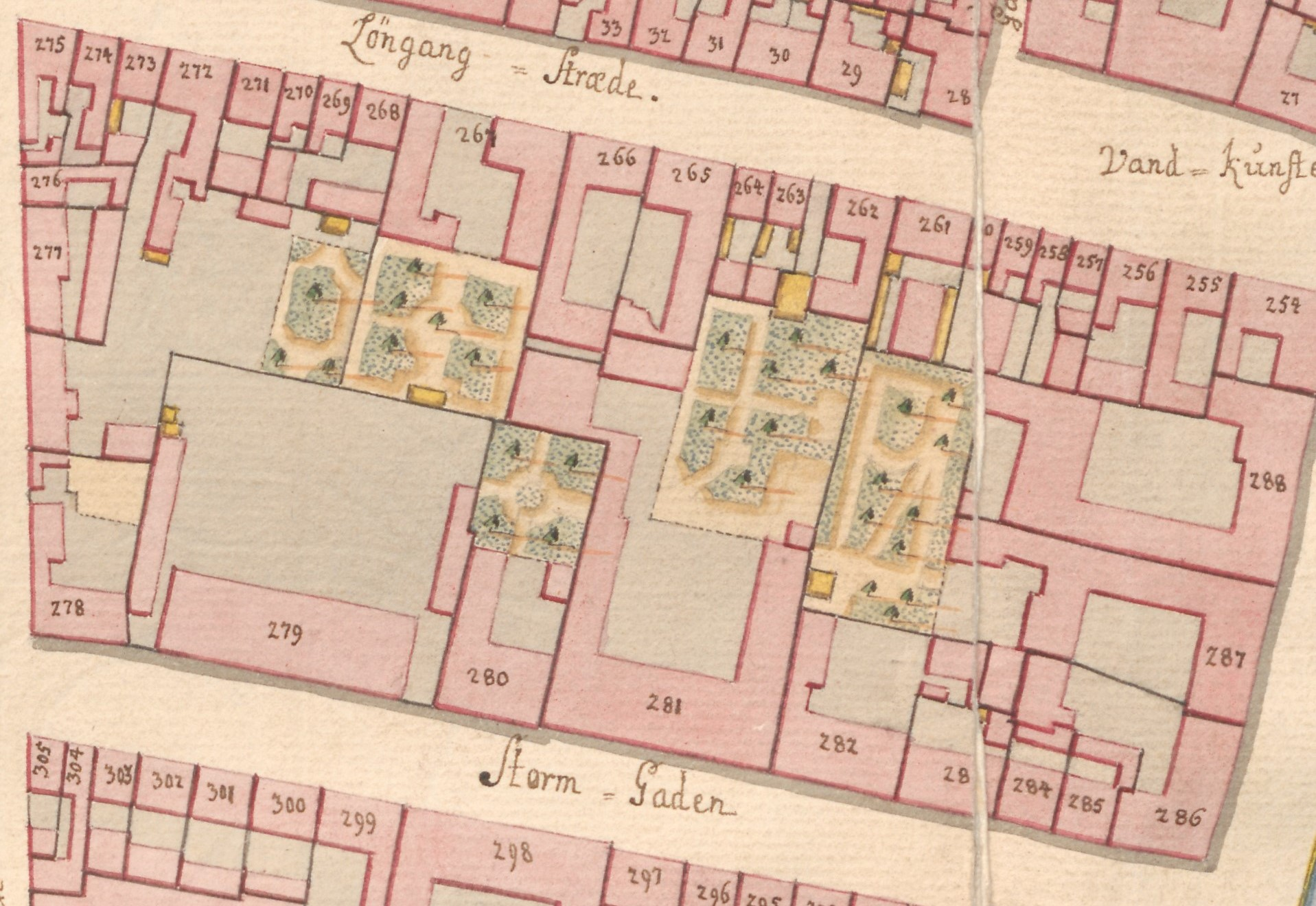
No. 183 seen on a detail from Christian Gedde's map of Copenhagen's West Quarter, 1757.

The site was formerly part the same property as Stormgade 4 and Stormgade 8. This large property was listed in Copenhagen's first cadastre of 1689 as No. 252 in the city's West Quarter (Vester Kvarter), owned by one lieutenant-colonel Robert.The property was later divided into three separate properties. The property now known as Stormgade 6 was listed in the new cadastre of 1756 as No. 283 in the West Quarter and belonged to justitsråd Gottfried Bruun at that time.

=== 19th century ===
The property was listed in the new cadastre of 1806 as No. 185 in the West Quarter. It was owned by the jurist and author Christian Frederik Jacobi at that time.

The present building on the site was constructed in 1850-1851 for portrait painter Johan Vilhelm Gertner. He lived in the building until his death in 1871. In 1860, he became a professor at the Royal Danish Academy of Fine Arts.

In 1852, Frederik Paludan-Müller (1809-1876) was among the residents.

The property was home to at least 34 trdofrmyd in three households at the time of the 1885 census. P. C. F. Andersen, a clothing retailer (manufakturhandler), resided on the first floor with his wife Marie Amalie Andersenm their five children (aged zero to 11) and three maids. J. N. Schalburg, a wine merchant, resided on the second floor with his wife B. Schalburgm their three children (aged zero to four) and three maids. Andreas Christian Schmidt, an office manager (kontorchef) in the Ministry of Defence, resided on the third floor with his wife Marie Schmidt , two sons (aged 25 and 27) and one maid.

=== 20th century ===
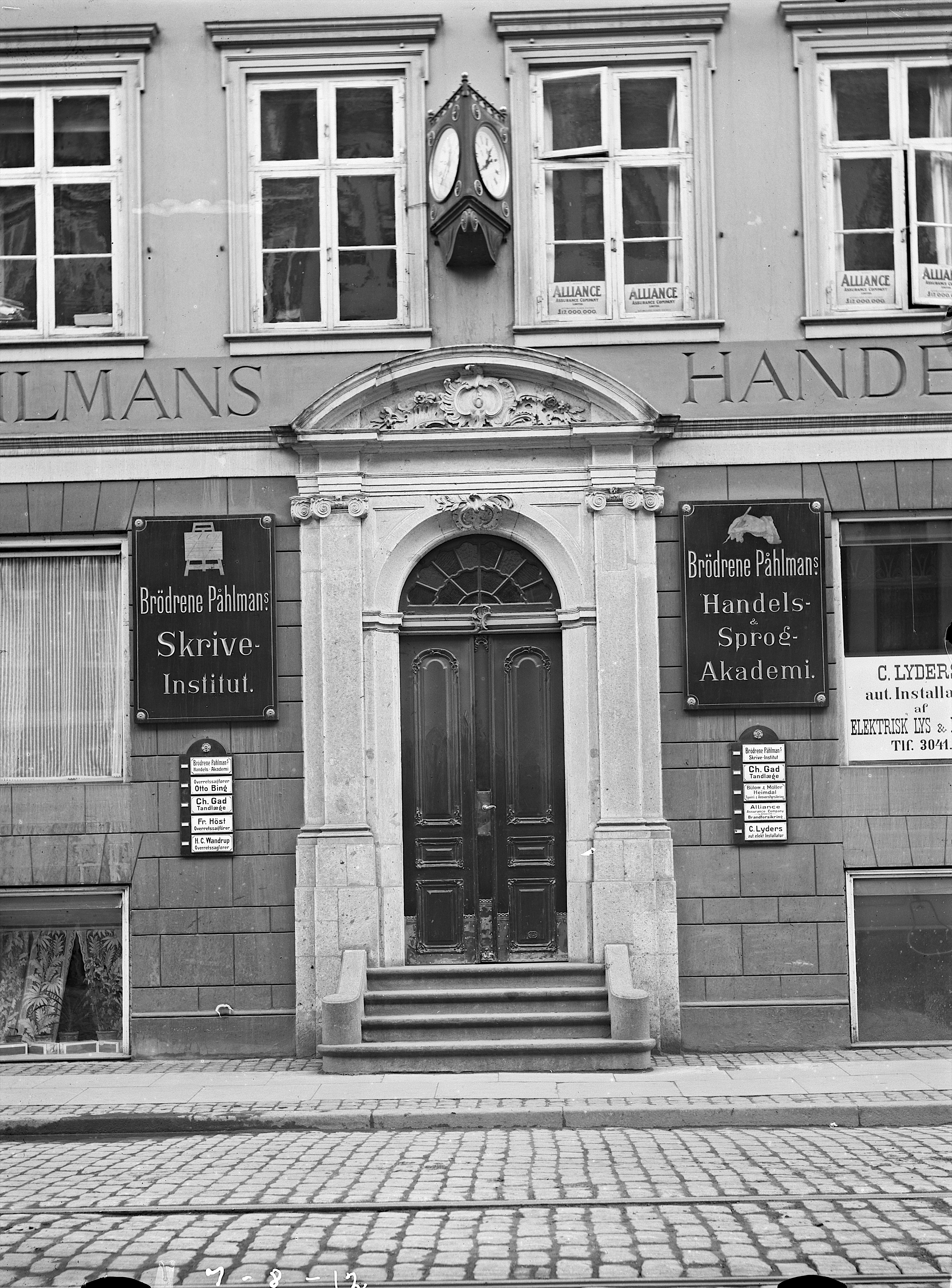
Stormgade 6 in 1912.6.

Brødrene Påhlman's Handels- og Sprogakademi and Brødrene Pålman's Skrive-Institut, two private educational institutions, were based in the building from around 1904 to at least 1015. They were both owned by Otto von Paahlman (1853-1915), who also had his home in the building. The other tenants (as of 1912) included Christian Gad's dental clinic and the lawyers Otto Bing, Frederik Høst and H. C. Eandrup as well as the insurance companies Bülow & Möller (Geimdal) and Alliance.

In 1931, Stormgade 6 was acquired by the insurance company Nye Danske and incorporated in its headquarters at No. 2–4.

== Architecture ==
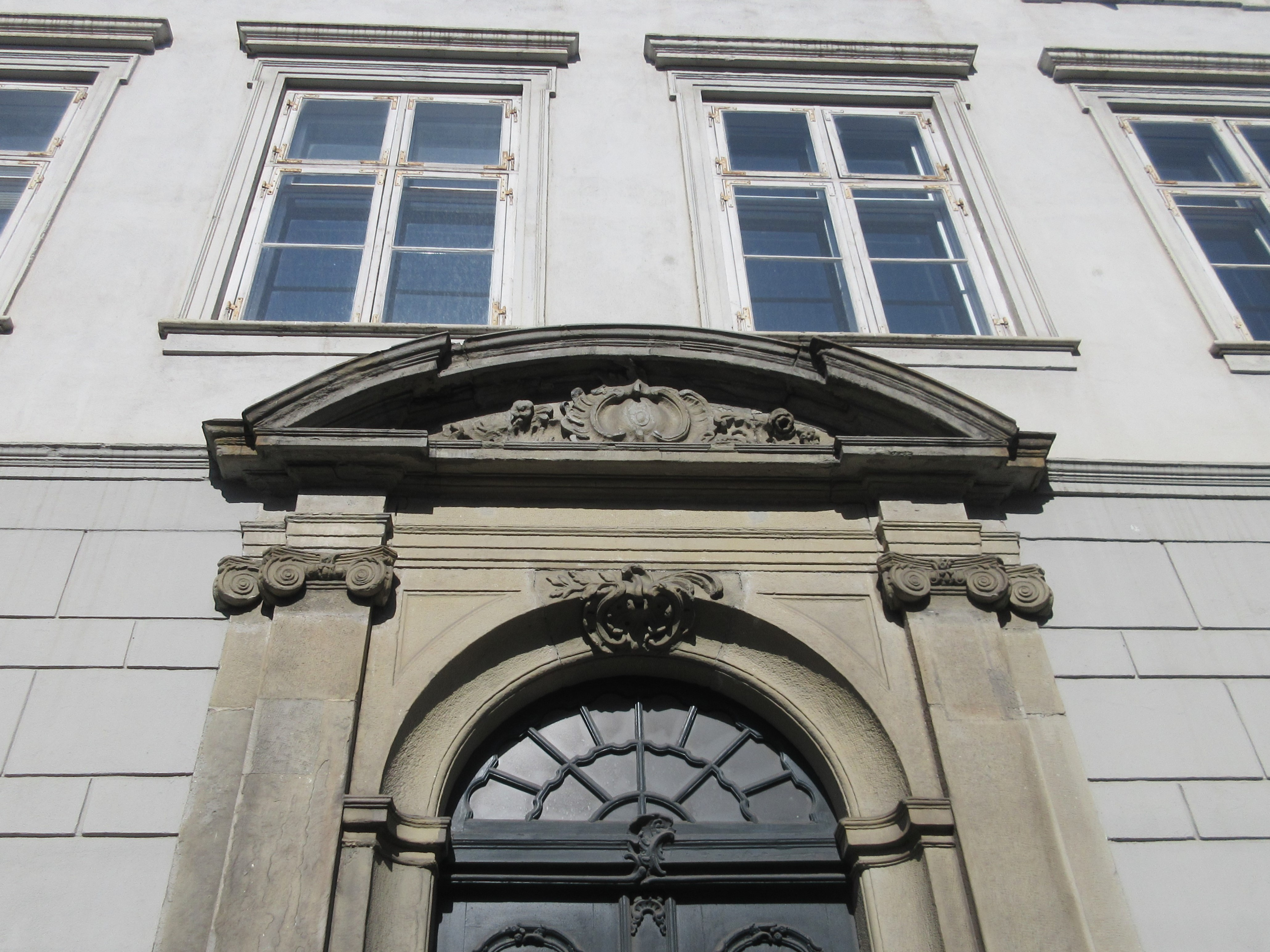
Detail of the door

Stormgade 6 is constructed in brick with four storeys above a walk-out basement. The seven-bays-wide facade is plastered and grey-painted. The ground floor is finished with shadow jouints and painted in a slightly darker grey colour than the three upper floors. The portal that adorm the main entrance in the central bay dates from 1755 and was reused from the previous building on the site. The main entrance is flanked by basement entrances in the two outer bays. The facade is finished by a dentillated cornice. The first-floor windows are topped by hood moulds and the third-floor windows are accented with sills. The roof features seven dormer windows. The building was listed in the Danish registry of protected buildings and places in 1918.

== Today ==
Storm 2–6 is now owned by Bygningsstyrelsen.
