= Højbro Plads 6 =

Building in Copenhagen, Denmark

Holm House
- Holms Grd
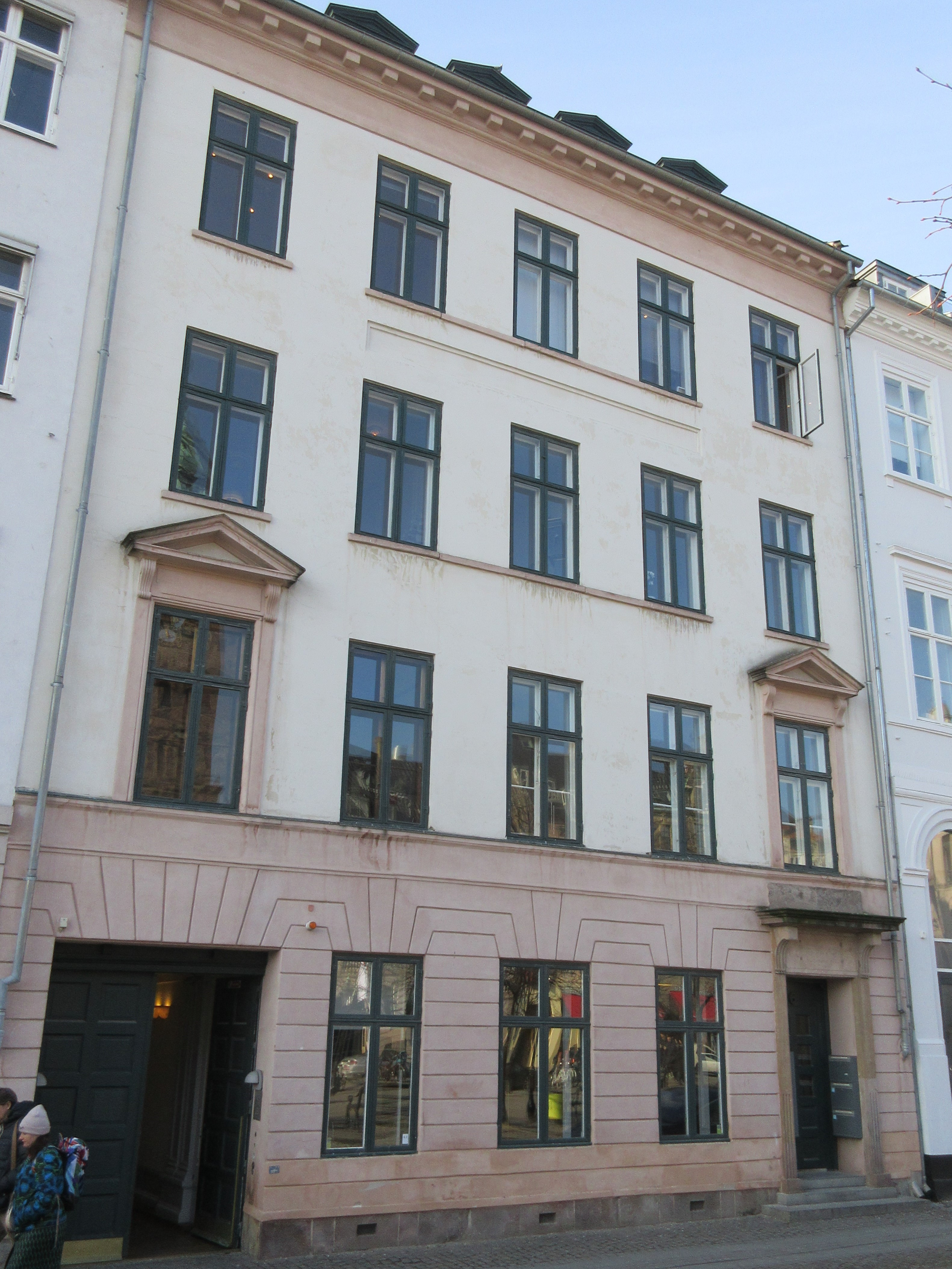

General information
- Architectural style: Neoclassical
- Location: Copenhagen, Denmark
- Coordinates: 55°40′41.66″N 12°34′46.09″E
- Completed: 1806
- Client: Hinrich Ladiges

Design and construction
- Architect: Niels Schønberg Kurtzhals

Højbro Plads 6 is a listed property located on Højbro Plads in the Old Town of Copenhagen, Denmark. It was listed in the Danish registry of protected buildings and places in 1918.

== History ==
=== 18th century ===
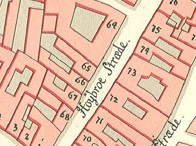
No. 65 and No. 66 seen on a detail from Christian Gedde's map of Strand Quarter, 1756.

The site was formerly made up of two separate properties in the relatively narrow street Højbrostræde. The northern of these properties was listed in Copenhagen's first cadastre of 1689 as No. 64 in Strand Quarter and belonged to sugar-baker Henrik Schrøder. The southern property was listed as No. 65 and belonged to hofstafferer Bernt Tham. The old No. 64 was listed in the new cadastre of 1756 as No. 65 and belonged to wine retailor (vintapper) Frederik Daniel de Piloi. The old No. 65 was listed as No. 66 and belonged to merchant (kræmmer) Lars Lerche.

The property No. 65 was owned by hatter Johan Christ.Viertel at the time of the 1787 census. He resided on his property with his wife Maria Magdalena Jacobine Viertel, their three children (aged eight to 16), his mother-in-law Johanna Rachel Douilhac, two maids, a boy, a caretaker and two lodgers. The property No. 66 was home to 17 residents in two households. Heiman Joseph, a guldtrækker, resided in the building with his wife Judithe Joseph, their three children (aged 22 to 28), the eldest son Phillip Heiman Joseph's wife Helle Phillip, their four children (aged one to five) and three maids. Chresten Nielsen, a pottery seller, resided in the building with his wife Elisabeth Nielsen, their 11-year-old daughter and a 77-year-old widow.

=== Henrichsen and the new building ===
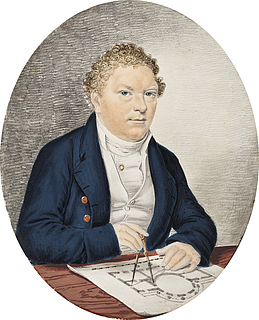
Niels Schønberg Kurtzhals

The two properties were both destroyed in the Copenhagen Fire of 1795, together with most of the other buildings in the area. After the fire, it was decided to replace the densely built-up block on the other side of Højbrostræde with a new square, Højbro Plads, which would act as a fire belt, a decision that gave the two properties a much more visible location. They were subsequently merged into a single property, The present building on the site was constructed by master builder Niels Schønberg Kurtzhals for textile merchant Lorentz Andreas Hinrichsen in 1804–]06.

The property was listed in the new cadastre of 1806 as No. 52 in Strand Quarter. It was still owned by merchant Andreas L. Henriksen at that time.

Henrichsen was married to Marie Christine Wolff (1776-1830) and they had five children, two sons and three daughters, by the time that the building was completed. They later had three more children of which one, a daughter, died as an infant. Lorentz Andreas Hinrichsen died in 1824.

=== Trier and Goldschmidt ===
The property was some time later acquired by the Jewish wholesale merchant Levin Seligmann Trier (1774-1823). He and his family resided on the second floor. His wife Jacobine Trier was the daughter of another wealthy Jewish merchant, Moses Melchior (1736-1812), founder of Moses & Søn G. Melchior. Their ten children included the later businessmen Seligmann L. Trier (1802-1881) and Marcus (Martin) Trier (owner of S. L. Trier & Co). Hirsch Jacob Goldschmidt (1781-1829), another Jewish merchant, resided on the first floor. He was married to Rose Gerson (1795-1896), daughter of Heyman Gerson (1766-1832). The lawyer Christian Wilhelm Haagen (1792-1871) resided in the third-floor apartment from 1820. He was the son of Hans Haagen, Copenhagen's Chief of Police. He had just married Elise Agatha Ketty Agathe Kitte Kornerup (1798-1878), daughter of justitsråd Christian Julius Kornerup (1876-1851). In 1822. Haagen and his wife moved to an apartment at Frederiksberggade 4.

=== Hans Nicolay von Bülow ===
The property was later acquired by Hans Nicolay von Bülow (1798-1848), a senior clerk (fuldmægtig) in the city's administration, His property was home to 26 residents in four households at the time of the 1840 census. The owner resided on the second floor with his wife Jensine Andrea Kragm their two daughters (aged one and nine), the aunt Hansine Magrethe Schjøth and two maids. Ludvig Borrebye, a silk and textile merchant, resided on the ground floor with his wife Ane Cathrine Møller, a textile merchant (employee), two apprentices and one lodger. Michael Henriques (1793-1854), a Jewish merchant (grosserer), resided on the first floor with his wife Emilie Henriques (née von Halle), their sons Woæheæ and Ludvig Henriques, one male servant and one maid. Georg Herman Monrad (1794-1876), director of the Royal Danish Mail, resided on the third floor with his wife Sally Dorothea Louise Waltersdorff, two sisters-in-law, a nephew, one male servant and one maid.

Hans Nicolay von Bülow died in 1843. His widow Jensine Andrea Krag (1802-1877) was the owner of the property in 1845. She resided on the second floor until at least the 1860 census. Borreby and Hansen were also still residing on the two lower floors at that time.

Johan Jacob Georg Lund, a royal physician, resided on the third floor at the time of the 1845 census. He lived there with his wife Augusta Charlothe Sabine Heilmannm his mother Maja Elisa Schartau and three maids.

Sally Friedlænder, who owned a bookshop and stationery in Pilestræde, resided on the second floor at the time of the 1850 census. He lived there with his wife Betzy Friedlænder, their five children (aged two to eight), his sister-in-law Rosalia Bloch, one male servant and three maids. Friedlænder and his wife resided in the second floor apartment until at least the 1860 census.

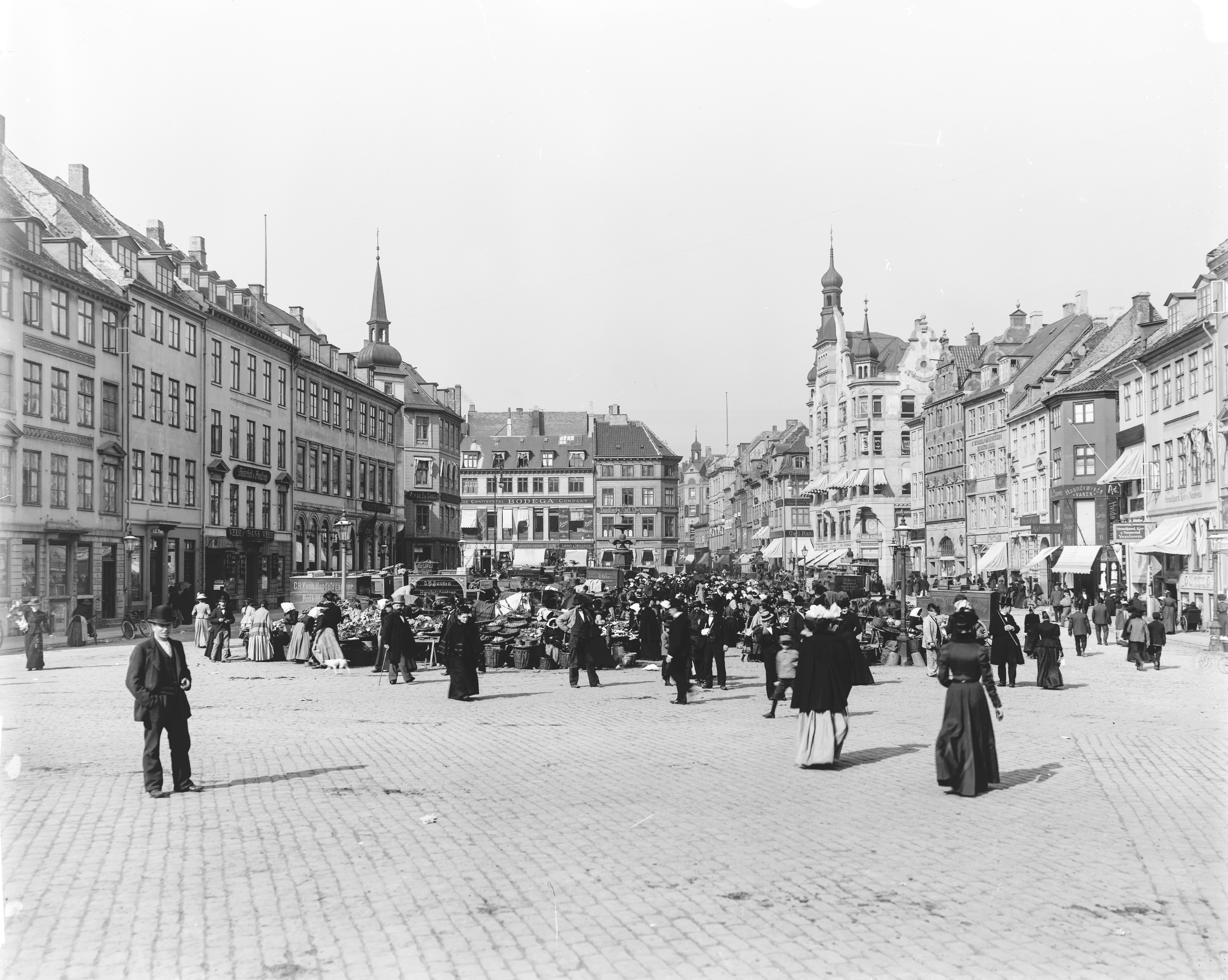
The building visible to the left on a photograph by Frederik Riise.

The property was home to 31 residents at the time of the 1860 census. Mads Thomas Westjeke, a new silk and textile merchant, resided on the ground floor. The three upper floors were as mentioned still occupied by the Hansen's, Bülow's and Friedlænger's. Griedlænder's wife had died in 1859. He had subsequentlymarried her sister. His daughter Thea would later marry Louis Meyer, another Jewish businessman who owned the property around the corner at Læderstræde 11. Martine Marie Christine Lapsto, a widow, resided on the second floor of the rear wing with one maid at the time of the 1860 census. Martine Marie Christine Capito, another widow, resided on the second floor of the rear wing with one maid. Carsten Friis Jespersen, a district physician, resided on the second floor of the side wing.

=== 20th century ===
Brødr. Trierm a brokerage firm, was based in the building in 1950. The firm was founded in 1877 by Theodor Trier (1853-1927) and Louis Trier (1855-1919). As of 1950, it was owned by Ludvig Trier (1886-), Carl Christensen (1892-) and Ole Mauritzen (1916-).

== Architecture ==
The building is four storeys high and five bays wide. The outer windows on the first floor are topped by triangular pediments. A depression indicates that a frieze was originally located above the windows of the second floor.

== Gallery ==
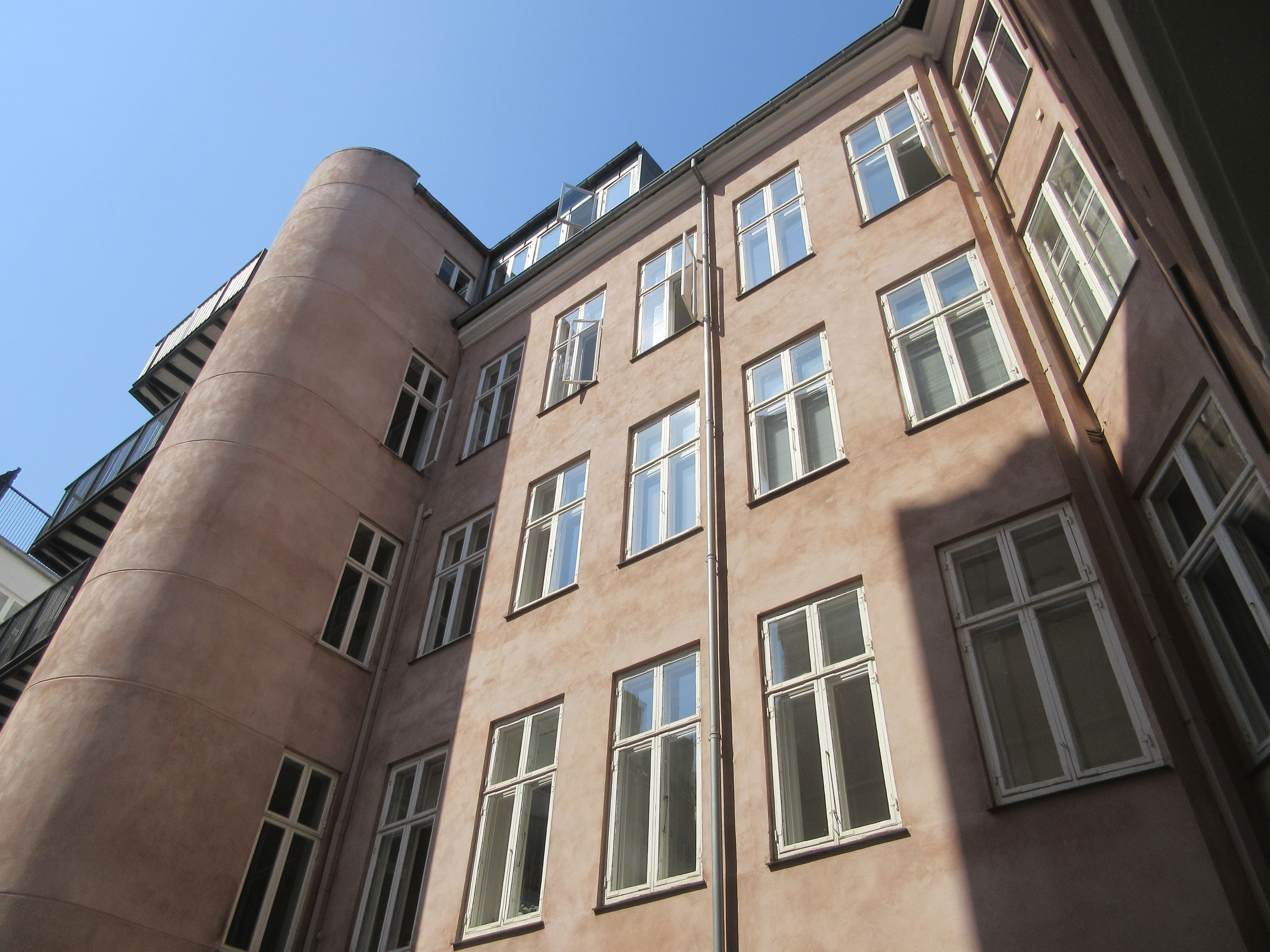
The side wing viewed from the gate.

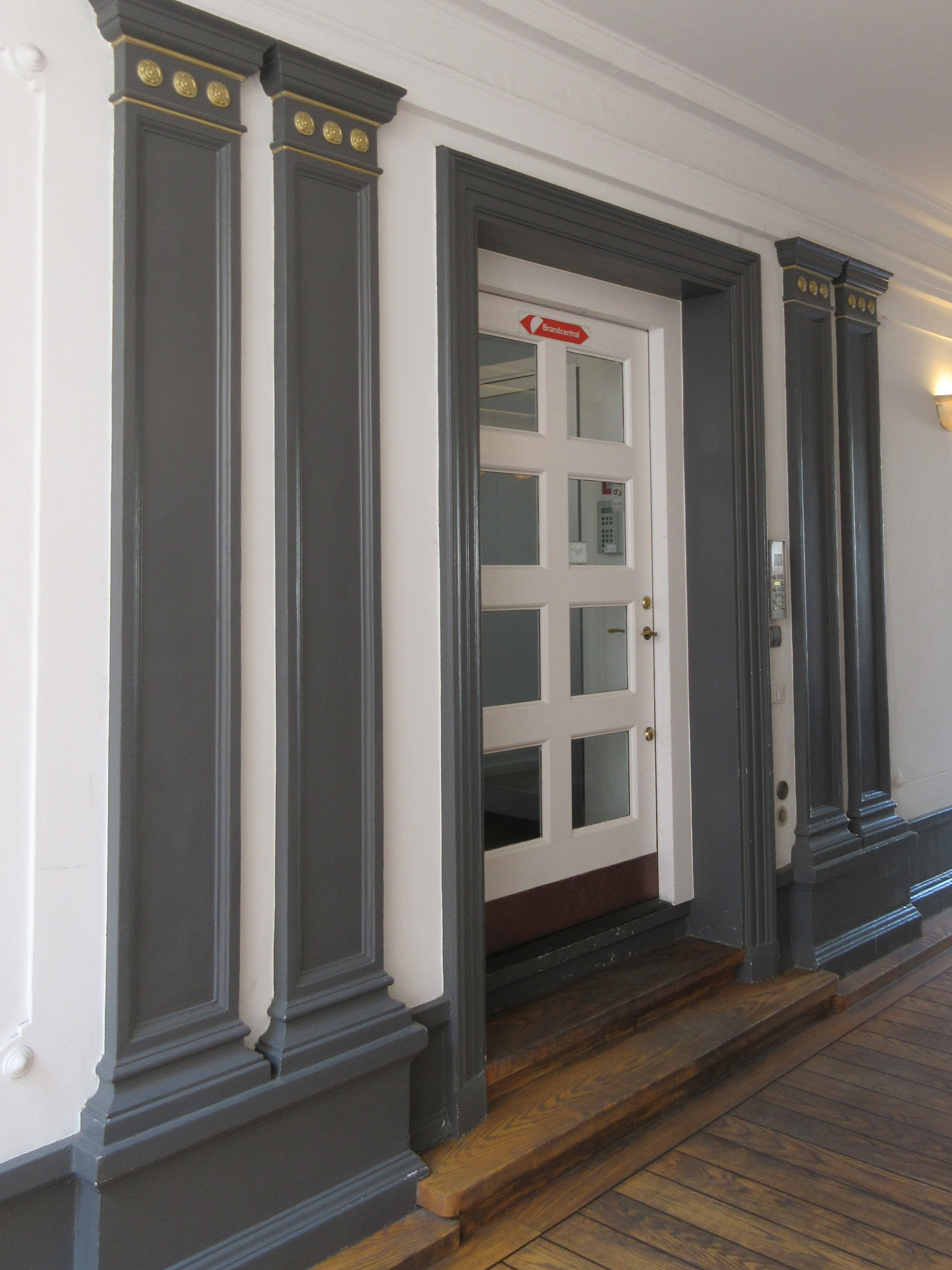

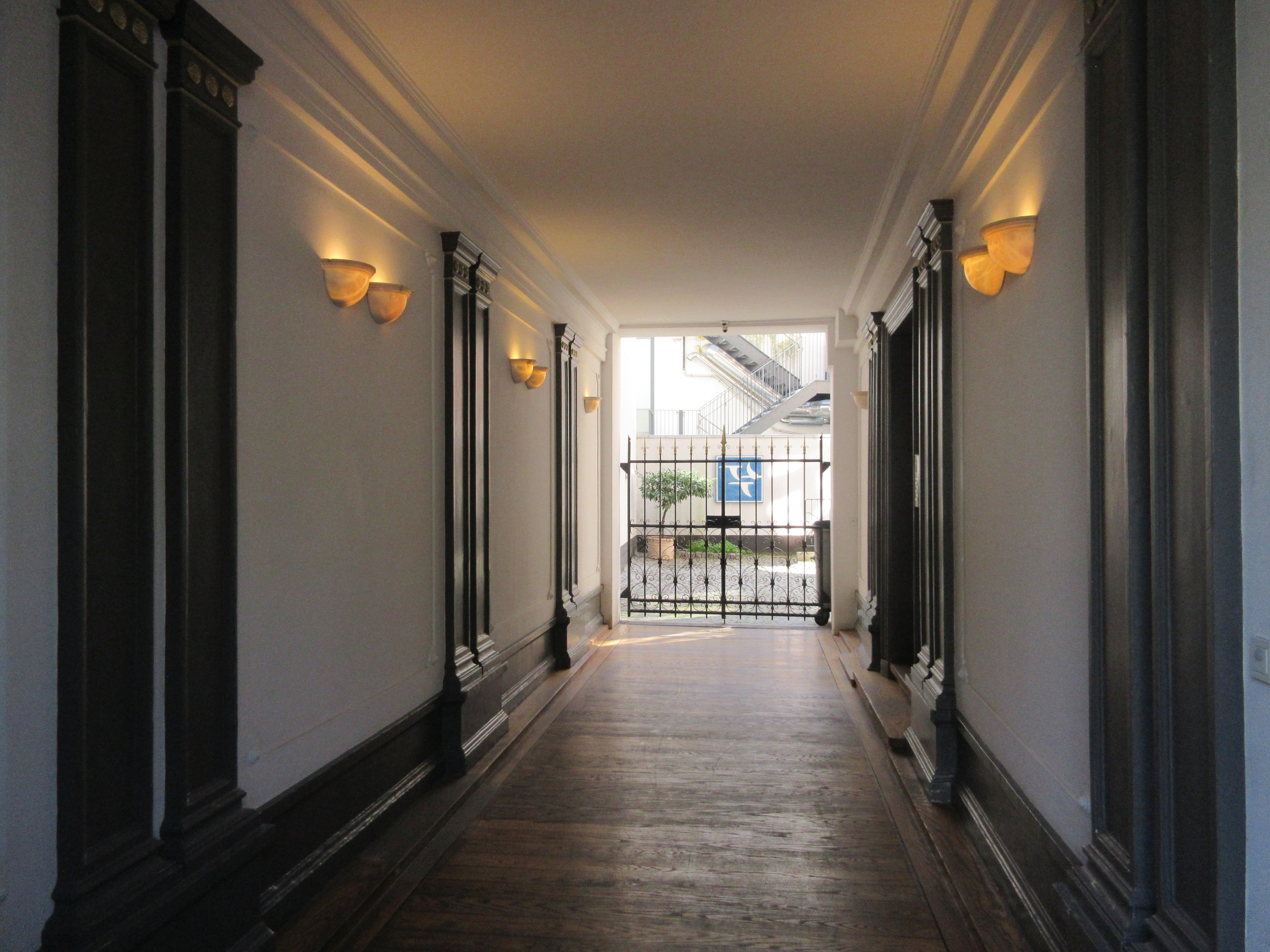
The gateway, view towards the yard.
