= Fiolstræde 20 =

Listed building in Copenhagen

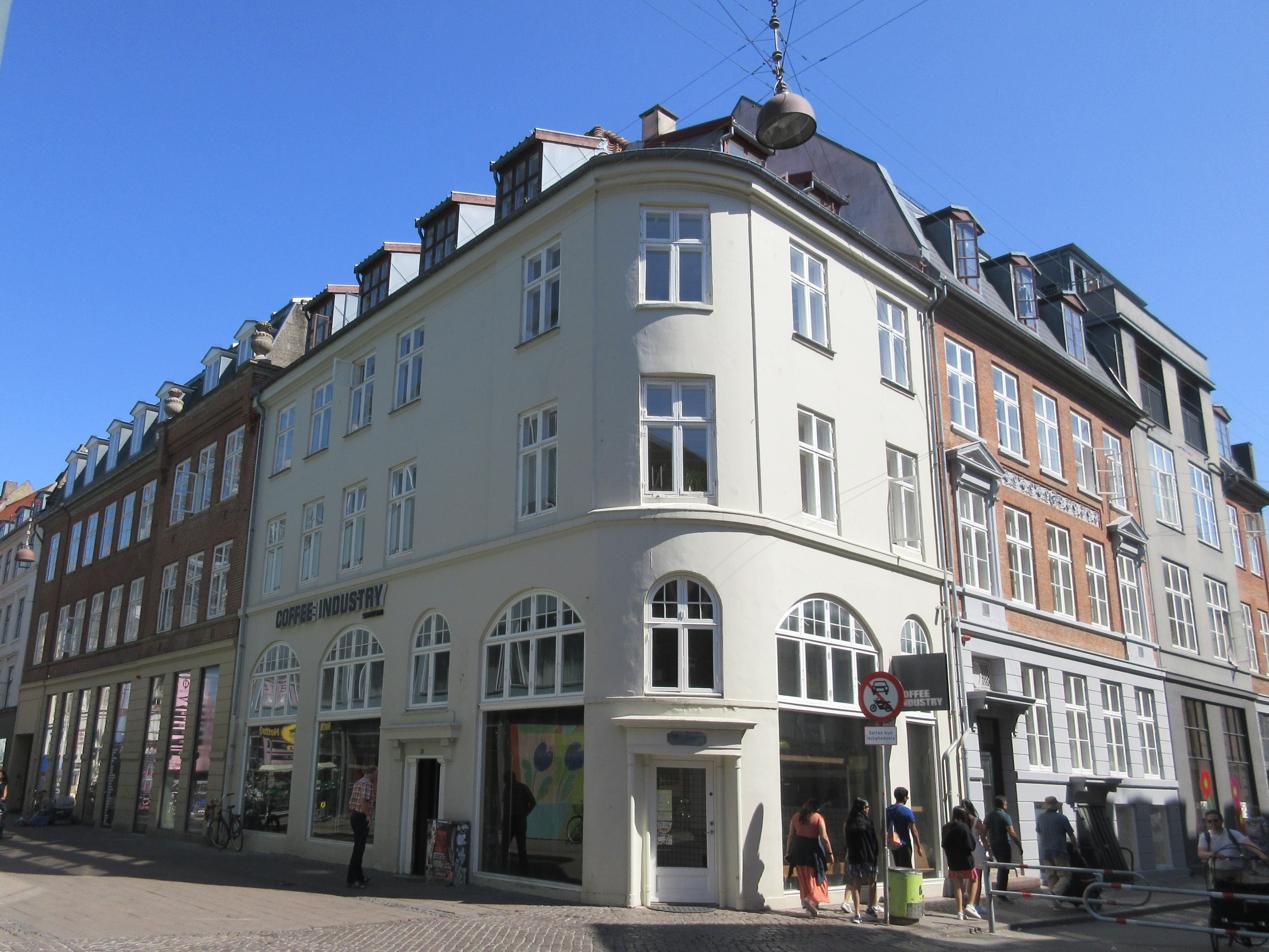
- Interactive map of the Fiolstræde 20 area

General information
- Architectural style: Neoclassical
- Location: Copenhagen, Denmark
- Coordinates: 55°40′52.43″N 12°34′22.01″E
- Completed: 1811

Design and construction
- Architect: Niels Schønberg Kurtzhals

Fiolstræde 20 is a Neoclassical building situated at the corner of Fiolstræde and Krystalgade in the Old Town of Copenhagen, Denmark. Constructed by Niels Schønberg Kurtzhals for grocer Jens Christopher Friborg in 1810–11, it is now part of a larger complex of buildings comprising Fiolstræde 20–24 and Krystalgade 14–16. Fiolstræde 20 and Krystalgade 16 were jointly listed in the Danish registry of protected buildings and places in 1951. The current owner of the complex is Lægernes Pension, a pension fund for medical doctors in Denmark.

== History ==
=== 18th century ===
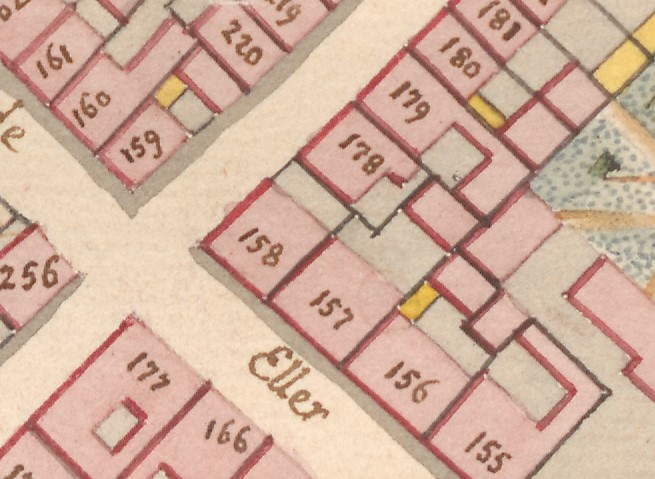
No. 158 seen on a detail from Gedde's district map of Klædebo Quarter, 1757.

The property was listed in Copenhagen's first cadastre of 1689 as No. 184 in Klædebo Quarter, owned by miller Niels Cornelisen. The property was listed in the new cadastre of 1756 as No. 158 and belonged to grocer (urtekræmmer) Didrich Kühlman.

=== Johan Christoffer Friborg ===
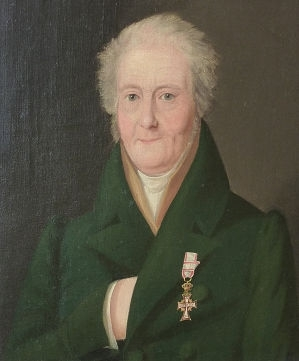
Jens Christopher Friborg

The property was later acquired by grocer (urtekræmmer) Johan Christoffer Friborg (1747-1838) in 1873. His wife Sophie Margrethe Horn (1757-1816) was the daughter of archivist at Rentekammeret Hans Jochum Horn (1729-1781).

Friborg was alderman of the Grocers' Guild (Urtekræmmerlauget) in 1794–1805, a member of the Council of 32 Men in 1798–1831, director of the city's Poor Authority (Fattigvæsnet) in 1798–1816, a trustee (kommitteret) of the Copenhagen Fire Insurance Fund in 1795–1838, superintendent (kirkeværge) of the Church of Our Lady in 1795-1834 and an infantry captain in the Civil Guard in 1801–08.

Friborg's property was home to 15 residents at the 1787 census. The 40-year-old owner resided on the ground floor with his wife Magrethe Sophie (née Horn), their four children (aged three to nine), one lodger (Johan Christian Bentzen, aged seven), two apprentices and three maids. Egert C. S. Randrup, a 23-year-old student, resided alone on the first floor. Kari Ivarsdatter Horn (née Bachevold, 1724–1807), Friborg's mother-in-law, resided on the second floor with one maid.

The property was home to 24 residents in four households at the 1801 census. Friborg resided in the building with his wife, their seven children (aged six to 22), his mother-in-law Karen Bachevold Horn, one employee in his grocery business and three maids. His widowed sister Frideriche Cecilie Friborg resided in the building with three lodgers. Cecilie Bonsach Schau (née Friborg), another widowed sister, resided in the building with one lodger and one maid. Daniel Blechingberg, a clerk (kopist), resided in the building with his wife Sophia Ambrosius Lous, their two-year-old son and one maid.

Friborg's property was listed as No. 68 in the new cadastre of 1806. It was destroyed during the British bombardment of Copenhagen in 1807. Being a captain in the Civil Guard, Friborg took part in the defence of the city during the attack and was therefore not at home when the building was destroyed. Friborg was soon after the incident able to reopen his business in temporary premises on Købmagergade. In 1810–11, he was able to construct a new building on his property to designs by master mason Niels Schønberg Kurtzhals. On its completion, he chose initially to rent out the shop premises to focus on his responsibilities in conjunction with the rebuilding of the Church of Our Lady. He lived in his building until his death in 1838. His first wife had died in 1806. On 5 April 1819, he was second time married to Anna Margrethe Staal (1753–1832). Her parents were dyer Hans Staal (1717–65) and Malene Dorthe Henrichsen. Her first husband was Jens Schultz (died 3 March 1818). His brewery was located at No. 167 in the city's North Quarter (now Nørre Voldgade 80–82.

=== Lorenz Schultz ===
After Friborg's death, the property was passed to Lorenz Schultz, possibly a son from his second wife's first marriage. He continued the grocery business (as urtekræmmer). His property was home to 20 residents in three households at the 1840 census. Lorentz Schultz, a grocer (urtelræmmer), resided on the second floor with his wife Sophie Schultz (née Bernstein), one employee in his grocery business and one lodger (theology student). Elisabeth Hagen (née Hall), widow of a ship captain, resided on the first floor with her three children (aged 20 to 25), her mother Maria Hall (née Phytzner), three lodgers (theology students) and one maid. Niels Christian Bjørn, a captain in the King's Regiment, resided on the ground floor with his wife Gustave Valentin and their five children (aged nine to 23).

Schultz's property was home to 18 residents in four households at the 1850 census. Oluf B. Olafsen, a grocer (urtekræmmer), resided on the ground floor with his housekeeper, two lodgers, an employee in his grocery business and one maid. Caroline Henriette Cöln (née Hendrichsen, 1784–1851), widow of kammerråd Ludvig Georg Cöln (1770-1842), resided on the first floor with her daughter Georgine Henriette Cöln and son Peter Vomdraw Cöla, one maid, music teacher Francius Catalono and the music teacher's wife Sophie Catalono. The retired owner Lorenze Schultz resided on the second floor with his wife and two female lodgers (aged 50 and 52). Carl Edvard Jacobsen, a brush binder, resided on the ground floor of the rear wing with his wife Sine Grøn.

=== 1860 census ===
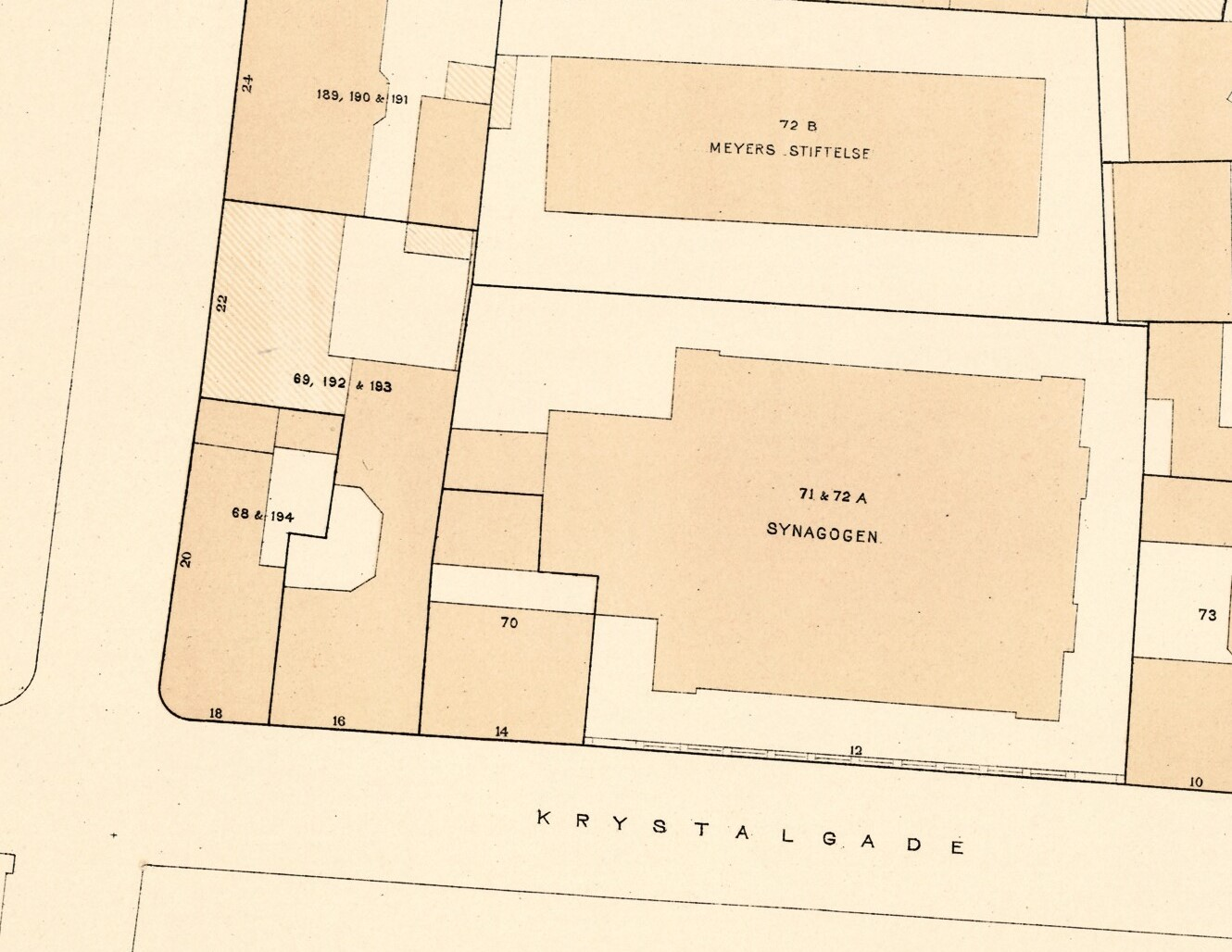
The property seen in a detail from one of Berggreen's block plans of Læødebo Quarter, 1886-88.

No. 68/194/ 18 was home to 24 residents at the 1860 census. Søren Munck Plum, a former ship captain, resided on the ground floor with his wife Karen Froberg, two maids and two lodgers. Frantz Daniel Joachim Michaelsen, a language teacher, resided on the first floor with his wife Sara (née Sackmann), his mother-in-law Frederikke Sackmann (née Been), one maid and three lodgers (students). Andreas Johan Jensen, a 71-year-old man with a royal pension, resided on the second floor with his wife Karen Christine (née Bentzen), their daughter Julie Andrea Jensen, the former owner's widow Sophie Schultz (née Bentzen) and two lodgers. Anna Christiane Klak (née Hendriksen), a widow employed with needlework, resided on the third floor with the 37-year-old widow Marie Wirkmeyer f. Schubak and the 39-year-old divorced woman Marie Stale (née Kulmer). Henrik August Møller, a grocer (urtekræmmer), resided in the basement with the apprentice Frederik Waldemar Thomsen.

=== 20th and 21st centuries ===
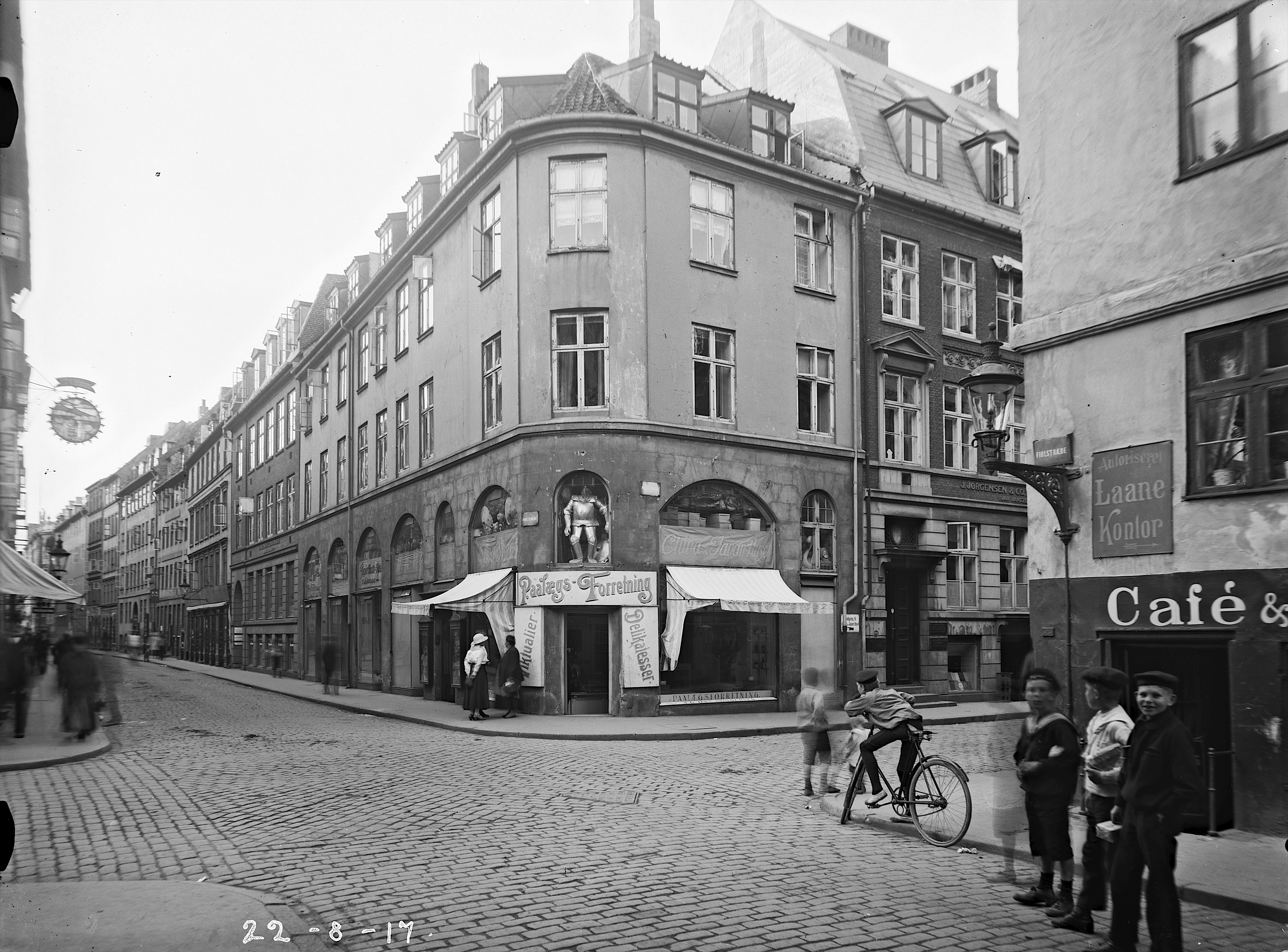
The building in 1917.

In 1911, No. 68 & 194 was merged with No. 69, 192 & 193. In 1934, No. 69, 192 & 193 was merged with No. 70. Fiolstræde 20 and Krystalgade 16 were jointly listed in the Danish registry of protected buildings and places in 1951.

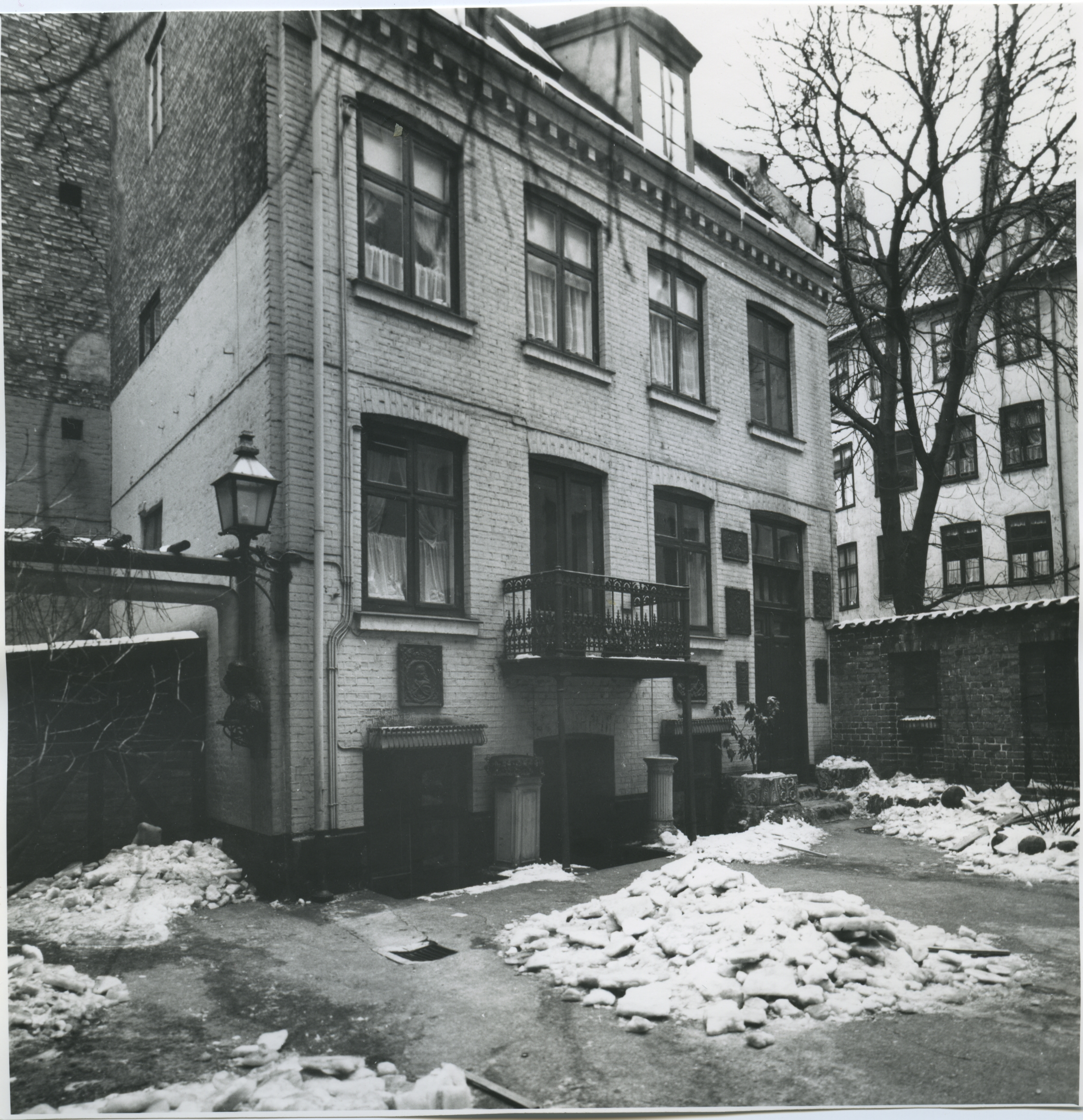
The rear wing photographed by Mogens Galk-Sørensen in 1966..

The complex has later been used by the University of Copenhagen for administrative and educational purposes.

In 2013, Freja Ejendomme sold the property to TT Partners. The complex was subsequently put through a comprehensive renovation in 2014–15. In 2016, it was sold to Lægernes Pension.

== Architecture ==
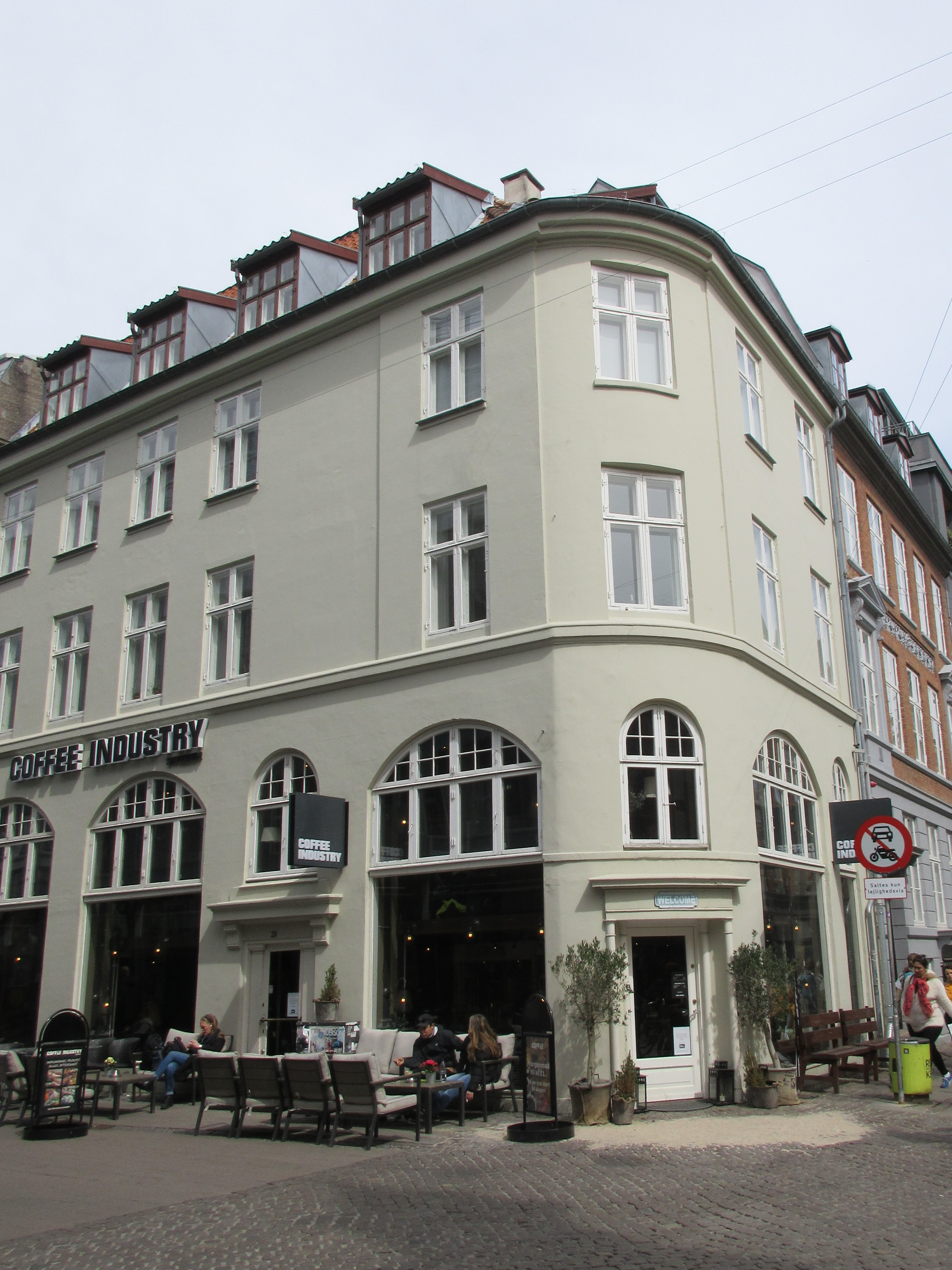
Fiolstræde 20.

The corner building is constructed with three storeys over a walk-out basement. It has a six-bays-long facade on Fiolstræde, a two-bays long facade on Krystalgade and a bow-shaped corner. The latter was an alternative to the chamfered corners which were dictated for all corner buildings by Jørgen Henrich Rawert's and Peter Meyn's guidelines for the rebuilding of the city after the fire so that the fire department's long ladder companies could navigate the streets more easily.

== Today ==
The building complex

Fiolstræde 20–24/Krystalgade 14–16 has a total floor area of 4,401 m^{2} of which 1,463 m^{2} is retail space, 88 m^{2} is storage space and 2,850 m^{2} us residential apartments. A Coffee Industry Sweden branch occupies the ground floor of Fiolstræde 20.
