= Niels Schønberg Kurtzhals =

Danish architect and master builder (1772–1829)

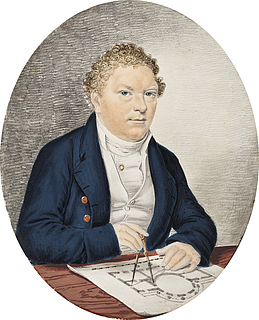
Niels Schønberg Kurtzhals

Niels Schønberg Kurtzhals (25 June 1772 – 4 June 1829) was a Danish architect and master builder who contributed to the rebuilding of Copenhagen after the Copenhagen Fire of 1795.

== Biography ==
Kurtzhals was born in Copenhagen on 25 June 1772, the son of master mason Asman/Asmond Kurtzhals and Erika Elisa Schønberg. He completed a mason's apprenticeship under court mason Johan Heinrich Brandemann and was then admitted to the Royal Danish Academy of Fine Arts where he won the small silver medal in 1789 and the large silver medal in 1789. In 1793 and again in 1791, he unsuccessfully competed for the Academy's gold medal.

== Career ==
Schønberg Kurtzhals was established as a master mason in 1796 and profited from the enormous need for construction services that had followed from the extensive destruction caused by the Great Fire of 1795 the previous year. He also worked for Christian Frederik Hansen on the rebuilding of the Church of Our Lady.

He eventually became an alderman of the Mason's Guild in Copenhagen. He was also a captain in the Fire Brigade and acted as valuer for Kjøbenhavns Brandforsikring (Copenhagen Fire Insurance) Fund.

== Personal life ==
Schønberg Kurtzhals was married to Cathrine Elisabeth Kurtzhals.

Schønberg Kurtzhals was a friend of Bertel Thorvaldsen during his student years at the academy. His sister Sophie Amalie Kurtzhals and Thorvaldsen were sweethearts before he left for Rome in 1796. On his departure, he gave her an allegorical drawing titled Time Rewards Virtue but eventually she grew tired of waiting and married master mason Johann Joachim Schlage.

Kurtzhals died on 4 June 1829 in Copenhagen. He is buried at Assistens Cemetery.

== Selected buildings ==
- Teglgårdsstræde 10 (1798)
- Højbro Plads 6 (1804–1806)
- Fiolstræde 20–22, Copenhagen (1810–1811)
