= Læderstræde 11 =

Building in Copenhagen

Amagertorv 1
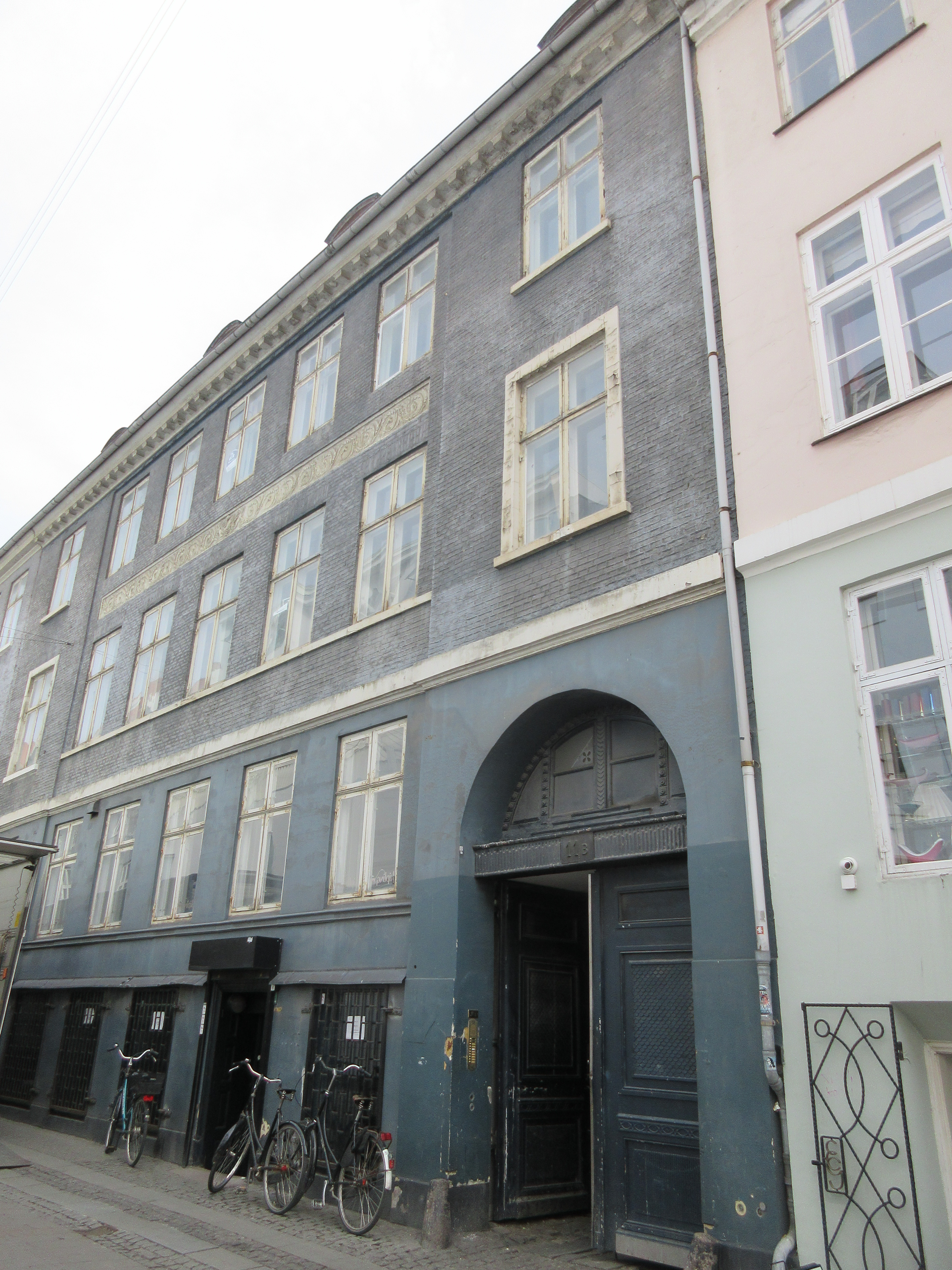
- Interactive map of the Amagertorv 1 area

General information
- Location: Copenhagen, Denmark
- Coordinates: 55°40′40.98″N 12°34′41.05″E
- Completed: 1806/1913, 1875
- Renovated: 2021

Læderstræde 11 consists of two buildings, a western building from 1806 (Læderstræde 11B) and an eastern one from 1875 (LæderstrædeA), situated on Strædet, close to Højbro Plads, in the Old Town of Copenhagen, Denmark. Læderstræde 11B was listed in the Danish registry of protected buildings and places in 1939. No. 11A is not heritage listed. Notable former residents include the businessman Louis Meyer, for whom the younger of the two buildings was constructed.

== History ==
=== 17th and 18th centuries ===
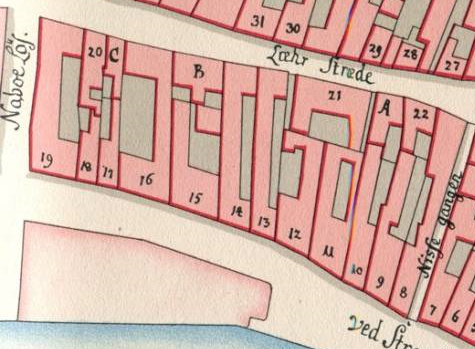
No. 13 seen in a detail from Christian Gedde's map of Strand Quarter, 1756

The property was in the late 17th century part of a larger property. The long, narrow lot continued all the way from Gammel Strand in the south to Læderstræde in the north. It was listed as No. 13 in Strand Quarter in Copenhagen's first cadastre of 1689 and was at that time owned by the king's tailor Jochum Skomager. The property was in the new cadastre of 1756 again listed as No. 13 and was at that time owned by the Jewish merchant Amsel Jacob Meyer (1728-1798).

At the time of the 1787 census, No. 13 was home to 36 residents in six households. Amsel Jacob Meyer resided in the building with his wife Hizilie, their six children (aged eight to 20), two office clerks and two maids. Michael Levin Rothschild, another Jewish merchant, resided in the building with his wife Hebela, their two children (aged four and six) and one maid. Phillip Phillipsen, a church official associated with the Polish congregation (Kirkke Betient ved Polsck Nation), resided in a third dwelling with two of his children (aged 35 and 38). Mindel Eichel resided in the building with her two daughters. Moses Wulff, another merchant, resided in the building with his wife Libna, their four children (aged one to eight) and the wife's brother Nathan (a merchant). Peter Nielssen, the proprietor of a tavern in the basement, resided in the associated dwelling with his wife Johanne Marie, their three sons (aged one to six) and a maid.

=== The Fire of 1795 ===
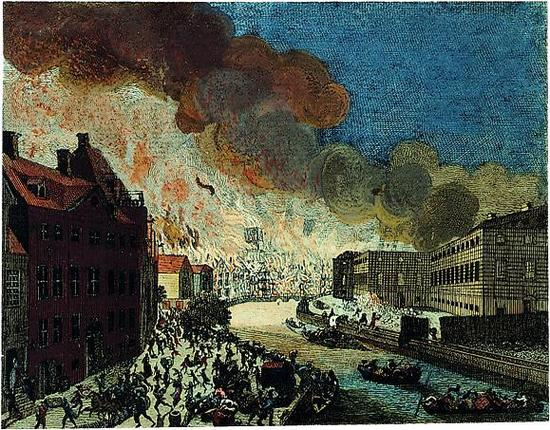
The Great Fire of 1795 progressing along Gammel Strand

The property was destroyed in the Copenhagen Fire of 1795, together with most of the other buildings in the area. The damaged buildings were initially restored. At the time of the 1801 census, No. 13 was thus home to nine households.

Herman Richter, a merchant, resided in the building with his wife Betty Dorothea Bernhardt, their two children (aged one and two) and one maid. Wulf Jacob Berns, a merchant (hørkræmmer), resided in the building with his wife Birthe Goldsmith, their three children (aged two to eight) and a 17-year-old son from the wife's first marriage. Jacob Albert Meyer, a merchant, resided and the building with his five children (aged seven to 17) and two maids. Ane Margrethe Ankersen, a 71-year-old widow, resided in the building with her 39-year-old daughter, two maids, Judita Hamar, Hamar's five children (aged 22 to 28) and one maid. Philip Seydler, a flutist in the Royal Danish Orchestra and instrumentmaker, resided in the building with his wife Augusta Tiemroth, their three children (aged one to three), a male servant and a maid. Didrich Didrichsen, secretary of the Royal Danish Agricultural Society, resided in the building with his wife Severine Marie Hallesen, their six children (aged eight to 20), a housekeeper (husjomfru) and a maid. Sigvart Colbiørnsen German, a clerk, resided in the building with his wife Adel Benedicta Schiøtt and a maid. Sigvart Colbiørnsen German, a beer seller, resided in the building with his wife Ide Margrethe Bukholt, their one-year-old son and a maid. Niels Jørgen Smith, the proprietor of a tavern in the basement, resided in the associated dwelling with his wife Mette Marie Ingerslef, their four children (aged four to 14) and one servant.

=== Nicolai Jacob Grave and the new building ===
The northern part of the property (fronting Læderstræde) was some time between 1803 and 1806 acquired by merchant (urtekræmmer) Nicolai Jacob Grave. He had until then resided at Vandkunsten No. 261 (now Løngangsstræde 15). His first wife Dorothea née Buch had died in 1803. He had subsequently married Anna Maria Groth. on 7 August 1804.

Grave chose to demolish the buildings on his new property. The current building on the site was constructed for him in 1806. The property was listed as No, 21 in the new cadastre of 1806. The southern part of the old No. 13 (fronting the canal) was listed as No. 12. It was at that time owned by the merchant Simon Jacob. In 1813, Grave purchased a section of the adjacent property at No. 22. It was partly used for a two-bay extension of his building. His property was subsequently referred to as No. 21/No. 22A (from 1859 again simply as No. 21).

Nicolai Jacob Grave's business was after his death (date unknown) continued by his eldest son Christian Nicolai Grave (1807-1880). The 60-year-old widow Anne Marie Grave was by 1840 the owner of a house with some attached land in Frederiksberg. She lived there with her son Jacob Wilhelm Grove 2 (aged 8) and daughter Nicoline Marie Grove (aged 29), her foster daughter Ottine Grove (aged 0), an 25-year-old unmarried woman Hora Hansen, a housekeeper (husjomfru), a male servant, a maid and another woman working for her.

At the time of the 1840 census, Læderstræde No. 21&22A was home to 24 residents in four households. The still unmarried 33-year-old Christian Nicolay Grave resided in the basement with two employees in his grocery business and one servant. Magnus Cornelius Møller, an administrator and general war commissioner, resided on the first floor with his wife Emilie Charlotte Bertelsen, their three children (aged 25 to 30) and a maid. Sophia Magdalene Urne (née Güldencrone, 1766–1851), widow of 'former stiftsamtmand in Jutland and overpræsident in Copenhagen Christian Urne (1739-1821), resided on the first floor with her daughter Christiane Urne, her seven-year-old grandson Axel Urne, 31-year-old Ida Blom, a male servant and two maids. Henriette Marie Ulrich (née Mourier), widow of Georg Frederik Ulrich (1762-1830), resided on the second floor with her four children (aged 14 to 22), a maid and a foster child.

The 31-year-old Ida Blom (1805-1884) was the daughter of stiftsamtmannd in Viborg Emanuel Blom and Charlotte Christiane von Arenstorff. On 4 November 1844, she was married to Christian Nicolai Grave.

The property was by 1845 home to only one new household. Levin Weil, a merchant (grosserer), was now residing on the second floor with his wife Sara Weil, their five children (aged one to nine), a male servant and two maids.

Christian and Ida Grave were by 1850 occupying both the first floor and basement of their building. They had been joined by Ida's sister Charlotte Blom (associated with Vemmetofte), 13-year-old niece Augusta Gundelach and 17-year-old nephew Frederik Gundelach. Ditlev Christian Wibe, a manager of Hovedmagasinet under the naval administration, resided on the ground floor with his wife Eva Cathrine Ebbsen, their two children (aged 12 and 14), a lodger, a male servant and a maid. Levin Weil was still residing with his wife, five children and two maids on the second floor.

At the time of the 1860 census, No. 21 was home to five households. Christian Nicolay Grave was now residing on the second floor with his wife, mother, sister, a housekeeper, two maids and the school boy Oscar Feddersen. Carl Emil Albeck and Hans Staal Lytzen Albeck (aged 29 and 27), a merchant (grosserer) and an assistant at the Zealand Railway Company, respectively, resided on the first floor towards the street. Sara Weil, Levin Weil's widow, resided on the first floor towards the yard with her three daughters (aged 16 to 21) and a maid. Michael Colman Levysohn, a merchant (grosserer), resided on the ground floor with his wife Gitte Levysohn (née Salomonsen), their two sons (aged one and two), one male servant and two maids. Three employees resided in the basement.

It is unclear when exactly Grave sold the property. He had become a senior clerk in the savings bank Bikuben and was also a captain in the Civil Guard (borgerbevæbningen). He was by 1880 residing in an apartment at Vandersgade 6.

=== Louis Meyer ===
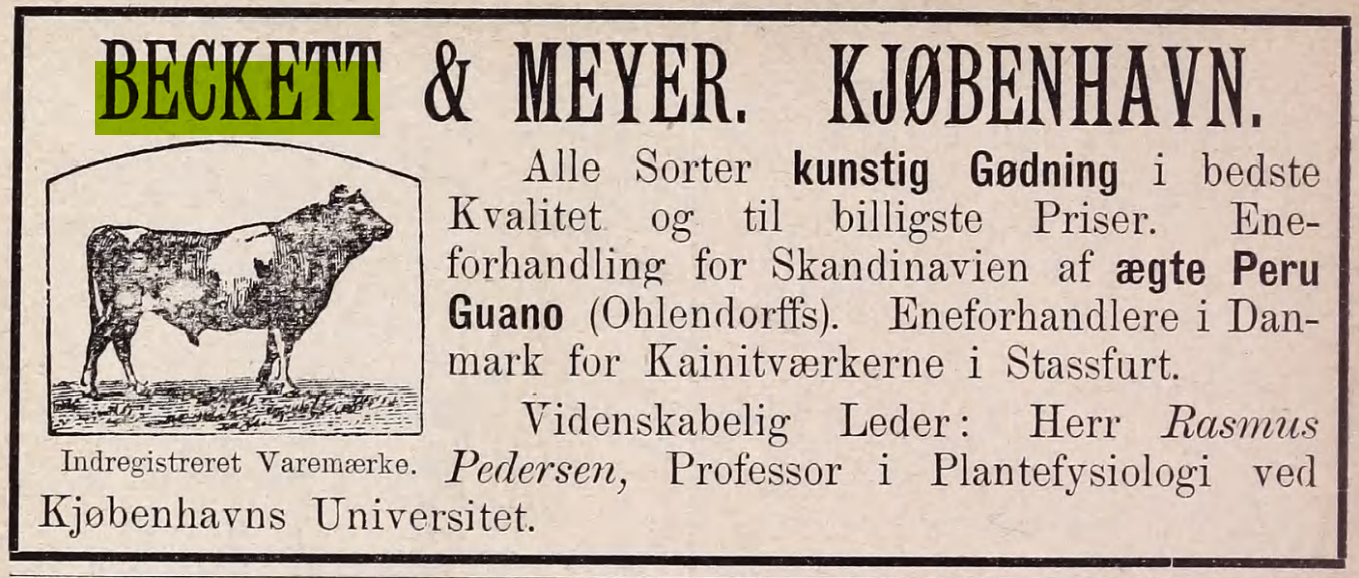
Advert for Beckett & Meyer from 1893/94

The businessman Louis Meyer purchased the property in the mid-1870s. In 1875, he constructed a new building on the eastern part of the property )now Læderstræde 11A). In 1866, Meyer had partnered with Hugo Lang Beckett (1843-1902) as Beckett & Meyer. In 1980, Beckett left the firm. It established a fertilizer factory at Kvæsthusgade 6 (where the Royal Danish Playhouse is today). The company was later moved to Hammerensgade 7.

Louis Meyer was in 1885 residing on the first floor of the building. The family's housekeeper Margrethe Ane Jensen resided on the ground floor. Christian Carl Birk, a schoolmaster, resided on the second floor with his wife Leontine Augusta Birk, their three children (aged 19 to 29), a 35-year-old niece, a female cook and a maid. Jens Christ.Atterup, a joiner, resided on the third floor with his wife Karoline Christine Atterup, their 10-year-old daughter and one lodger. Johannes Petersen, a beer seller (øktapper), resided in the basement with his wife Sine Marie Petersen and their two sons. P.Petersen, a grocer (spækhøker), resided in the basement with his wife Johanne Petersen, their four children (aged 1 to 14) and one maid.

=== 20th century ===
The building was from 1911 home to a book printing business established by C. A. Rasmussen and H. C. Rugh. It was later continued by a new owner as Thor Møllers Bogtrykkeri. As of 1950, it was owned by J. Møller and A. E. Wieth Nielsen. It was at that time still based in the building.

Læderstræde 11 was in 2008 owned by E/F Læderstræde 11 A-B.

== Architecture ==
Læderstræde 11B is constructed with three storeys over a walk-out basement and is nine bays wide. The seven western bays is Grave's original building from 1806 while the two eastern ones date from the 1813 extension. The two parts of the building are visually integrated, especially at street level, but the transition is still clearly visible on the upper part, both in the masonry and as an overall asymmetry in the design. The two outer bays of the 1806 building were thus wider than the five central ones, but due to the extension, one of these wider bays is no longer situated furthest to the left. The original part of the façade is furthermore finished with a white-painted belt course above the ground floor, a Greek key frieze between the five central windows of the two upper floors and a dentillated cornice. The white-painted belt course and the plastered, grey-painted ground floor have been continued across the extension, but the Greek key is no longer placed in the centre of the façade and the cornice is without dentillation on the extension. A gateway is located in the wide bay furthest to the right (west). It opens to a central courtyard shared with No. 11A. A side wing extends from the rear side of the building along the west side of the courtyard and is attached to a rear wing at the other end.

== Today ==
In September 2019, Læderstræde 11 was purchased for DKK72 million by Copenhagen Capital in partnership with Helmersen Holding. The property has a total floor area of 2,162 square metres. A comprehensive renovation of the building was completed in 2021. It now contains seven rental apartments.
