= Louis Meyer (businessman) =

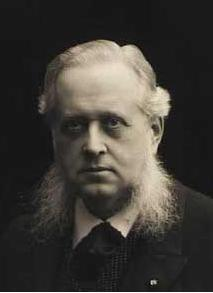
- Born: 6 March 1843; Copenhagen, Denmark
- Died: 29 September 1929 (aged 97); Vedbæk, Denmark
- Occupation: Businessman
- Awards: Grand Cross of the Dannebrog

Louis Meyer (6 March 1843 – 12 September 1929) was a Danish businessman. His company, Beckett & Meyer, a wholesale company, was after his death continued by his son Ernst Meyer.

== Early life and education ==
Meyer was born on 6 March 1843 in Copenhagen, the son of Alfred Jacob Meyer (1806–1880) and Sophie Melchior (1809–1883). His father owned his own trading house. His mother was previously married to lawyer Meyer Abrahamson (1798–1833). He received a commercial education in his maternal uncles Moritz Moses Melchior's firm Moses & Søn G. Melchior.

== Career ==
In March 1866, Meyer established his own firm in a partnership with H. L. Beckett, a colleague from Moses & Søn G. Melchior, under the name Beckett & Meyer. They started out by trading in sugar, soon establishing an import of brown sugar from Scotland, a product that gained widespread popularity in Denmark during the 1870s. H. L. Beckett left the company in 1879. A. Abrahamson was a few years later made a partner in the firm but left it again when Meyer's son Ernst Meyer became a partner in 1906. The boom in the Danish sugar industry of the 1880s made it necessary for the firm to move into other markets, of which coffee was the by far most important. Beckett & Meyer established an import of fertilizers in 1884 but this business was in 1897 sold to A/S Dansk svovlsyre- og superfosfatfabrik. The firm then began to trade in molasses and dried blood for animal feed.

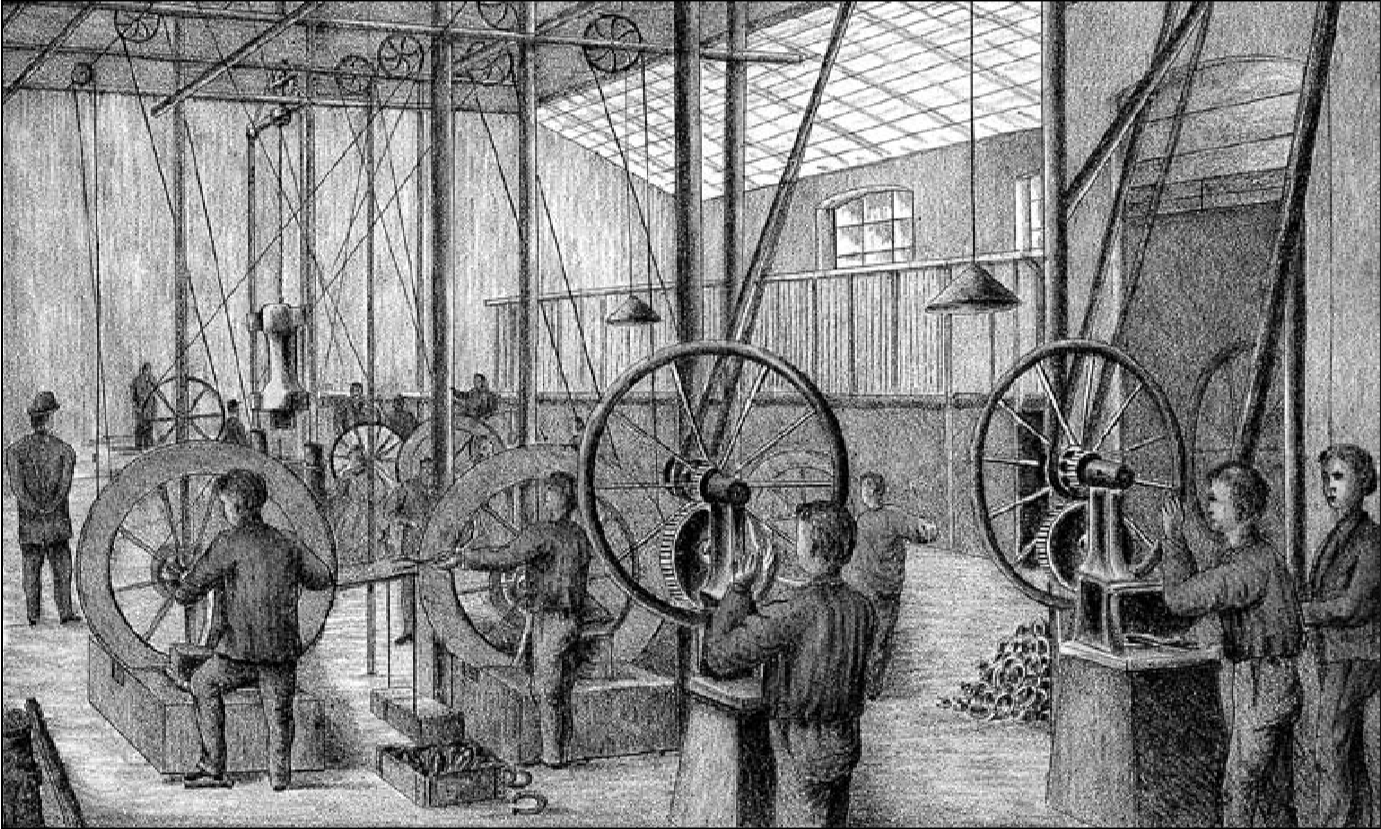
Kjøbenhavns Hesteskofabrik

In 1883, together with Moses Melchior, Beckett & Meyer had also acquired Københavns Hesteskofabrik, a horseshoe factory on Tagensvej, which after a while obtained a dominant position on the Danish market. Beckett & Meyer bought Moses Melchior's share of the firm in 1902 and converted it into a limited company (aktieselskab).

In around 1900, Beckett & Meyer also began to trade in syrup, cigars and tobacco. Meyer was also a board member of De Danske Spritfabrikker.

== Other activities ==
Meyer was a member of Grosserer-Societetet's committee from 1910 to 1918. From 1910 to 1922, he was a member of the Customs Council (Toldrådet). He published Bedstefaders Rejse til Amerika in 1916.

== Property ==
In the early 1870s, Meyer purchased the property at Læderstræde 11 in Copenhagen. He constructed the building at Læderstræde 11A on the eastern part of the property in 1875. The older building at Læderstræde 11B (1807) was listed in the Danish registry of protected buildings and places in 1939. In 1878 Meyer also purchased the country house Villa Rex in Skodsborg. He undertook a comprehensive renovation of the building in 1880. He later owned the country house Villa Padre in Vedbæk from 1896 until his death.

== Personal life ==
Meyer married on 15 August 1867 in Copenhagen Thea Marie Johanne Friedlander (7 February 1845 – 21 January 1908), daughter of paper merchant Sally Friedlander (1808–1869) and Betzy Rosalie Bloch (1817–1852). They had 14 children, of which nine lived to adulthood.

Meyer is one of the businessmen featured in Peder Severin Krøyer's monumental 1895 oil-on-canvas group portrait painting From Copenhagen Stock Exchange in Børsen. He was created a Knight in the Order of the Dannebrog in 1919 and was awarded the Cross of Merit in 1920. He died on 12 September 1929 in Vedbæk and is buried at the Jewish Western Cemetery in Copenhagen.

His firm was continued by his eldest son Ernst Meyer and later by his grandson Knud Meyer. It closed in the 1950s.

One of Louis Meyer's other sons, Vilhelm Meyer (1878–1935), settled as a successful businessman in Shanghai but died at an early age. A daughter, Emilie Meyer, married William Heering of the Heering family of cherry liqueur manufacturers.
