= Gothersgade 29 =

Building in Copenhagen, Denmark

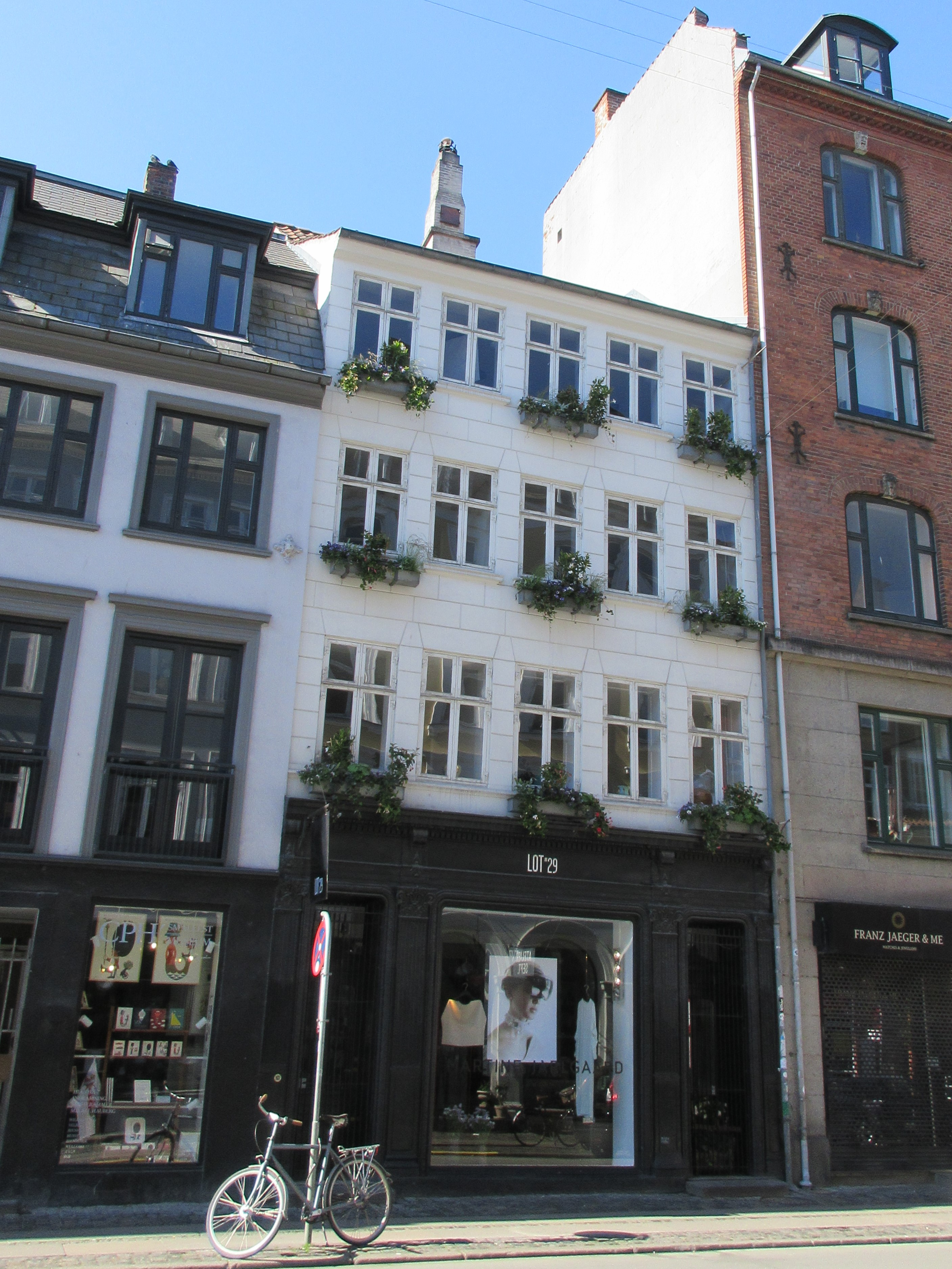
- Interactive map of the Gothersgade 29 area

General information
- Location: Copenhagen, Denmark
- Coordinates: 55°40′55.13″N 12°34′58.73″E

Gothersgade 29 is a property with roots going back to the late 17th century. It was later increased in height twice and with a facade design dating from 1865, situated in Gothersgade, opposite Borgergade, in the Old Town of Copenhagen, Denmark. The building fronting the street is via a staircase on the rear attached to a half-timbered rear wing from before 1710. The complex was listed in the Danish registry of protected buildings and places in 1981.

== Architecture ==
Gothersgade 29 was constructed as a two-storey half-timbered building sometime between 1677 and 1684. The facade was then crowned by a three-bay gabled wall dormer. The building was attached to a half-timbered rear wing (constructed before 1710) via a staircase at the rear. In 1765, the front wing and staircase were expanded by one storey and the facade was rebuilt in brick at the same time. In 1784, the rear side of the building was also rebuilt in brick on the two lower floors. From 1837 to 1848, the building was again expanded by one floor. The facade was adapted to its current design in 1863. The plastered upper part of the facade is finished with shadow joints, a sill course below the windows on the first floor and a cornice. The entrance to the shop in the ground floor is flanked by fluted pilasters with capitals.
