= Rosenborg Annex =

Listed buildings in Copenhagen

- Rosenborg-annekset
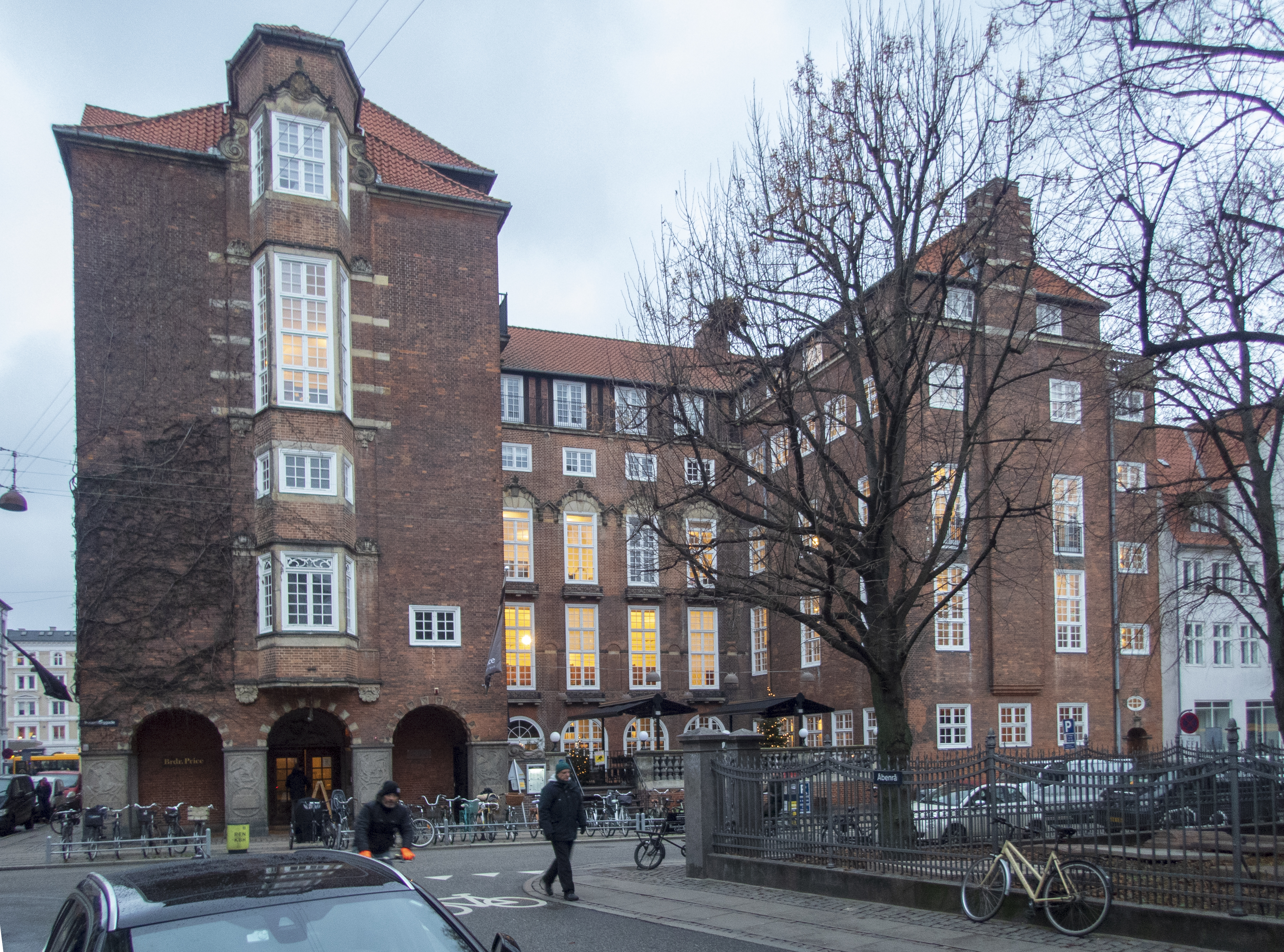
- Interactive map of the Rosenborg Annex area

General information
- Location: Copenhagen, Denmark
- Coordinates: 55°41′1.9″N 12°34′27.77″E
- Construction started: 1915
- Completed: 1917

Design and construction
- Architect: Henning Hansen

Rosenborg Annex (Danish: Rosenborg-Annekset) is a National Romantic building situated at the corner of Rosenborggade and Tornebuskegade. close to Nørreport station, in central Copenhagen, Denmark. Built in 1915–17 to designs by Henning Hansen, it was constructed as an extension of the Danish YMCA's building on Gothersgade. It was listed in the Danish registry of protected buildings and places in 2007. The older part of the KFUM headquarters, a Historicist building from 1899–1900, designed by Jens Christian Kofoed, is not part of the heritage listing.

The Rosenborg Annex is located opposite the narrow green space that surrounds the Reformed Church, whose principal facade faces Gothersgade. The building is now owned by Jeudan. Epicurus, a combined restaurant, cocktail bar, and jazz venue, is now located in the basement.

== History ==
=== KFUM and their headquarters ===
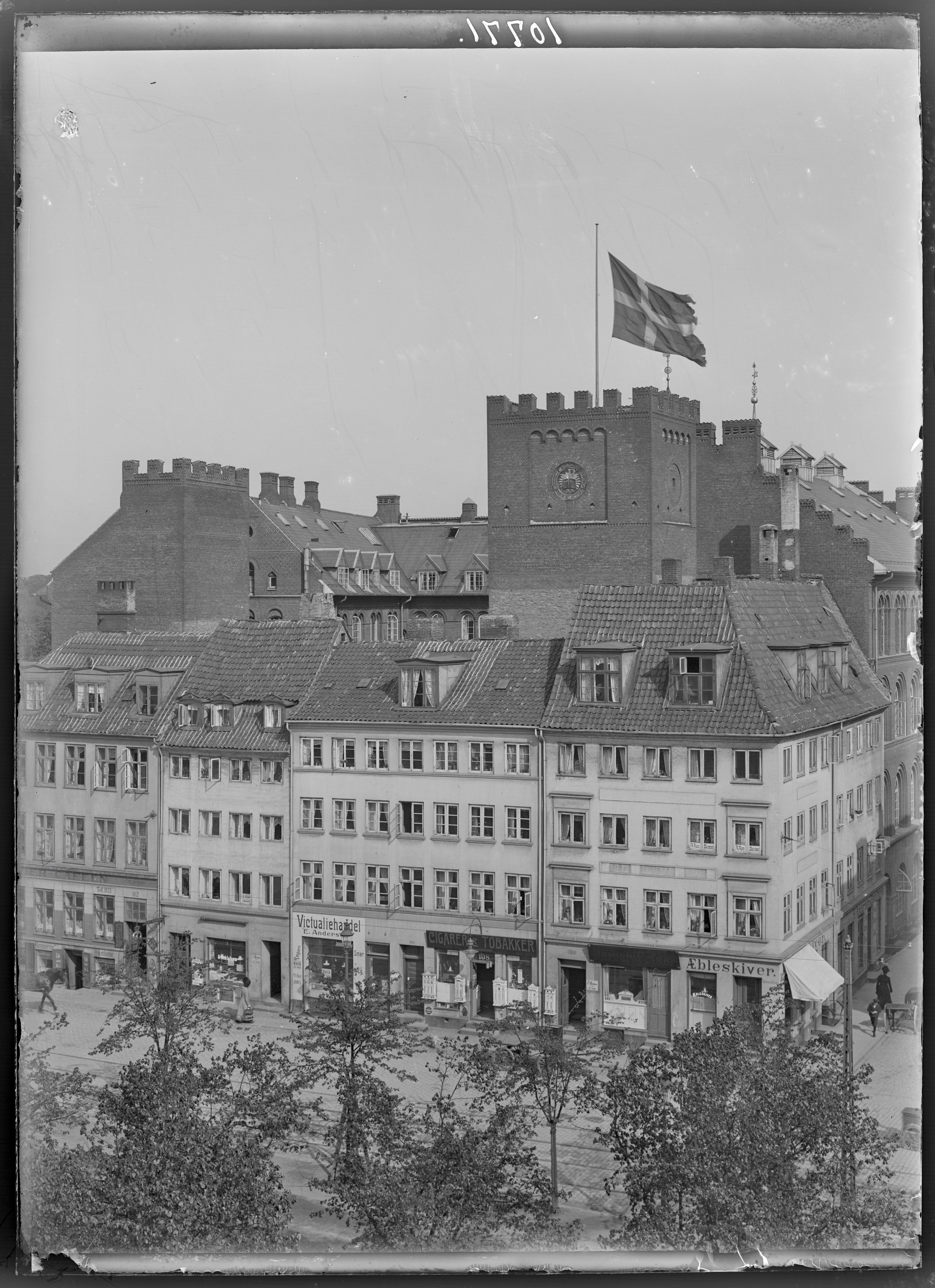
The KFUM headquarters rising above a row of old buildings towards Nørre Voldgade, 1912.

The Danish chapter of YMCA, KFUM (short for Kristelig Forening for Unge Mænd), was established on 16 September 1878. Christian Krarup, a board member of the Church Association for the Inner Mission in Denmark, had just attended the YMCA's world congress in Geneva. The KFUM's new headquarters was constructed at Gothersgade 115 in 1899–1900. The headquarters consisted of two buildings, one facing Gothersgade and another facing Tornebuskegade on the other side of the block. Access to the Tornebuskegade wing was via the central courtyard. Due to its Historicist style, which relied on Medieval architecture for inspiration, it became known as KFUM-borgen (The KFUM Castle).

The building doubled as a soldiers' home, with a library, reading room, dining room, and other facilities, where the recruits from Rosenborg Barracks on the other side of the street could spend their spare time.

=== kFUM's extension ===
Due to the growing number of soldiers during World War I, it became necessary to expand the building. The young architect Henning Hansen was charged with designing the extension. His building replaced a couple of townhouses from the 18th century at the corner of Rosenborggade and Tornebuskegade. The building contained a new gymnasium for the soldiers in the basement.

=== Later history ===
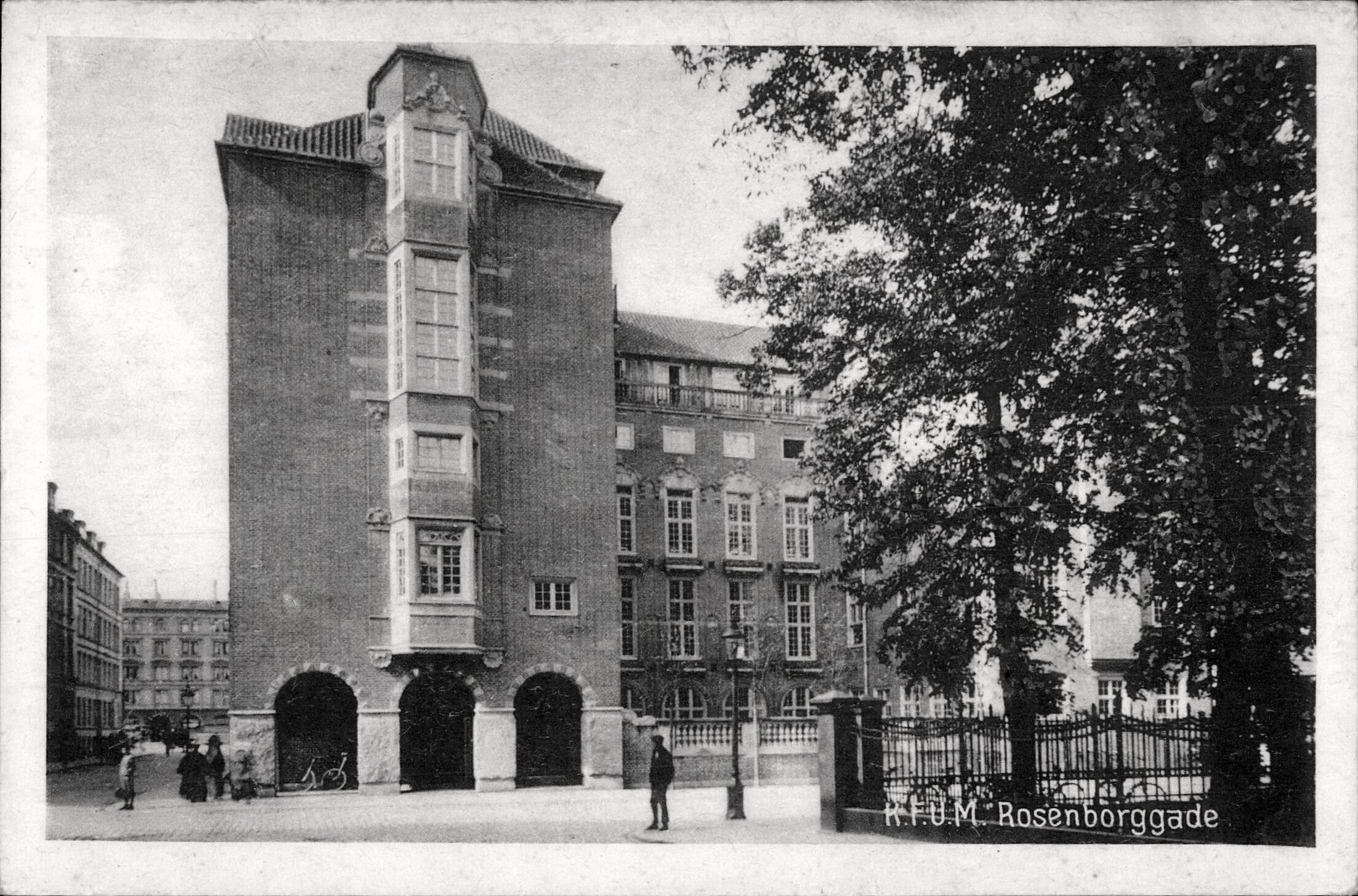
The building in the first half of the 20th century.

In 1965, Hansen's extension was acquired by the University of Copenhagen. From then on, it was referred to as the Rosenborg Annex. The Department of Political Science was based in the building until 2005, when it relocated to the Centre for Health and Social Sciences in the former Copenhagen Municipal Hospital.

In 2015, Catella purchased the Rosenborg Annex for just under DKK 100 million. In February 2024, it was acquired by Jeudan.

== Architecture ==
The building is a three-winged complex, consisting of two short, perpendicular lateral wings and a slightly lower, recessed central wing, wrapped around a central, raised veranda shielded from the street by a balustrade. The solution with a recessed wing was chosen to squeeze in as many square metres as possible without dominating the green space surrounding the Reformed Church on the other side of the street. The gable of the perpendicular corner wing (left-hand-side) features an arcade with the main entrance to the building as well as a basement entrance. The three granite pillars are decorated with relief ornamentation. The arches between the pillars are executed with alternating red and white bands, similarly to that seen in some of Martin Nyrop's buildings. Above the arcade is a four-storey bay window motif. The only other window on this gable is a relatively small window located to the right of the bay window on the first floor. The other gable (right-hand-side) features a central projection on the upper floor, which turns into a chimney, complementing the bay windows on the other gable, creating a sense of symmetry. The central projection is flanked by two vertical rows of windows. The transition from this gable is made to the lower, 18th-century building next to it by a narrow and somewhat lower connector with an arched doorway (No. 17). The recessed central wing has arched windows on the first and third floors. The fourth-floor windows are significantly lower than the tall, slender ones on the other floors. The central wing and the perpendicular wing to the right are both topped by Mansard roofs.

== Restaurants ==
In 2013, James and Adam Price opened their first Brdr. Price restaurant in the building. It closed in early 2025.

The restaurant Epicurus, which combines dining with live jazz music, opened in Brdr. Price's former premises in April 2025. The restaurant is owned by the businessman Lars Seier (co-owner of Alchemist and Geranium), restaurateur Mads Bøttger (Dragsholm Castle), jazz musician Niels Lan Doky, and Rasmus Shepherd-Lomborg (Ruby Cocktail Bar). The interior was designed by Italian-Danish architect team GamFratesi.

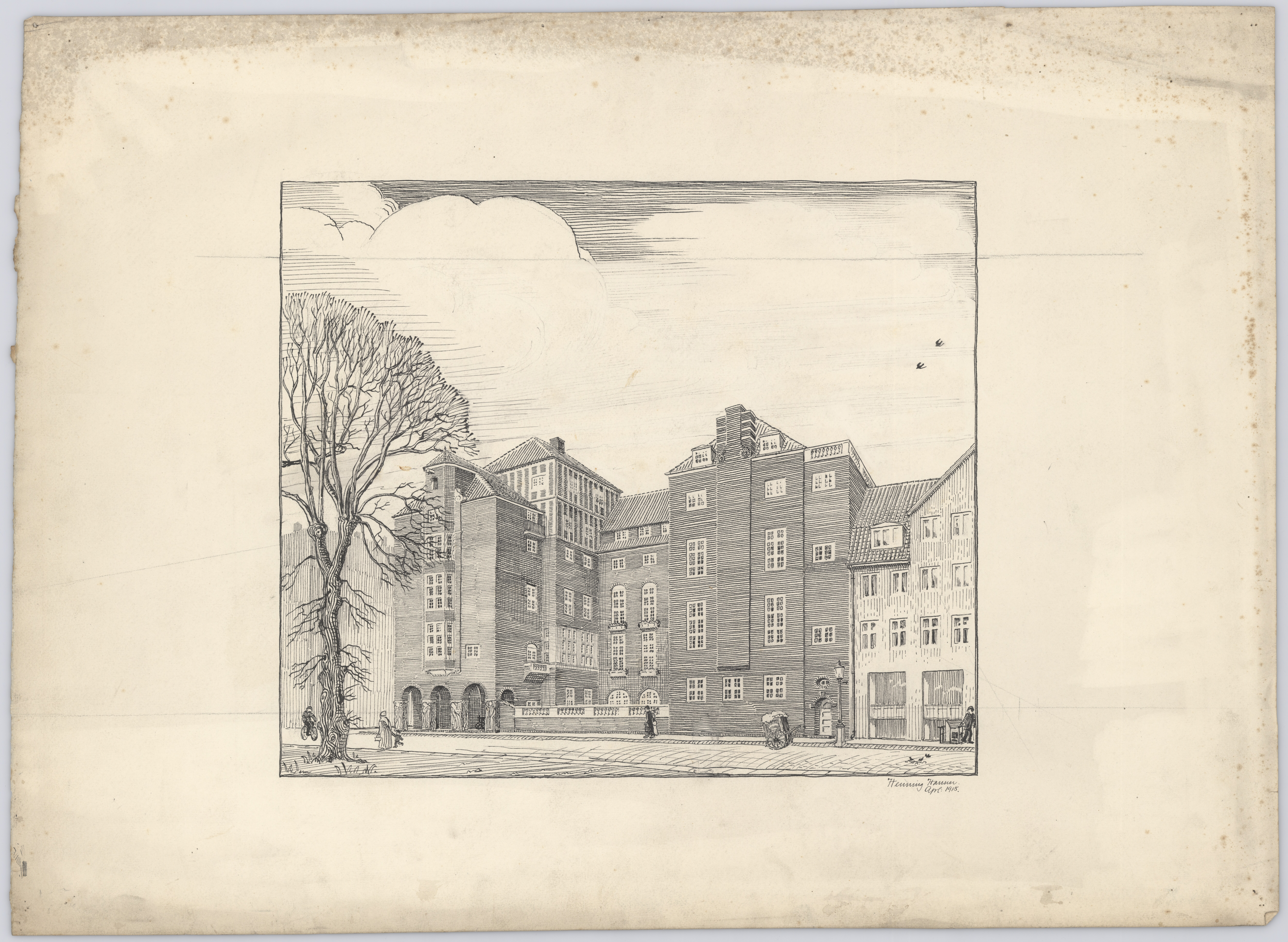
Facade

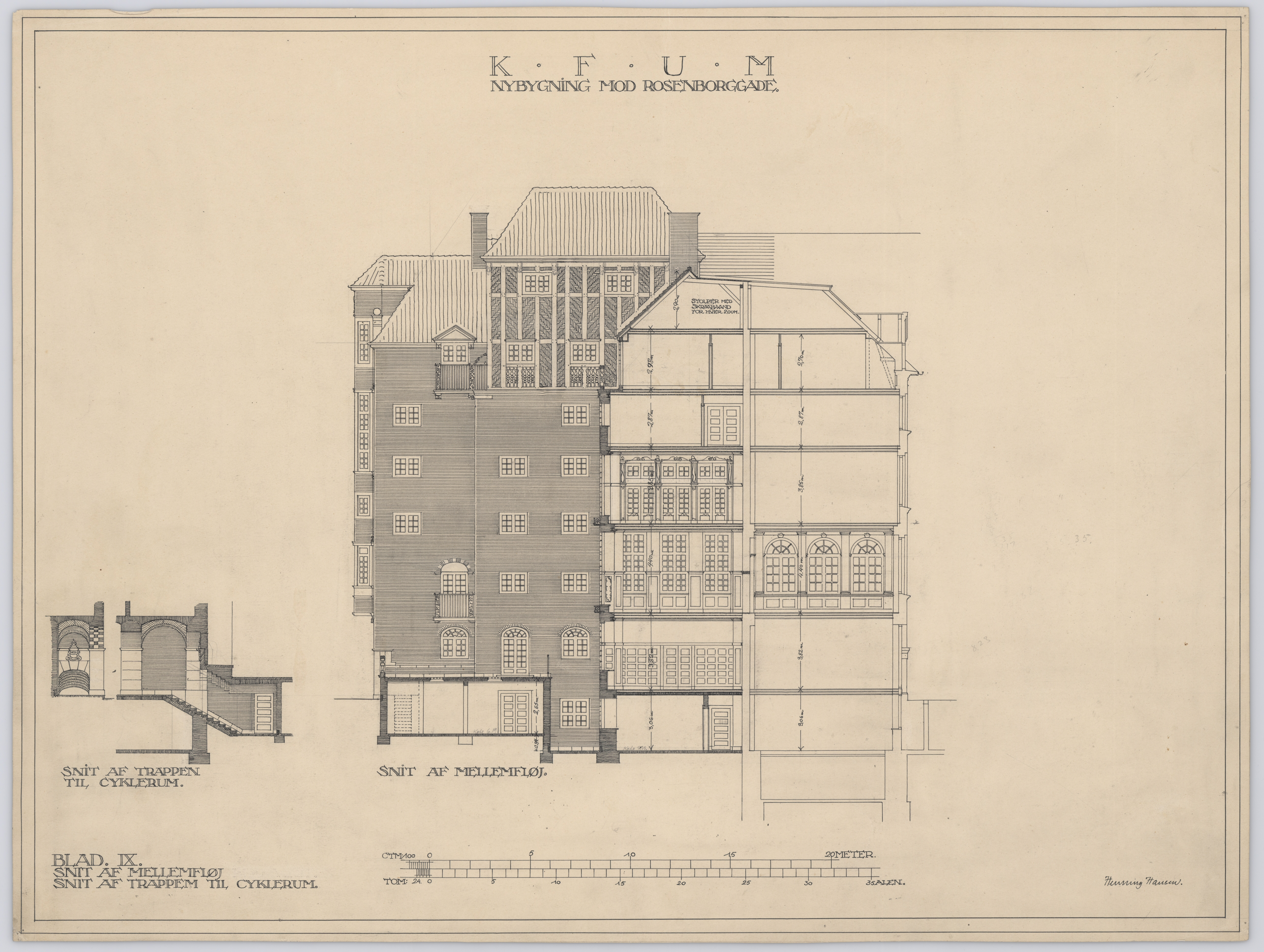
Cross-section of the building

Plan of one of the floors

== Gallery ==
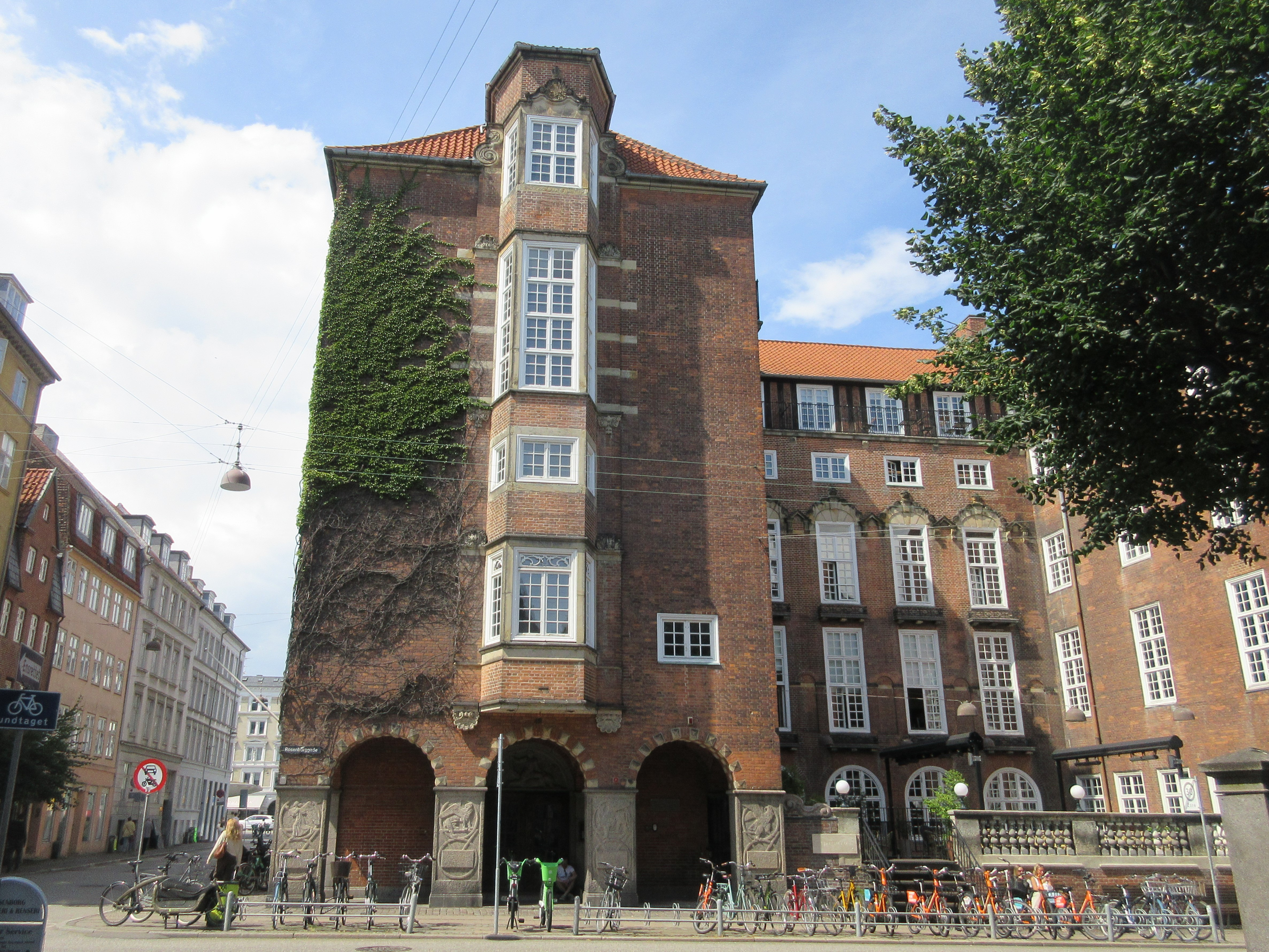

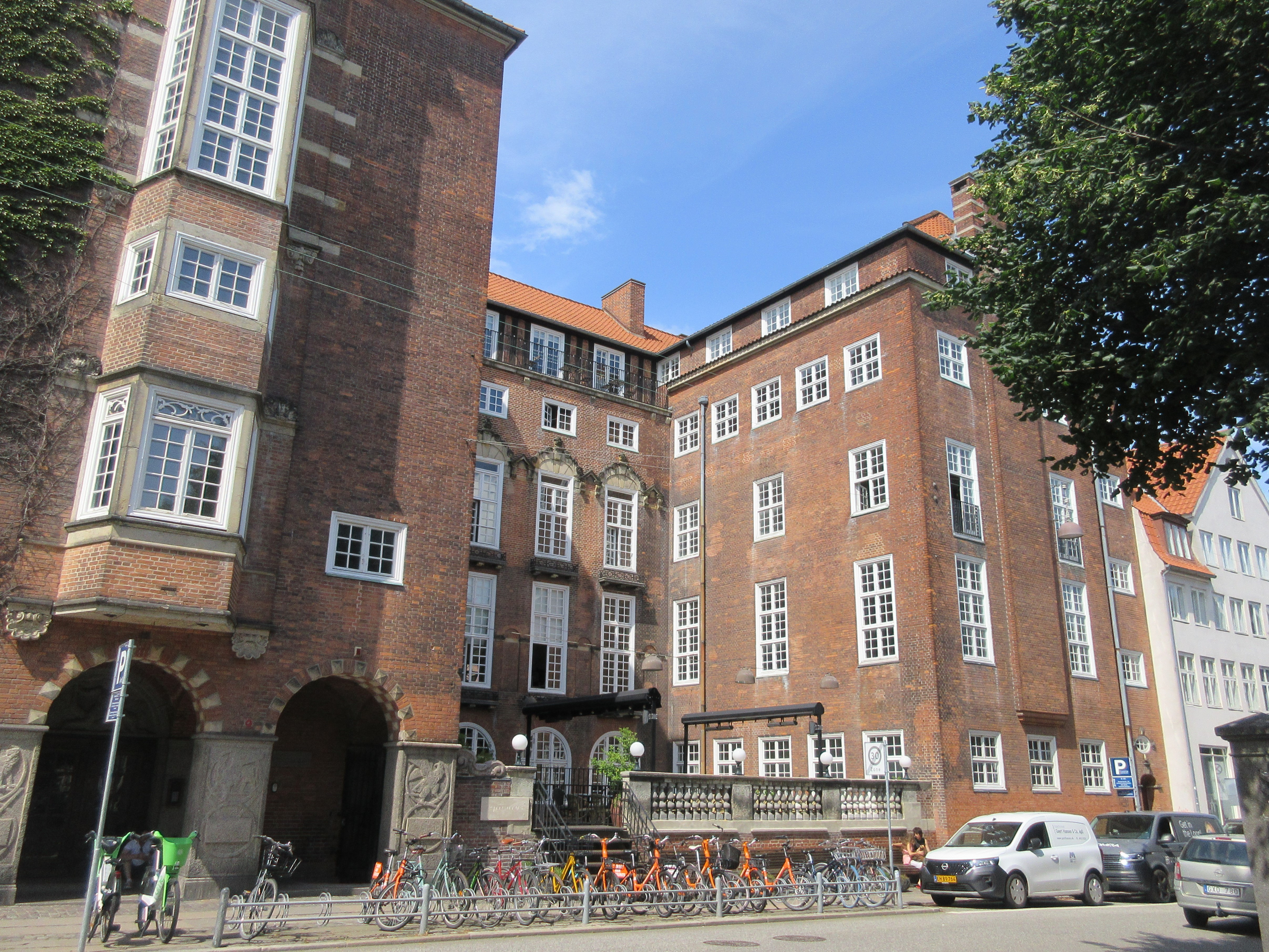

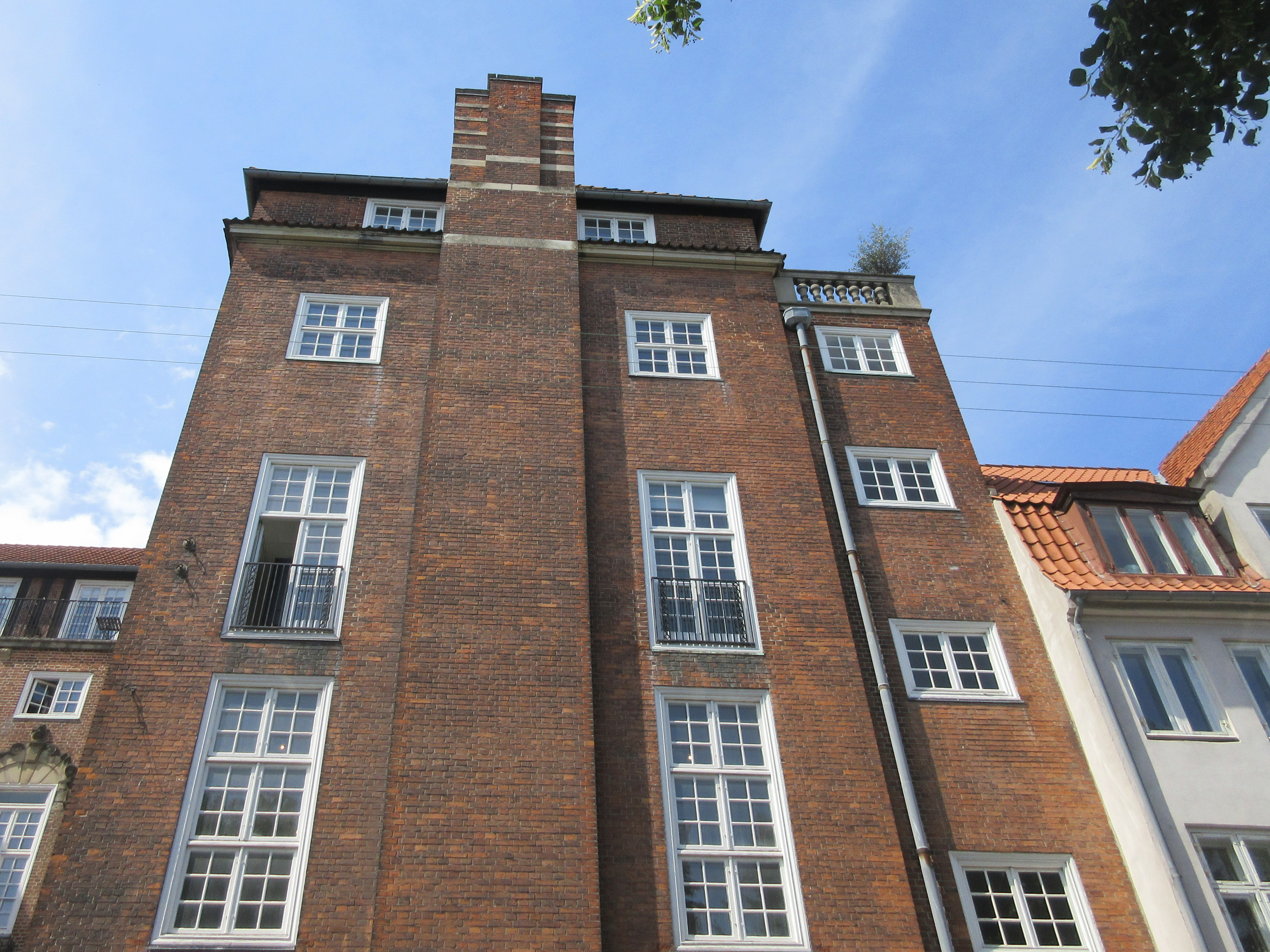

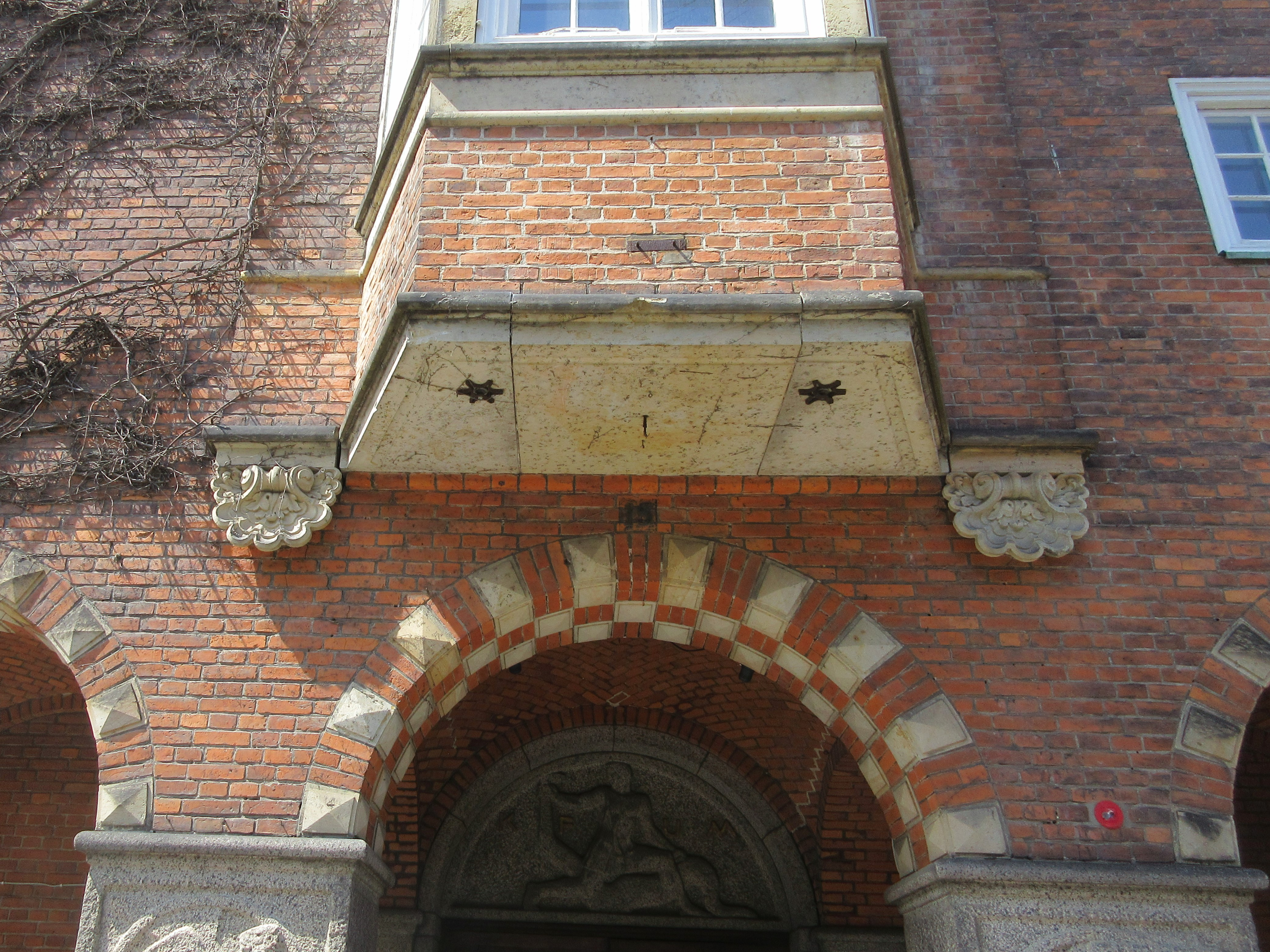

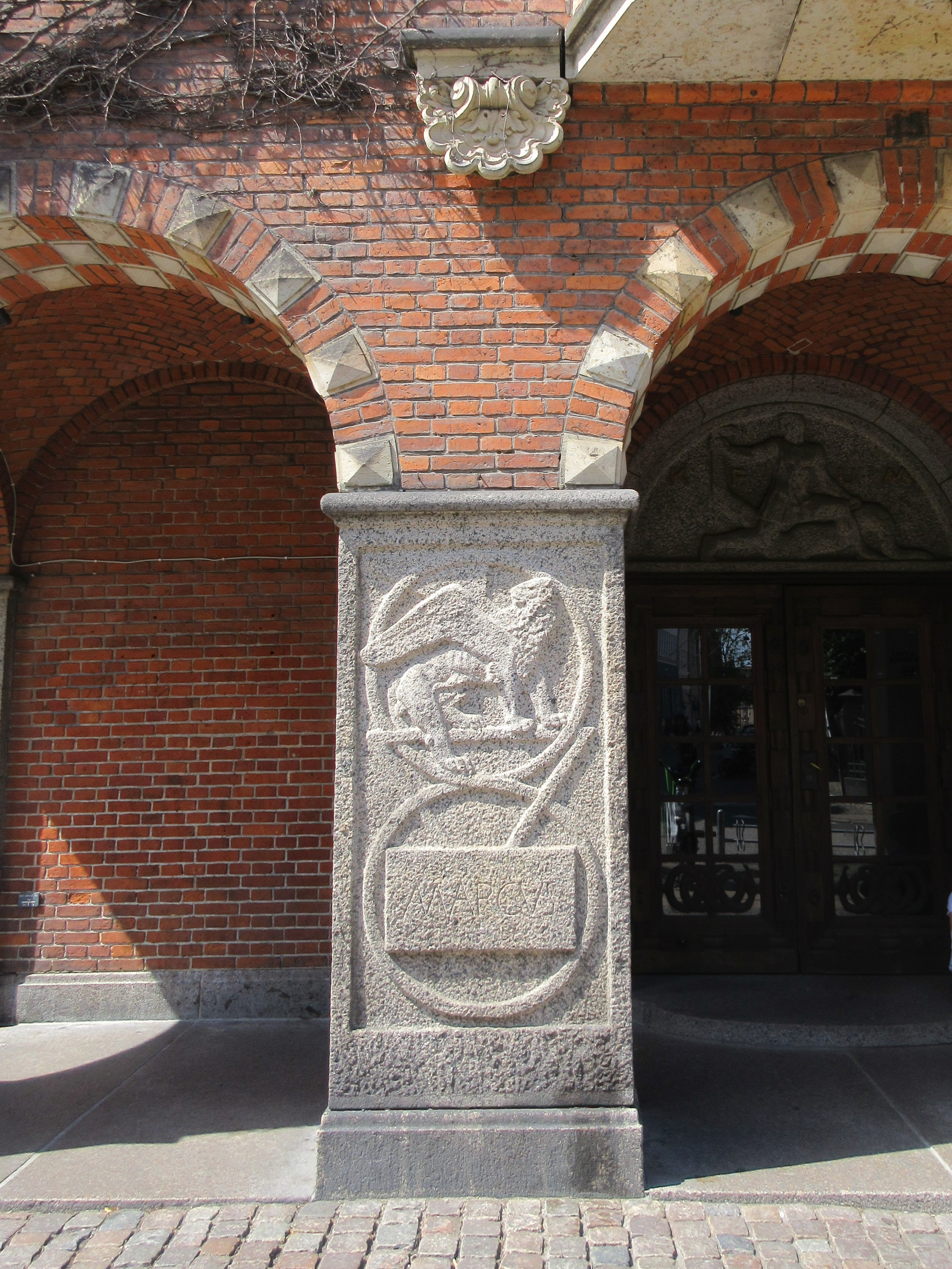

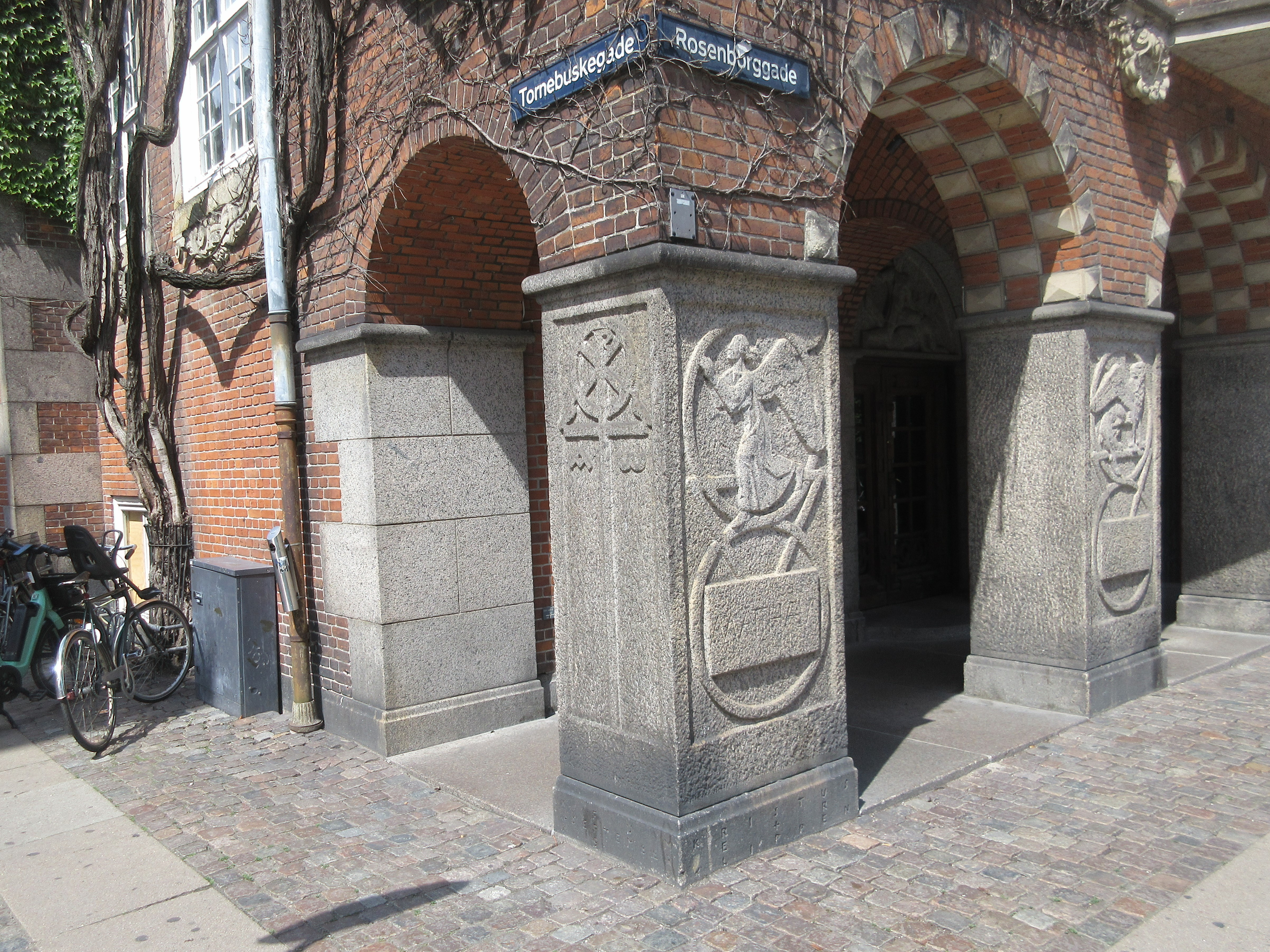

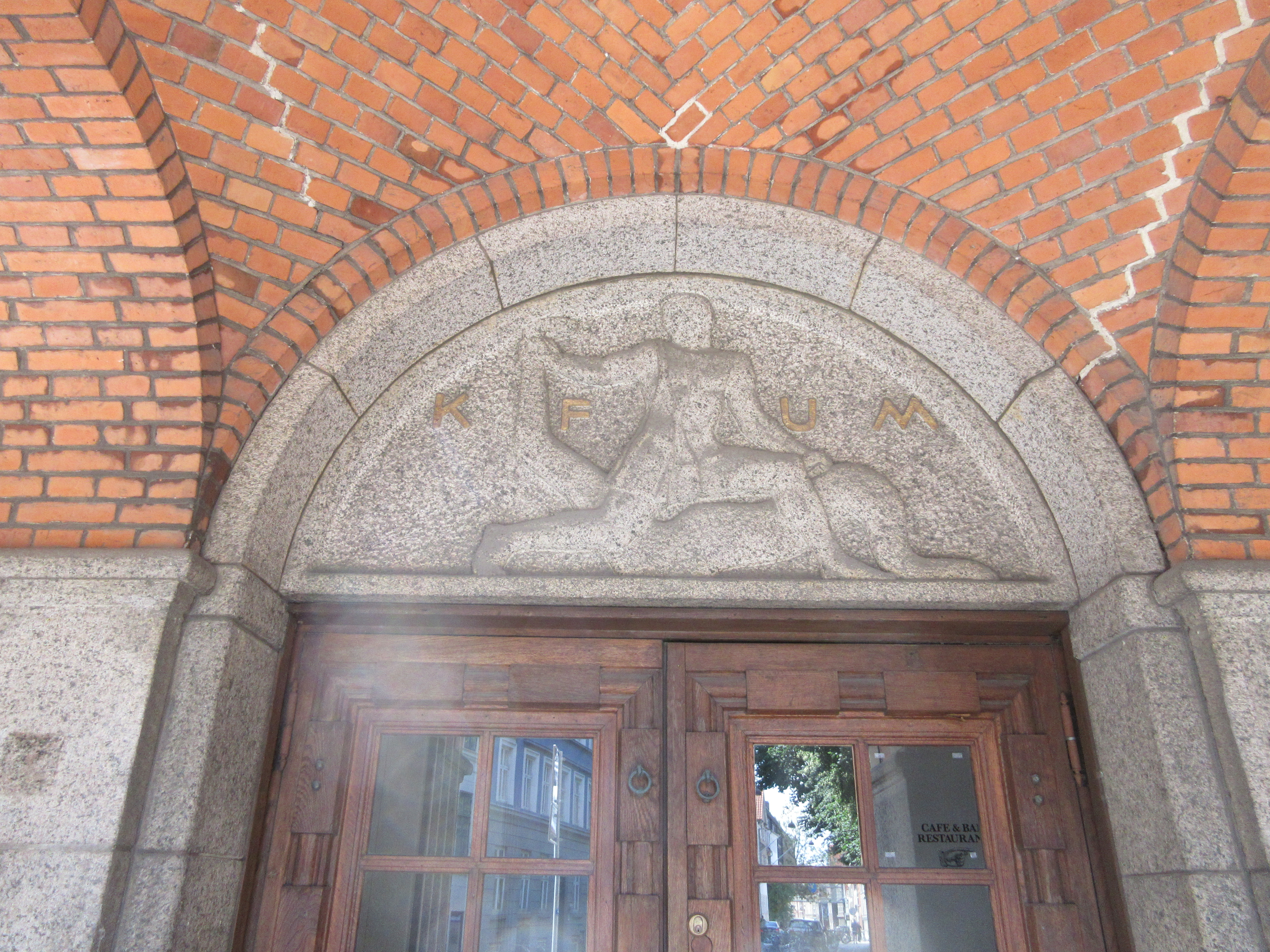
Relief above the main entrance in the arcade

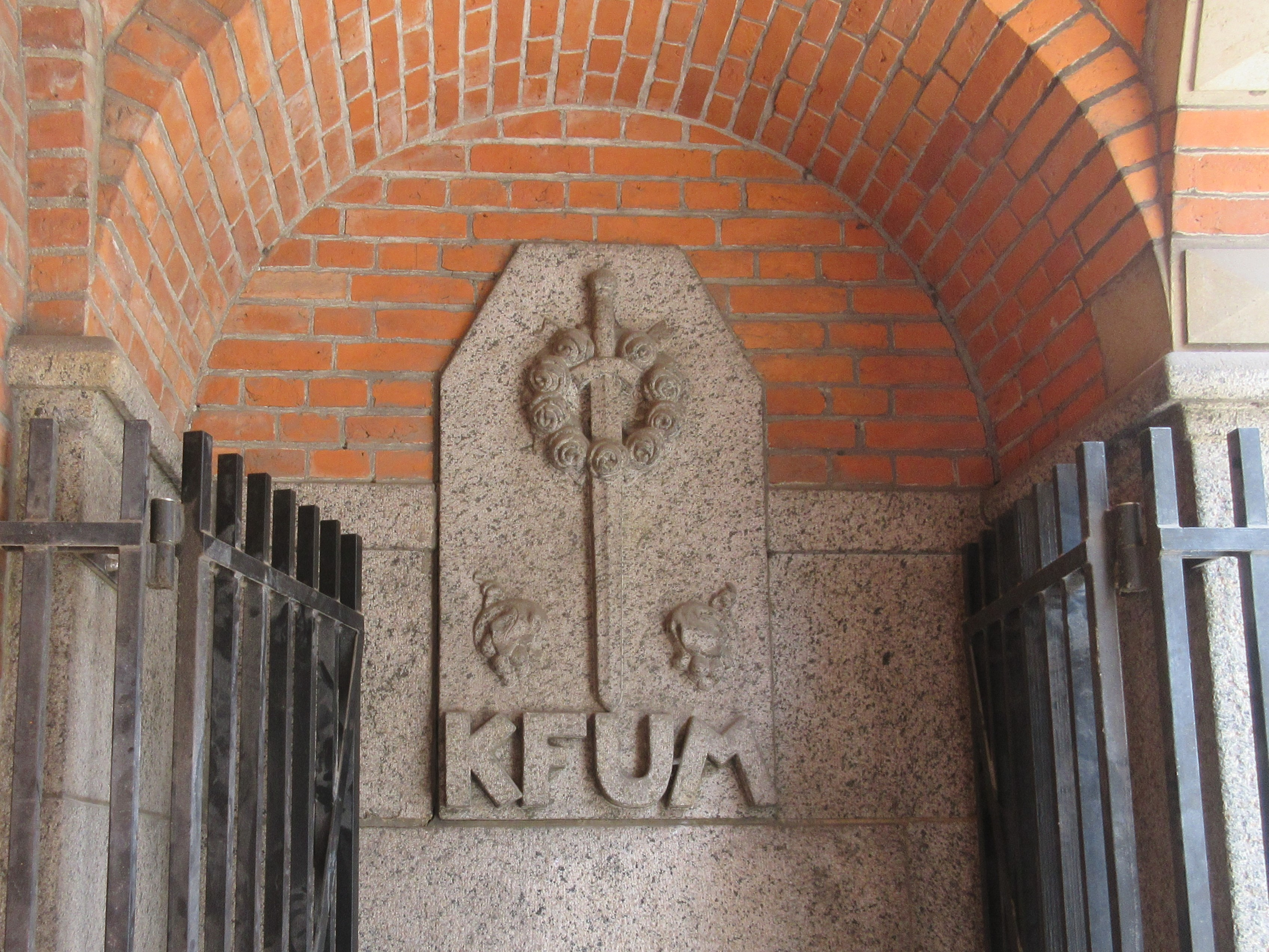
Relief above the basement entrance in the arcade

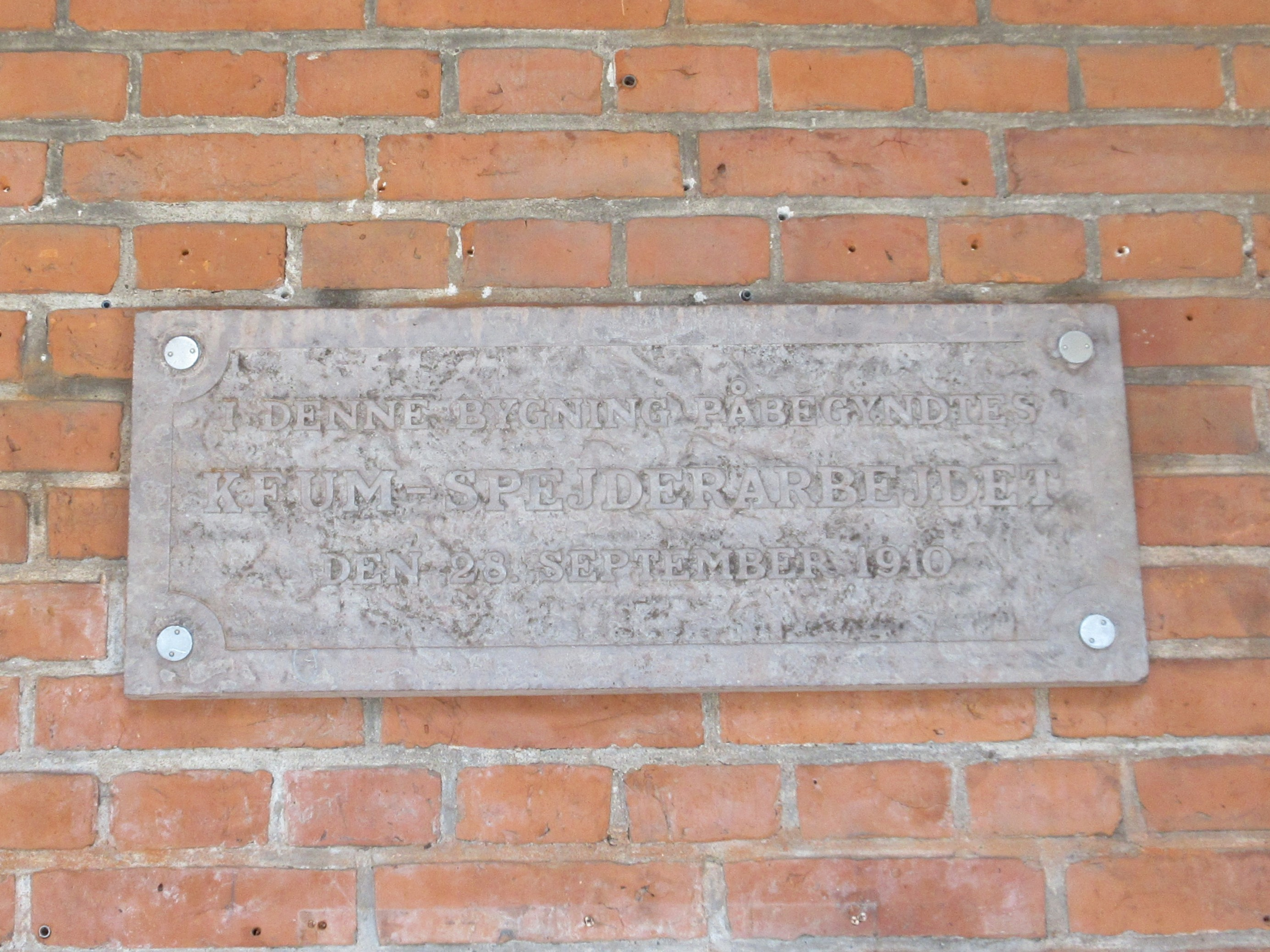
Stone plaque with inscription in the arcade
