= Henning Hansen =

Danish architect (1980–1945)

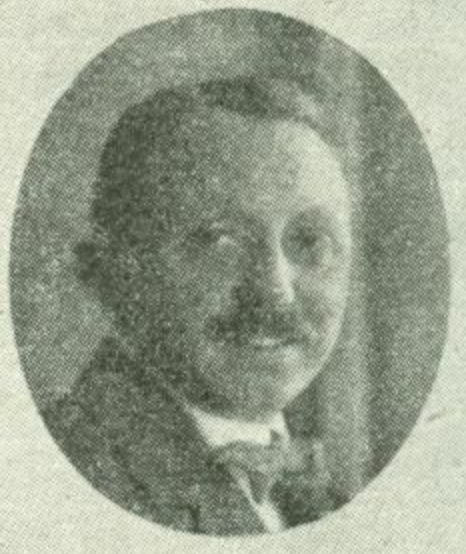
- Born: 8 July 1880; Odense, Denmark
- Died: 8 August 1945 (aged 65); Copenhagen, Denmark
- Occupation: Architect

Signature
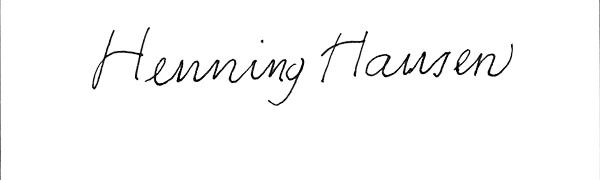

Henning Hansen (18 July 1880 – 8 August 1945) was a Danish architect.

== Early life and education ==
Hansen was born on 18 July 1880 in Odense, the son of master joiner Hans Henning Hansen (1839–1923) and Johanne (Hanne) Jørgensen (1838–1913).

Hansen completed a joiner's apprenticeship in his home town. He was also educated as an executing architect (konduktøreksemen) from Odense Technical School in 1899. After moving to Copenhagen, he was trained in drawing at Vermehren's drawing school. He attended the Royal Danish Academy of Fine Arts' School of Architecture from 1899 to 1907. In 1910, he won the academy's small gold medal for his design of "a manor house". This earned him the academy's great travel stipend. The journey took him to Greece and Spain. During his stay in Greece, he attended the École Francaise d'Athénes and participated in the institution's excavations at Delos. Other journeys took him to Italy, France, England and the Netherlands.

In 1911–1913, he worked as an assistant for Martin Nyrop. He was also influenced by Andreas Clemmensen and Ulrik Plesner for whom he had worked as executing architect.

== Career ==
Rendering for the Danish pavilion in Malmö, 1914.

In 1911, Hansen established his own architectural studio. Not long thereafter, he won 1st prize in the competition for the design of the Danish pavilion at the 1914 Baltic Exhibition in Malmö. His winning proposal, which combined inspiration from Renaissance manor houses with influences from the Arts and Crafts movement, won him the Academy's Annual Medal. In his design of an expansion of KFUM's headquarters on Rosenborggade in Copenhagen (1914; heritage listed in 1979), he also combined inspiration from historical styles with influences from English architecture. Many of his other early works were single-family detached houses, frequently designed in collaboration with Louis Hygom. Unlike many of his contemporaries, such as Povl Baymann, he did not turn to Nordic Classicism or Modernism wholeheartedly, but was more inclined to switch between different styles, just like he with inspiration from his old teacher, Matin Nyrop, remained fond of eclectic, decorative details.

In the 1920s and 1930s, Hansen designed a number of large housing estates in Copenhagen. Borgerbo (1914) had made the most out of an iregularly shaped site in Amager. With Solgården, Hansen adopted a significantly more innovative approach to modern residential architecture. The design broke with the traditional perimeter block by leaving the southwestern corner open to let in more sunlight. The main entrances were also placed on the yard-side of the buildings, unlike what was normal at the time, and the ground-floor apartments had small front gardens separated from the rest of the courtyards by low walls. Kanslergården in Østerbro (1929; heritage listed in 2009) set a new standard for public housing with its large apartments and mansion-like Baroque Revival architecture.

In 1930–31, he designed Danish Bicycle Club's new velodrome in Ordrup north of the city. In 1936, he won 1st prize in the competition for a new Frederiksberg Town Hall. Construction started in 1941 but was uit on hold the following year due to scarcity of materials during World War II. After Hansen's death, it was completed to a completely reworked design by others.

In 1917, Hansen was admitted to the Academy's plenar assembly. In 1920–1929, he was a member of the Academy Council. He was president of Akademisk Arkitektforening in 1919–1922. He was also involved in the publication of the magazine Architecten and headed Yegnehjælpen. In 1921, he was elected for Copenhagen City Council (vice chairman from 1925). He was a member of numerous commissions.

Hansen was created a Knight of the Order of the Dannebrog in 1914. In 1930, he was awarded the Order of the Dannebrog's Cross of Honour.

== Personal life ==
Hansen was married to the architect Agnete Frederikke Laub Hansen (1886-1970) on 16 September 1915. She was the daughter of engineer Holger Axel Hauning (1852–1931) and Johanne Arngoth Haae Laub (1859-1943). Her brother was the architect Thomas Hauning. Their mother's sister was married to Martin Nyrop. Hansen and his wife were the parents of architect Hans Henning Hansen.

== List of works ==
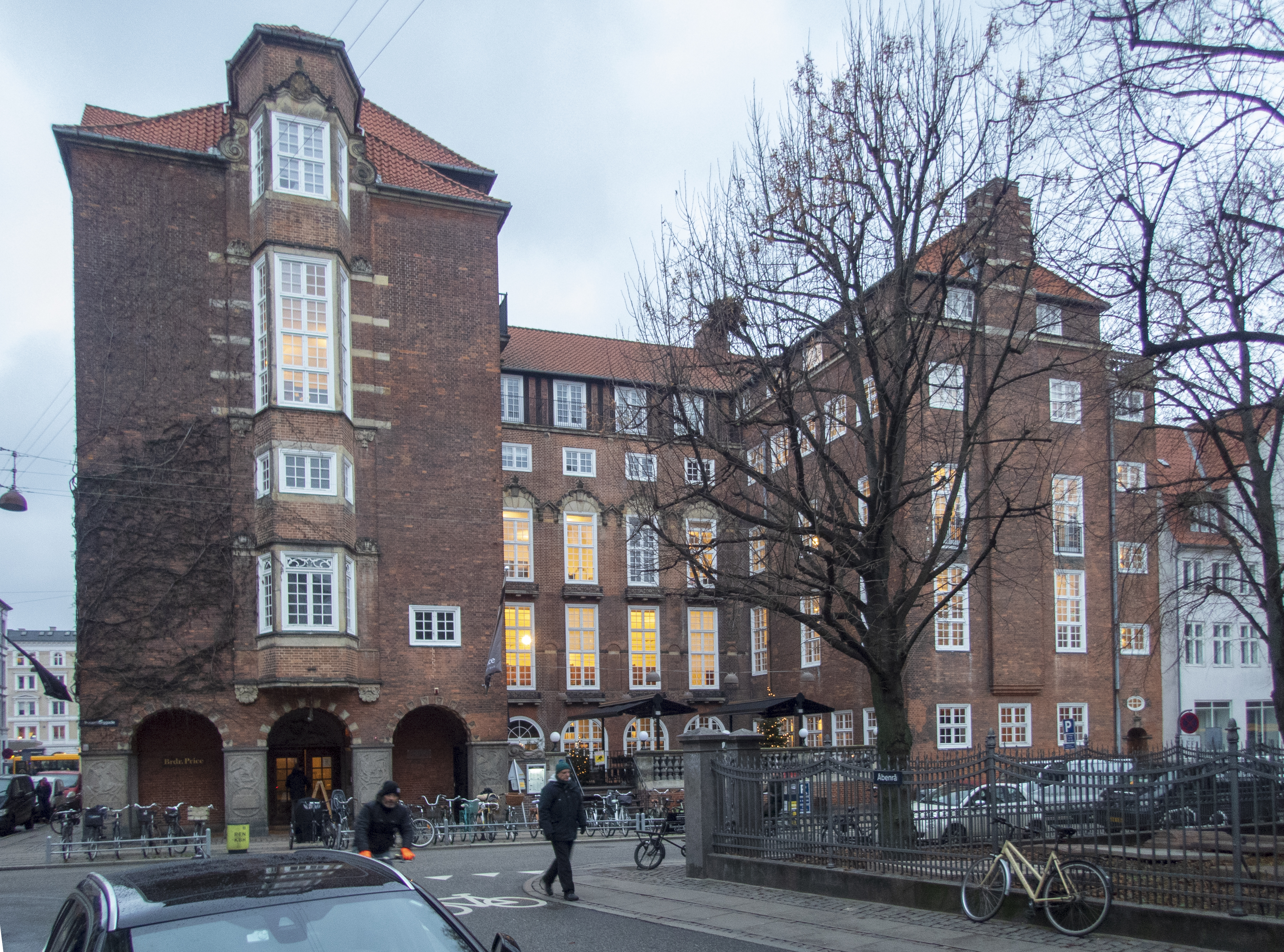
Rosenborg Annex, Copenhagen (1914–1915).

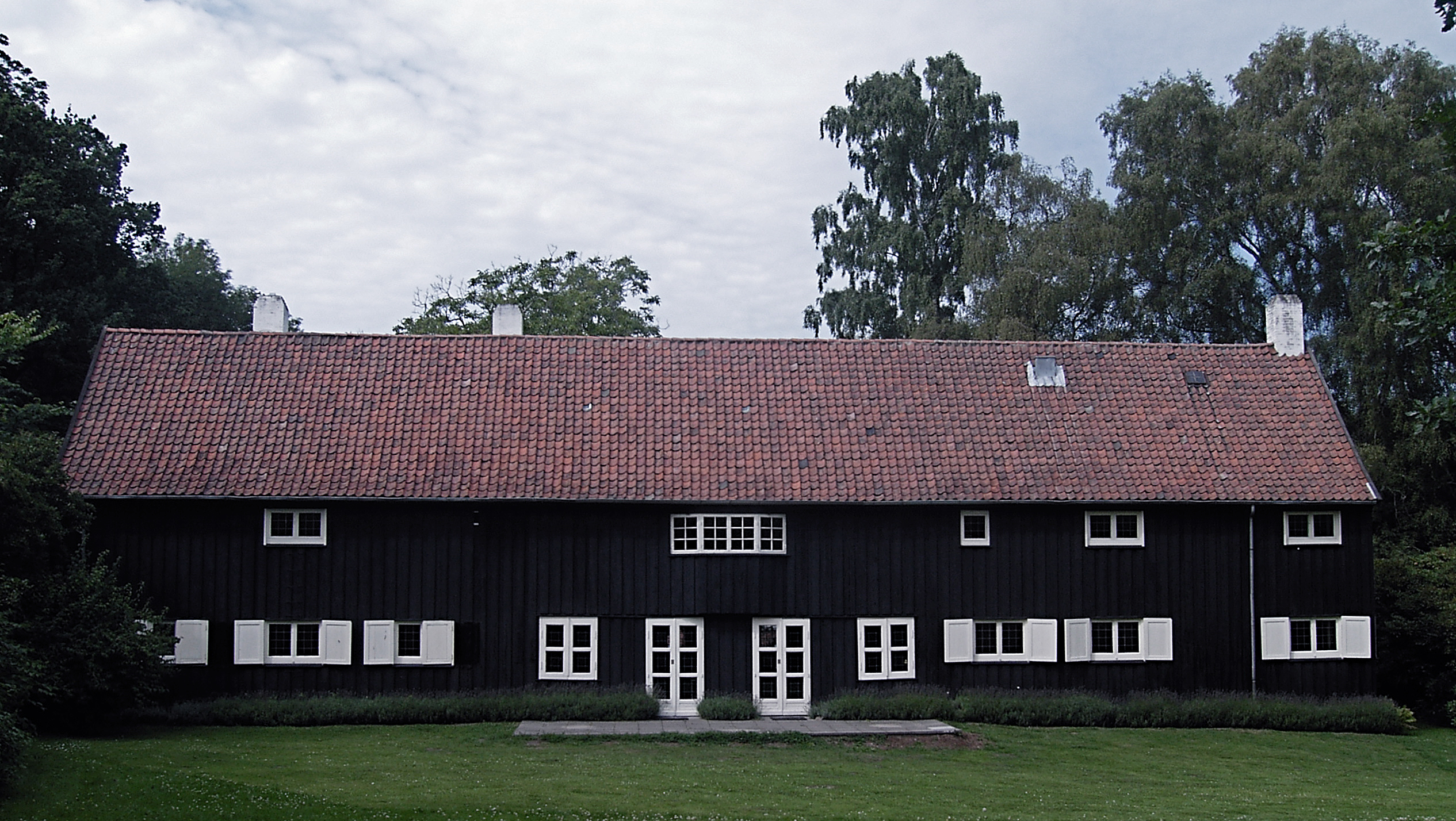
Hegnslund, Hellerup (1915–1917).

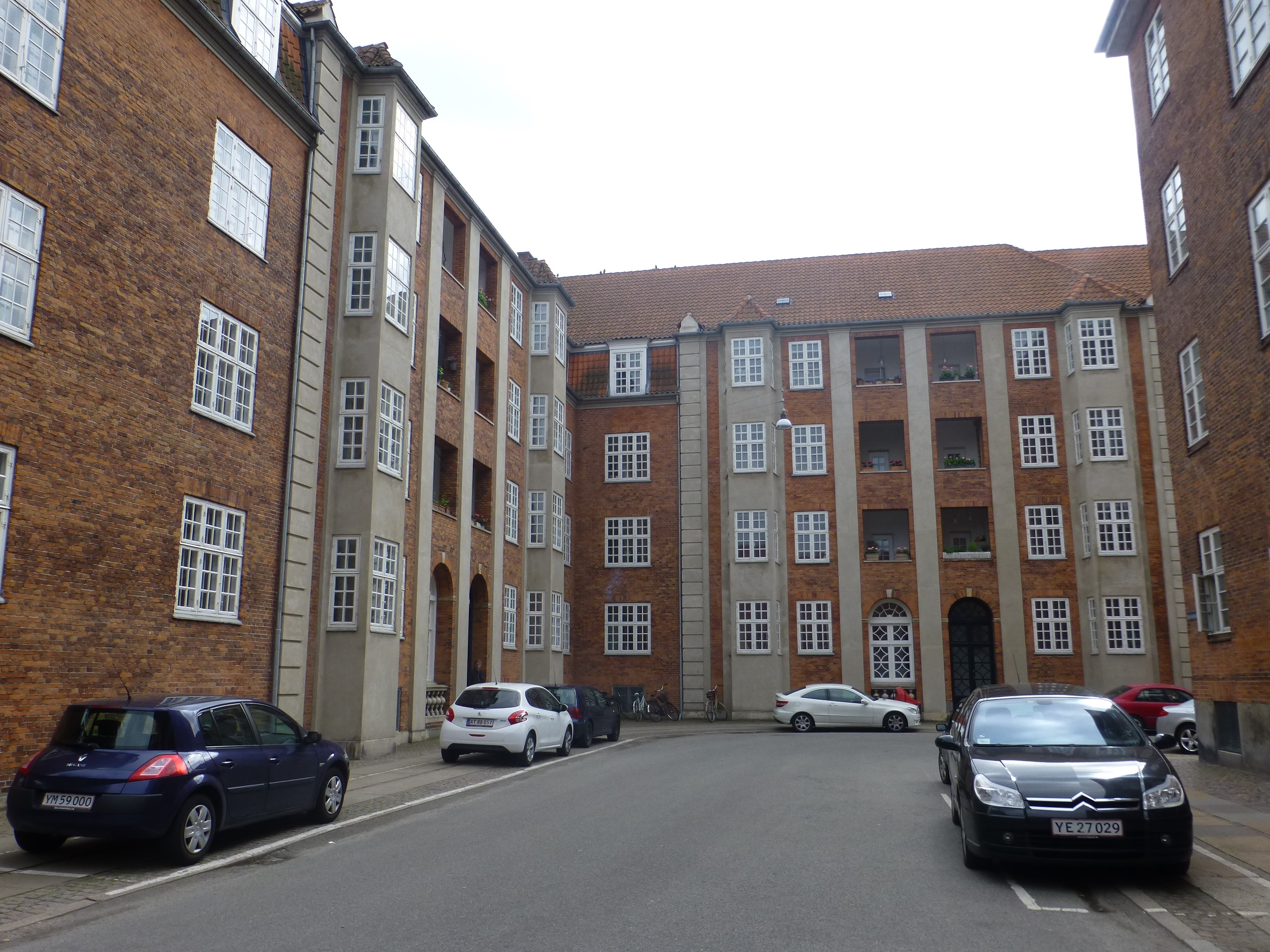
Kanslergården, Copenhagen.

- Bagsværd Boarding School, Bagsværd (1908)
- Vordingborg Barracks, Vordingborg (1912–13, with Alf Jørgensen)
- Overbys Allé 48, Valby (1913, with Louis Hygom)
- Amalie Skrams Alle 1, Valby (1914, with Louis Hygom)
- Danish pavillion, 1914 Balti Exhibition, Malmö, Sweden (1914, demolished)
- Skovbogårds Allé 4 and 6, Valby (1914)
- Tipperary, Springforbi, Copenhagen (1914–15, listed 2001)
- Borgerbo 1–7, Amager (1914, with Louis Hygom, awarded Brygger Jacobsens Præmie)
- Amalie Skrams Allé 4, Valby (1915, with Louis Hygom)
- Tschernings allé 10, Valby (1917)
- Rosenborg Annex, Rosenborggade, Copenhagen (1915–17, listed 1979)
- Belvedere, Kystvej 44, Hornbæk (1916–17)
- House for Emil Rubow, Limhamn, Sweden (1917)
- Kanslergaarden, Copenhagen (1918–19, listed 2001)
- Husvildeboliger af træ, Vigerslev Allé, Copenhagen (1918–19, demolished)
- Genforeningspladsen 1-15, Copenhagen (1919–20)
- Valby Langgade 19, Valby (1920)
- Lundeskovsvej 6 and 8, Hellerup (1921)
- Vilhelm Thomsens Allé 5-7, 4-40, Copenhagen (1921)
- Dronningmølle Avlsgård (1923)
- Vibekevang, Copenhagen (1924–25)
- Skipperforeningens Stiftelse, Copenhagen (1928)
- Søholm Park 7, Hellerup (1927)
- Trinitatis Rectory, Copenhagen (1928, with Thomas Havning)
- Antoinettevej 4, Valby (1929)
- Solgaarden, Copenhagen (1929–31, awarded the Bissens Præmie)
- Strandboulevarden 11-13, Classensgade 59-67, and Willemoesgade 76, Copenhagen (1930)
- Ordrup velodrome, Ordrup (1930–31, demolished)
- Høyrups Allé 37, Hellerup (1931)
- Østerbrogade 51-53, Copenhagen (1931–32)
- Stockholmsgade 23, Copenhagen (1932)
- Grønningen 3, Copenhagen (1933)
- Ny Stokkerup, Springforbi (1934)
- Strandøre 18, Østerbro (1934)
- Bjerregårdsvej 3, Valby (1936)
- Extension of Alderstrøst, Copenhagen (1937–38)
- Haandværkerhaven, Emdrup (competition 1936, 1940)
- Efterslægtsselskabets Skole, Hyrdevangen 62 (inaugurated 1940)
- Københavns Maskinistskole, Jagtvej 163, Copenhagen (1941, with Carl H. Nimb)
- Pavilion, Bjerregårdsvej 5, Valby (1945)
- Frederiksberg Town Hall (1st prize in 1935, started 1941–1942, reworked and completed by Helge Holm and Carl H. Nimb 1949–53)

=== Adaptions and refurbishments ===
- Johan Borups Højskole (assembly hall etx), Copenhagen (1927)
