= Rosenborggade 19 =

Listed buildings in Copenhagen

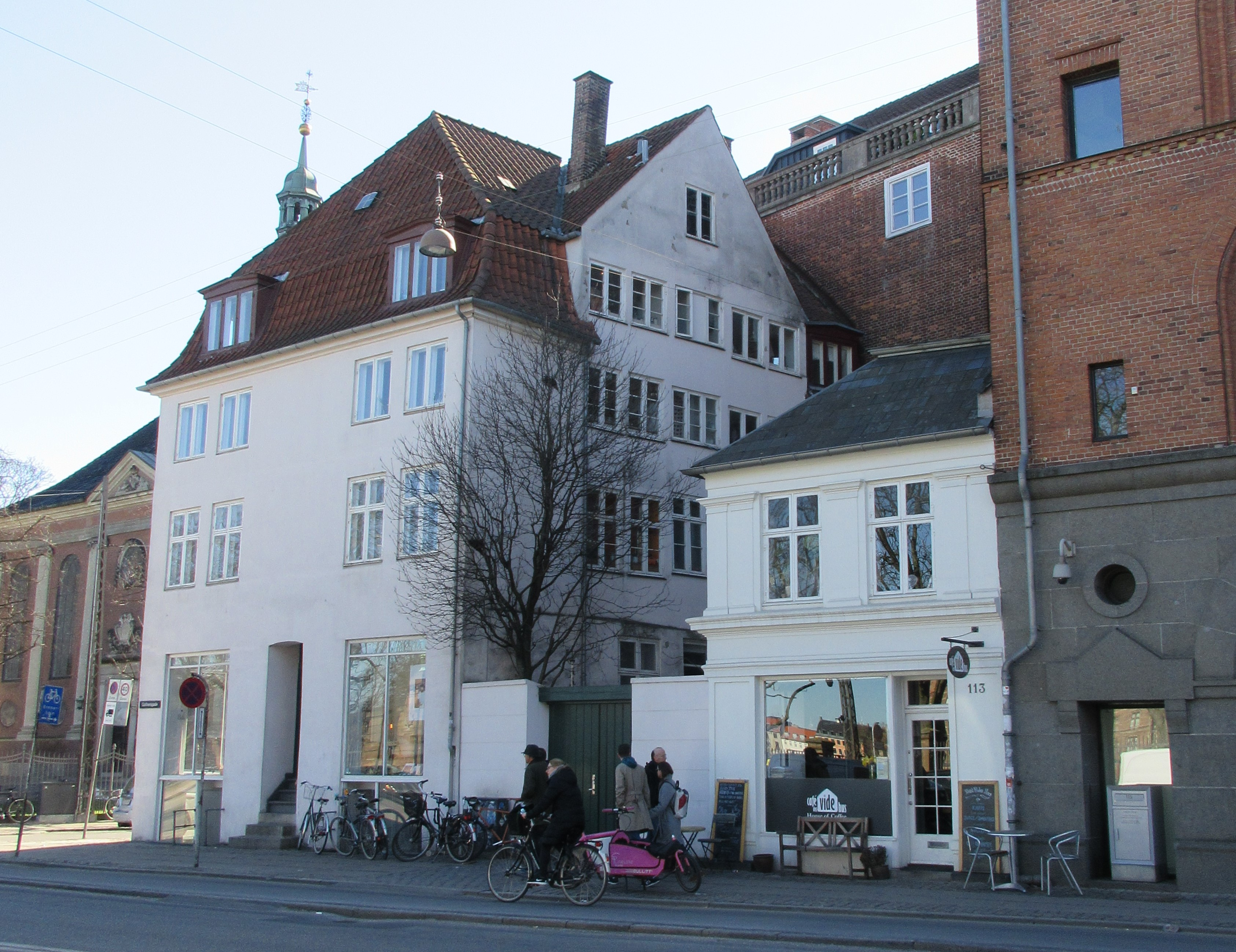
- Interactive map of the Rosenborggade 19 area

General information
- Location: Copenhagen, Denmark
- Coordinates: 55°41′2.72″N 12°34′29.17″E
- Completed: 1766
- Renovated: 1990

Rosenborggade 19 is an 18th-century property situated at the corner of Rosenborggade and Gothersgade, opposite Rosenborg Castle and next to the Reformed Church, in the Old Town of Copenhagen, Denmark. It was expanded with a detached two-storey building at Gothersgade 113 in 1825. The two buildings were both listed in the Danish registry of protected buildings and places in 1987.

== History ==
=== 17th and 18th centuries ===
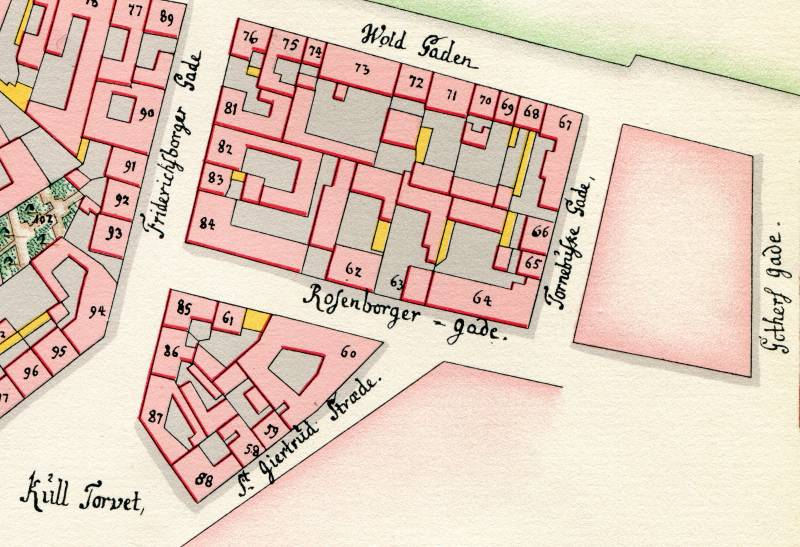
The site seen furthest to the right on a detail from Gedde's map of Rosenborg Quarter, 1757

The property was made up of two separate properties in the late 17th century. One of them was listed as No. 242 in Rosenborg Quarter in Copenhagen's first cadastre of 1689 and was at that time owned by Niels Thom. The other one was listed as No. 243 and belonged to Christen Hansen.

The two properties were listed as No. 218 (old No. 243) and No. 233 (old No. 242) in the new cadastre of 1756 and were at that time both owned by Paul Friis. They were not marked on Christian Gedde's map of Rosenborg Quarter. The block was at this point still referred to as "the Reformed Church's empty lot".

The current corner building on the site was constructed in 1766 by master carpenter Jacob Iwers.

=== 19th century ===
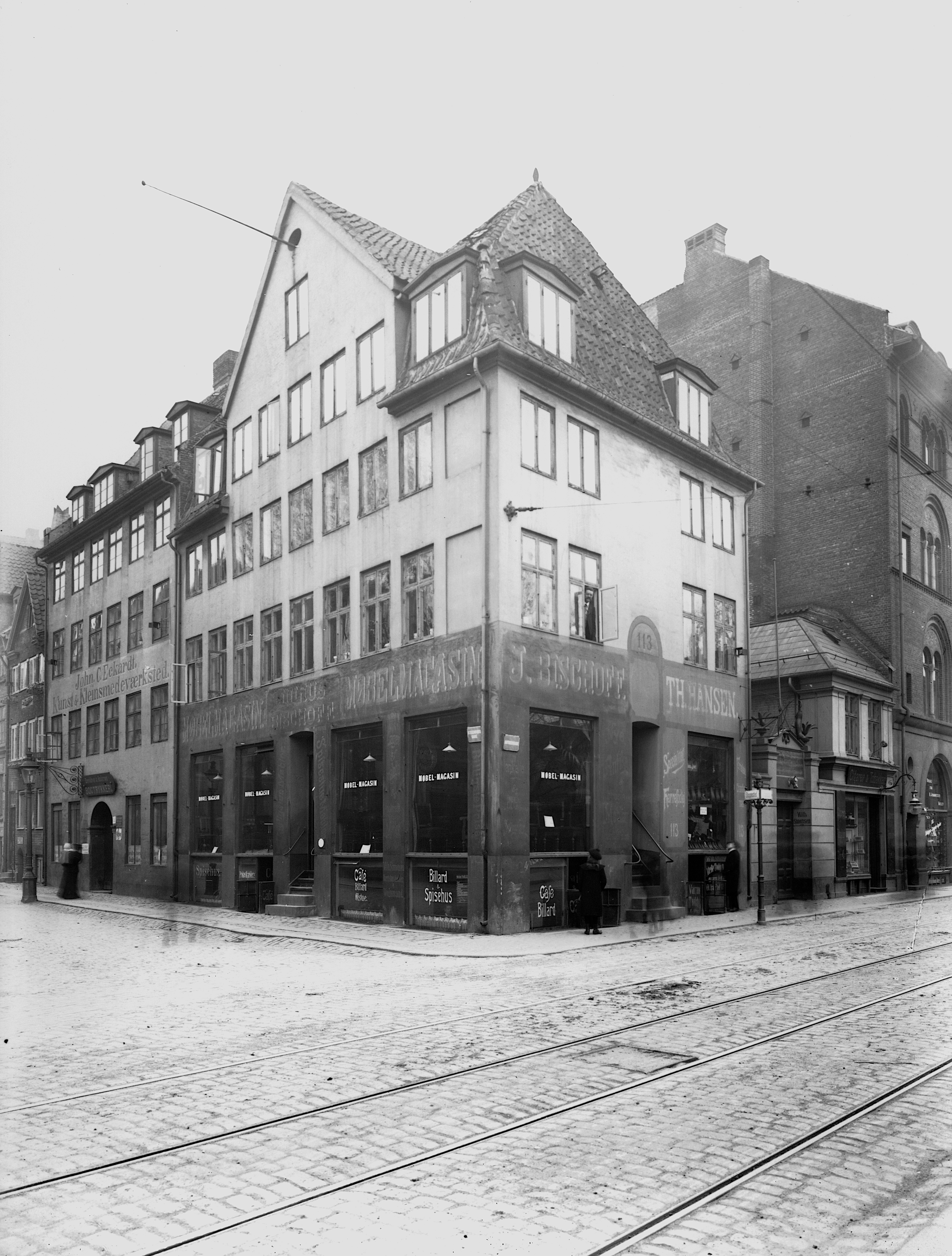
The building in 1906.

The property was listed as No. 250 in the new cadastre of 1806. It was at that time owned by Christian Stich.

At the time of the 1840 census, No. 250 was home to 34 residents. Jens Andres Godtlibsen, a master tailor, resided on the ground floor to the left with his wife Mgrete Lovise Vahler, their four-year-old son and one maid. Augosta Lovise Drewesen, a widow needleworker, resided on the first floor to the right. Olaus Frederich Høsted, a shoemaker, resided on the second floor to the left with his wife Daarthe Sesilie Jørgensen, the housekeeper Marie Steinman, Steinman's eight-year-old son and two lodgers. Emma Jiansen and Magtelene Juliane Wendel, two needleworkers, resided in the apartment on the second floor to the right. Johan Lauritz Petersen, a master joiner and lieutenant in the Copenhagen Fire Corps, resided on the third floor with his wife Anne Hollem, their three children (aged 12 to 21), a maid and four employees in his joiner's business (three of them apprentices). Mads Petersen, proprietor of a tavern in the basement, resided in the associated dwelling with his wife Anne Chrestinne Brun, their two children (aged 14 and 16) and three lodgers/workmen). Johanne Frederike Flysser, a 72-year-old widow, resided in the basement to the left with her two daughters (aged 33 and 37).

=== 20th century ===
The property was refurbished in 1990 by the architect Mogens Didriksen (1918–1991). It was still owned by his widow Grete Kristine Ellinor Didriksen as of 2009. Galleri 19 was located in the basement from the early 1980s until 2011.

== Architecture ==
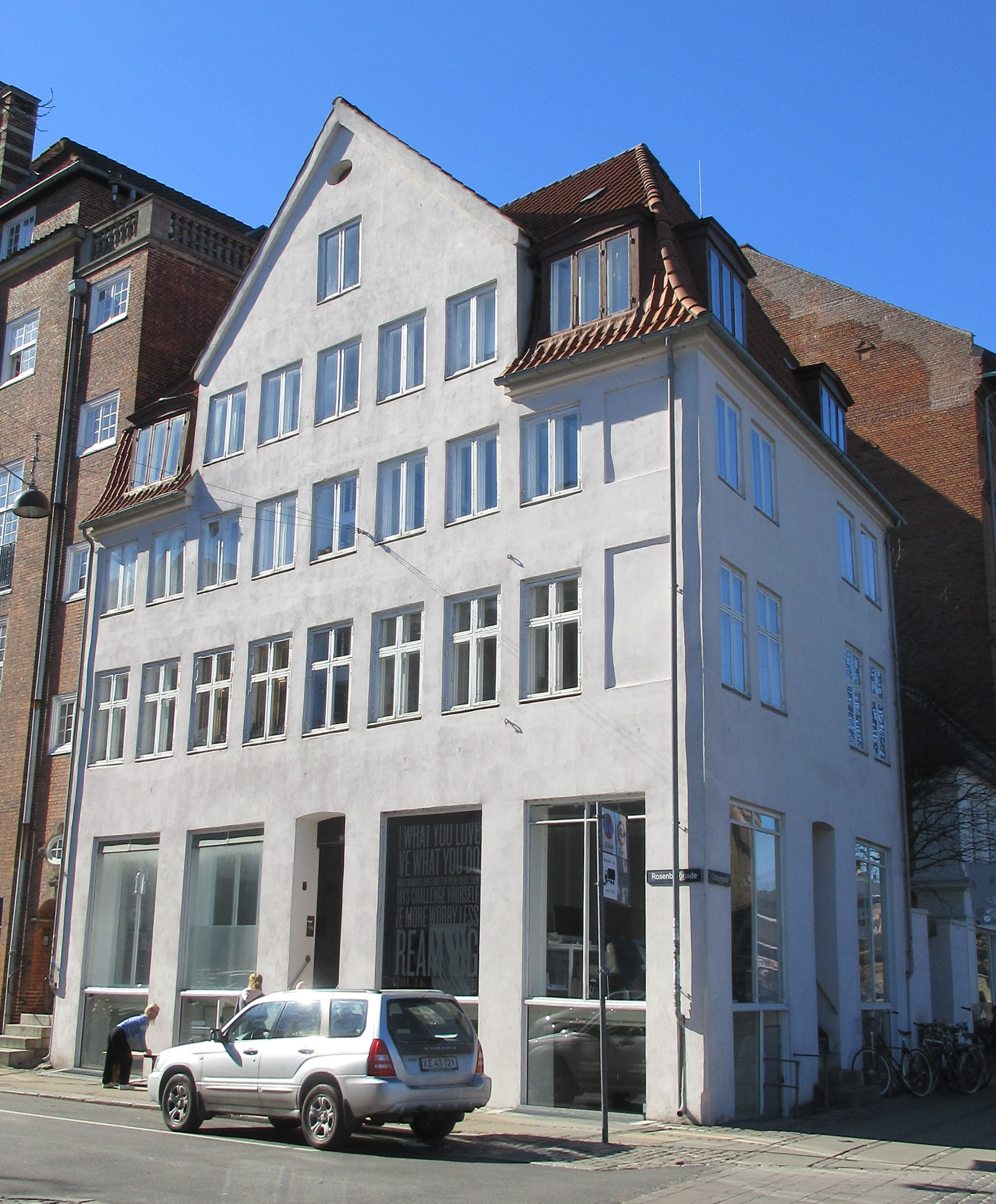
The facade on Rosenborggade.

The corner building is constructed with three storeys over a walk-out basement. It has a nine-bay-long facade towards Rosenborggade and a facade just five bays long towards Gothersgade. The facade on Rosenborggade in the facade towards the yard are both crowned by a five-bay gabled wall dormer.

== Today ==
There is a café in the basement of Rosenborggade 19. Another café is located on the ground floor of Gothersgade 113.
