= Tornebuskegade =

Street in Copenhagen, Denmark

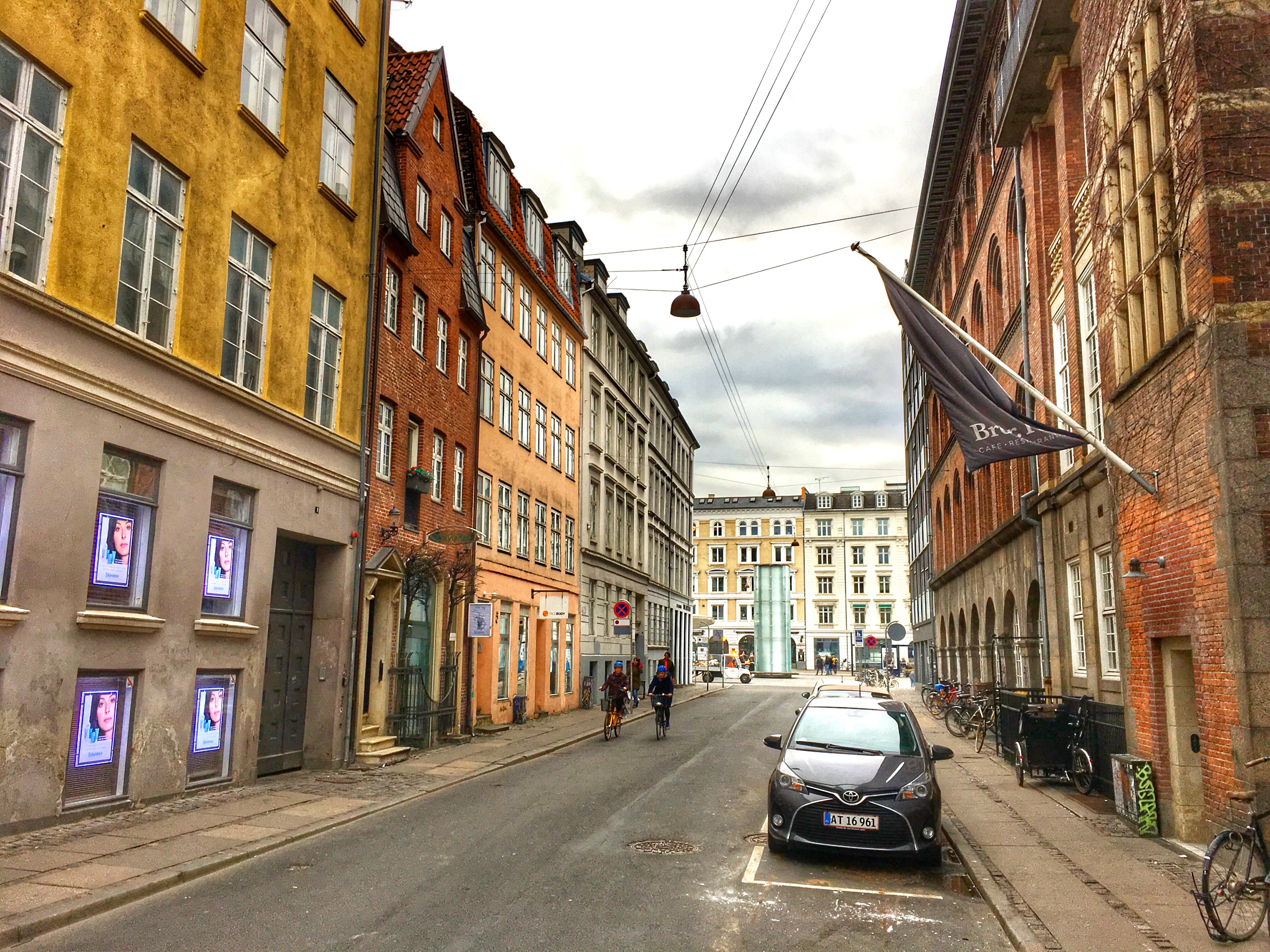
- Interactive map of Tornebuskegade
- Length: 70
- Location: Indre By, Copenhagen, Denmark
- Postal code: 1131
- Coordinates: 55°41′2.06″N 12°34′26.08″E

Tornebuskegade is a street in the Old Town of Copenhagen, Denmark. It runs from Rosenborggade in the south to Nørre Voldgade in the north.

== History ==
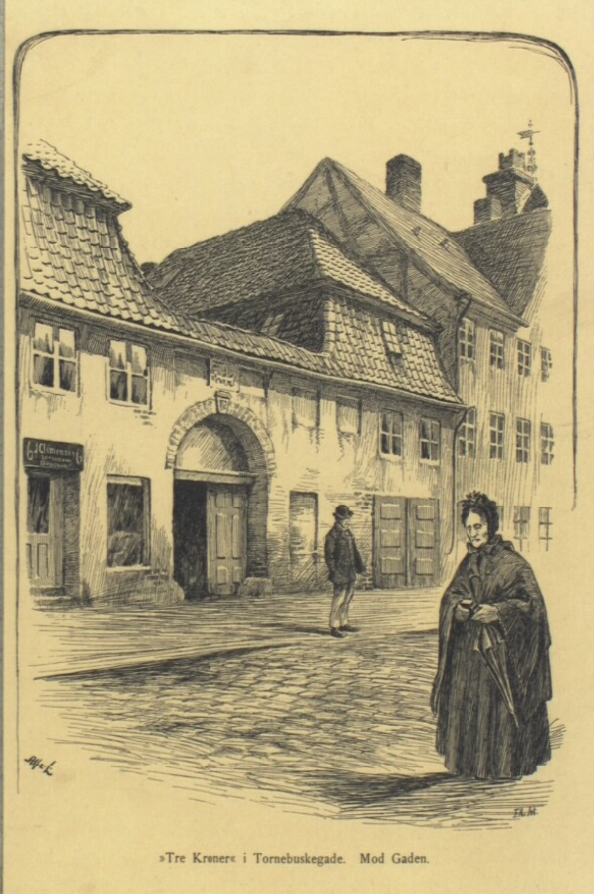
The Trekroner Gusthouse at No. 6, drawing by Alfred Larsen

The name of the street is most likely a reference to the spiny shrubs that had until then dominated the undeveloped area just inside the city's North Rampart (along present-day Nørre Voldgade) and East Rampart (along present-day Gothersgade met. The street was together with Rosenborggade laid out in the 1650s after the area known as New Copenhagen had been incorporated in the fortified city by moving the East Rampart.

All the buildings in the southern part of the street were destroyed in the Copenhagen Fire of 1728. One of them was the Trekroner Guesthouse but it was later rebuilt. Its buildings were demolished in 1918.

== Buildings ==
The property at Tornebuskegade 1 / Rosenborggade 7-9 was built in 1847 for master tanner Johan Julius Gram. The corner building and a warehouse in the courtyard were listed on the Danish registry of protected buildings and places in 1975. The corner building at Tornebuskegade 9 / Nørre Voldgade 104 is from 1857 and was built for master joiner Josias Jøhnke. It was also listed in 1975.

== Gallery ==
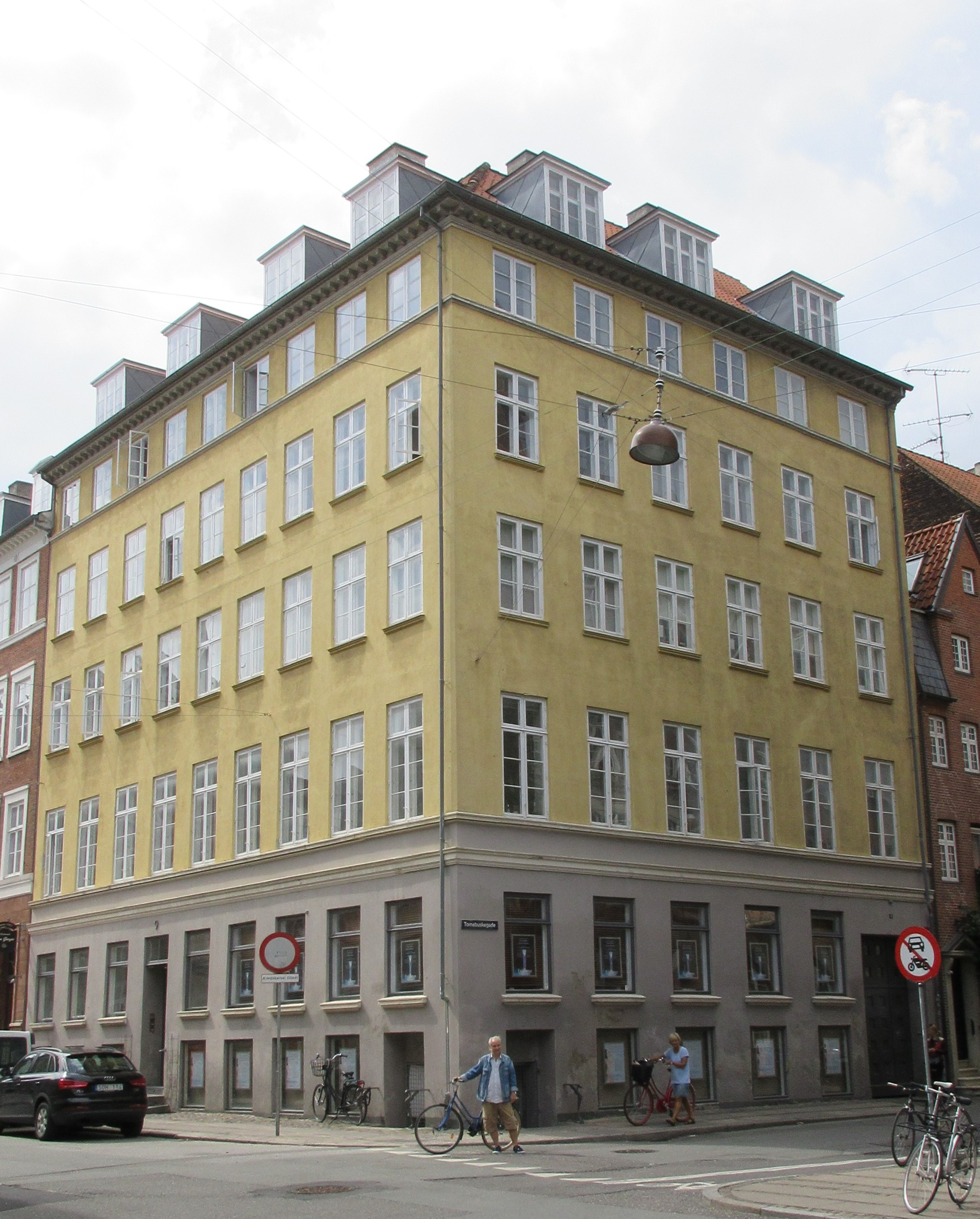
Tornebuskegade 1/Rosenborggade 7

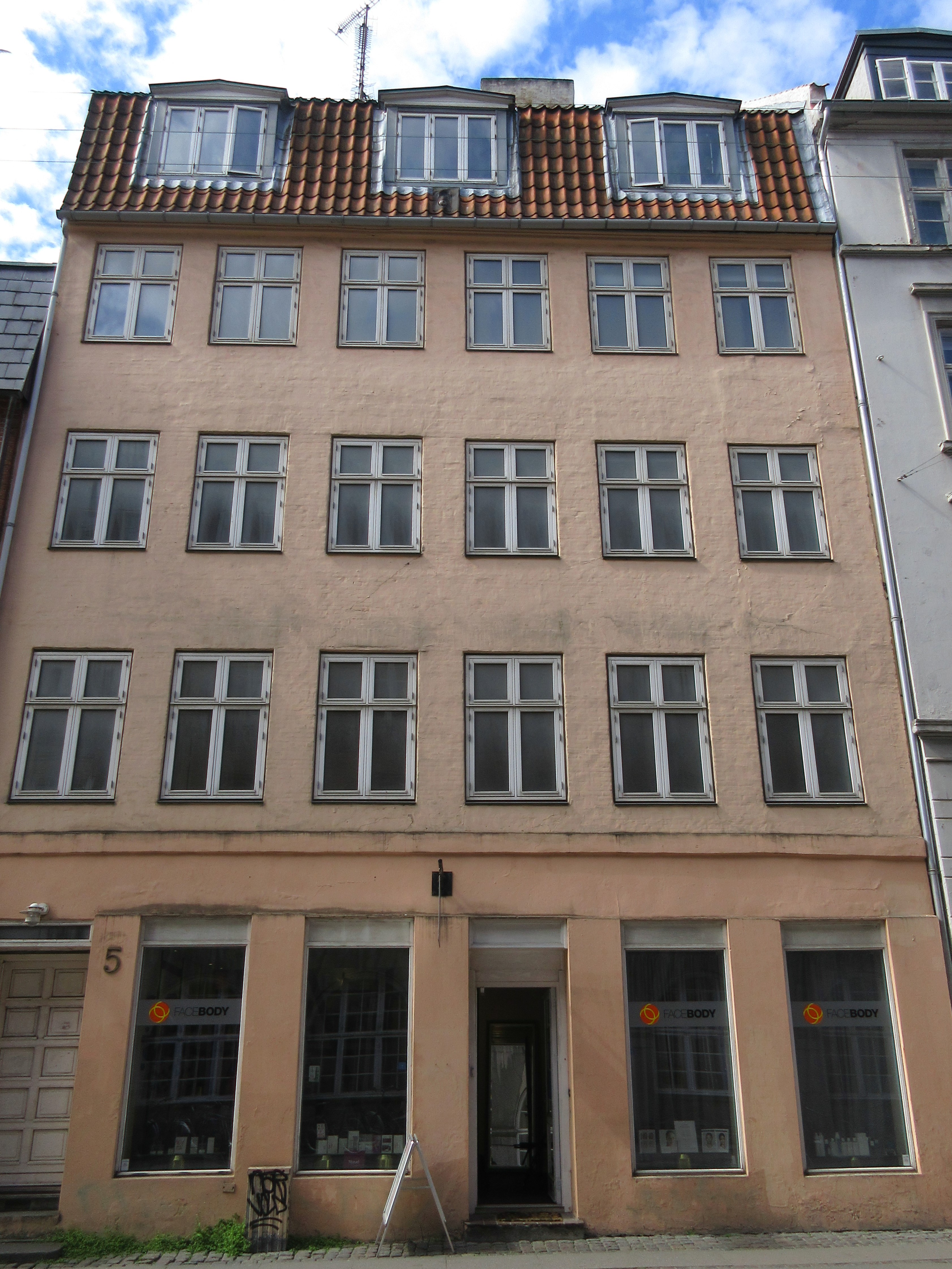
Tornebuskegade 5
