= Kanslergården =

Listed building in Copenhagen, Denmark

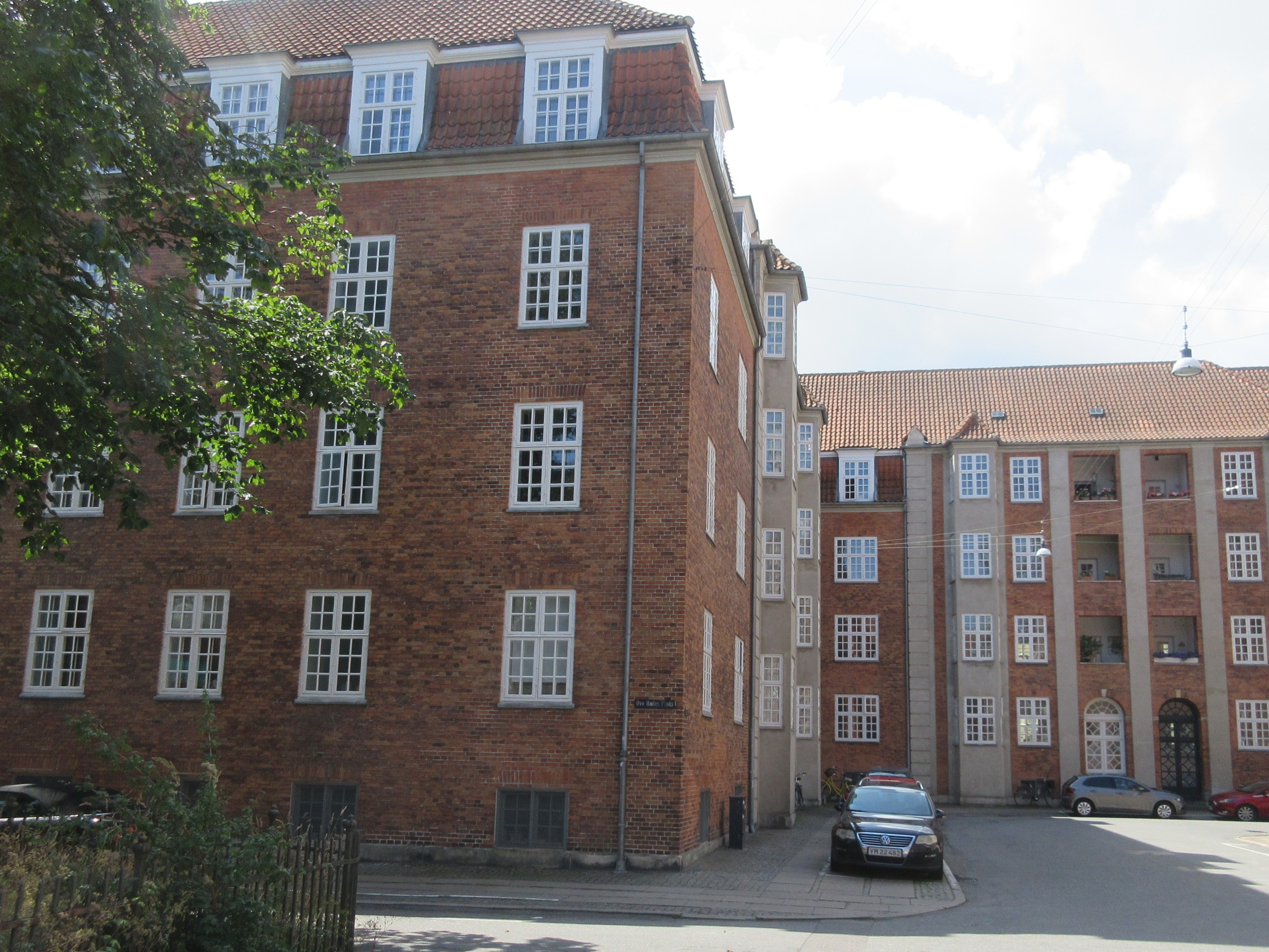
- Interactive map of the Kanslergården area

General information
- Architectural style: Baroque Revival
- Location: Copenhagen, Denmark
- Coordinates: 55°42′27.68″N 12°34′15.46″E
- Completed: 1919

Design and construction
- Architect: Henning Hansen

Kanslergården is a housing estate in the Østerbro district of Copenhagen, Denmark. Constructed in 1919 to designs by Henning Hansen, with its imposing Baroque Revival architecture and large apartments, it set a new standard for public housing in the city. It was listed on the Danish register of protected buildings and places in 2001. In the same year, it was converted into condominiums.

The building complex forms an L-shaped perimeter block, whose central courtyard is divided in two by a cross wing. It is surrounded by the namesake street Kanslergade, Serridslevvej, and the small greenspace Ove Rodes Plads. Prime minister Thorvald Stauning resided in one of the apartments in 1933 when the Kanslergade Agreement was concluded in his apartment.

== History ==
Kanslergården was constructed by the city in 1919 to be run as a rental property. It was part of an initiative directed at keeping more bourgeouis tax-payers from moving to the suburbs. The initiative was successful, as the estate was given the English nickname "pamperly" because of the elite political, cultural, and commercial residents it had in the mid 20th century.

Prime minister Thorvald Stauning resided in one of the apartments at Kanslergade 10 (now Ove Rodes Plads 1). On 29 January 1933, he hosted the political negotiations that resulted in the so-called Kanslergade Agreement. Other notable former residents include actor Poul Reumert (1919-; Serridslevvej 34 1st floor), actress Agnes Henningsen (Serridslevvej 36 3rd floor) and Peter Freuchen.

In the 1990s, Copenhagen Municipality was forced to sell all of its 20,000 municipal rental properties due to funding issues. By 1995, the housing estate had been purchased by the company Norden. In 2000, the property was designated for preservation and sold to Frederiksstaden A/S. The building was listed on the Danish register of protected buildings and places in 2011.

== Architecture ==
The estate, designed by Henning Hansen in a Baroque Revival style, primarily consists of three and four story buildings with red-tile mansard roofs. These buildings are arranged in a large L-shape, with an internal courtyard within. A transverse building divides the courtyard in two: Østergården (lit. 'East Courtyard') and Vestergården (lit. 'West Courtyard'). The exterior façades are clad in red brick with plastered columns, many of which are shaped to give the impression of quoins. Facing towards the street, the building is interrupted by internal balconies and plastered bay windows. The interior façades that face the courtyards are plastered yellow.

The building's exterior doors lead to stairwells which give access to two apartments on each floor. The estate contains approximately 100 apartments which are all about 140–220 square metres in size. Originally, they would have been laid out with a series of living rooms, bedrooms, kitchen, maid's room, a balcony facing the street, and a bathroom facing the courtyard.

== Gallery ==
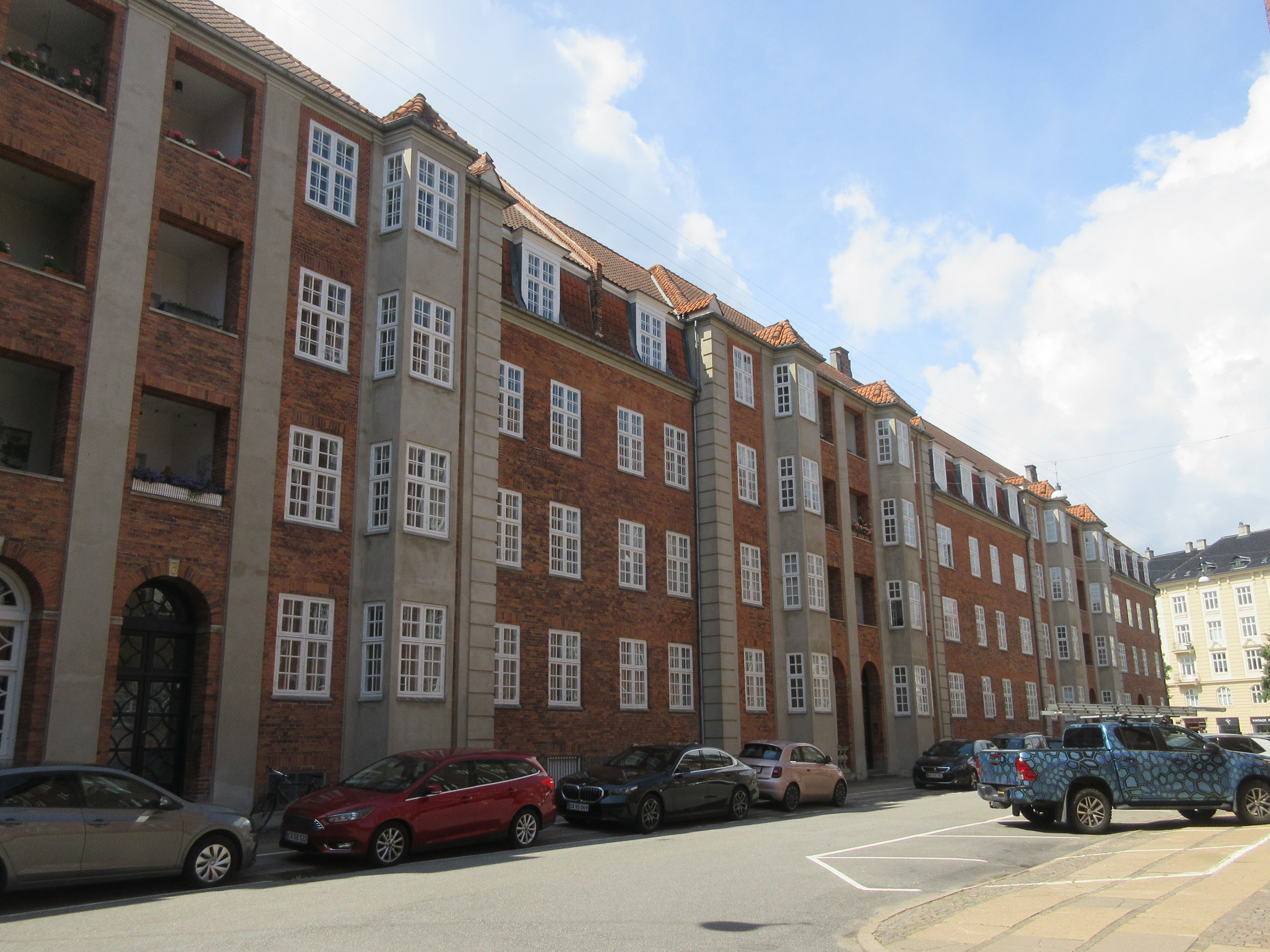
Long façade on Kanslergade

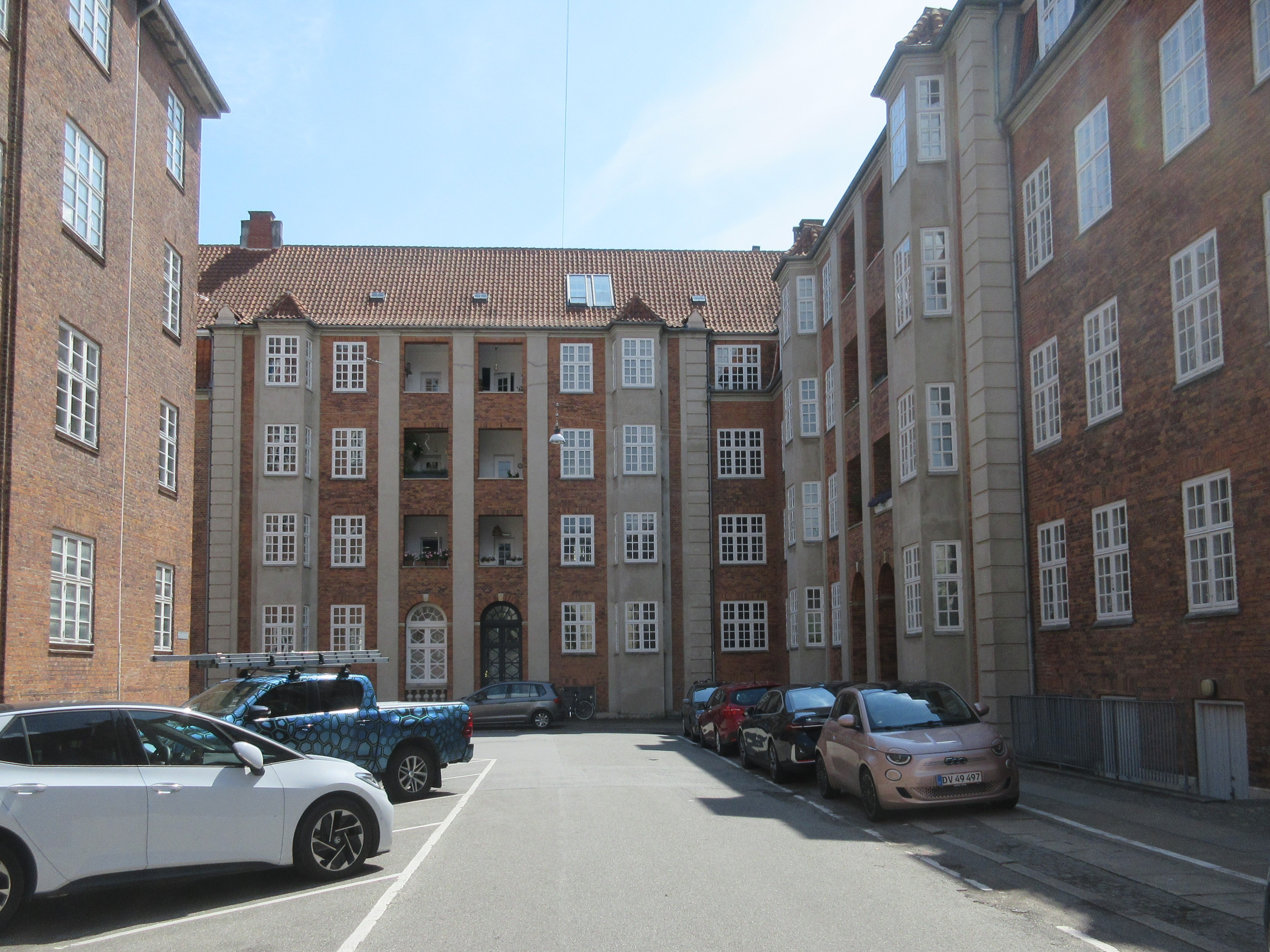
Kanslergade

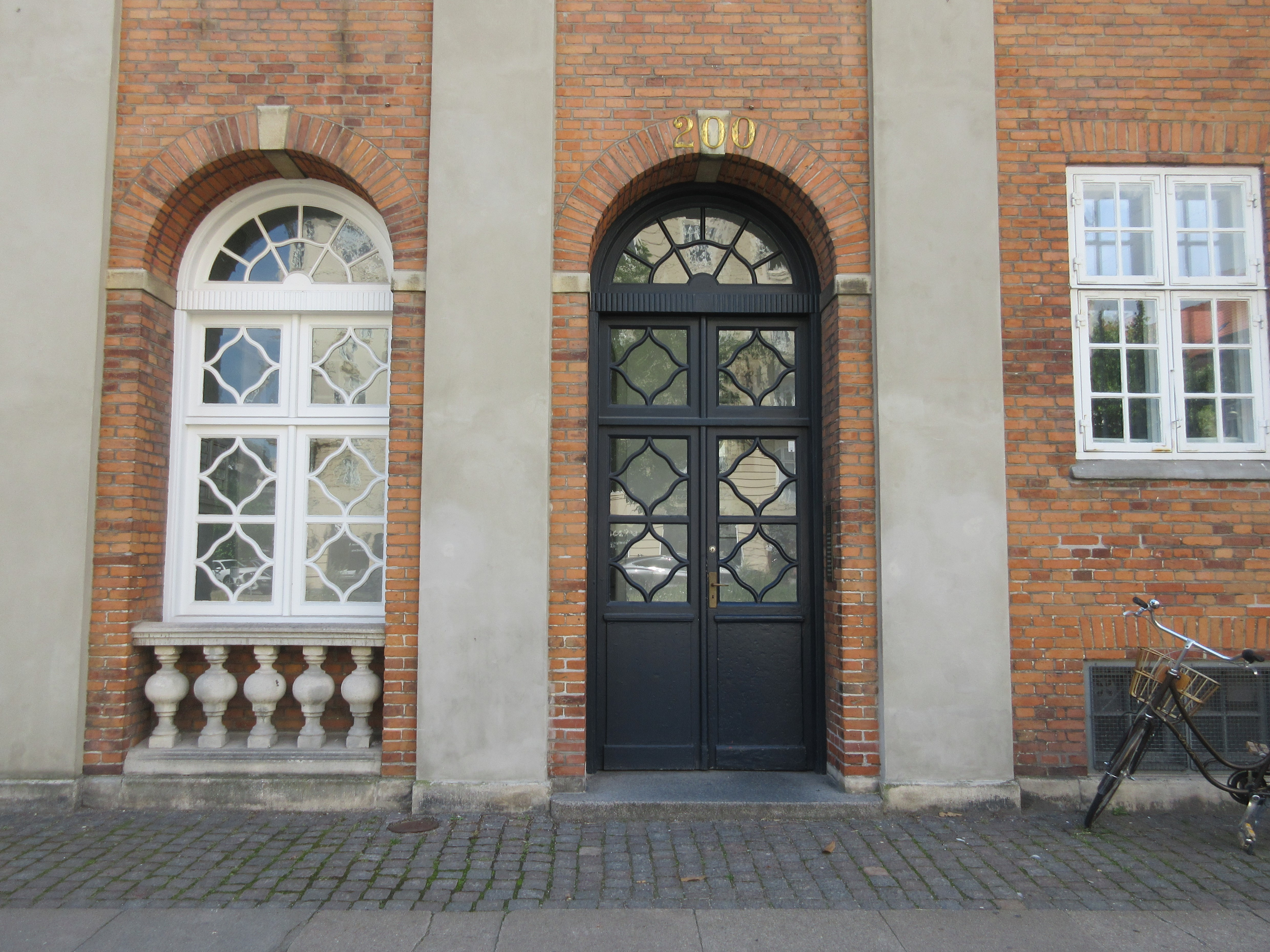
Door

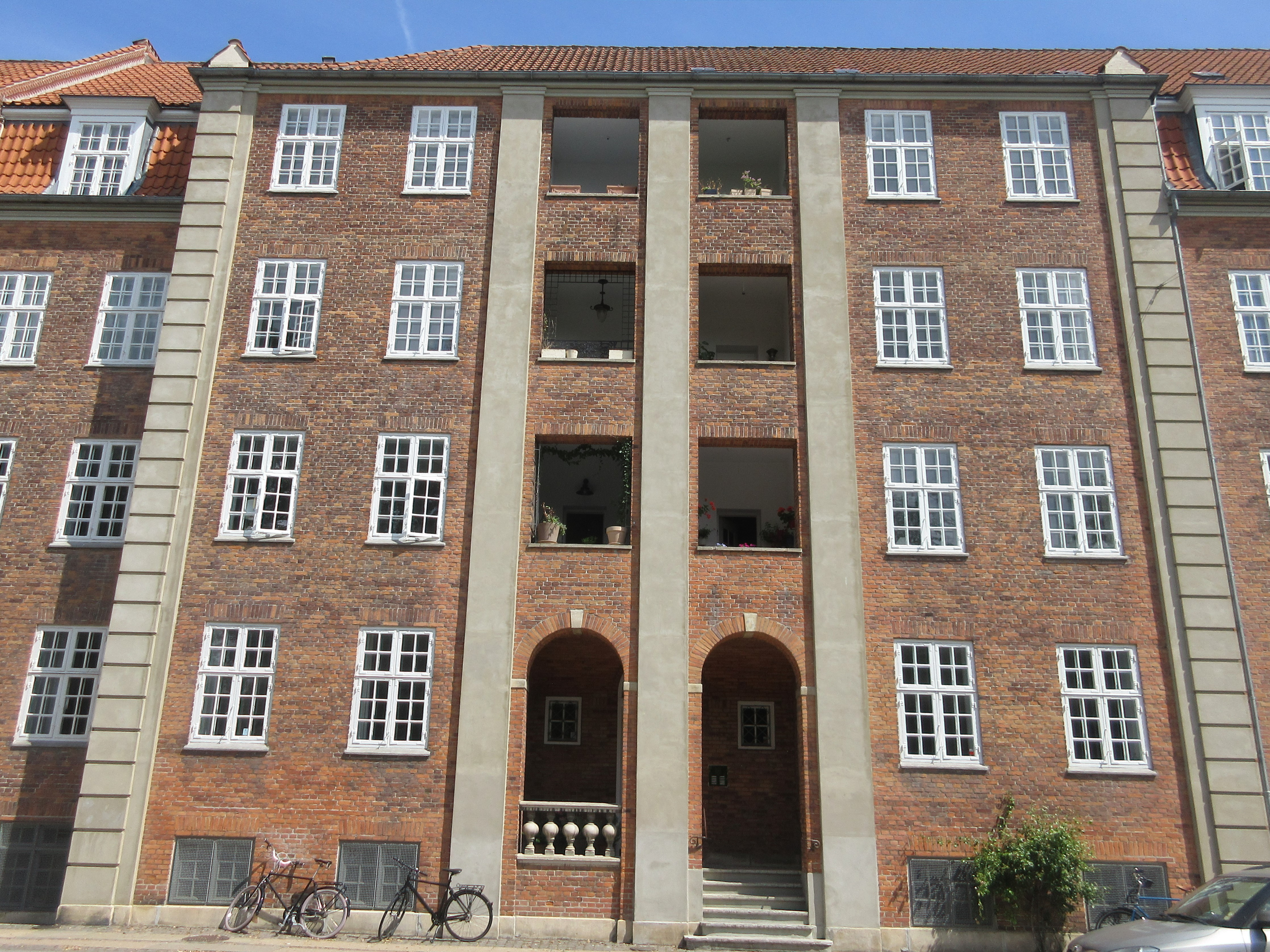
Balconies

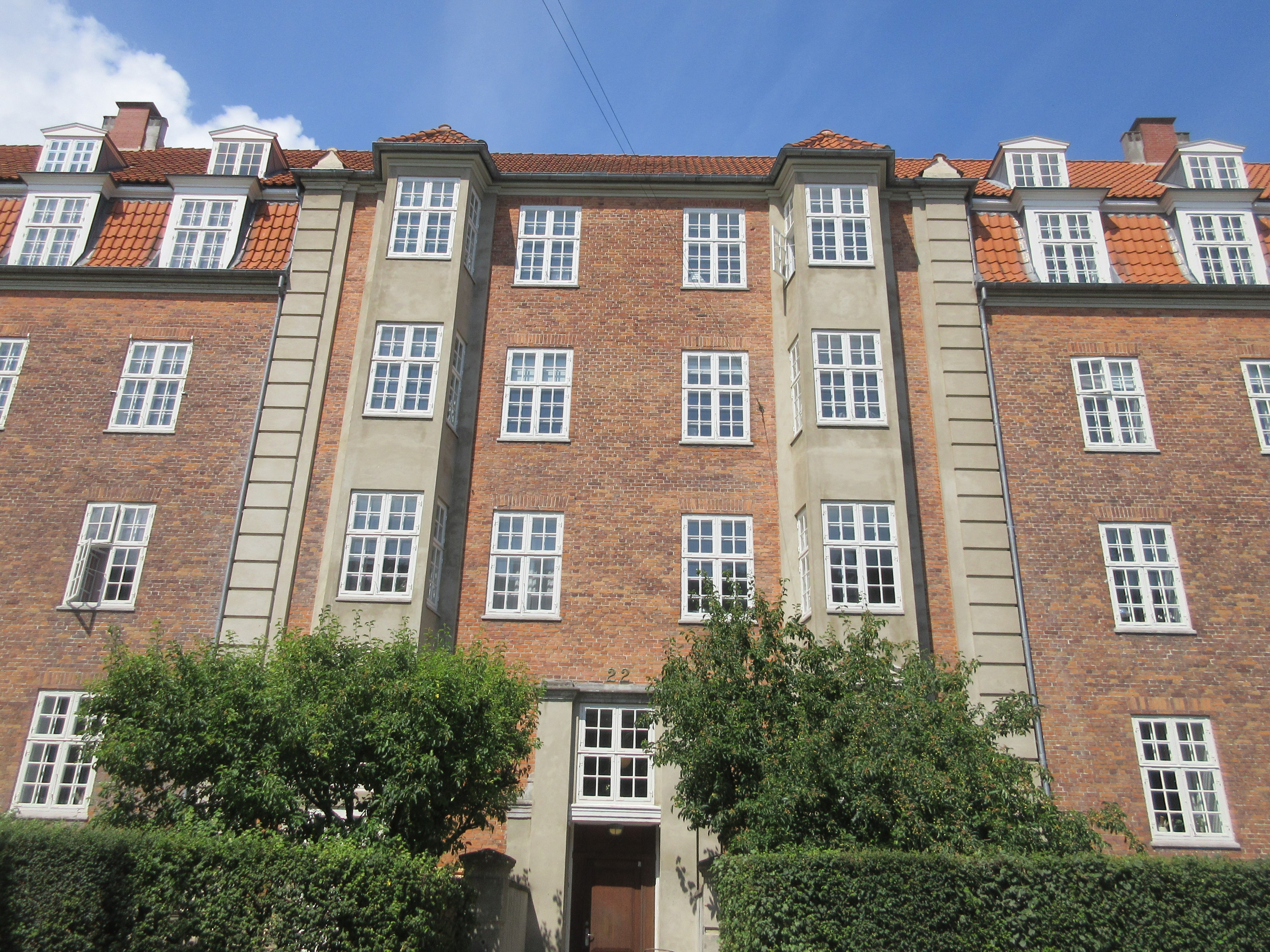
Bay windows
