= Kanslergade Agreement =

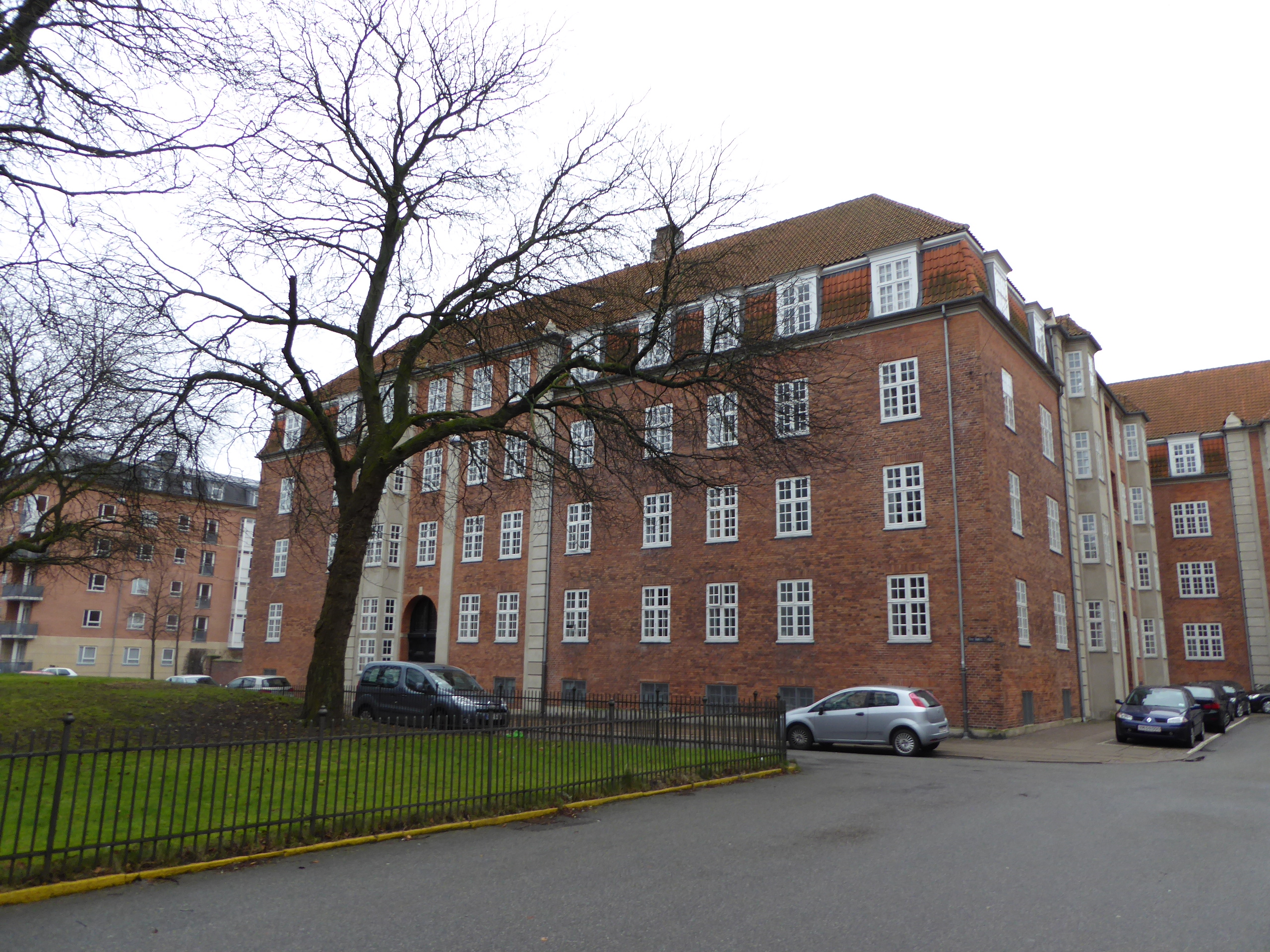
The building on Kanslergade where Stauning's apartment is located (photo 2016).

The Kanslergade Agreement (IPA: [ˈkʰænˀslɐˌkɛːðə]; Danish: Kanslergadeforliget) was a 1933 political agreement in Denmark, which laid the foundation for the Danish welfare state. It was enacted by the government of prime minister Thorvald Stauning, with social minister K.K. Steincke being its chief architect. The Kanslergade Agreement was negotiated in Stauning's apartment at Kanslergården, located on Kanslergade in Copenhagen, from which it takes its name.

The agreement was reached by Stauning's government, consisting of his own Social Democratic Party and their coalition partner the Social Liberal Party, as well as the main opposition party the Liberal Party, on 30 January 1933. The two governing parties held a narrow majority of 76 out of 149 seats in Folketinget (the lower house of Rigsdagen). However, they only had 34 out of 76 seats in Landstinget (the upper house of Rigsdagen), and thus needed the support of the Liberals, who held 27 seats in Landstinget.

The Kanslergade Agreement set in motion the reforms that would establish the Nordic model for state welfare services in Denmark. It expanded labor rights, devalued the krone, and extended state subsidies to farmers. Charges for social services were also fixed to affordable levels. As part of the agreement, the Liberal Party withdrew its objections to the social welfare model advocated by the government. The agreement was, at the time, the most extensive agreement yet in Danish politics, with the possible exception of the 1894 budget agreement.

== See also ==
- The most recent elections before the Kanslergade Agreement:
  - 1932 Danish Folketing election
  - 1932 Danish Landsting election
- History of Denmark#1901–1939
- Labor rights
- Stauning II Cabinet
- Stauning or Chaos
- Welfare state
