= Rosenborggade =

Street in Copenhagen, Denmark

Coordinates: 55.6836°N 12.5742°E

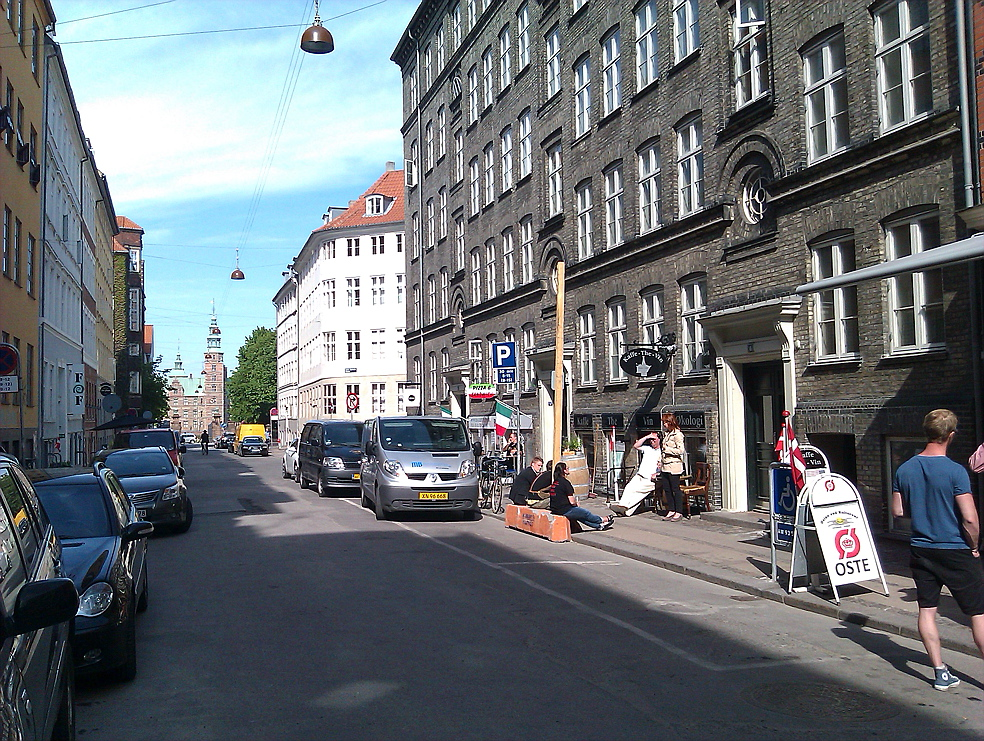
Rosenborggade with Rosenborg Castle in the background

Rosenborggade (literally "Rosenborg Street") is a street in the Old Town of Copenhagen, Denmark. It runs from the southern, pedestrianized part of Frederiksborggade in the west to Gothersgade in the east. It takes its name after Rosenborg Castle on the other side of the street.

== History ==
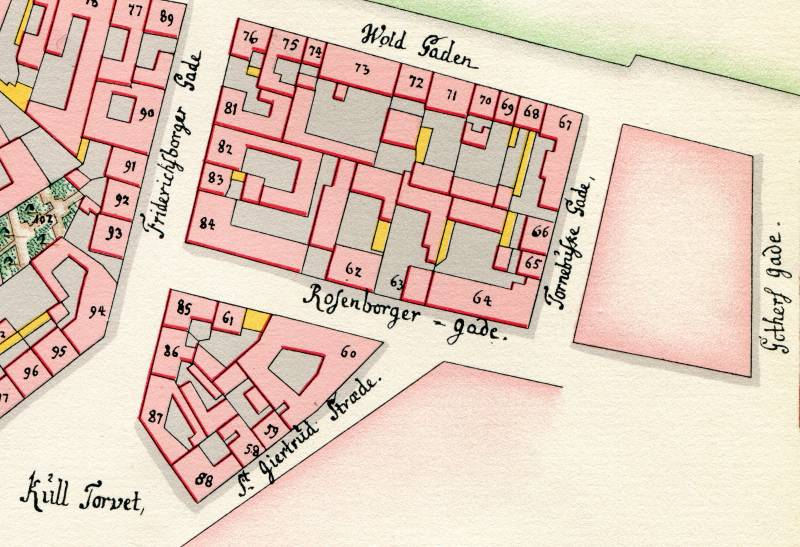
Rosenborggade seen ion Gedde's map of the East Quarter from 1757

Rosenborggade was established in 1650, just a few years after Gothersgadem then known as Ny Kongensgade, had been established along the now abandoned, old Eastern Rampart of the city's Fortification Ring.

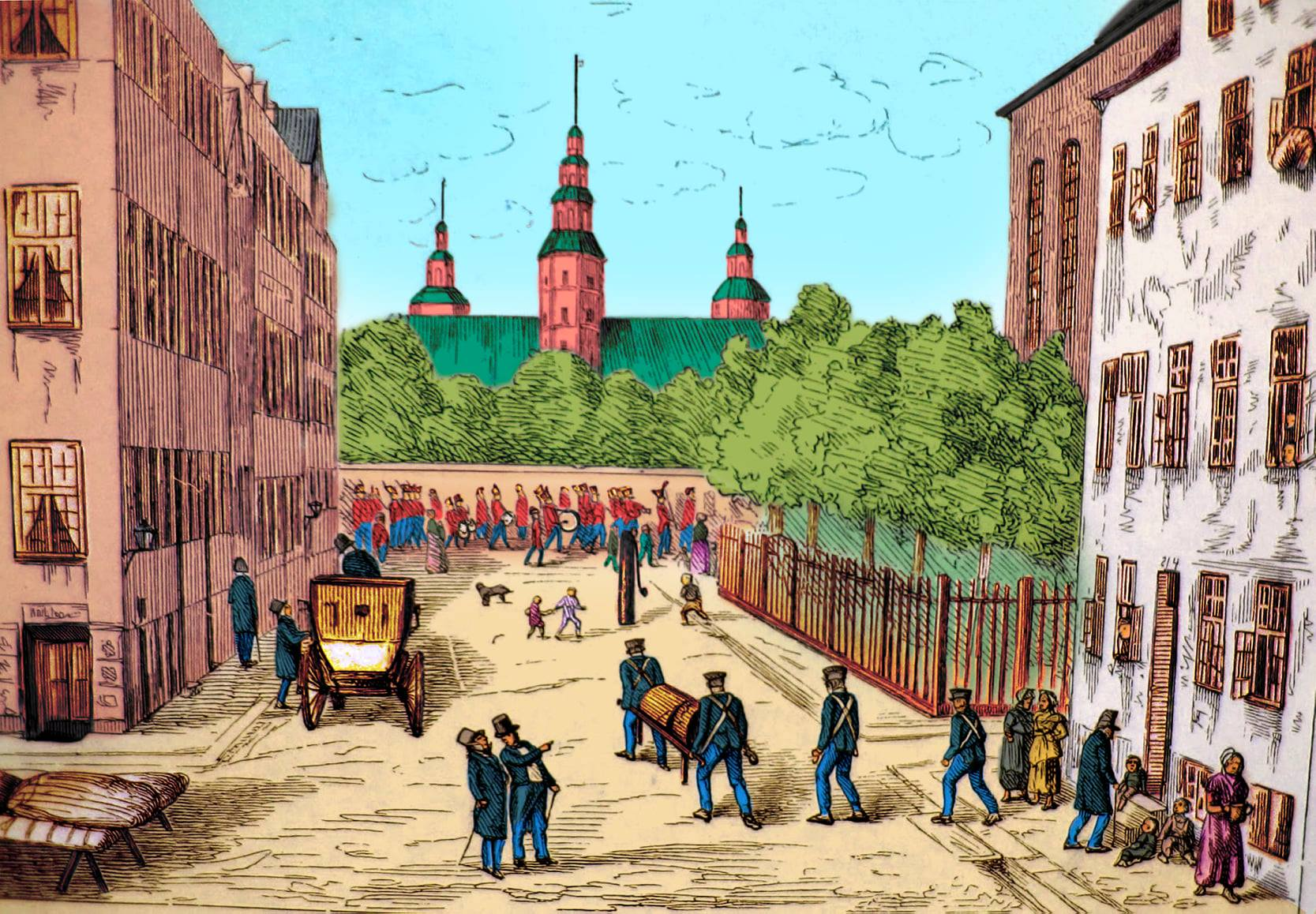
Drawing by P. C. Klæstrup showing Rosenborggade with Royal Life Guards on Gothersgade and Rosenborg Castle in the background and Pjaltenborg visible to the right

A boarding house known as Pjaltenborg, which provided accommodation for the very poorest part of the city's population, was located on the corner with Aabenraa. The cheapest option in the immensely crowded building was to spend the night standing along the wall attached to a hook by a rope under the arms. The run-down, half-timbered building was destroyed in a fire on the night between 25 and 26 March 1850.

== Notable buildings and residents ==
The building at the corner with Tornebuskegade (Rosenborggade 9/Tornebuskgade) was originally built for a brewer named Jacob Carstensen. It was expanded with two more floors for a tanner named Johan Julius Gram in 1846–1847. The neighbouring property at No. 7 was also built for him in 1847. It comprises a warehouse to the rear. Both No. 7 and 9 are listed.

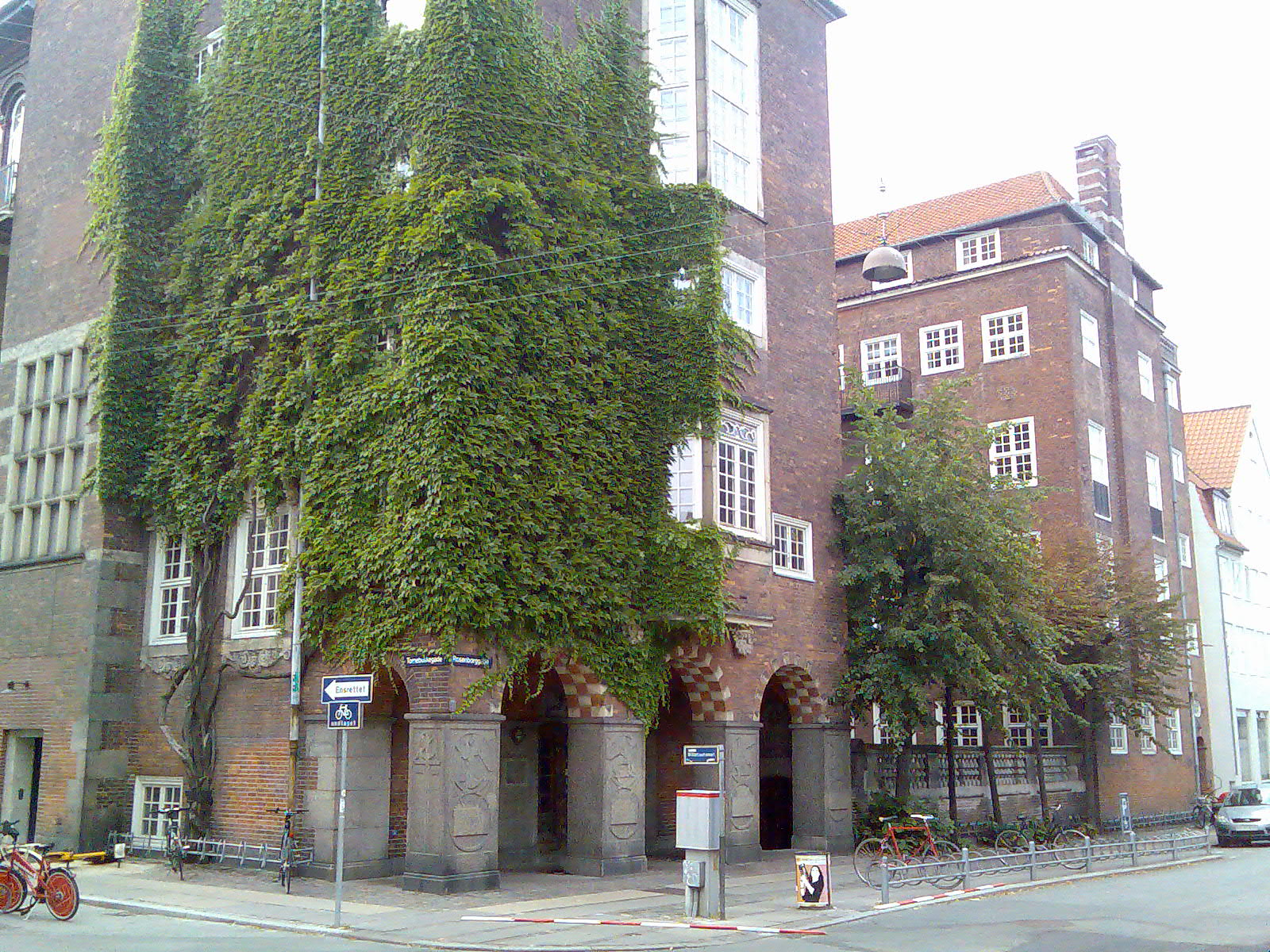
The former YMCA headquarters

The building at the corner of Åbenrå is called Pjaltenborg but has nothing in common with its predecessor but its name and location. It was completed the same year as the fire in 1850. The neighbouring building at No. 10 is from 1901. Both No. 10 and 12 are also listed.

The National Romantic buildings at No. 15-17 is an extension designed by Henning Hansen to the YMCA's headquarters on Gothersgade. The original building was designed by Jens Christian Kofoed and inaugurated on the YMCA's 22-years anniversary on 17 September 1900. Henning Hansen expanded the building with the Rosenborggade Wing in two phases in 1916-1918 and 1924. The buildings later housed the University of Copenhagen's Department of Political Science and was then known as the Rosenborg Annex.

At the corner with Frederiksborggade is a branch of the Lagkagehuset bakery chain.
