= 1841 in Denmark =

- Decades: 1820s; 1830s; 1840s; 1850s; 1860s
- See also: Other events of 1841; List of years in Denmark

Events from the year 1841 in Denmark.

== Incumbents ==
- Monarch – Christian VIII
- Prime minister – Otto Joachim

== Rvents ==
- 10 June – The wedding of Prince Frederick (CII and Duchess Caroline Mariane of Mecklenburg takes place in Copenhagen.

== Births ==
- 4 February – Edvard Petersen, painter (died 1911)
- 13 June – Julius Villiam Gudmand-Høyer, author (died 1915)
- 6 July – Christian Bayer, illustrator (died 1933)
- 16 December – Anders Andersen-Lundby, painter (died 1923)

== Deaths ==
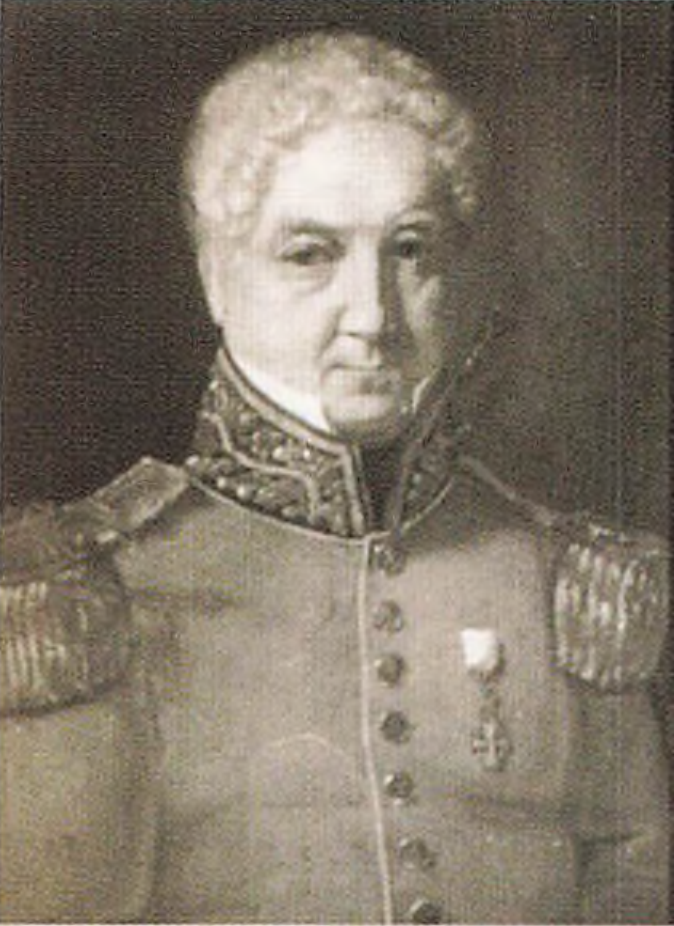
Johannes Rehling.

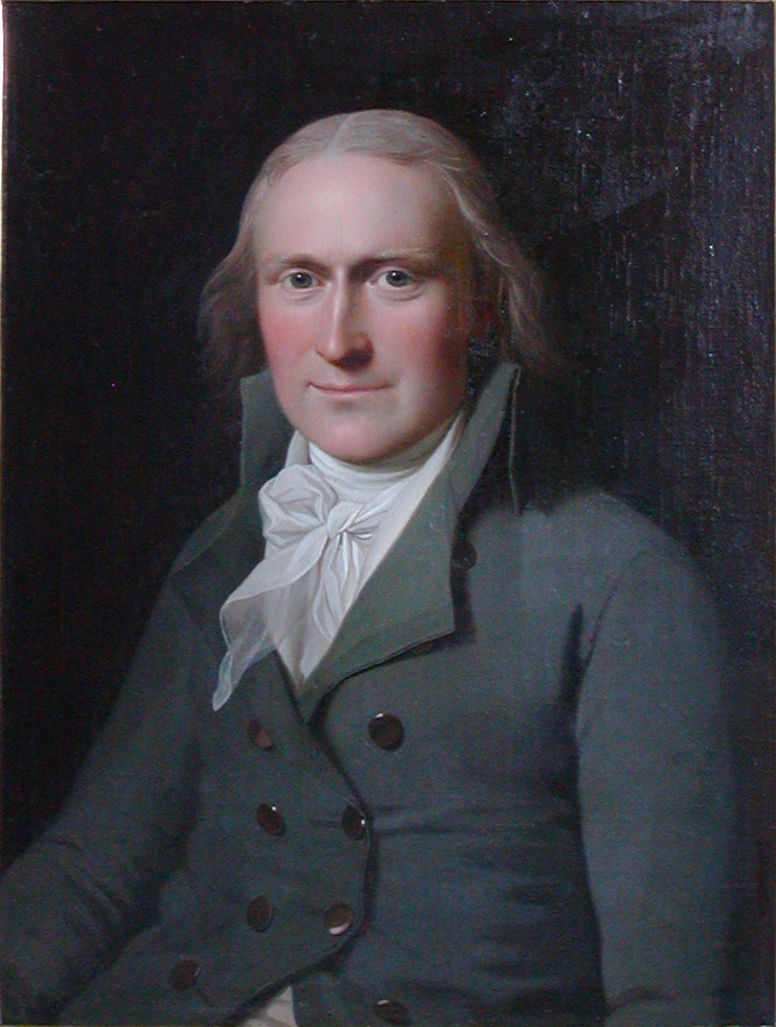
Peter Andreas Heiberg.

=== January–March ===
- 20 January – Jørgen Jørgensen, explorer (born 1780)

=== April–June ===
- 8 June – Johannes Rehling, colonial administrator /died 1775)
- 30 April – Peter Andreas Heiberg, author (born 1758)
- 19 June – Ludvig Mariboe, businessman, publisher and politician (born 1781)

=== July–September ===
- 39 July – Jens Wilken Hornemann, botanist (died 1770)

=== October–December ===
- 17 November – Cladius Detlev Fritzsch, flower painter (born 1765)
- 21 November – Thomas Blom, master mason and architect (born 1777)
