= Gråbrødretorv 13 =

Building in Copenhagen, Denmark

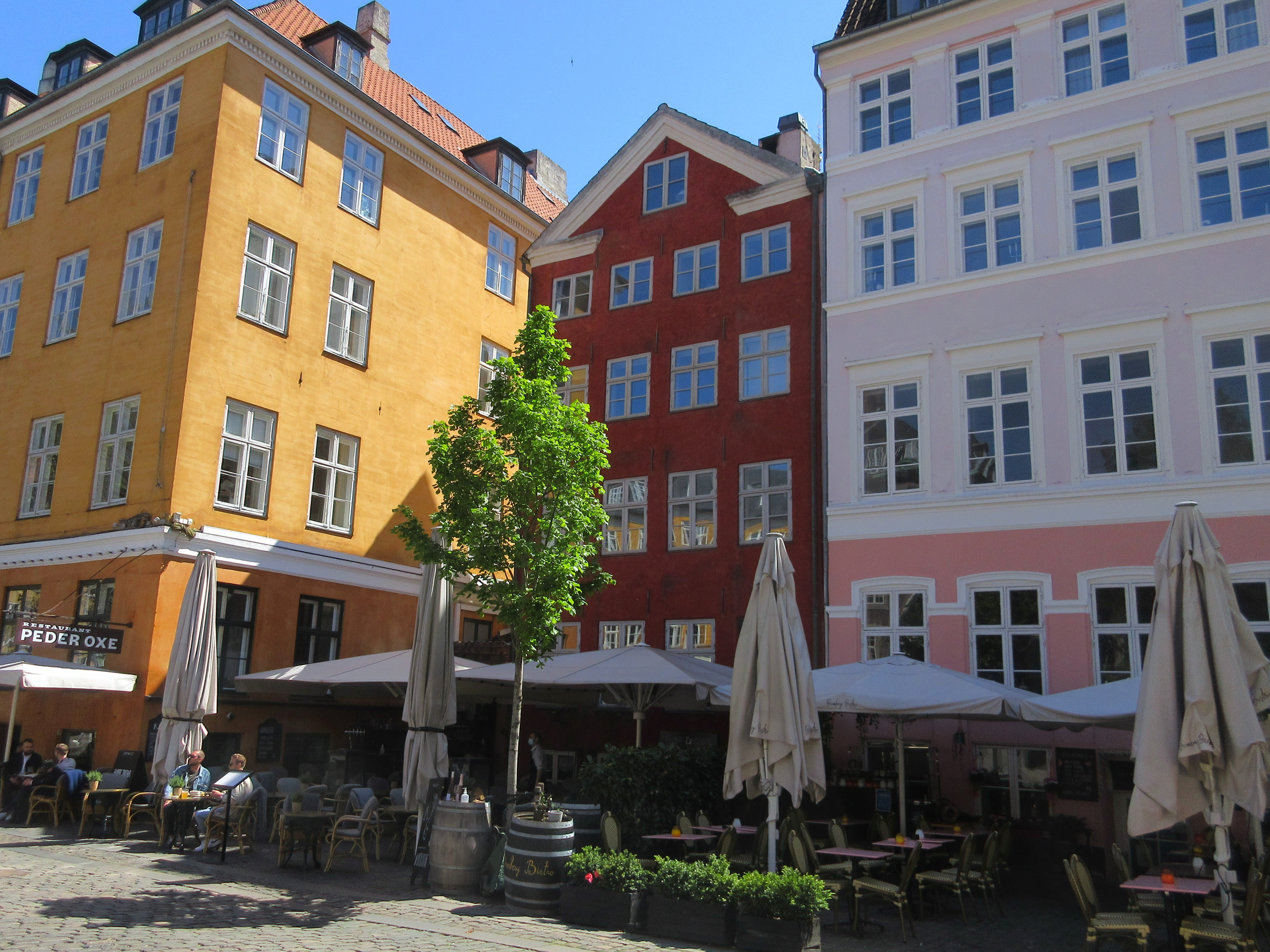
- Interactive map of the Gråbrødretorv 13 area

General information
- Architectural style: Neoclassical Baroque
- Location: Copenhagen, Denmark
- Coordinates: 55°40′46.38″N 12°34′33.38″E
- Completed: 1732
- Renovated: 1784 and 1968-71

Gråbrødretorv 13 is a property situated on the south side of Gråbrødretorv in the Old Town of Copenhagen, Denmark. The building is a typical example of the so-called "fire houses" which were constructed as part of the rebuilding of the city following the Copenhagen Fire of 1728, although the fourth floor was not added until 1784. The building was listed in the Danish registry of protected buildings and places in 1932. Restaurant Bøf & Ost has been based in the building since 1972.

== History ==
=== 16th to 18th centuries ===
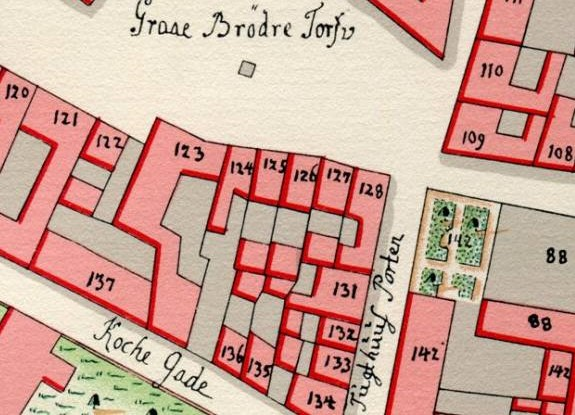
No. 122 seen on a detail from Christian Gedde's map of Frimand's Quarter.

In the middle of the 16th century a house was constructed on the site by either Anders Krogemager or Hanns Viingardt. It was from the end of the century owned by Church of the Holy Ghost and used as a residence for the organist at the church. In 1631 the church sold it to university book printer Johan Philip Bockenhofer at No. 15. Some ten days later he sold the property to skipper Niels Lauritzen Kock. The property was in 1689 as No. 132 in Frimand's Quarter again owned by the Church of the Holy Ghost and used as a residence for the organist at the church.

The building was later acquired by bookbinder Hans Møller. His building was together with the church and most of the other buildings in the area destroyed in the Copenhagen Fire of 1728. The lot was in January 1730 described as empty. Møller died shortly thereafter. In December 1731, his widow sold the still empty lot at auction. The buyer was brewer Bent Bentsen, owner of the property to the east (now No. 11). Half a year later, he sold the property to mason Hans Povelsen but kept a section of it furthest away from the square. Povelsen did not immediately start the construction of a house on the lot but most likely waited until some time during 1æ. In 1742, Povelsen sold his property to shoemaker Rasmus Sørensen Ørtrip 734. The first description of the building dates from March 1735.

The property was upon Rasmus Sørensen Øtrup's death in 1750 sold to shoemaker Hans Brondelsen Schiller. It was from 1756 known as No. 122 in Frimand's Quarter. Schillerkept the property until 1784. The next owner was school master Lorents Lassen.

=== 19th century ===
The building was at the time of the 1801 census home to a total of 27 people distributed on six households. Lorentz Lassen, now registered as a candlemaker, resided in the building with his wife Elsabeth Nissen, their four children and a maid. Heinrich Ludvig Steding, a teacher at Petri School on the other side of the square, resided in the building with his wife Margrethe Sophia Nüscke and a lodger. The lodger Ingwer Paul Mathiesen worked as a volunteer in Rentekammeret. Christian Bugge, a master book binder, resided in the building with his wife Ane Margrethe Schmidt, his employee Carl Gustav Kølle and a maid. Johan Georg Lappe, another master bookbinder, resided in the building with his wife Ane Christine Holst and an employee. The fifth household consisted of master tailor Johannes Hagedorn, his wife Maria Mohnsen and their nine-year-old son Johannes. The last household consisted of the carpenter Engelbrect Halvorsen and his wife Anne Cathrine Berends, the 45-year-old widow Karen Larsen with her two children and a maid.

The property was in the new cadastre of 1806 listed as No. 105. It was by then owned by candlemaker Lorentz Lassen.

The number of residents had by 1840 increased to 49. Most of them were still craftsmen, especially shoemakers and tailors. It was at the time of the 1845 census home to a total of 51 people.

=== 20th century ===
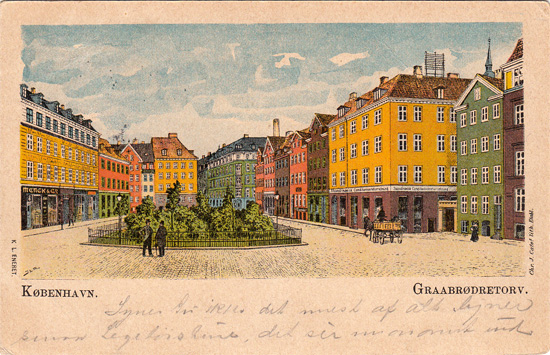
The building seen furthest to the right on a postcard by J. L. Ridter.

The property was home to a total of 25 people at the 1006 census. Hans Chr. Petersen Adelaide Christensia Petersen, an elderly couple, resided on the first floor. Kirstine Larsen, a 77-year-old widow, resided on the second floor with two lodgers. Anders Peter Hansen, a greengrocer, resided in the basement with his wife Anine Petrine Elisabeth Hansen. Karen Sofie Hansen, a seamstress, resided on the second floor with her two children (aged 10 and 12) and a lodger.Maren Sofie Jacobsen, a 43-year-old widow cleaninglady, resided on the fourth floor with her 17-year-old son. Anders Peter Simonsen, a 32-year-old workman (widower), resided on the ground floor of the rear wing with his three children (aged 11 to 17). Caterine Petersen, a 42-year old bookkeeper, resided on the first floor of the rear wing. Jens Peter Clausen and Else Mari Clausen resided on the second floor of the rear wing with their two children (aged 21 and 25). Karen Vilhelmine Søllegaard, a 50-year-old widow, resided on the fourt floor of the rear wing with her 15-year-old son.

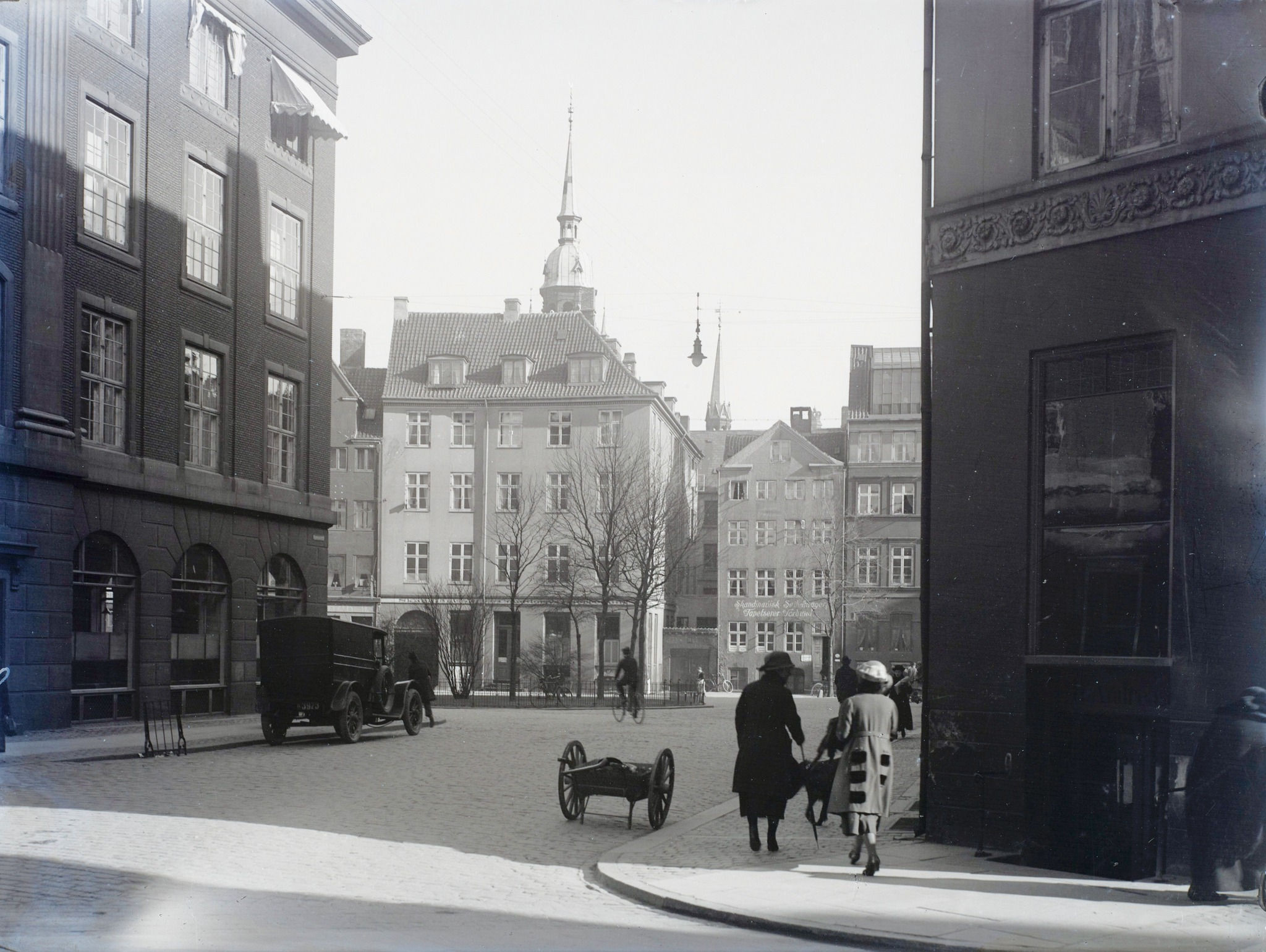
Gråbrødretorv 13 ciewed from Skindergade on a photograph by Peter Elfelt, 1922.

The building was in the late 1960s deemed in danger of collapsing and therefore provided with deep foundation support. Remains from the old Franciscan Friary FROM WHICH THE SQUARE TAKES ITS NAME was in this connection retrieved by the Museum of Copenhagen. The ground floor and basement was at the same time by Peter Tholstrup with the assistance of architect Hans Henrik Olrik adapted for use as a restaurant. Tholstrup opened Restaurant Bøg & Ost in the building in 1972. In 1985, he also opened Restaurant Peder Oxe in the building next door at No. 11.

== Architecture ==
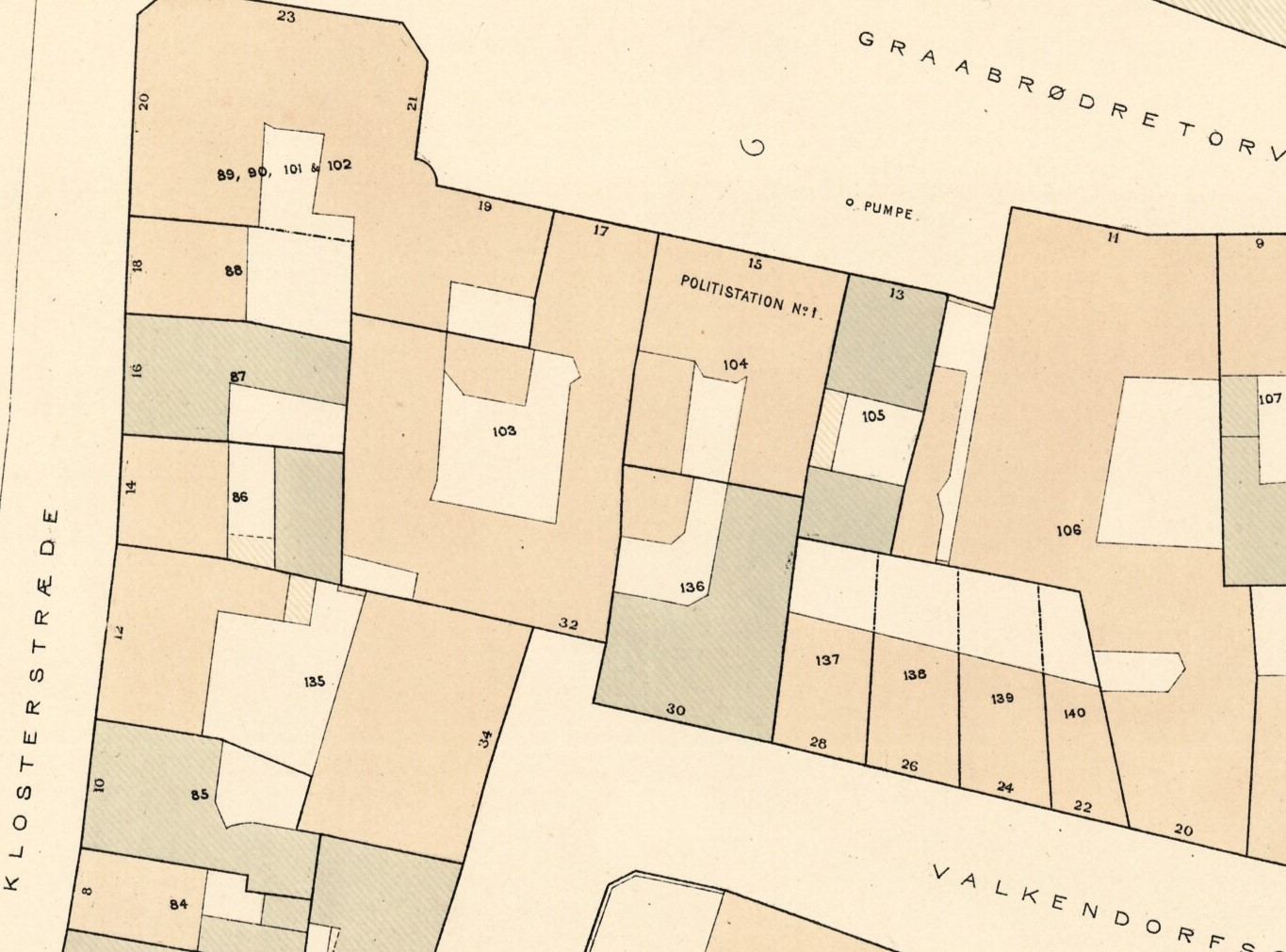
Gråbrødretorv 13 seen on a detail from one of Berggreen's block plans of Frimand's Quarter, 1886–1888.

Gråbrødretorv 13 is a three-winged complex consisting of a foyr-bay main wing towards the square, a perpendicular wing with the building's staircase on the east side of s small courtyard and a rear wing. The main wing is constructed with four storeys over a walk-out basement. The fourth storey was added in 1784. It is crowned by a gable in the full width of the building. The front side is constructed in brick, plastered and red-painted with white-painted windows and a substantial white cornice with cornice returns. The main entrance is located in the bay furthest to the right (west) and the basement entrance is located in the second bay from the right. The facades towards the courtyard is constructed with green-painted timber framing and plastered, white infills. The roof and facades were renovated in 20216.

== Today ==
Gråbrødretorv 13 is still owned by the Tholstrup family via Banana APS af 5.5.55. Restaurant Bøf & Ost is based in the ground floor of the building.
