= Kompagnistræde 24 =

Listed building in Copenhagen

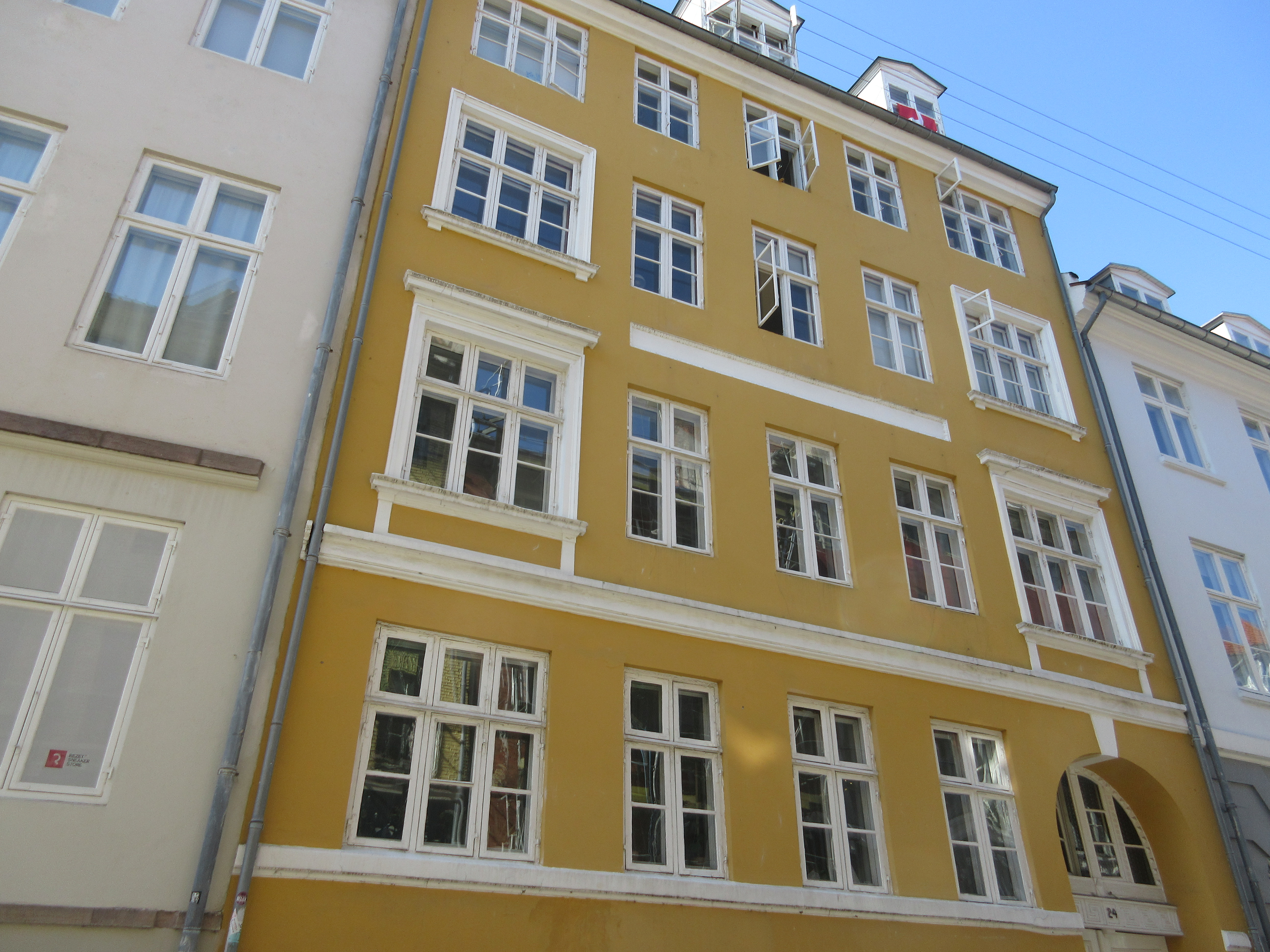
- Interactive map of the Kompagnistræde 24 area

General information
- Location: Copenhagen, Denmark
- Coordinates: 55°40′36.7″N 12°34′28.88″E
- Completed: 1797-98
- Renovated: 1849 (heightened)

Kompagnistræde 24 is a Neoclassical property situated on Strædet, between Knabrostræde and R¨dhusstræde, in the Old Town of Copenhagen, Denmark. It was constructed as part of the rebuilding of the city following the Copenhagen Fire of 1795 and later heightened with one storey in 1849. The building was listed in the Danish registry of protected buildings and places in 1979. Notable former residents include the artist Janus Laurentius Ridter.

== History ==
=== 18th century ===
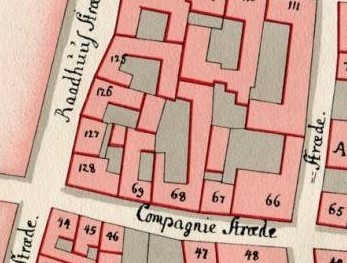
No. 69 seen on a detail from Christian Gedde's map of Snaren's Quarter, 1757

The property was listed as No. 70 in Snaren's Quarter in Copenhagen's first cadastre of 1689. It was at that time owned by brewer Just Christensen. The property was listed as No. 69 in the new cadastre of 1756 and was then owned by distiller Peder Truelsen.

The property was home to 16 residents in six households at the time of the 1787 census. Johannes Pedersen, a distiller and the owner of the property, resided in the building with his wife Ane Magrethe Horn, one distillery worker and one maid. Sara Amsel, a Jewish widow, resided in the building with her 11-year-old relative Petche Jacobsen. Ephraim Mangelus, an 83-year-old widower, was also a resident of the building. Jens Jensen, a workman associated with Civiletatens Materialgård, resided in the building with his wife Abelone Christens Datter. Andreas Hansen, a workman associated with Christiansborg Palace, resided in the building with his wife Bodil Peders Datter and their two children (aged two and eight). Svend Jensen, a cellarman, resided in the building with his wife Johanna Christens Datter and their one-year-old daughter.

The property was destroyed in the Copenhagen Fire of 1795, together with most of the other buildings in the area. The present building on the site was constructed in 1797–98 for carpenter David Pipper.

=== 19th century ===
The property was home to 34 residents in nine households at the 1801 census. Jens Nielsen Holm, a distiller, resided in the building with his wife Marie Margrethe Tørk, one male servant and one maid. Friderich Dublin, a silk dyer, resided in the building with his wife Felicite Rose and one maid. Ulrich Christian Brønlund (1761–1826), a lawyer, resided in the building with his wife Karen Holm, their five children (aged one to 12), a clerk and two maids. Peder Olsen Klokke, a "sand man", resided in the building with his wife Cathrine Lind and their two children (aged five and 10). Elias Petersen From, a master tailor, resided in the building with his wife Maren Friderichsen. Johannes Rosenkilde, a tailor, resided in the building with his wife Karen Kirstine Jungberg, their five-year-old daughter and one lodger (a tailor). Poul Petersen, a tobacco cutter, resided in the building with his wife Anne Hendrichsdatter. Jacob Hansen Moul, a workman, resided in the building with his wife Birthe Sophie Nielsdatter, their two-year-old daughter and a four-year-old boy in their care. The last resident was a 54-year-old widow.

The property was listed as No. 72 in the new cadastre of 1806. It was at that time owned by Stine Beckman.

The property was home to 31 residents at the 1840 census. Frederik Nørskov, a master shoemaker, resided on the ground floor with his wife Ellen Hansen, two shoemakers, one shoemaker's apprentice and one maid. Julius Wilhelm Klein, a carpenter, resided on the first floor with his wife Kristiane Frederikke Andersen. Niels Sørensen Buhl, a master joiner, resided on the second floor with one joiner, three joiner's apprentices, one lodger and one maid. Frederik Wolf, a watchman, was also resident on the first floor with his wife Maren Retsaug. Povl Gude, a workman, resided on the second floor with his wife Karen Hansen and their five children (aged one to 12). Jørgen Gunsen, another workman, resided on the second floor with his wife Maren Hedevig Mortensen, their two-year-old daughter and his brother Peter Gustav Gunsen. Ole Larsen, a bread seller, resided in the basement with his wife Dortea Marie Nielsen and their three children (aged one to six). Jens Petersen, a workman, resided on the ground floor of the rear wing with his wife Johanne Jensen, their three children (aged two to six) and one lodger. Julle Frederikke Verger Bang and Bolette Dam, two women, each of them with two children (aged one to five), were also residents of the building (location not specified in the census records).

The building was heightened with one storey in 1849. The property was home to a total of 38 residents at the time of the 1860 census. The residents included a master tailor, a master shoemaker, a sailmaker, a courier, a watchman and a couple of workmen with their respective families.

The number of residents had increased to 44 at the 1880 census. Most of the residents were still craftsmen, minor traders or workmen. They included a master shoemaker, a master saddler and a book binder with their respective families and lodgers.

The artist Janus Laurentius Ridter was among the residents of the building in the early 1880s.

== Architecture ==
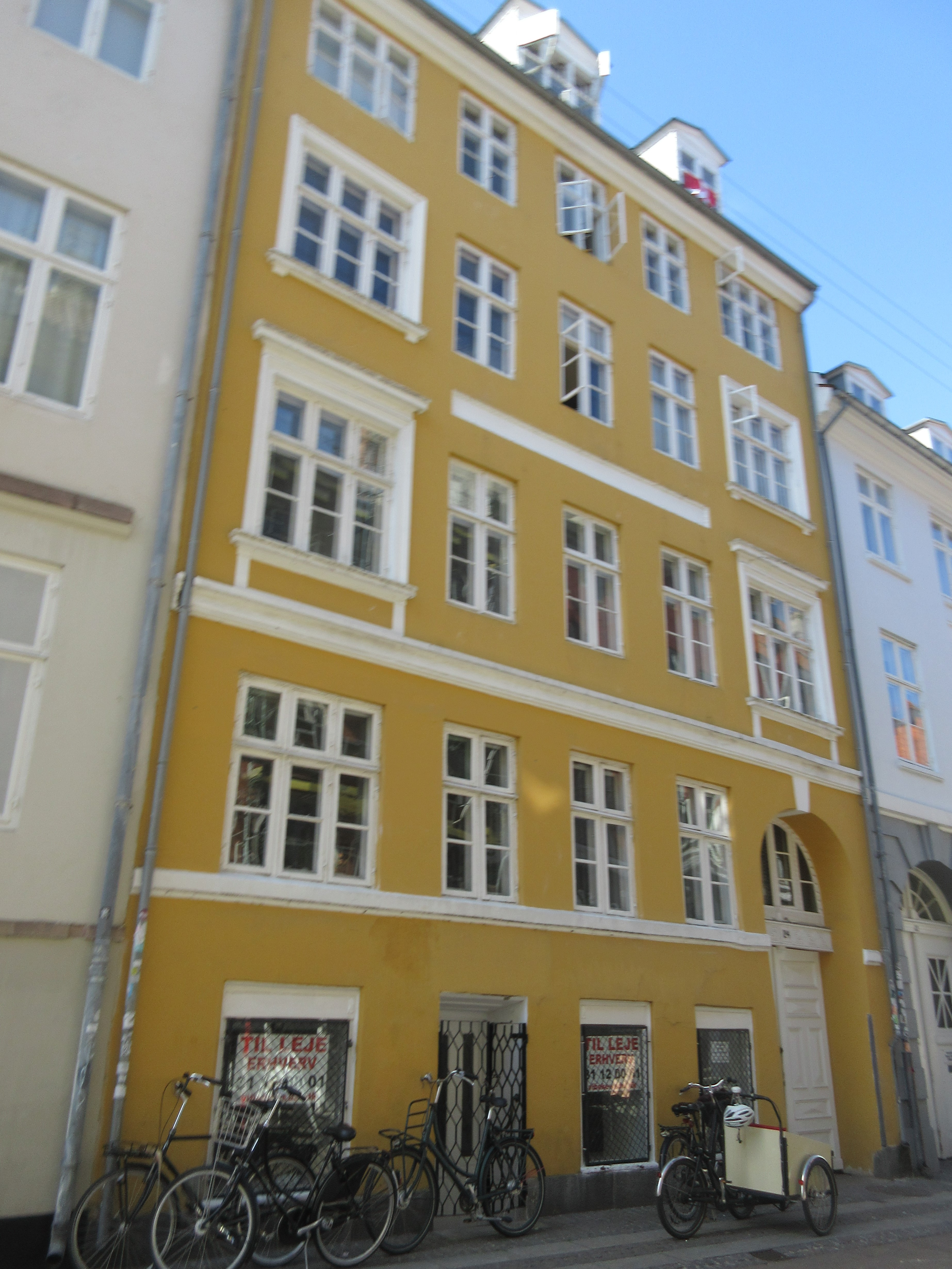
Kompagnistræde 24

Kompagnistræde 24 is constructed with four storeys over a walk-out basement. The facade is five bays wide, of which the two outer ones are wider than the three central ones. The plastered and yellow-painted facade is finished with a sill course below the ground floor windows, a belt course above the ground floor and a cornice below the roof. There is a recessed band with stucco decorations between the three central windows of the first and second floors. The outer windows on the first and second floors are furthermore accented with framing and projecting sills and the second floor windows are in addition to this topped by hood moulds. A gate topped by a decorative lunette and a white-painted keystone is located in the bay furthest to the right. The basement entrance is located in the second bay from the left. The lower part of the mansard roof features three dormer windows; the central one is a little wider than the two others. A red-painted, one-storey toilet building is also heritage listed.

== Today ==
Kompagnistræde 24 is owned by E/F Kompagnistræde 24. It contains a shop in the basement and one condominium on each of the upper floors.

== Gallery ==
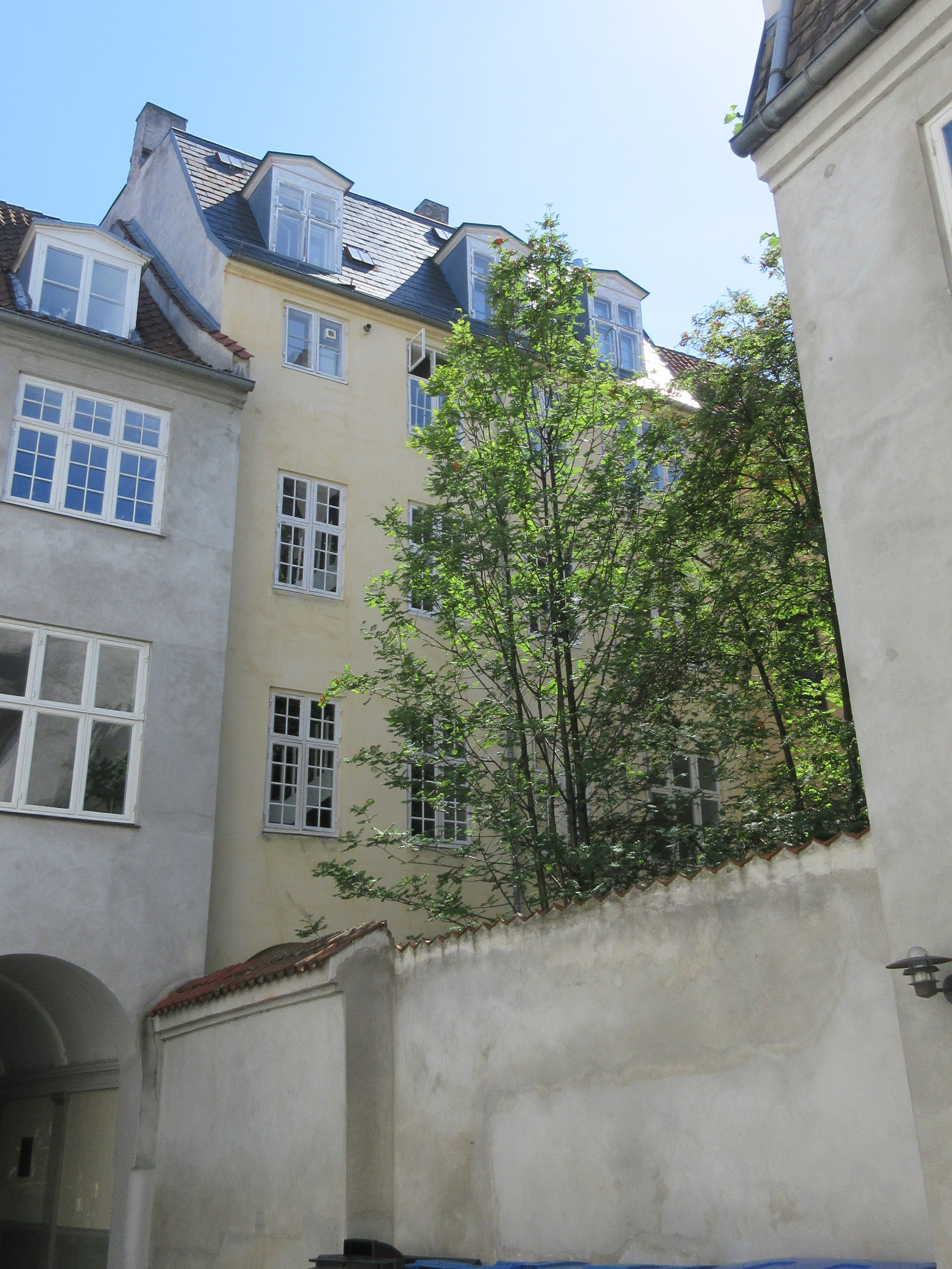
The rear side of the building viewed from the courtyard of No. 22.
