= Gråbrødretorv 11 =

Historic building in Copenhagen

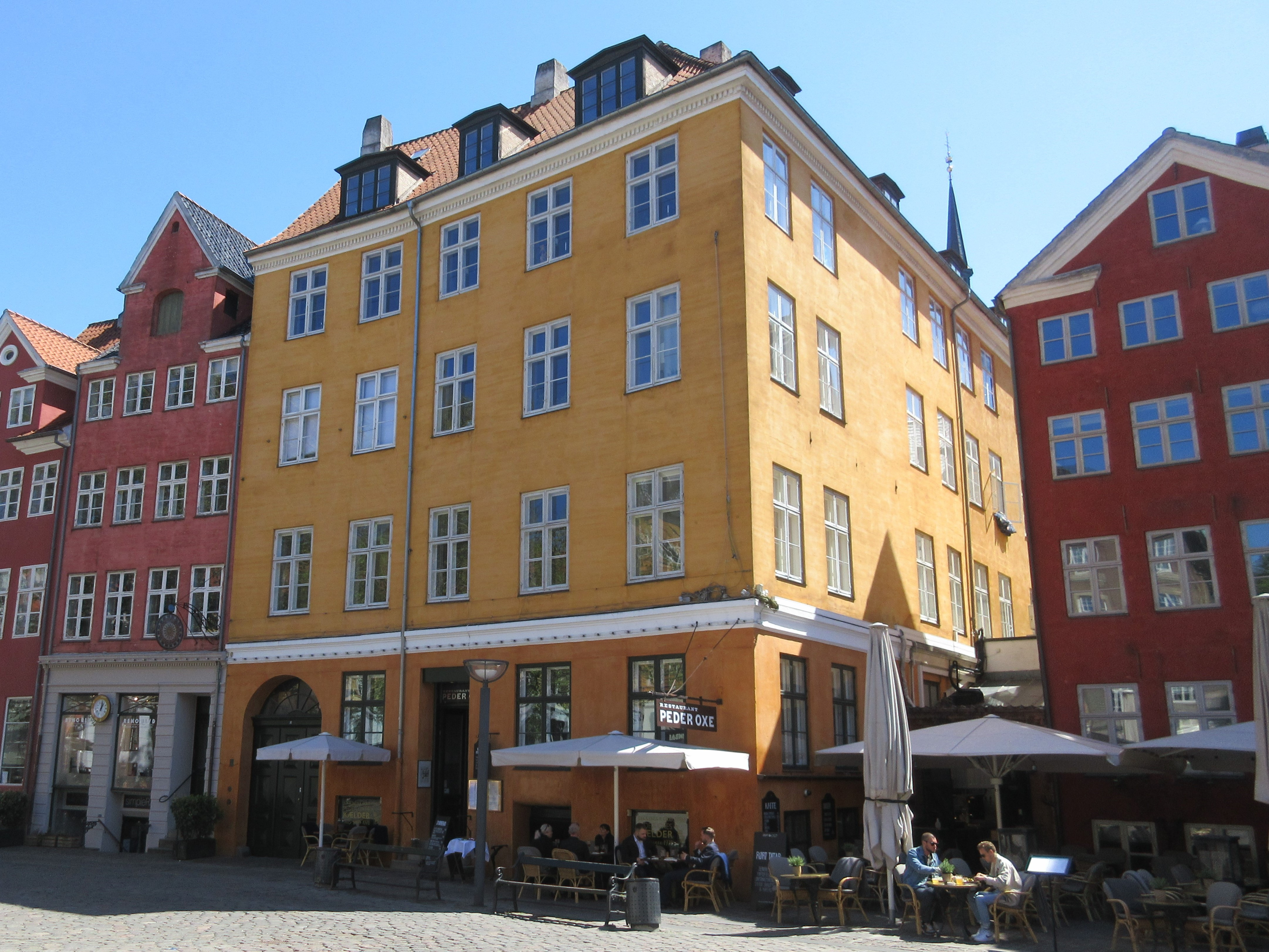
- Interactive map of the Gråbrødretorv 11 area

General information
- Architectural style: Neoclassical Baroque
- Location: Copenhagen, Denmark
- Coordinates: 55°40′46.81″N 12°34′33.78″E
- Completed: 1731, 1844 (Valkendorffsgade 20), 1847 (cross wing)
- Renovated: 1843–44

Gråbrødretorv 11 is a property situated on the south side of Gråbrødretorv in the Old Town of Copenhagen, Denmark. Originally a brewer's house from 1731, it was adapted and heightened by one storey in the first half of the 1840s. It was around the same time expanded with a four-storey residential building at Valkendorfsgade 20 on the other side of the block. The entire complex was listed in the Danish registry of protected buildings and places in 1932.

== History ==
=== Before the Fire of 1728 ===
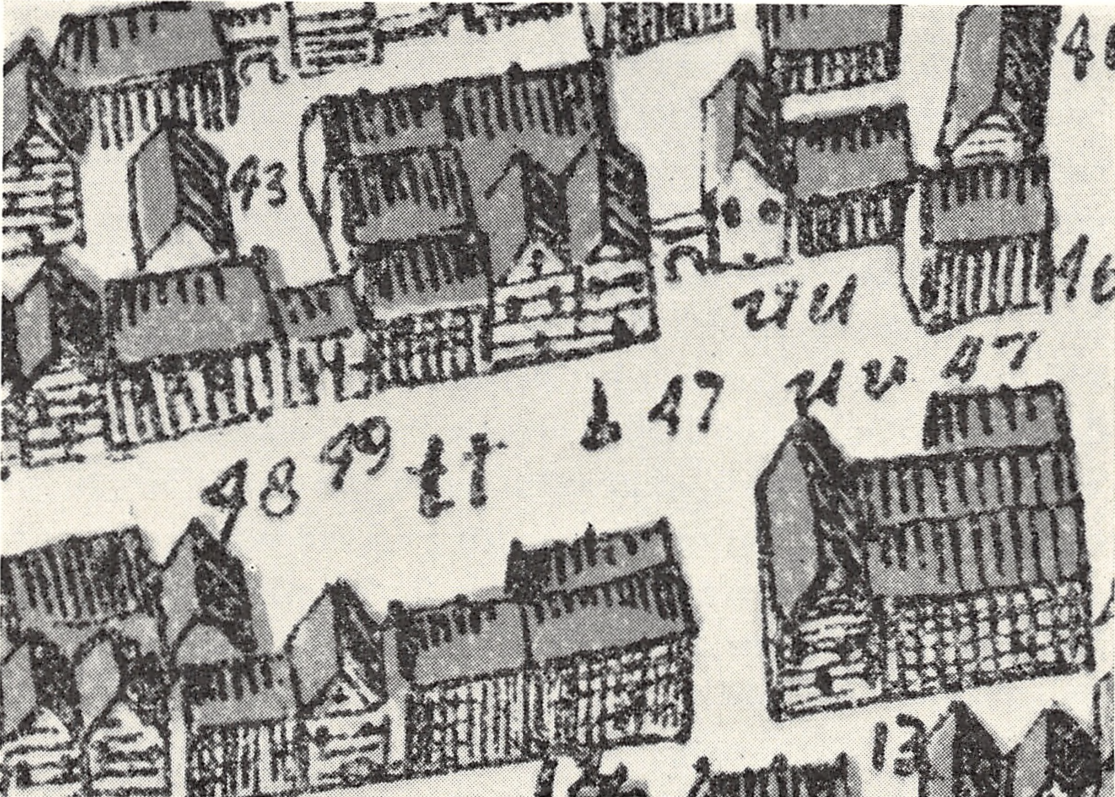
Detail from Rosen's elevated 1764 map of Copenhagen: The alley between Gråbrødretorv 11 and Gråbrødretorv 13 is closed by a boom.

The site was originally made up of two smaller properties, one towards the square and one towards Valkendorfsgade on the other side of the block. The property facing the square was listed in Copenhagen's first cadastre of 1689 as No. 133 in Frimand's Quarter owned by Master Anders Guntzow, The property in Valkendorfsgade, with four tenancies, was owned by Master Andre's hairs.

A no longer existing, narrow alley separated the buildings from the ones to the west (now Gråbrødretorv 13), providing a durexct link between the square and the street. This alley can be seen on Resen's 1674 map of Copenhagen.

=== 1829–1789 ===
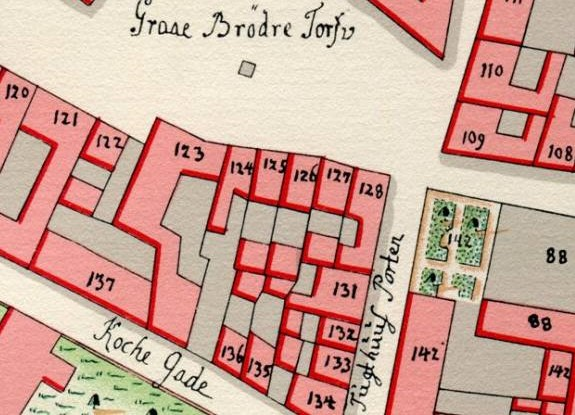
No. 125 seen on a detail from Christian Gedde's map of Frimand's Quarter, 1757.

Both properties were together with most of the other buildings in the area destroyed in the Copenhagen Fire of 1728 and subsequently merged into a single property. The present building on Gråbrødretorv was constructed for brewer Bent Bentsen in 1731. In 1756, it was as No. 123 owned by kommerceråd Johan Jørgen Holst. The property was later sold to kancelliråd Peler Christian Kinckel (1730-1800).

=== Hans and Johanne Marie Swane, 1789-1808 ===
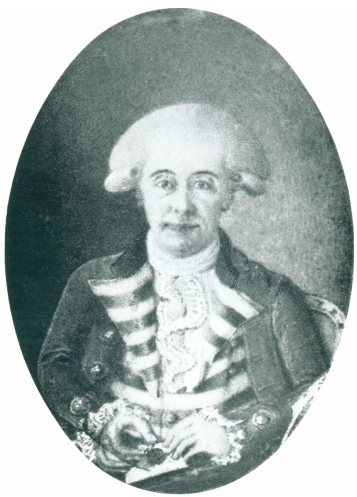
Hans Swane

In 1789, Kinckel sold the property to Hans Svane for 21,000 rifsdaler. Hans Swane (1753-1803) was the son of sea captain Lars Swane and Johanne Marie Harboe. His parents had owned the property at Gammel Strand 42 (then No. 12) from 1764. His late father had between 1757 and 1771 captained six expeditions to Canton and Tranquebar for the Danish Asiatic Company. Hans Swane had himself spent five years in Canton from 1773 to 1778. He later visited China three more times with ships of the Danish Asiatic Company, last time as acting supercargo in 1788. On 10 March 1788, he had married Johanne Marie Gad, prompting his wish to substitute his turbulent life at sea with a more secure life as a brewer in Copenhagen.

The property was then a three-storey building with two gables facing the square. Swane resided with his family in the ground-floor apartment. The more stately apartments on the two upper floors were let out. The brewery was situated in a perpendicular side wing. Its facade featured a wall dormer with a pulley. The capacity of the copper boiler in the ground floor was 14 barrels of malt. The basement was used for the yeasting and cooling processes. The upper floors were used for the storage of malt and grain. The rear wing (Tværnygningen) contained a passageway in the ground floor and residential quarters for servants and staff on the upper floors. The three storey building on Kokkegade (now Valkendorffsgade) contained a gateway and stabling for four horses in the ground floor. The upper floors were used as storage space for animal feed, firewood and grain. The building featured a wall dormer with a pulley towards the yard.

In October 1794, Swane was also licensed as a timber merchant. He leased one of the 16 lumberyards near Kalvebod Beach.

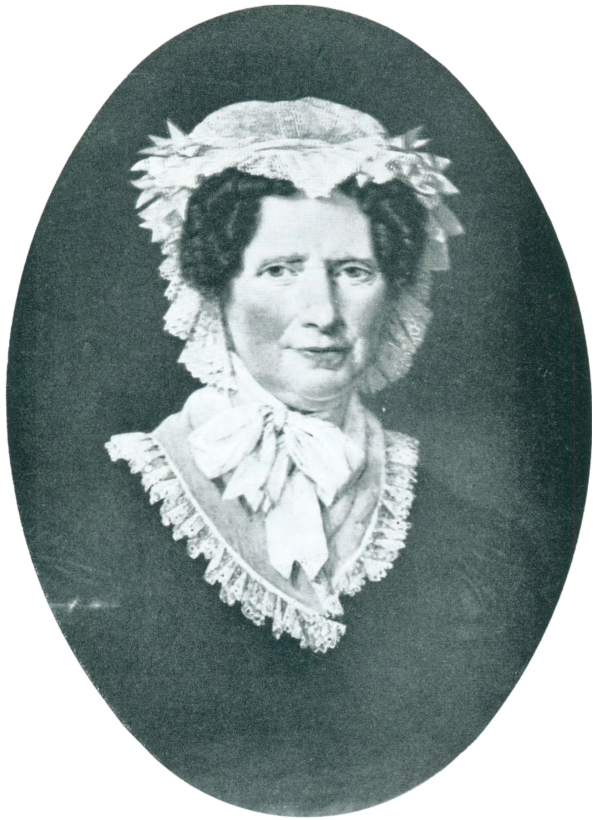
Johanne Marie Swane, née Gad.

The property was home to two households at the 1801 census. Hans and Johanne Marie Swane resided in the building with their children Lars Swane; Johanne Marie Elisabeth Swane; Jørgen Swane; Birgithe Francisca Swane and Hans Marius Swane. Swane's sister Birgitte was married to pastor Søren Sørensen Ingemann at Thorkildstrup Rectory on Lolland. At the time of the 1801 census, their son Lars Ingemann (1778-) was also living with his uncle in the home on Gråbrødretorv while he was studying in Copenhagen. A younger son was the later priest and writer Bernhard Severin Ingemann. He was in the early part of his life a close friend of Lars Svane and often visited the family on Gråbrødretorv. A brewer, a brewery boy, a caretaker, two maids and three lodgers were also living there with them. The three lodgers were senior clerk (fuldmægtig) in Rentekammeret Jørgen Schmidt, student Peder Steer and Fähnrich in the Norwegian Life Regiment Frederik von Munck. The property was at this point also home to one other household, consisting of ship's masterAndreas Falck, his wife Margrethe née Bastian and their daughter Maren Falck.

Hans Swane died unexpectedly in 1803. Johanne Marie Swane retained undivided possession of the estate. The property was in the new cadastre of 1806 listed as No. 106. In August 1806, Johanne Marie Swane rented out the brewery. In 1806, she sold the property for 16,000 kurantdaler with 8,000 rigsdaler paid up front. In 1810, she purchased the property at Larsbjørnstræde No. 169 (now Larsbjørnstræde 5) for 30,200 rigsdaler. In 1811, she sold it again for 45,000 rigsdaler.

=== 19th century ===
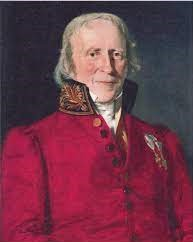
David Monrad

The property was at the time of the 1840 census home to a total of 28 people. The distiller Wilhelm Bendtsen resided on the ground floor with his wife Johanne Lundsteen, six employees and the 54-year-old businessman (grosserer) Andreas Collstrup. The first floor was occupied by the restaurateur Moses Levin and his wife Hanne née Amuel, their two children, two maids, the cigar-maker Abraham Jacobi, weaver Berreg Binel and basket maker Max Koldseh. Jacob Levy, a master tailor (tøjmagermester), resided with his wife Clarine Gabriel, their five children and three employees on the second floor. The building on Gråbrødretorv was adapted and heightened with one storey in 1843–44. The building was at the time of the 1845 census home to a total of 40 people. David Monrad, who had served as Post Master General from 1835 to 1842, resided with his wife, their divorced daughter and grandson, the lady's companion Ida Dorthea Luise Petrea Uldahl and a maid in the apartment on the first floor. Sørine Thaarup, a 45-year-old woman, was operating a boarding home on the third floor. Her 13 lodgers were mostly university students from the provinces. Marinus Severin Aabel, a grocer (urtekræmmer), resided with his wife, two sons and a maid in the basement.

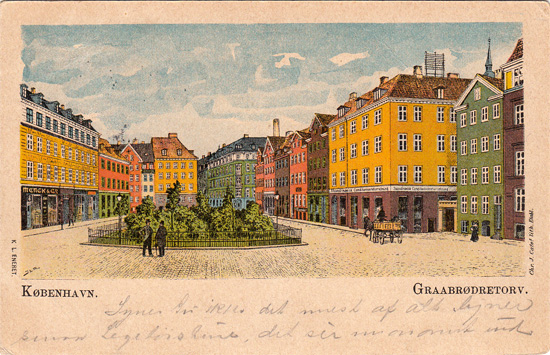
The building seen furthest to the right on a postcard by J. L. Ridter.

The current building at Valkendorfsgade 20 (then Kokkegade No. 106) was constructed for junk dealer Christen Olsen Høedt in 1844. The building was at the time of the 1845 census home to 27 people. Christian Olsen Høedt, the owner of the building, resided with his wife Marie Høedt, their two children and two maids on the first floor. Their son Frederik Høedt (1820-1883) would later become a prominent actor and stage director. Johan Peter Holmer (1798-1871). a high-ranking civil servant at City Hall who would later serve as mayor of the city's 2nd Department from 1858 to 186, resided with his wife, two children and a maid on the second floor. The son Valdemar Holmer (1833-1884) would later become a prominent surgeon at Frederiks Hospital. Frantz Christopher von Jessen, a postmaster, resided with his wife, six children and two maids on the third floor. Jacobine Landholm, a restaurateur, resided with her two children and a maid on the ground floor.

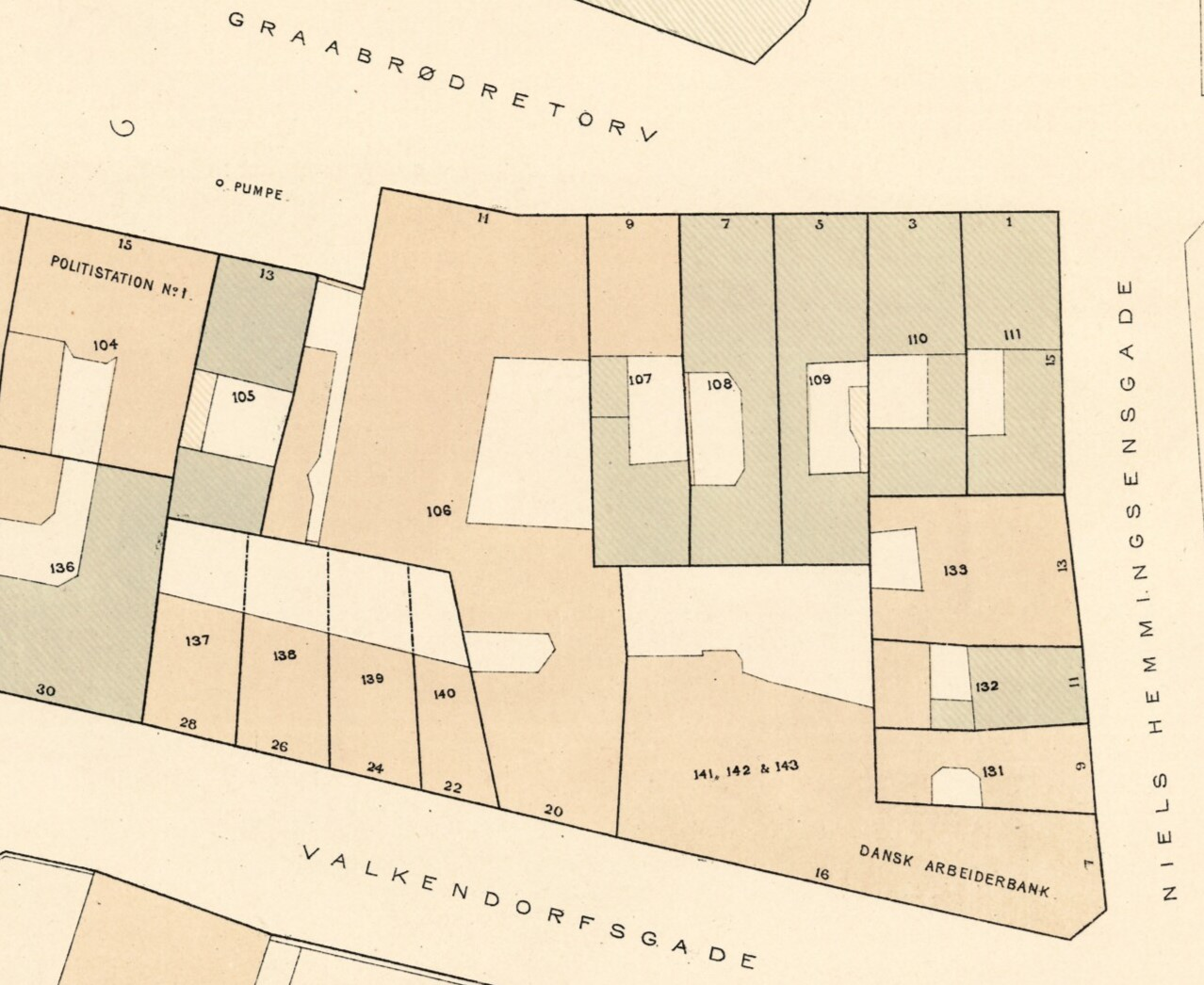
Gråbrødretorv 11 seen on a detail from one of Berggreen's block plans of Frimand's Quarter, 1886-1888.

The cook book writer Anne Marie Mangor (née Bang; 1781–1865) was among the residents in 1856. The later artists Frants Henningsen (1850-1908) and Erik Henningsen (1855-1930) resided in the building with their parents from 1865. The publishing house Th. Lind was based at Gråbrødretorv 11 in the years around 1880.

=== 20th century ===
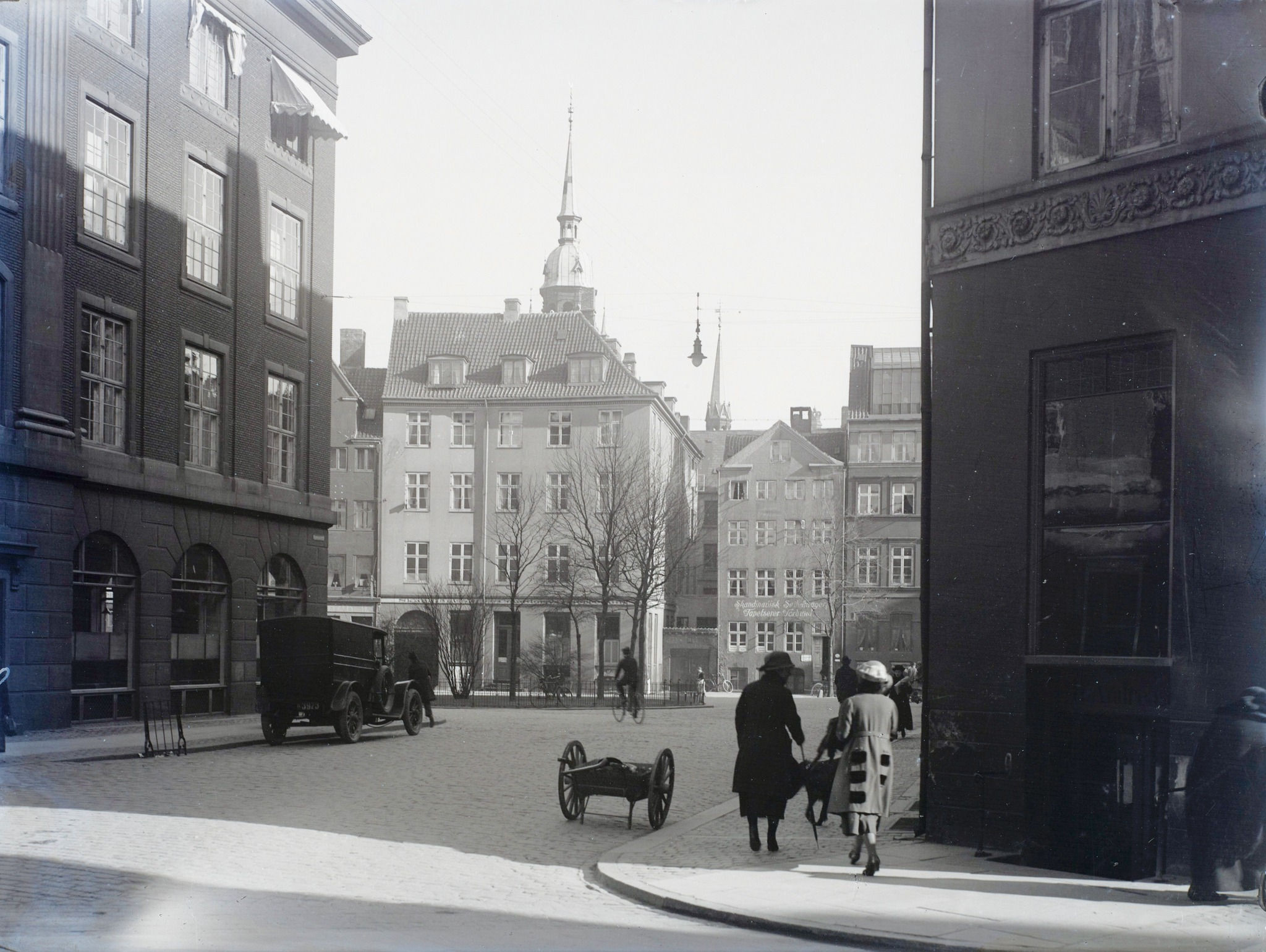
Gråbrødretorv 11 ciewed from Skindergade on a photograph by Peter Elfelt, 1922.

The property was at the time of the 1906 census home to a total of 28 people. Hans Christian Jørgensen, a courier, resided on the first floor with his wife Anna Dorthea Johanne Jørgensen and their and their 19-year-old daughter Anna Dorthea Johanne Jørgensen. Vilhelm August Salomonsen, a founding partner of M & V Salomonsen, resided on the second floor with the Rosalie Julie Salomonsen, their 22-year-old daughter Julie Salomonsen and one maid. Lars Peter Larsen, proprietor of the tobacco shop N. P. Larsen on Amagertorv, resided on the third floor with his wife Johanne Larsen resided, their 12-year-old son Wilhelm Øckenholt Larsen, two maids and one lodger. The lodger was assistant librarian at the Royal Danish Library Alfred Christian Larsen. Elthon Chr. Wenning, a mailman, resided on the fourth floor with wife his Caroline Frederikke Wenning and their six children (aged two to 22). Axel Vilhelm Otto Smidt, a 29-year-old engineer, was also residing on the fourth floor. Poul Gabriel Smidt, a trainee in a law firm, was also residing on the fourth floor. Andreas Madsen, the proprietor of a creamery, resided in the basement with his Oline Sofhie Madsen and their two daughters (aged 11 and 18).

The restaurateur Thomas Tholstrup purchased the building in the early 1970s. It was subsequently subject to a comprehensive renovation. Tholstrup opened Peder Oxe in the basement in 1976. He had already opened Restaurant Bøg & Ost in another building on the square in 1972. The two restaurants were some of the most fashionable restaurants in the city in the 1980s. They both closed in 2023.

== Architecture ==
=== Gråbrødretorv 11 ===
Gråbrødretorv 11 is a three-winged complex constructed with four storeys over a walk-out basement. The facade is rendered in an iron vitriol yellow colour, contrasted by the green-painted windows, doors and gate. The facade is finished with a wide belt course above the ground floor and a dentillated cornice. The front is five bays wide of which the two outer bays are wider than the three central ones. The main entrance to the restaurant in the ground floor is located in the central bay. It is raised three steps from street level and topped by a transom window. The gate in the bay furthest to the left (east) is topped by a fanlight. Part of the perpendicular west wing is visible from Gråbrødretorv due to the shape of the square. The pitched roof is clad with red tile and features a total of seven dormer window. towards the square. It is pierced by a total of five chimneys.

=== Valkendorffsgade 20 ===
Valkendorffsgade 20 is constructed with four storeys over a walk-outbasement and is four bays wide. A short perpendicular wing on its rear attaches it to the rear wing of Gråbrødretorv 11. The ground floor is plastered and painted in a pale grey colour. The upper part of the facade has undressed brick with extruded joints (in Denmark known as "Hamburg joints"). The inset main entrance is raised three steps from the street level and is topped by a transom window. The basement entrance is located in the second bay from the left. The outer windows on the first floor are accented by sandstone framing and the ones on the second floor by projecting sills. The facade is finished with a modillioned cornice. The roof is clad with black tile. It features two dormer windows towards the street.

== Today ==
The property contains 17 condominiums and six rental spaces. It is owned by E/F Matr.nr. 106 Frimands Kvarter. Restaurant Peder Oxe is located in the ground floor of Gråbrødretorv 11.

== Gallery ==
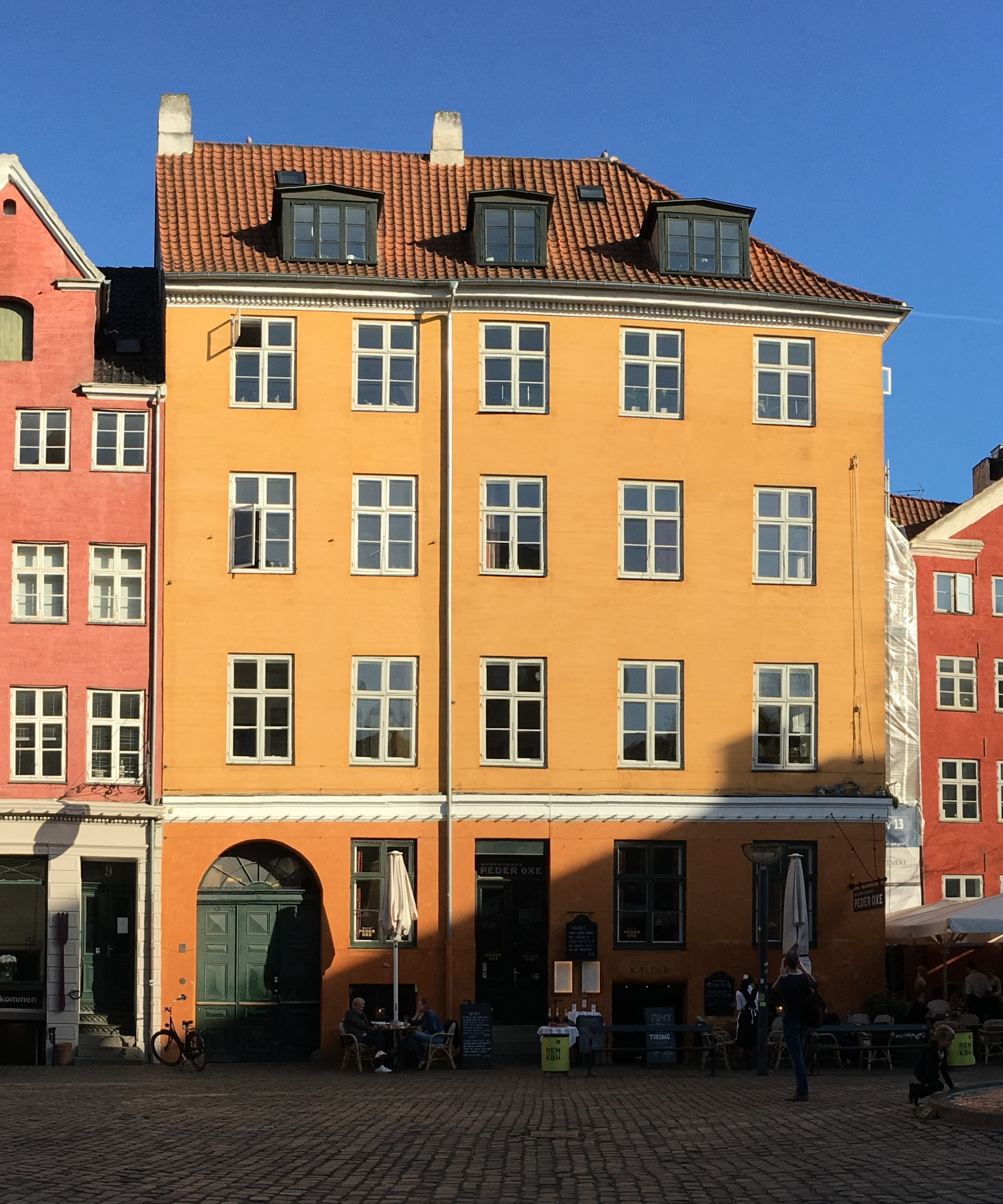
Gråbrødretorv 11

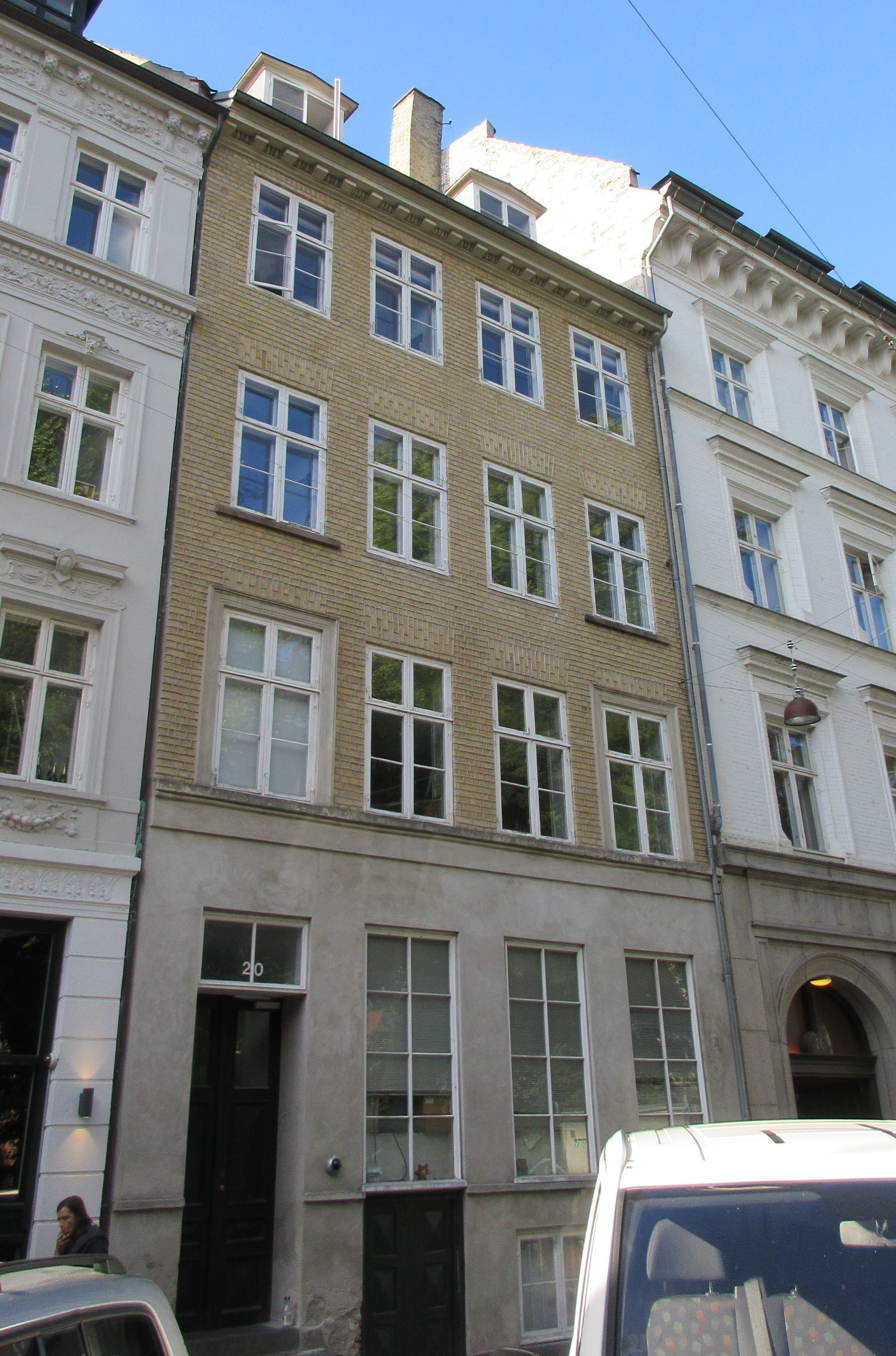
Valkendorffsgade 20
