= Sparekassen for Helsingør og Omegn =

Danish savings bank

- Type: Savings bank
- Industry: Financial services
- Founded: October 1, 1829
- Defunct: 1972
- Fate: Merged
- Successor: Sparekassen København-Sjælland
- Headquarters: Helsingør, Denmark
- Key people: Otto Eehling (Manager)
- Products: Savings accounts, mortgages

Sparekassen for Helsingør og Omegn was a Danish savings bank in Helsingør, Denmark.

== History ==
Helsingør Savings Bank was established on 1 October 1829. Otto Eehling (1812-1892) served as manager of the bank from 1852 until his death. He was the son of the former governor of Tranquebar Johannes Rehling.

In April 1972, it merged with Sparekassen København-Sjælland.
