= Stenders Kunstforlag =

Danish publisher

Stenders Kunstforlag was a leading publisher of postcards and reproductions of artworks based in Copenhagen, Denmark.

== History ==
Carl Stender (1862–1902) was born into a Danish-speaking family in Schleswig. His father Friedrich Ludwig Stender was the managing director of the local psychiatric hospital. In the middle of the 1880s, Stender moved to Copenhagen. Stenders Kunstforlag was founded by him in 1889. The company was initially based in rented premises in Tegne- og Kunstindustriskolen for Kvinder's building at G. C. Andersens Boulevard 10 (then Halmtorvet 10). In around 1890 Stender moved the company to larger premises in Berling's building at Pilestræde9 26. The company had now also moved into the market for reproductions of Nordic artworks. Stender's younger brother Villy (1877–1946) became a partner in 1808. In 1899, Stenders Kunstforlag was converted into a limited company (aktieselskab). In the same year, it relocated to larger premises at Frederiksholms Kanal. Kunstforeningen was also based in the building.

After Carl Stender's death in 1902, Stenders Kunstforlag was continued with his brother-in-law Wilhelm Knudsen (brother of his wife Olga) as managing director. He had for several years worked for the company as a travelling salesman. After his death just four years later, he was replaced by Villy Stender and Poul Mik. Meyer. In the same year, Stenders Kunstforlag relocated to new premises in the Ferrum Building at Rådhuspladsen 35. The building had replaced five older properties in 1904. It was built to designs by Philip Smidth. A subsidiary was shortly thereafter established in Stockholm. It was headed by Martin Bjorkmann.

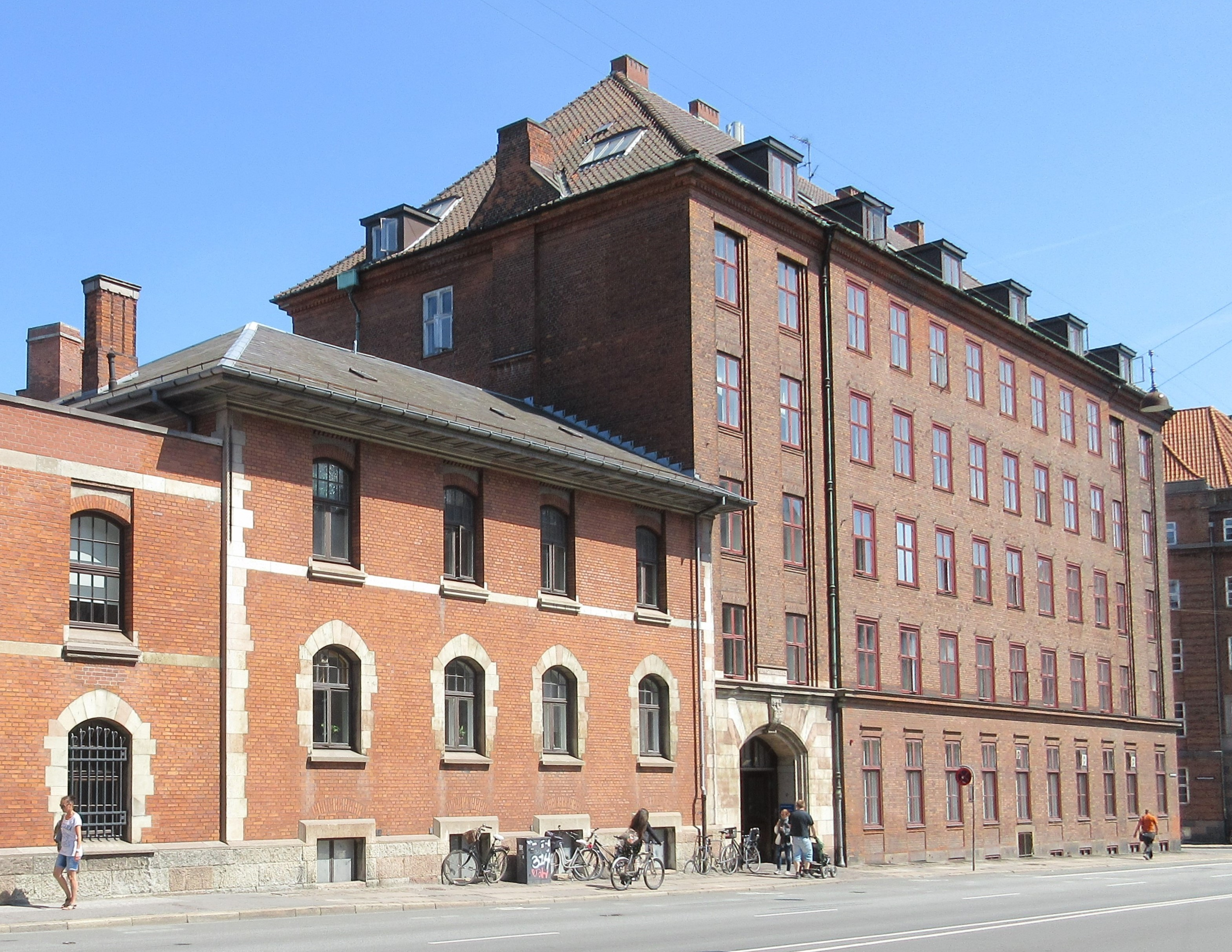
Stender's former building at Bernstorffsgade 12. The low building to the left is part of Copenhagen's Western Power Station.

In 1911, Rådhuspladsen 35 was acquired by the newspaper Politiken. In 1916, Stænders Kunstforlag bought P. Ipsens Enke. In 1916–17, it constructed a large new building at Bernstorffsgade 23 as a new home for the two companies. The building was designed by Med Albert Oppenheim.

In the 1920s and early 1930s, Stenders Kunstforlag was hit by the economic crisis. When Poul Mik. Meyer died in 1930, he was succeeded by Villy Stender's eldest son Curt as head of the daily operations. He invested heavily in new printing machinery. By 1934 the crisis years were replaced by a period with new growth. Villy Stender died in 1946 and Curt died just 47 years old in 1052. The company was then continued by the latter's widow Gertrud with the two long-employees Kaj Ditlevsen and as managing directors. Curt and Gertrud Stender's son Rolf joined the firm in 1955. In 1960, he took om the position of managing director of the company.

In 1963, Stenders Kunstforlag relocated to a new building at Meterbuen 9–13 in Skovlunde. The new building was designed by Jørgen Maahr.

== See also ==
- Alex. Vincents Kunstforlag
