= Alex. Vincents Kunstforlag =

Danish prints and postcards publisher

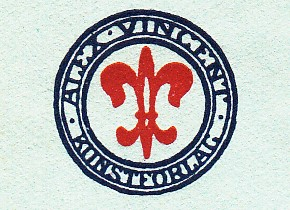
- Industry: Publishing
- Founded: 1890
- Founder: Alexander Vincent
- Defunct: 1950s
- Products: Prints, postcards

Alex Vincents Kunstforlag, founded by Alexander Vincent in 1890, was a leading publisher of prints and postcards based in Copenhagen, Denmark. The company was after the founder's death in 1916 continued first by his wife (1916–1940) and then by their son Alexander Vincent Jr. It was the second largest company of its kind in Denmark, only surpassed by Stenders Kunstforlag.

== History ==
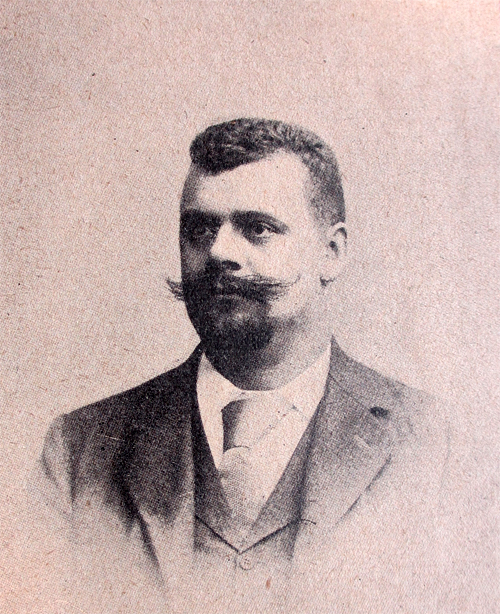
Alex Vincent

Alexander Josva Schmidt Vincent was born out of wedlock on 8 June 1861 in Copenhagen. His parents were restaurateur Alexander Prosper Vincent and Josephine Cathrine Schmidt. His father and widowed grandmother Eva Severine Vincent (née Rasmussen, 1810–1888), who had become a widow in 1849, were the proprietors of the high-end French Restaurant Vincent in the Harsdorff House on Kongens Nytorv.

Vincent lived with his mother but she died when he was just two years old and He was subsequently brought up by the mother's sister, Jutta Frederikke Schmidt. He was still living with her at the time of the 1880 census. They lived in an apartment at Amaliegade 21. He was by then employed as a clerk by the city.

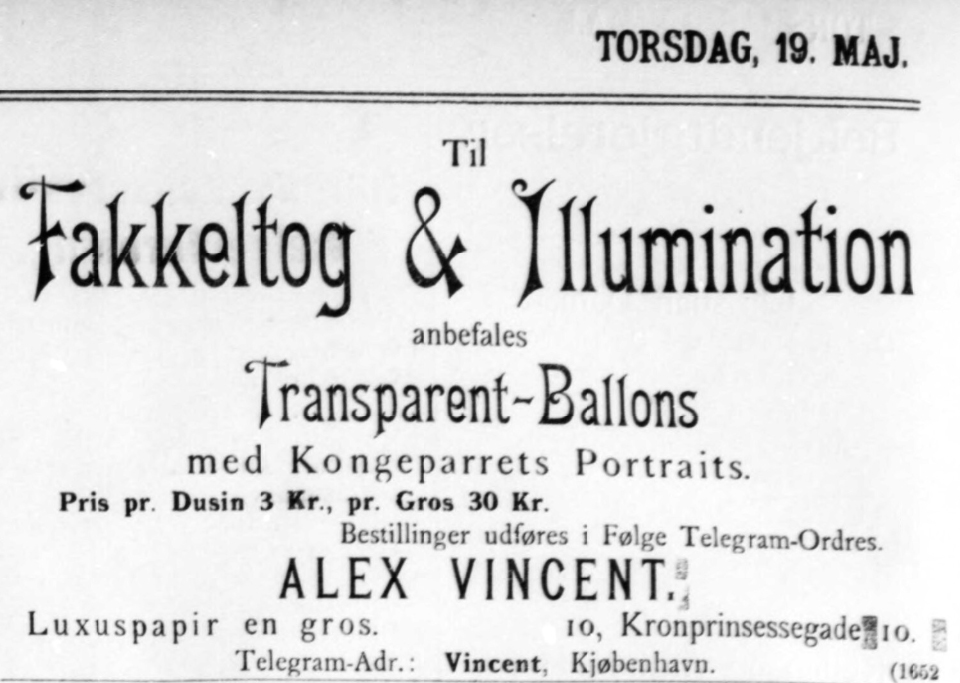
Advert for Alex. Vincent, 1892.

In 1889, Vincent married Agnes Juliette Lodbjerg (1864-1943). Her late father had back in 1845 established a business dealing in mirrors, cards and pictures. Her mother Thora Lodberg had after the father's death continued the firm as H. A. Lodbergs Enke. Vincent was most likely inspired by this shop to start his own business. On 23 October 1890, he started a wholesale stationery business. The first prints published by the firm were large prints for framing and hanging on thewall. A series of Christmas and new year cards based on drawings by the illustrator Axel Thiess was launched for the 1893 season. The firm was initially based on the second floor at Kronprinsessegade 10. Vincent continued H. A. Lodbergs Enke after his mother-in-law's death in 1897. He had the same year bought the property at Kronprinsessegade 12. H. A. Lodbergs Enke was from then on based in the ground floor of the new building while Alex. Vincents Kunstforlag was based on the first floor. Vincent and his wife lived in the apartment on the second floor at No. 10.

The firm's first topographical postcards with motifs from around the country were produced in the 1890s. In 1919, it started the production of a wide range of four-coloured postcards with Danish artworks.

In 1916, Vincent fell ill and died half a year later. The company was subsequently continued by Agnes Vincent. Alex Cincent Jr. succeeded his mother as managing director of the company in connection with its 50th anniversary in 1940. The company was converted into an aktieselskab in 1947. In 1950, it relocated to Store Kongensgade 81. It closed a few years later.

== Gallery ==
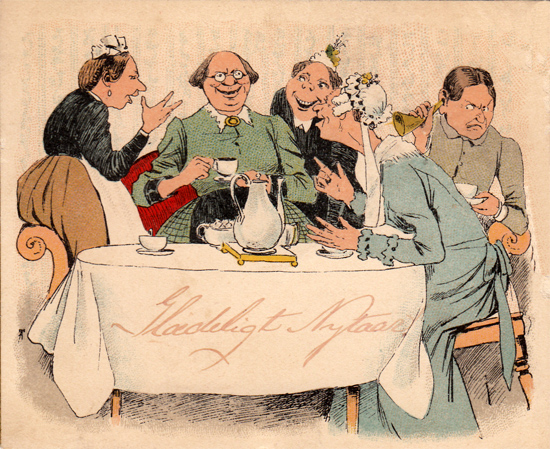
Axel Thiess: Women gosipping by the Coffe Table, 1893.

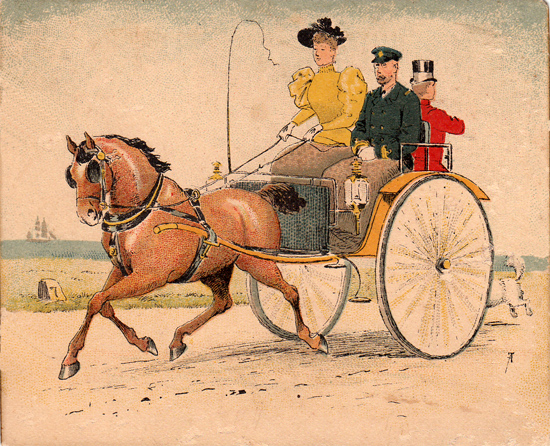
Axel Thiess_ Princess Marie as Coashman, 1893.

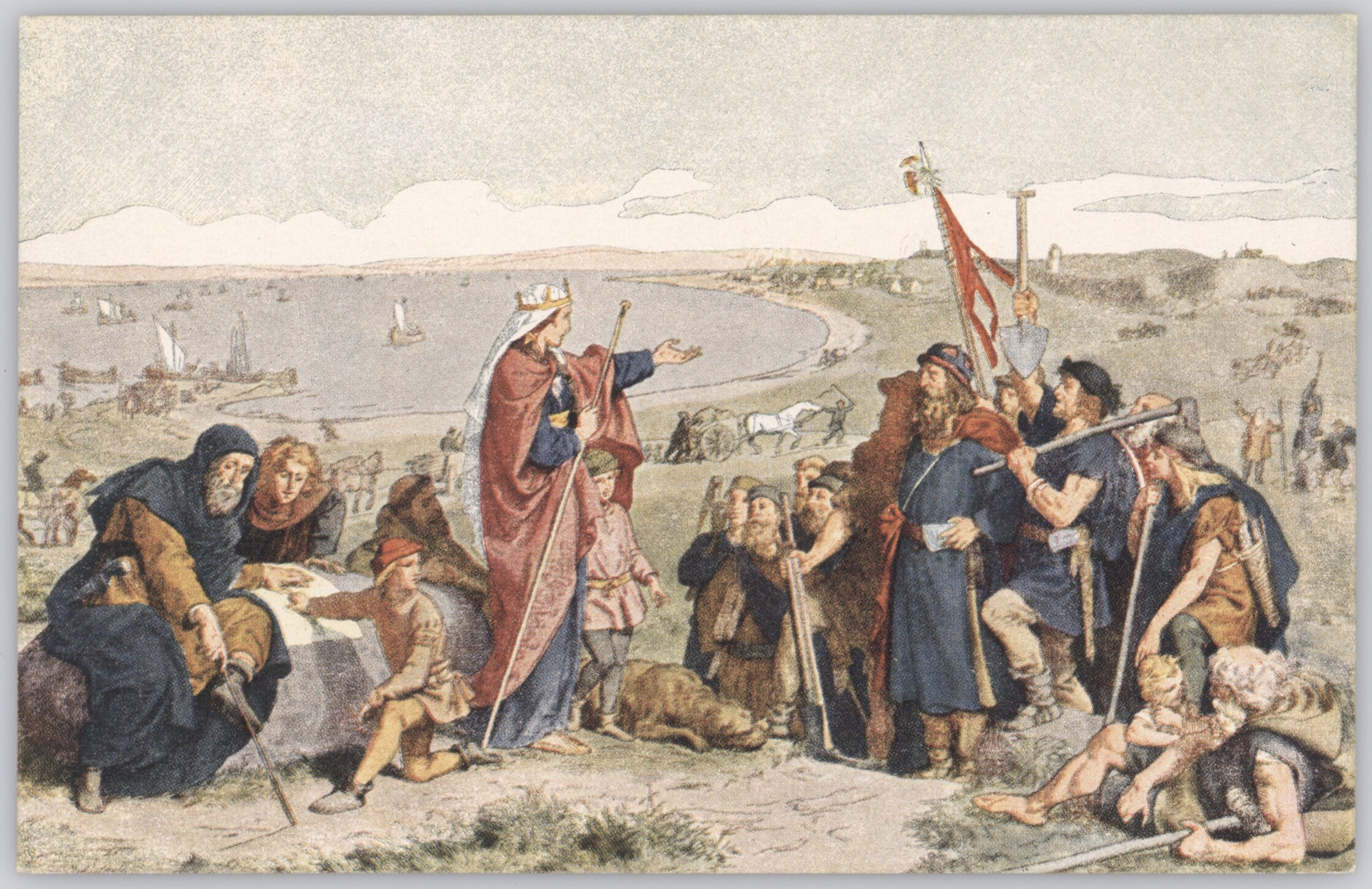
Thyra Danebod at Dannevirke

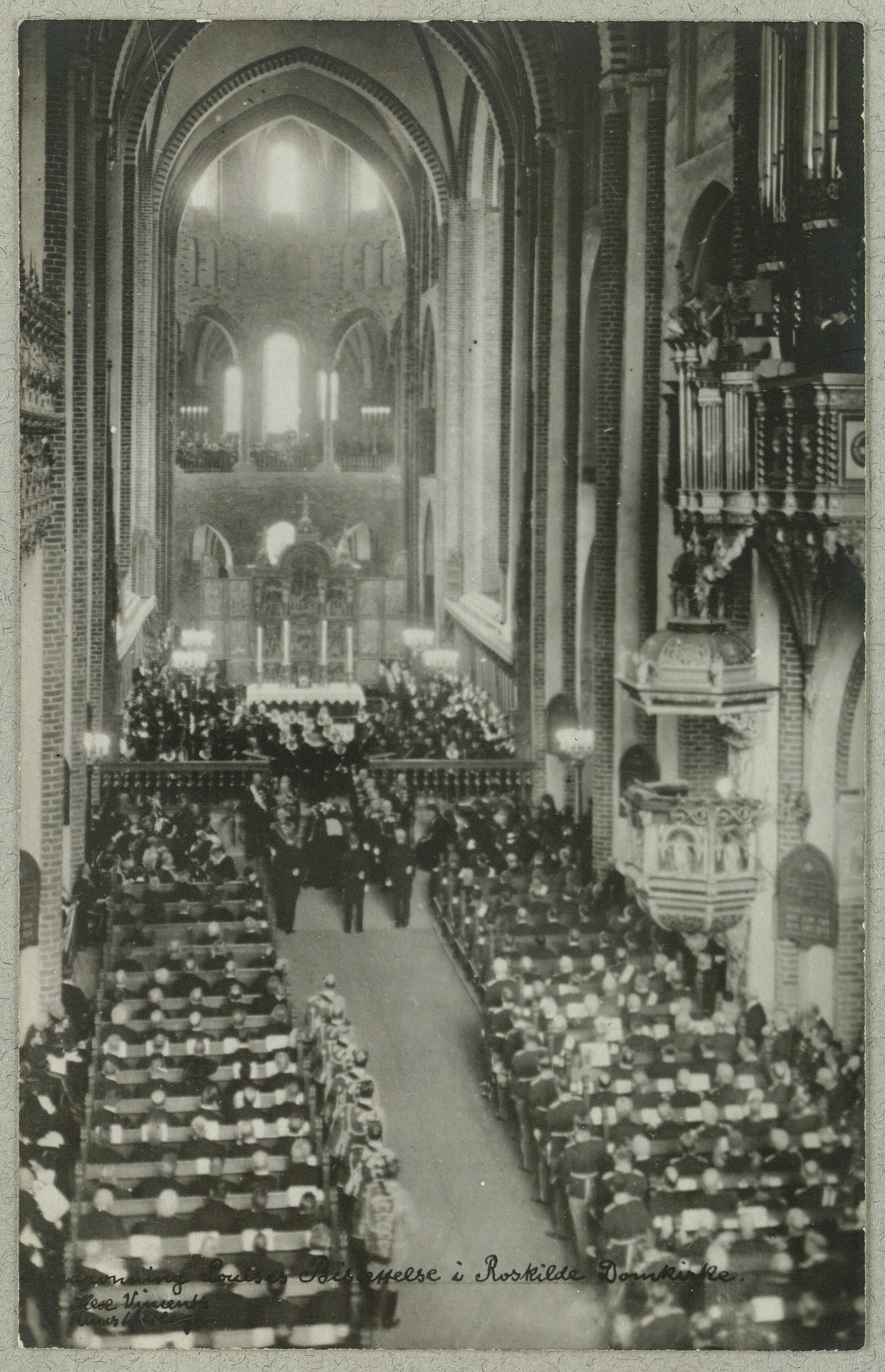
The funeral of Queen Dowager Louise in Roskilde Cathedral
