= Janus Laurentius Ridter =

Danish painter and illustrator

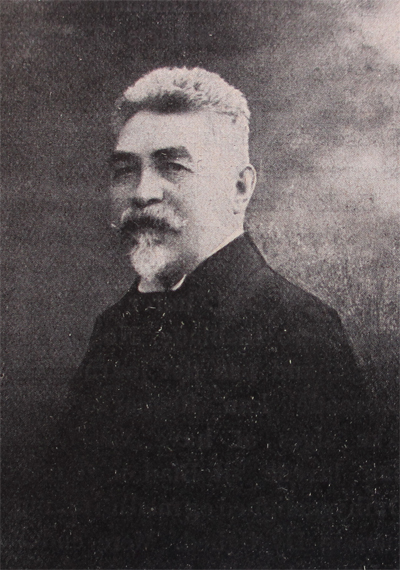
- Photograph of Janus Laurentius Ridter
- Born: 14 August 1854; Blåkrog, Denmark
- Died: 30 November 1921 (aged 67); Copenhagen, Denmark
- Education: Royal Danish Academy of Fine Arts
- Known for: Drawing from Copenhagen

Janus (Ianus) Laurentius Jørgensen Ridter (14 August 1854 – 30 November 1921) was a Danish painter and illustrator. He is remembered above all for his illustrations of Danish industrial establishments in the 1880s and his topographical watercolours and drawings of Copenhagen in the 1890s and 1900s.

== Early life ==
Ridter was born in Aakirkeby on the island of Bornholm as the son of taylor Jørgen Ridder and his wife Cecilie Margrethe Larsdatter. He apprenticed as a book seller but from an early age practiced his talent for painting and drawing.

== Career ==
In 1874, Illustreret Tidende accepted a few of his drawings and from 1887 he worked full-time as an artist. In 1892, he enrolled at Copenhagen Technical School and also studied privately with the painter Carl Martin Soya-Jensen. He was admitted to the Royal Danish Academy of Fine Arts in November 1893 was a student there until January 1897.

Ridter created numerous watercolours from Copenhagen. From 1905 Ridter commenced his career as illustrator for C. Ferslew & Co.'s publications (De Ferslewske Blade), especially Aftenposten where he worked from 1906 to 1915.

He died in 1921 and is buried at Bispebjerg Cemetery.

== Works ==
Together with Johan Thorsø, Ridter created the illustrations of Danish industrial enterprises in Danmarks industrielle Etablissementer which was published in 1887–89.

Many of Ridter's watercolours are preserved in the collections of Museum of Copenhagen and Øregård Museum.

== Gallery ==
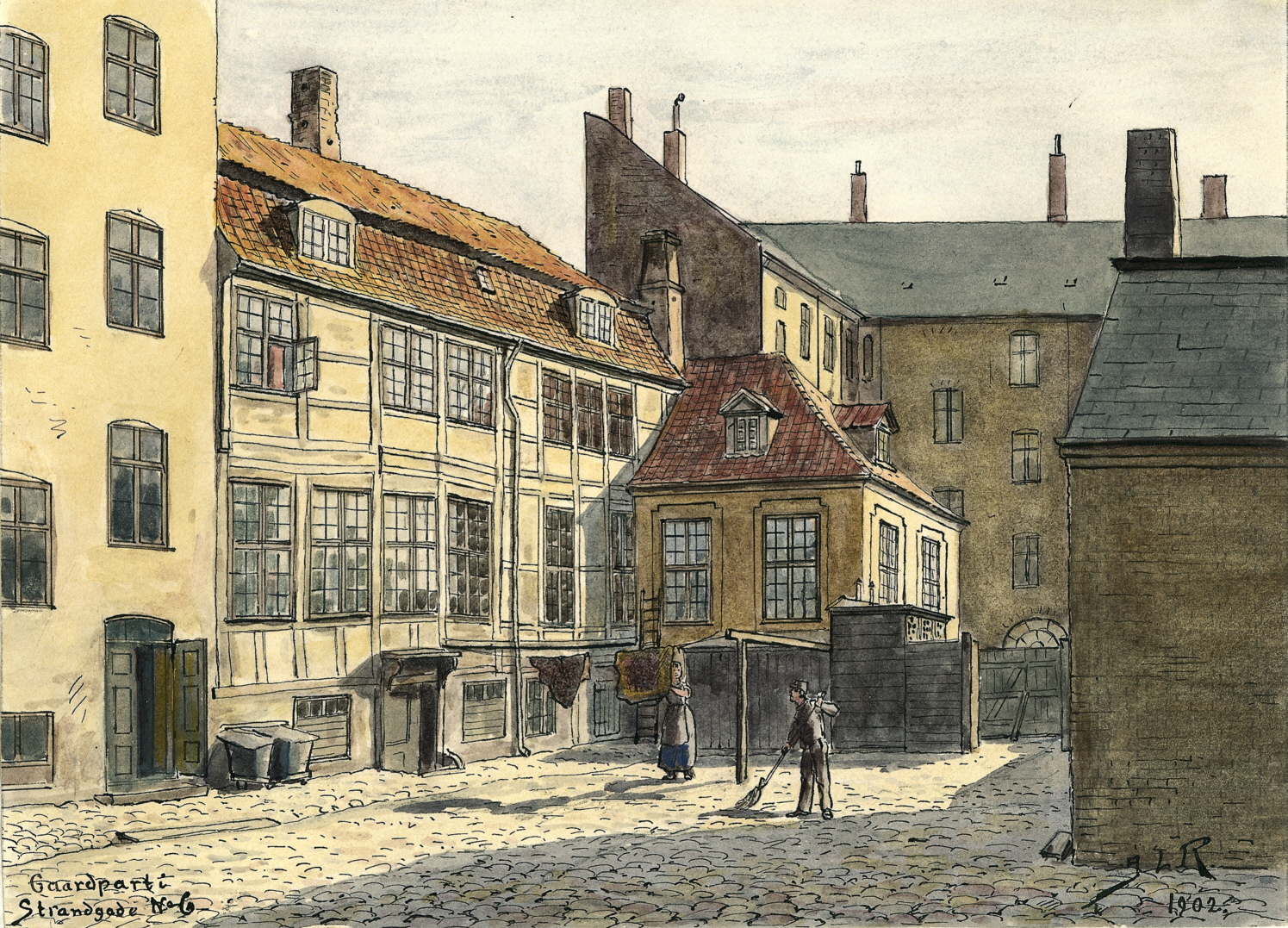
The yard at Lehn's House on Strandgade in Christianshavn (1902)

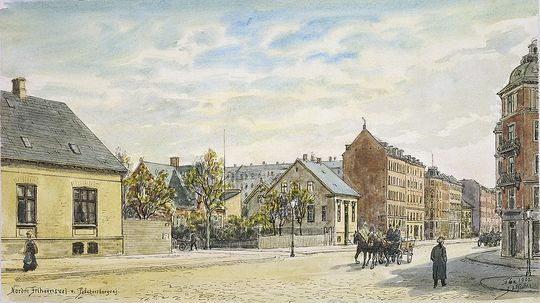
Nordre Frihavnsvej in Østerbro (1902)

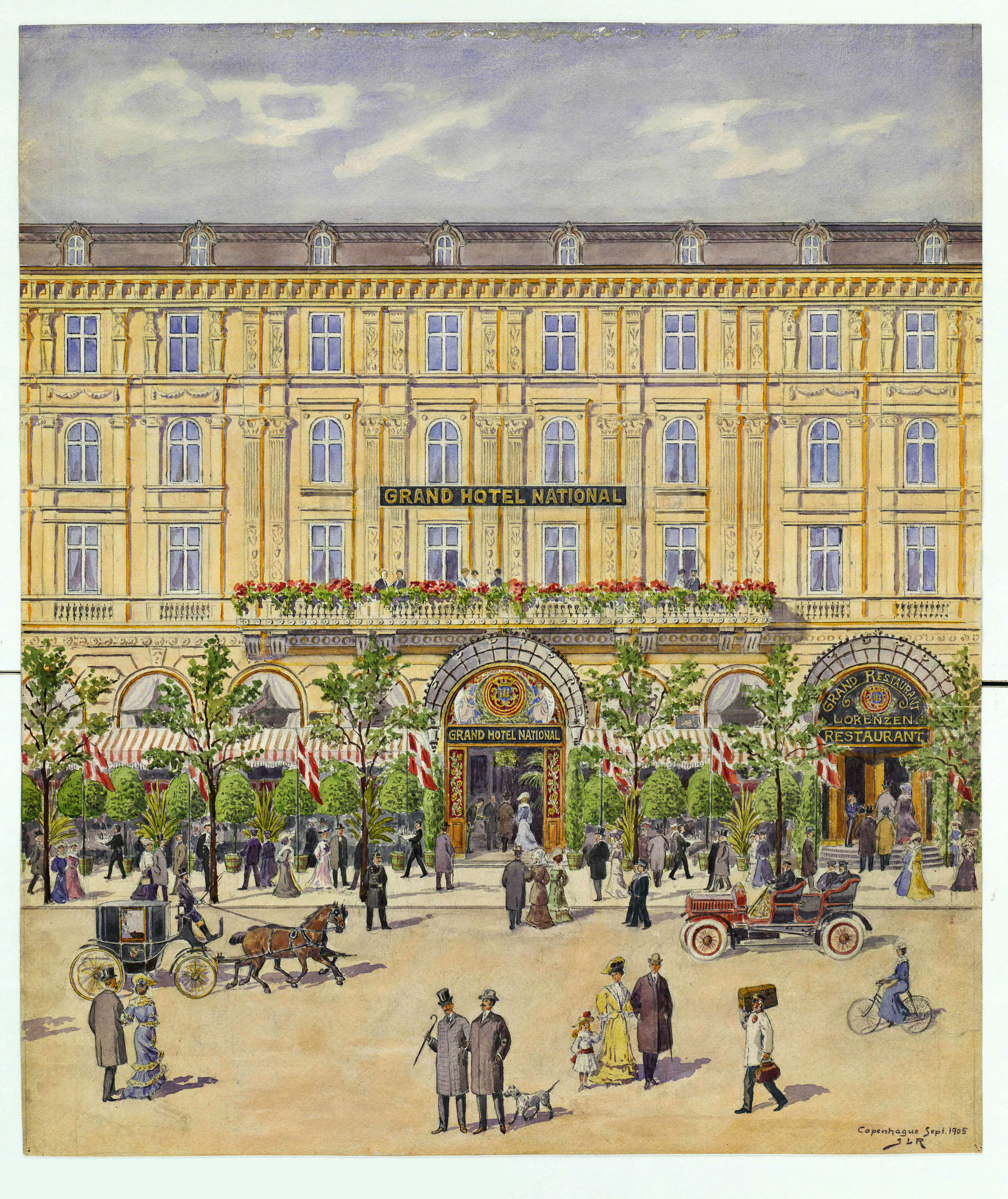
The now demolished Grand Hotel Nord on Vesterbrogade in Vesterbro (1905)

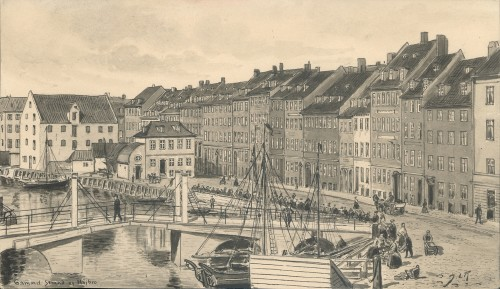
Gammel Strand with the old Højbro Bridge in the foreground (c.1850)

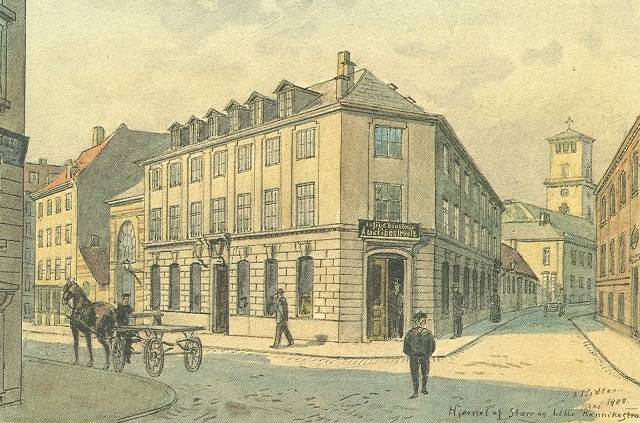
Store Kannikestræde (c. 1850)

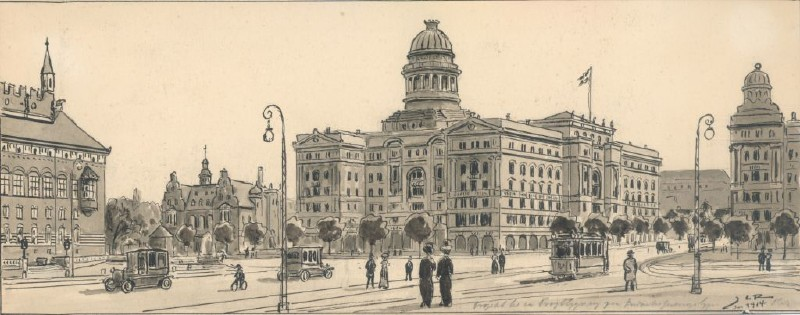
City Hall Square

== See also ==
- Christian Bayer
- Alex Vincents Kunstforlag
