= Julius Villiam Gudmand-Høyer =

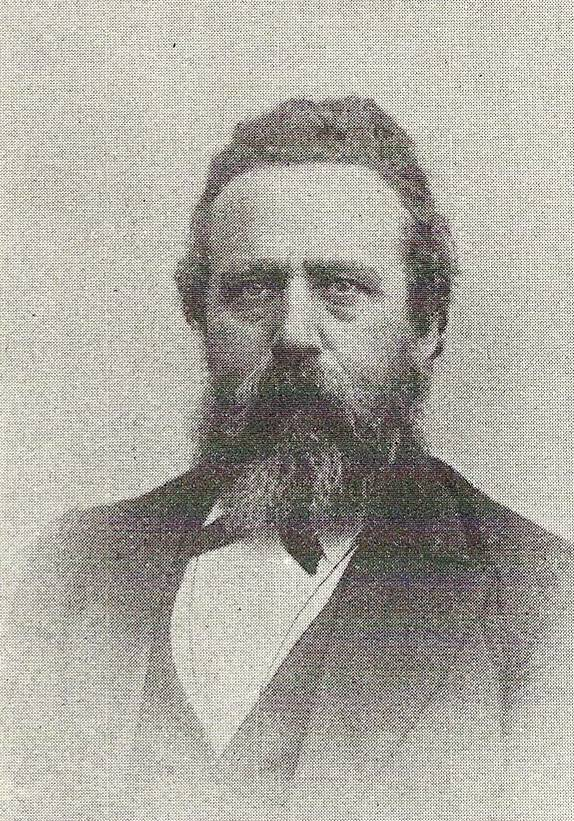

Julius Villiam Gudmand-Høyer (13 June 1841 – 8 September 1915) was a Danish teacher, librarian, novelist, and playwright. Gudmand-Høyer's works are considered to belong to a genre called schoolteacher literature, which flourished in Denmark from the middle of the 19th century to the First World War.

== Selected works ==
=== Novels ===
- Den hvide Pige paa Bogø (The White Girl on Bogø)
- Katrine Kulovn
- Kjærligheds Sejr (Victory of Love)
- Sorte Ellen og Hendes Søn (Black Ellen and her Son, later dramatized)

=== Plays ===
- To Fortællinger (Two Tales)
- Don Juan i Knibe (Don Juan in Trouble)
- Frieri ved Kommisjonær (Courtship by Commissioner)

=== Edited collections ===
- Nye og gamle Viser af og for Danske Folk (New and old Shows by and for Danish People)
- Fortegnelse over den classenske bogsamling i Nykjøbing paa Falster (List of the classical book collection in Nykjøbing on Falster)
