= Johannes Rehling =

Danish colonial administrator

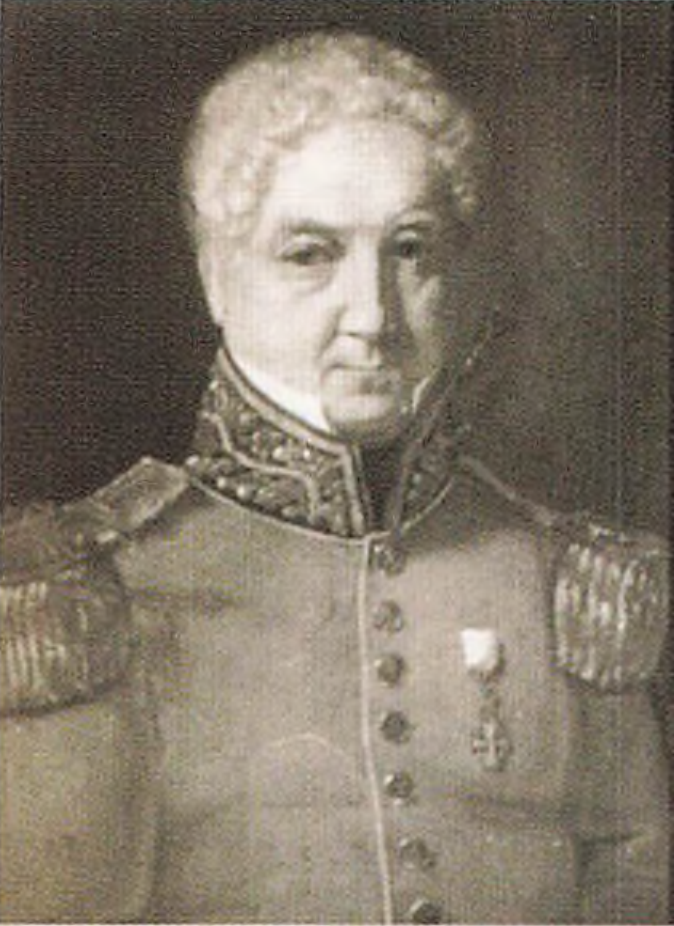
- Portrait of Johannes Rehling, possibly by David Monies

44th Governor of Tranquebar
- In office 1 May 1838 – 18 June 1841
- Monarchs: Frederick VI; Christian VIII
- Preceded by: Konrad Mourier
- Succeeded by: Christian Tiemroth

23rd Governor of Frederiknagore
- In office 22 February 1834 – 1 May 1838
- Monarch: Frederick VI
- Preceded by: Johan Boeck
- Succeeded by: Peder Hansen

Personal details
- Born: 17 August 1775 Egebjerg, Odsherred
- Died: 18 June 1841 (aged 65) Tranquebar
- Spouses: Augusta Erhardt (m. 1802; died 1809); Mette Haagen (m. 1819)
- Children: (see § Personal life)
- Parent(s): Andreas Rehling; Susanne Beckmann

Military service
- Allegiance: Denmark-Norway 1804–1814; Denmark 1814–1841
- Rank: Colonel

Johannes Rehling (17 August 1775- 18 June 1841) was a Danish colonial administrator. He served as governor of Frederiksnagore from 1835 to 1838 and as governor of Tranquebar from 1838 to 1841.

== Early life and education ==
Rehling was born on 17 August 1775 in Egeberg, Odsherred, the son of Lutheran minister Andreas Johan Rehling (1790-) and Susanne Franck Beckmann (1789-). His father was later appointed as provost of Frederiksborg Chapel and parish priest of Hillerød. Rehling matriculated from Frederiksborg Latin School in 1793. He earned a law degree from the University of Copenhagen in 1803.

== Career ==
On 7 November 1804, Rehling was appointed as bailiff (byfoged) and chief of police of Tranquebar. On 5 May 1805, he departed from Copenhagen on board the Kronprins Frederik. The ship arrived at Frederiksnagore on 10 December. On 3 January 1805, he continued to Tranquebar on board the Twee Gisberts, arriving there two days later. During the British occupation of Tranquebar in 1808—15, Rehling remained in his office.

On 22 November 1816, he was appointed as 3rd Member of the Government Council, judge, and chief auctioneer. On 1 May 1822, he was awarded the title of justitsråd. On 31 July 1824, he was promoted to 2nd Member of the Government Council. In 1833–, due to health issues, he and his family spent around a year in Denmark. On 22 February 1834, he was appointed as governor (chef) of Frederiksnagore. On 15 July, he was awarded the rank of colonel. The Rehling family returned to Tranquebar on board the Den danske Eg. On 1 August, he arrived at Frederiksnagore (governor from 1 November). On 136 September 1837, he was appointed as governor of Tranquebar with effect from 1 May the following year.

== Personal life ==
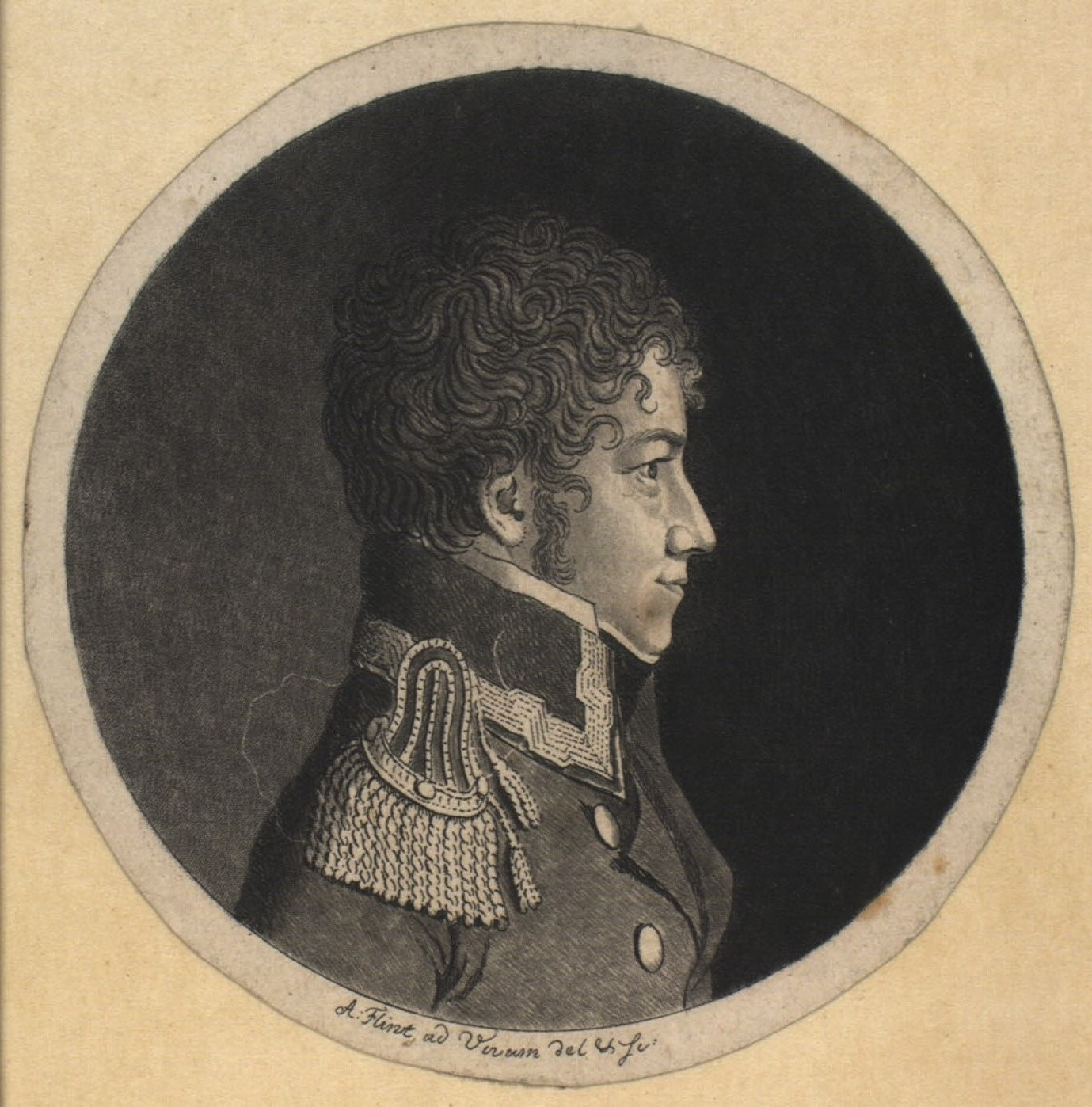
Johannes Rehling

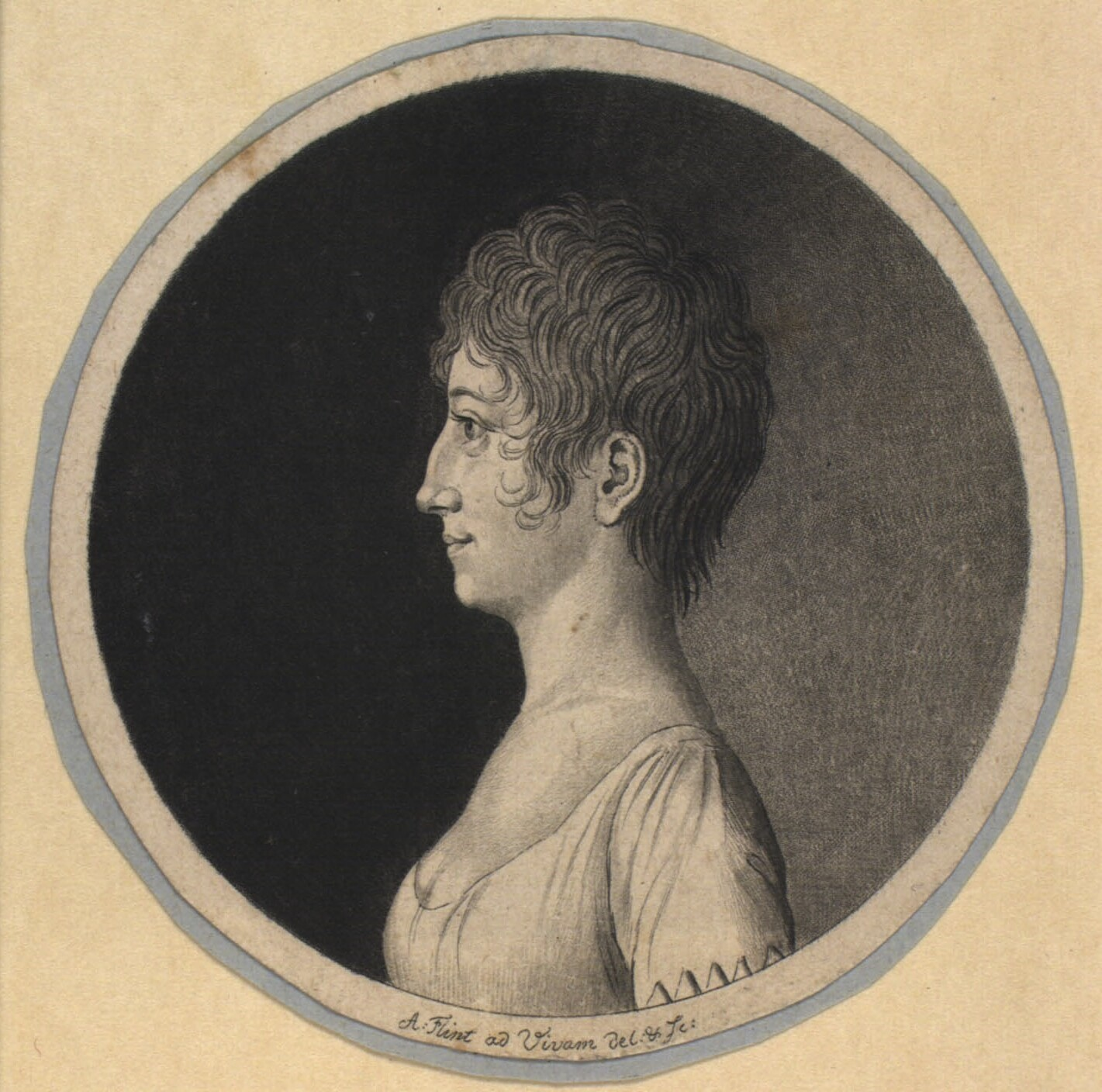
Frederica Augusta Rehling.

On 7 August 1802, Rehling was married to Augusta Frederika Erhardt (died 8 December 1809). She was the daughter of civil servant Frants Engelbrecht Ehrhardt and Sophie Elisabeth Borchhorst, Johannes and Augusta Frederikke Rehling had one daughter: 1. August Johan Adolph Rehling (1806-1860), She would later marry Charlotte Nosky Jansen.

On 9 May 1819m Rehling married to Mette Maria Stricker (1796-). She was the daughter of Herman Dominicus Didriksen Beckman and Maren Hansdatter Haagen. Ger dather was commandant of Fansborg Fortress. Johannes and Mette Marie Rehling had nine children.

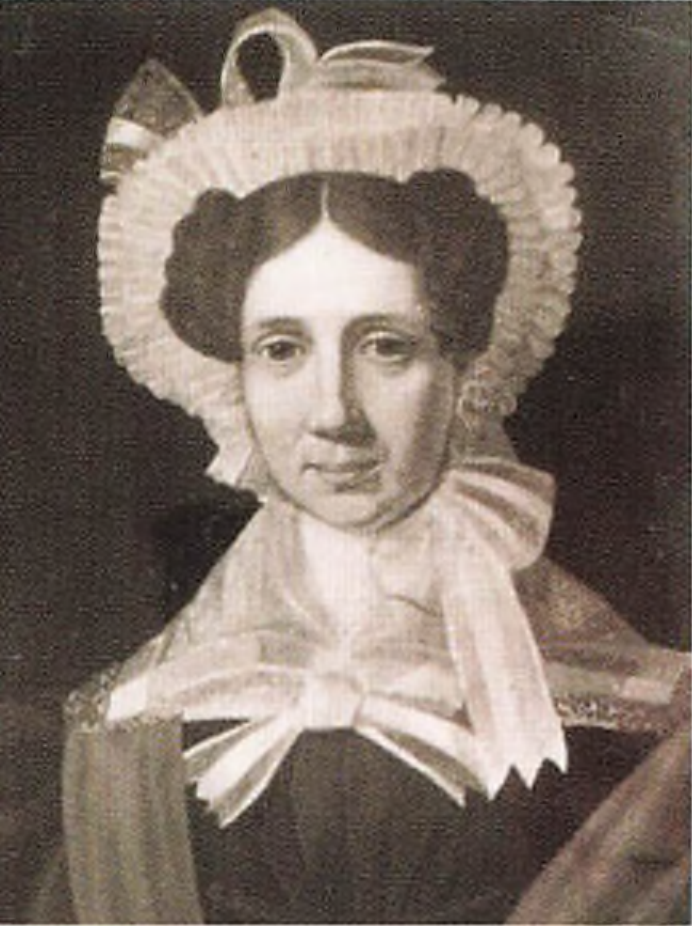
Mette Marie Rehling.

Rehling died on 18 June 1841 in Tranquebar. He survived two of his sons. His widow and four of his children returned to Denmark. Three sons remained in India. The sons Herman (1814-1872) and Ditleff (1721-1873) became indigo planters in Bengal. The son Johan Andreas Rehling (1819-1867) settled as atrader and shipowner in Batavia. Mette Marie Rehling settled in Helsingør after moving back to Denmark. The son Otto Regling (1712-1892) became a councilman and manager of Sparekassen for Helsingør og Omegn (1862-1892). The son Gerhardt Rehling (1715-1895) became bailiff (herredsfoged) of Hads Herred.

In 1823, Rejling bought a house on Kongensgade at auction. The building is now home to a girls' school. Some of the Rehling family's letters from India have been published.
