= Christian Bayer =

Danish illustrator

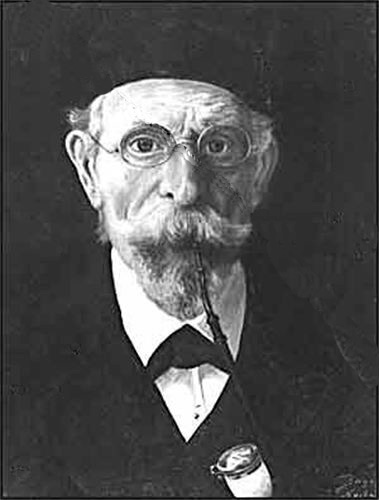
- Born: 6 July 1841; Copenhagen, Denmark
- Died: 22 November 1933 (aged 92); Copenhagen, Denmark
- Known for: Illustrations of Copenhagen

Christian Frederik Bayer (6 July 1841 – 22 November 1933) was a Danish illustrator. He is remembered for his topographical drawings and watercolours from Copenhagen, many of which were featured on postcards.

== Personal life ==
Christian Bayer was born in Copenhagen on 6 July 1841. He was the son of painter Johan Christian Theodore Bayer and Sophie Frederikke Vilhelmine Dauny. He married Andrea Margrethe Kristine Rasmussen (1843–1933) in 1868.

== Career ==
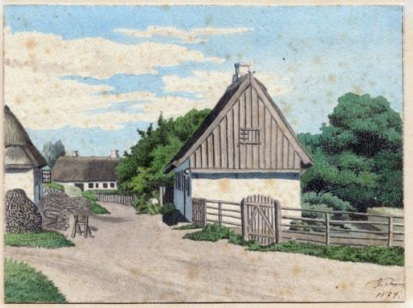
Illustration of Gammel Byvej, 1874

Bayer apprenticed first under bookseller and publisher F. H. Eibe in from 1854 to 1860. He then apprenticed under xylographer A. C. F. Flinch between 1860 and 1863. He also trained for half a year in Henneberg and Rosenstand's xylographic workshop and in 1863 while studying painting under Johannes Exner. He later graduated from the Technical Institute in Copenhagen.

Bayer's artistic output remained a side occupation while he worked for the bank Bikuben as an accountant. He created a vast number of topographical drawings and watercolours from Copenhagen. He also created many portraits, many of which featured celebrities.

Bayer's works were featured on a series of 32 postcards from Alex. Vincents Kunstforlag which were both available in black-and-white and colour.
