= Ny Stokkerup =

Building in Lyngby-Taarbæk Municipality, Denmark

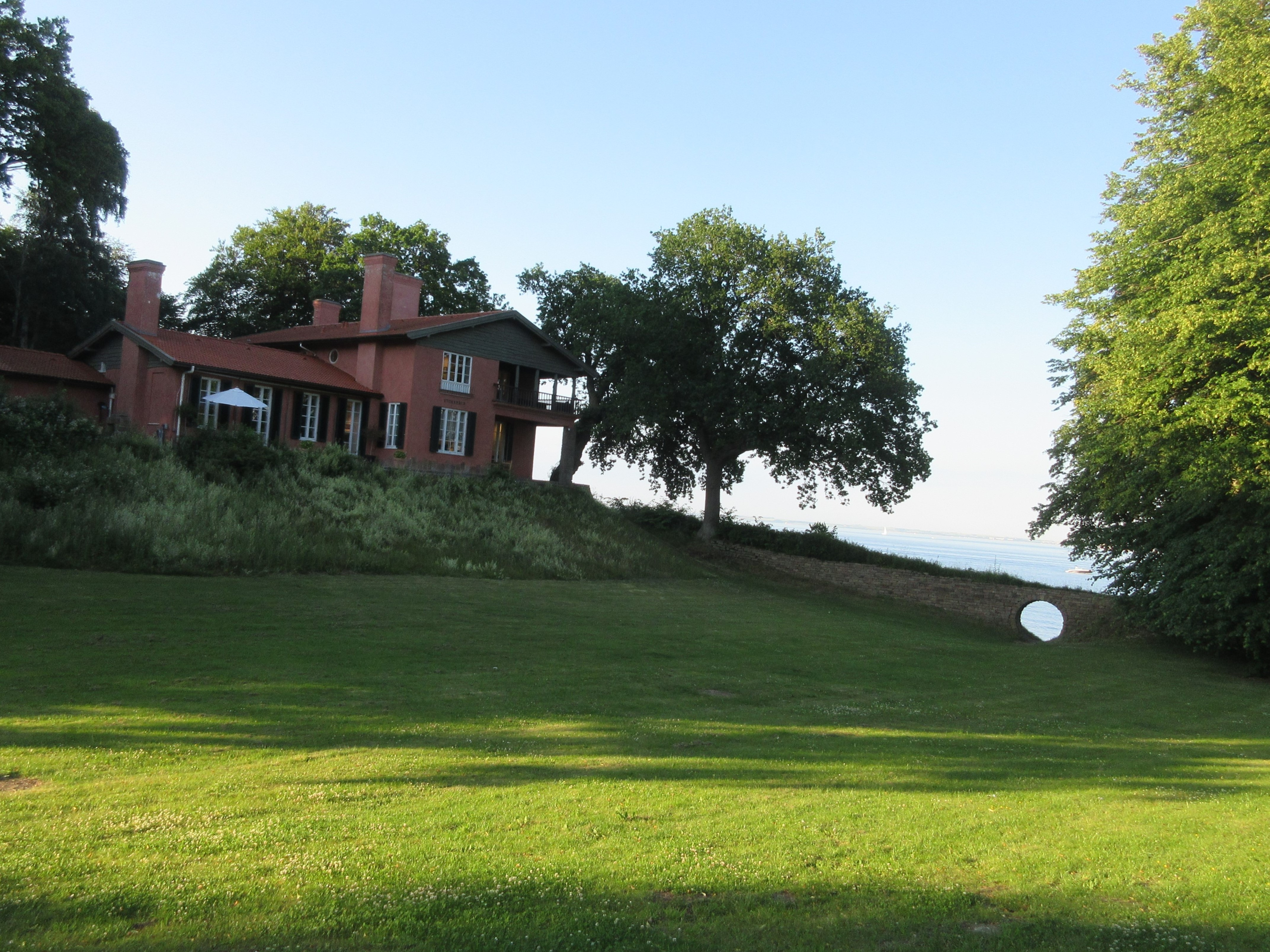
- Interactive map of the Ny Stokkerup area

General information
- Location: Taarbæk, Rudersdal Municipality, Vedbæk Strandvej 373, 2950 Vedbæk, Denmark
- Coordinates: 55°47′59.2″N 12°35′16.8″E
- Construction started: 1933

Design and construction
- Architect: Henning Hansen

Ny Stokkerup (lit. New Stokkerup) is a former country house in Springforbi, Lyngby-Taarbæk Municipality, some ten kilometres north of central Copenhagen, Denmark. The present house was constructed in 1933 for Bøje Benzon to designs by architect Henning Hansen. The house replaced another house, known simply as Stokkerup, which was constructed for Benzon's great-grandfather Alfred Hage in the 1860s.

The adjacent Moon Bridge (Danish: Månebroen) was listed in the Danish registry of protected buildings and places in 2023. It is one of few surviving features from a garden created for Benzon by Carl Theodor Sørensen in 1934.

== History ==
=== Background ===
Stokkerup was originally the name of a small village located a little to the southwest of where the Hermitage Hunting Lodge stands today. The village consisted of nine farms. It was dissolved when Jægersborg Dyrehave was created in 1670. Stokkerupgaard and Stokkerup Kro were moved to new locations on the coast. The entire area along the coast (Stokkerupgaard and Stokkerup Kro) was acquired by the Drewsen family at Strandmøllen in 1697. In the first half of the 19th century, Johan Christian Drewsen began to sell the land off in lots. Stokkerup (Stokkerupgård) was sold to the politician Peter Georg Bang.

=== Hage family ===
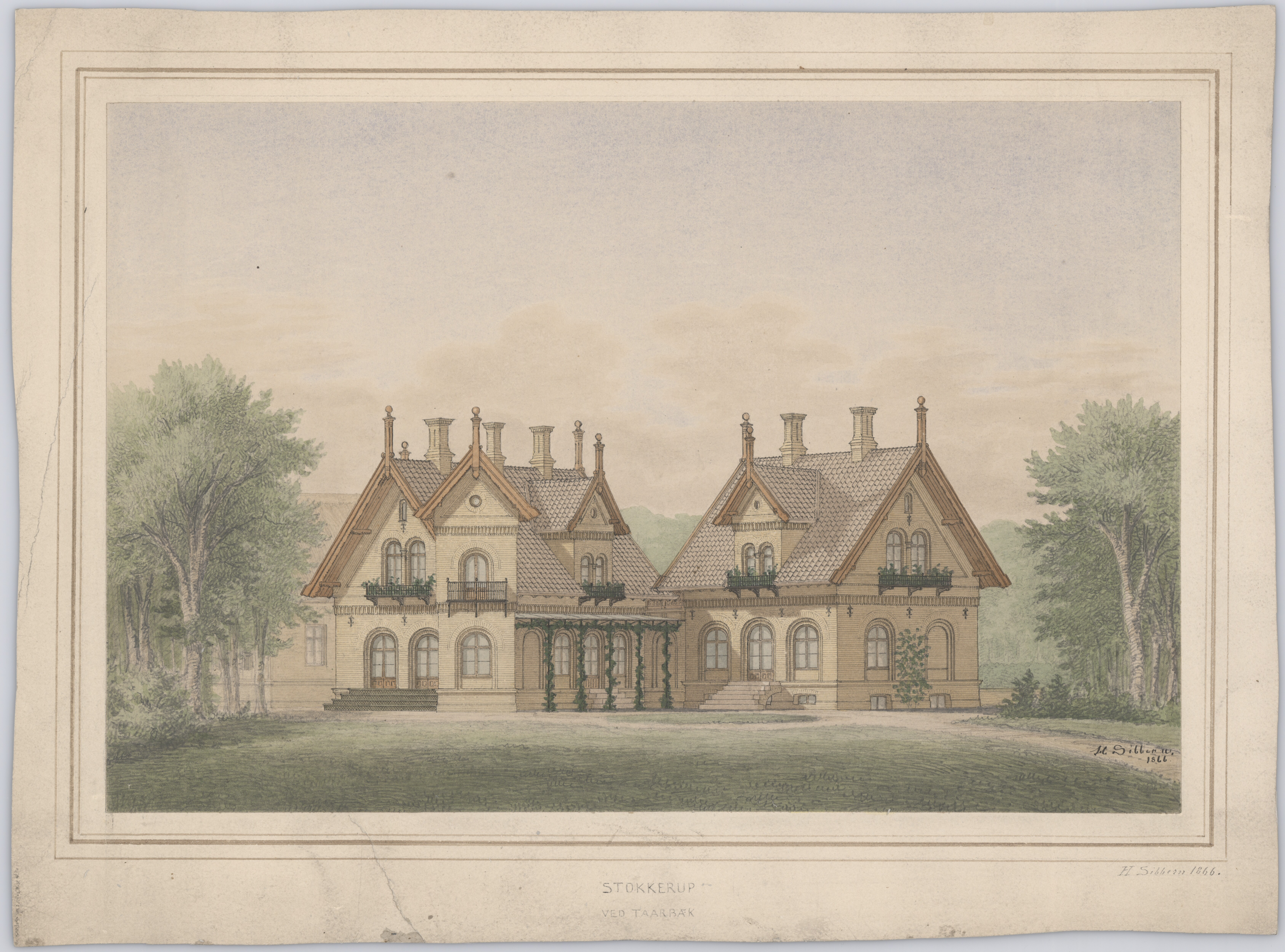
Sibbern: Stokkerup.

In 1849, Stokkerup was acquired by the businessman and politician Alfred Hage. The house was later destroyed by fire. A new house was constructed for Hae in 1860 at a new site a little firther to the north. After another fire, the house was rebuilt with the assistance of the architect Henrik Steffens Sibbern in 1865. The interior was decorated by Georg Hilker.

In 1861, Hage purchased Oremandsgaard near Præstø. He was also the owner of several estates in Sweden. In 1862, he also purchased Nivaagaard and several other farms at Nivå.

Hage was married to Frederikke Vilhelmine Faber (1810–1891). She kept Stokkerup after her husband's death in 1872. Their daughter Wilhelmine was married to the composer Peter Heise. He died at Stokkerup on 12 September 1879. Another daughter, Johanne, who married the sculptor Vilhelm Bissen, died in labour with their first child. The daughter was given the name Johanne after her mother. She was later married to the industrialist Alfred Benzon. They became the owners of Stokkerup in 1891. In the 1890s, Benzon sold the northern part of the property to his brother Otto Benzon. He used it for the construction of the country house Brinken (1895).

=== Bøje Benzon and the new house ===
Alfred Benzon died in 1932. Stokkerup was then taken over by their son Bøje Benzon. He charged the architect Henning Hansen with the design of a new house. Earlier in his career, Hansen had already designed the summer residence Hegnslund for Frederik Hegel in the same area. The landscape architect Carl Theodor. Sørensen was commissioned to design the garden.

== Architecture ==
Ny Stokkerup was constructed in 1933 to designs by Henning Hansen. The house has been described as "a house in Basque style".

== List of owners ==
- (?–1848) Peter Georg Bang
- (1849–1872) Alfred Hage
- (1762–1782) Wilhelmine Hage, née Faber
- (1903–1932) Alfred Benzon
- (1933–1976) Bøje Benzon
