= Kronprinsessegade 20 =

Building in Copenhagen

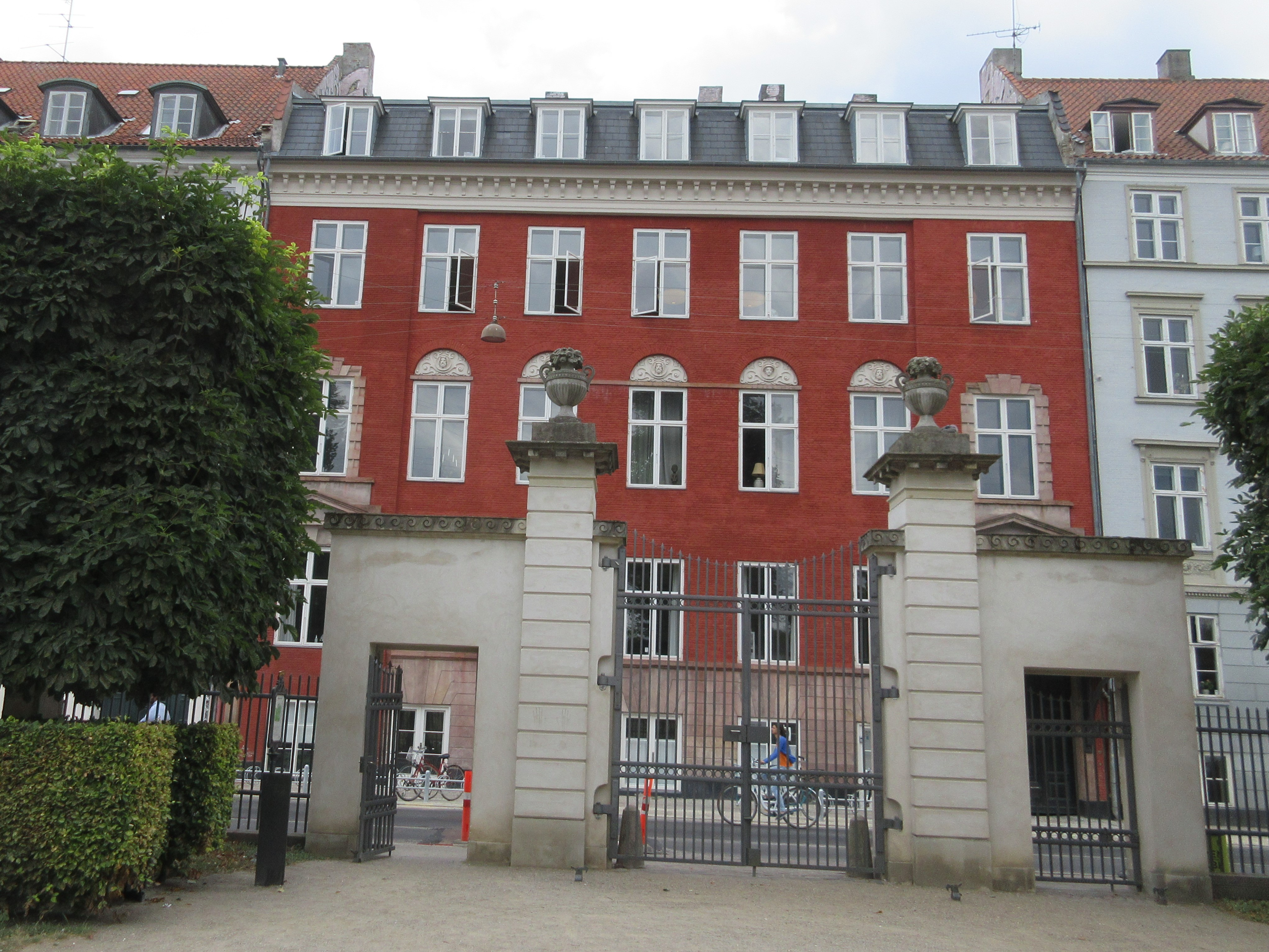
- Interactive map of the Kronprinsessegade 20 area

General information
- Architectural style: Neoclassical
- Location: Copenhagen, Denmark
- Coordinates: 55°41′1.01″N 12°34′56.34″E
- Completed: 1806

Design and construction
- Architects: Jørgen Henrich Rawert and Andreas Hallander

Kronprinsessegade 20 is a Neoclassical property overlooking one of the entrances to Rosenborg Castle Garden in central Copenhagen, Denmark. It was listed on the Danish registry of protected buildings and places in 1945.

== History ==
=== Early history ===
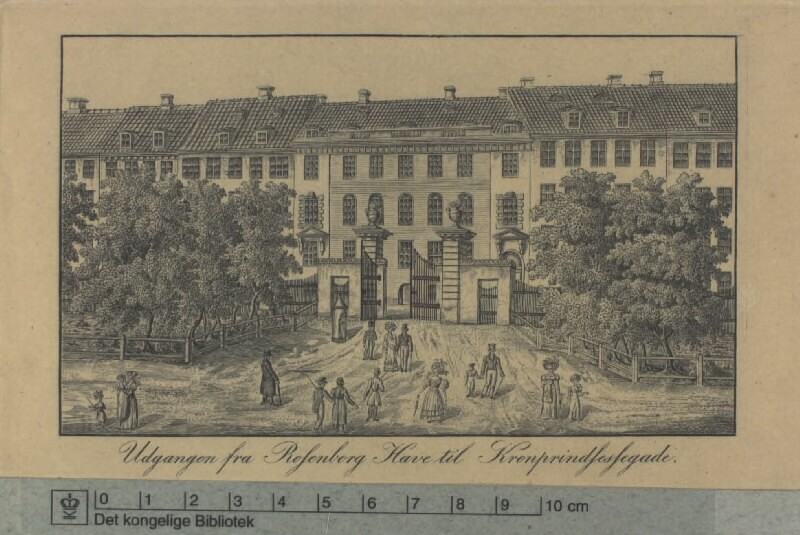
Kronprinsessegade seen from Rosenborg Gardens, 1810

Kronprinsessegade 20 was built by city builder Jørgen Henrich Rawert and Andreas Hallander in 1805–1806. The property was listed in the new cadastre of 19+7 as No. 392 in St. Ann's West Quarter.

The property was shortly thereafter sold to wine merchant Petges. His property was damaged during the British bombardment on 2–5 September the same year. He already moved in 1808.

Christian Zartmann (1793–1853), a military officer, lived in the building in 1827. The naval officer C. D. von Hegerman-Lindencrone (1807–1893) was a resident in both 1830 and 1832.

In 1832, Edward Brown (1787-) rented an 11-room apartment in the building. He was the youngest son of former Governor-General of Danish India David Brown. Edward Brown had returned to Copenhagen after making a fortune in the indigo industry and on trade in India. He owned Gurrehus north of Copenhagen. He later suffered great losses on the bankruptcy of India-based Fergusson & Co.. In 1838, he emigrated to Australia.

=== 1834 census ===
Adam Mogens Wenzel von Mattner, a Major-General and chamberlain, resided on the ground floor at the 1834 census. He lived there with his wife Anna Lucretia (née Lytton), their daughters Adelaide and Eugenie von Mattner, a husjomfru, two maids (one of them black), a male servant and a coachman. Henry Wheaton, United States Chargé d'affaires, resided on the first floor with his wife Catharine Wheatonm their four children /aged seven to 16), two male servants and four maids. Frederik Christian Holm, a master shoemaker, resided, in the basement with his wife Marie Christine Schvindt, their five children (aged six to 15), a shoemaker (employee), a shoemaker's apprentice and the widow Marie Christine Schvindt.

=== 1840 census ===
The konferesnråd Peder Pedersen (1774–1851) resided in the ground-floor apartment at the 1840 census. He lived there with his wife Ane Caroline Pedersen (née Lugthon Smith, 1689s-1878(, their three children (aged eight to 13), one male servant and four maids. The daughter Anne Sophy Pedersen (1824–1911) would later marry the lawyer Carl Christian Vilhelm Liebe(1820–1900). The two sons William and Julius would both become naval officers. Julius de Lancy Pedersen served as commandant of Christiansø. Consul Hambroe, who resided on the first floor, was in Finland with his family when the census took place. Only three maids and two male servants were therefore present in the home on the first floor. Sophie Elisabeth Holsten, widow of a general-lieutenant, resided on the second floor with her daughter Edle Sophie Holsten, 34-year-old Frederik Christian Holsten, a chamber maid, a female cook and a maid. Anders Petersen, a concierge, resided in the basement with his wife Karen Olsdatter and their two children (aged five and nine).

=== Alfred Hage ===
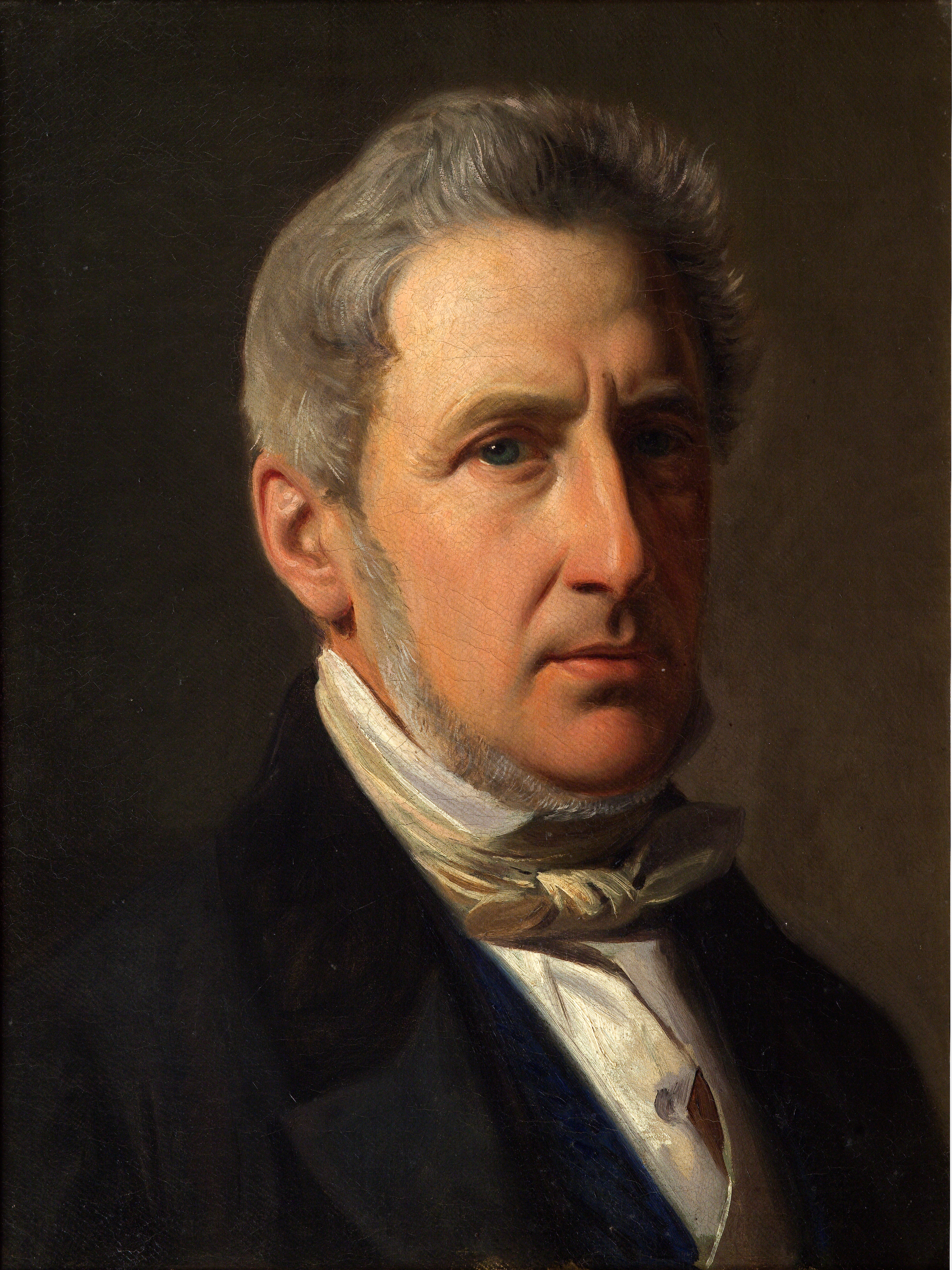
Alfred Hage

Alfred Hage, who had become a partner in H. Puggaard & Co. a few years earlier, lived in the building from 1843 to 1848. His property was home to five households at the 1845 census.

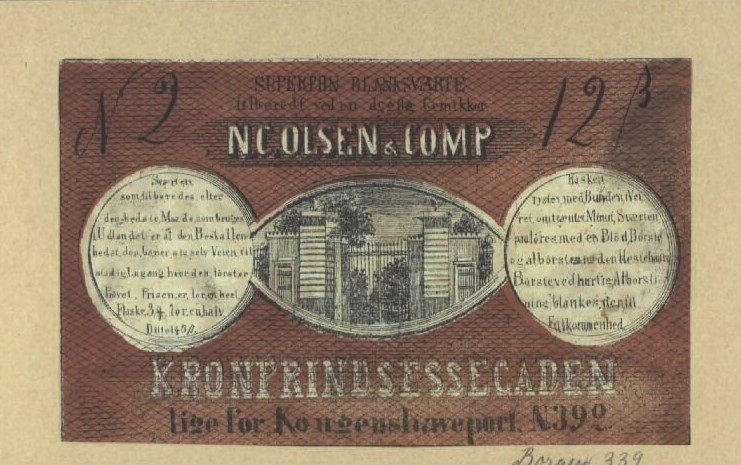
Advert from N. C. Olsen & Co.

Alfred Hage resided on the first floor with his wife Vilhelmine, their six children (aged two to 11), a governess, five maids and two male servants. Peter Pedersen, a konferensråd and former diplomat, resided on the second floor with his wife Ann Caroline Smith, their four children (aged three to 19), one male servant, a wet nurse and two maids. Baron de Adolph de Kiere, a diplomat born in Brügge, resided on the ground floor with his wife Baronesse de Kiere, their three children (aged five to 12), two male servants and three maids. Niels Carl Olsen, a master shoemaker, resided in the basement with his wife Johanne Christine, their one-year-old son, two shoemakers (employees) and one shoemaker's apprentice. Anders Petersen, the concierce, resided in the basement with his wife Karen Olsen and their two children (aged 10 and 11). Sophie Berg, a widow, resided in the garret with a three-year-old foster son and the unmarried woman Mathilde Nielsine Hartman.

Hage was involved with the National Liberal movement and wrote for the magazine Fædrelandet.When the slesvig-holsten deputation came to Copenhagen in March 1848, Hage invited them to stay in his home in Kronprinsessegade. Studenterkorpset placed guards outside the building.

In 1849, Hage moved to the fourth-floor apartment in the now demolished building at Rorvegade 2. His later homes were at Ny Kongensgade 6, Bredgade 45 and the Harsdorff House on Kongens Nytorv.

=== 1850s ===
The lawyer and politician Carl Christian Vilhelm Liebe (1820–1900) was a resident in 1850.

The Swedish embassy was located in the building in the 1850s. The Swedish envoy Elias Lagerheim and legation secretary E. Piper were both residents of the building in 1856.

=== Julius Blom ===
In the 1860s the building was acquired by master carpenter and director of the Copenhagen Fire Department Julius Blom. Blom's father Thomas Blom had, back in the beginning of the century, together with his brothers and mother, as Bloms Enke & Sønner, constructed the nearby buildings at the corner of Kronprinsessegade and Dronningens Tværgade. He owned the property until his death in 1900.

=== Ahlefeldt-Laurvig family ===
The property was later acquired by the Ahlefeldt-Laurvig family for use as their city home. Christian Johan Frederik Ahlefeldt Laurvig and his wife Johanne Ida Augusta Ahlefeldt Laurvig resided in the building with a large staff at the 1906 census. Dagmar Regitze Kaas stayed there with them as their guest.

== Architecture ==
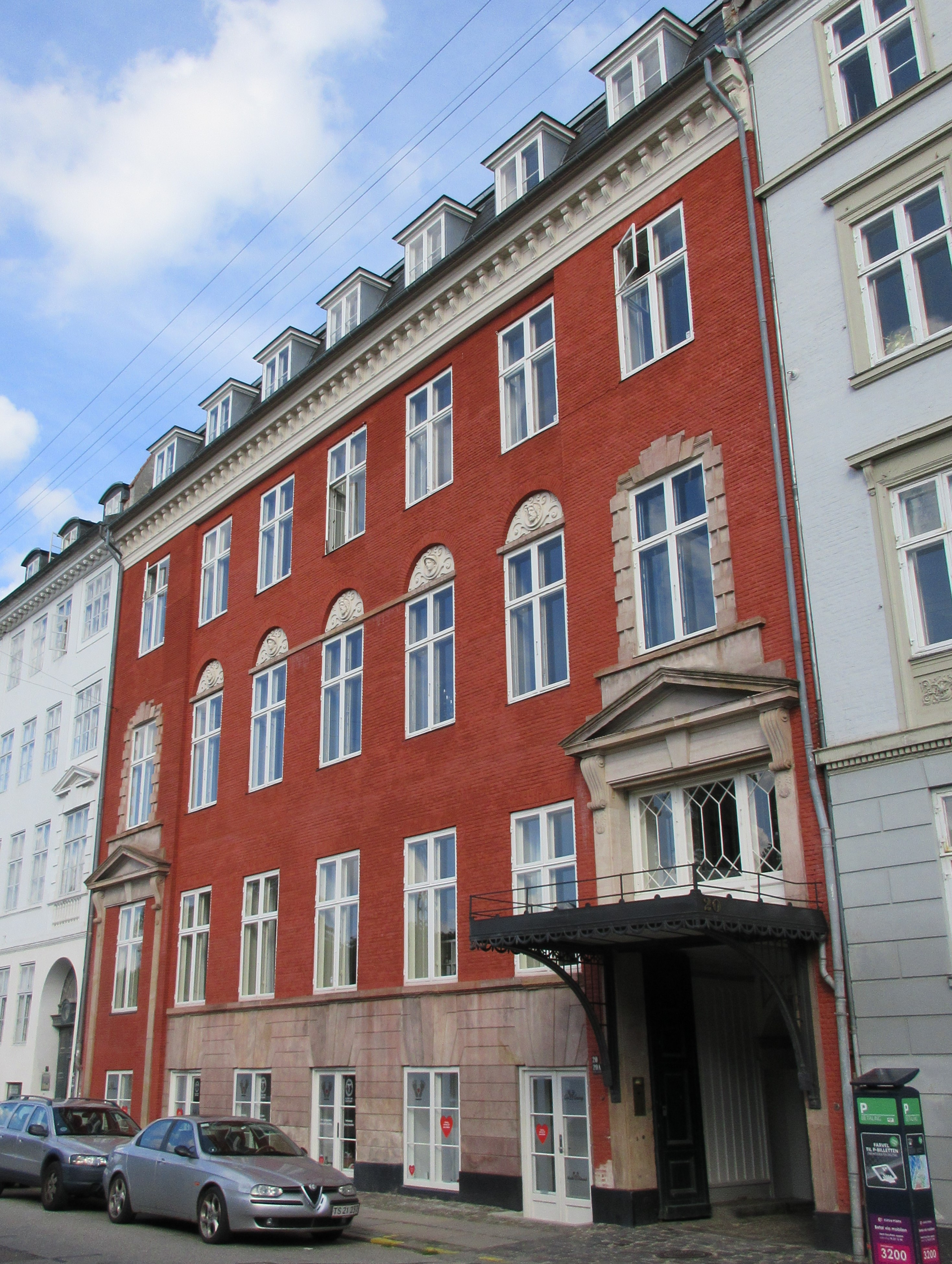
Kronprinsessegade 20

Kronprinsessegade 20 is seven bays wide and has slightly progressing, one-bay corner risalits at each end. The wall between the two corner risalits has grey dressing on the high cellar while the upper three floors stand in red-painted, blank brick. The windows of the corner risalits on the bottom floor have framing and are topped by triangular pediments. The windows of the two corner risalits on the second floor are surrounded by rusticated framing while there are semi-curcilar Tympana over the five central windows. The roof is a slate-clad Mansard roof with seven dormers and five chimneys. An attica was removed in the middle of the 19th century. Under the roof runs a white-painted cornice supported by brackets.

A rather clumpsy iron canopy over the gateway of the building doubles as a balcony on the first floor.

The gateway opens to a narrow courtyard. A four-storey, six-bay side wing extends from the rear side of the building along the north side of the courtyard. A nine-bay rear wing is located at the bottom of the courtyard.

== Gallery ==
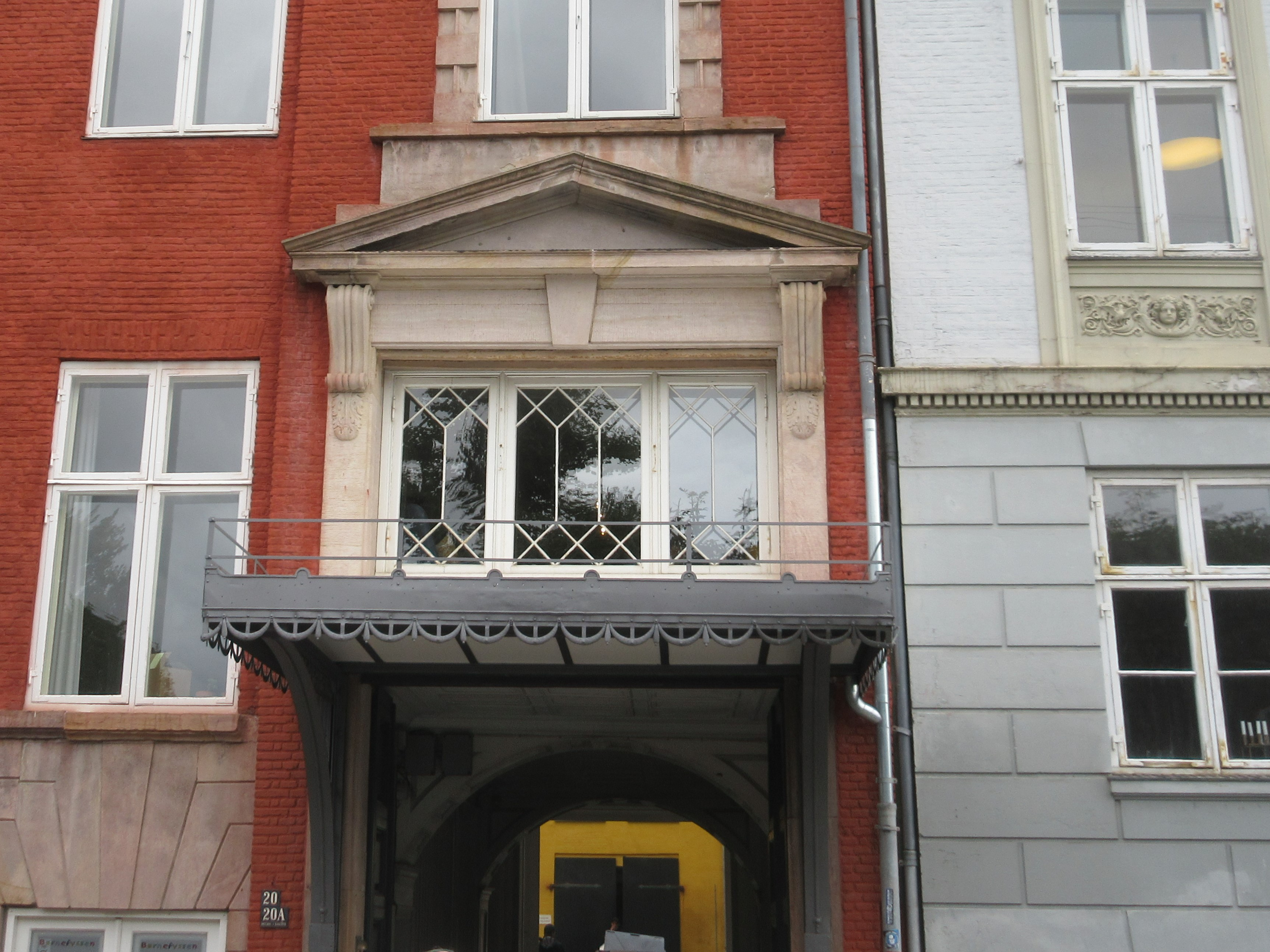
Detail of the facade.

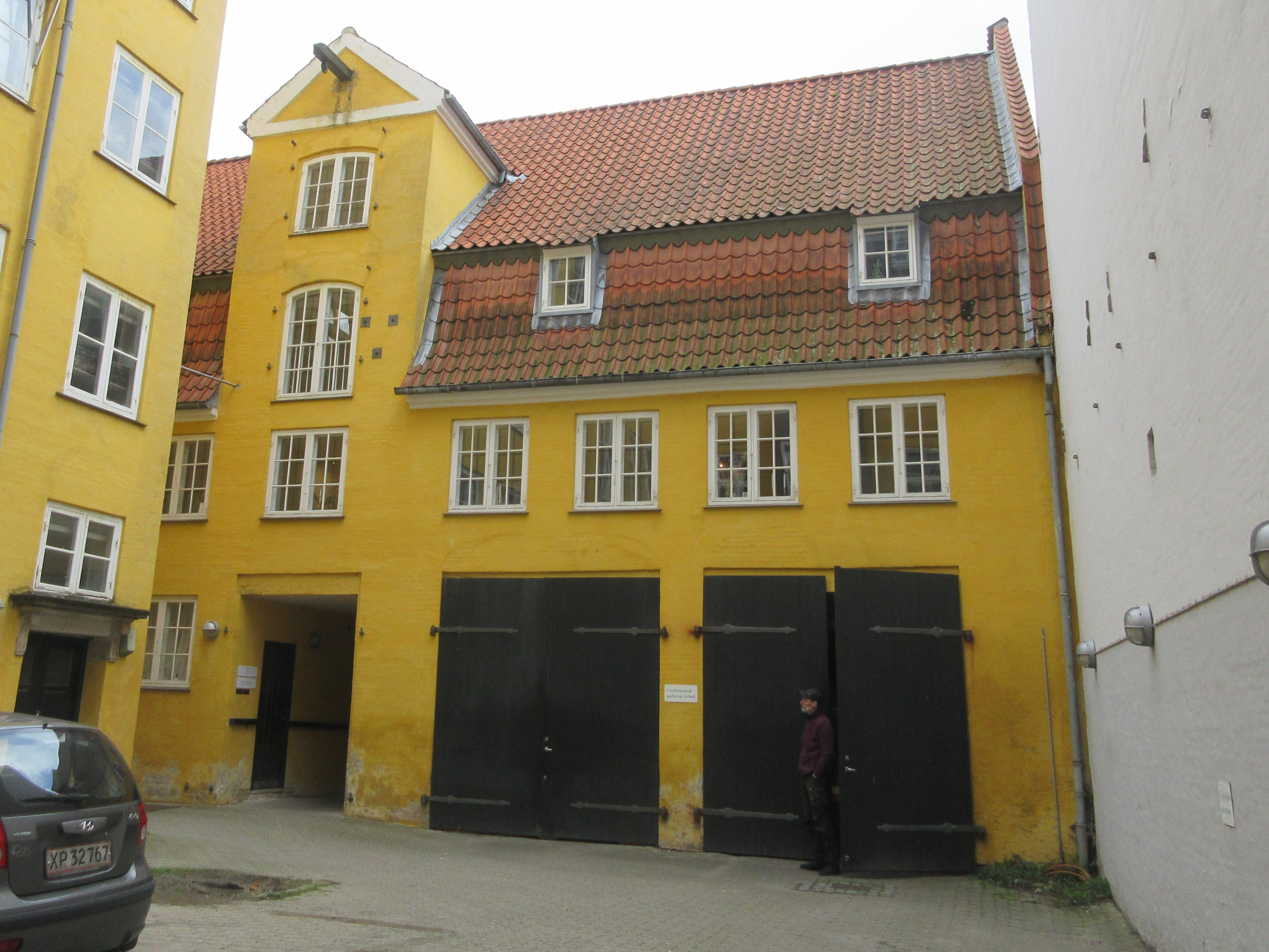
The two-storey rear wing.
