= Hegnslund =

Building in Lyngby-Taarbæk Municipality, Denmark

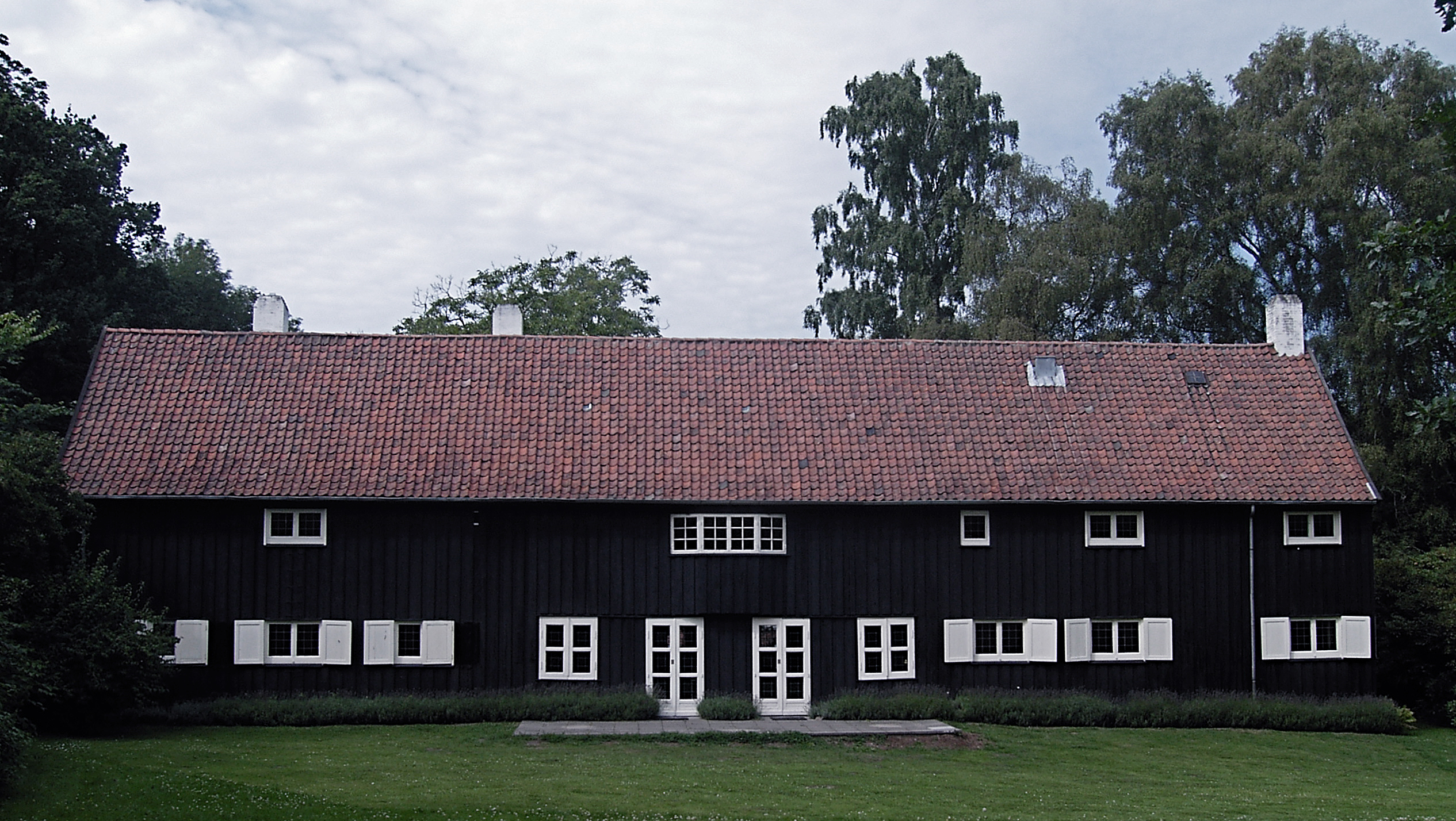
- Hegnslund in 2010
- Interactive map of the Hegnslund area

General information
- Location: Copenhagen, Denmark
- Coordinates: 55°48′16.38″N 12°35′0.46″E
- Completed: 1914
- Renovated: 1915
- Client: Frederik Hegel

Design and construction
- Architect: Henning Hansen

Hegnslund, formerly Tipperary, is the former summer residence of Gyldendal CEO Frederik Hegel at Springforbi, between Taarbæk and Strandmøllen, Lyngby-Taarbæk Municipality, some 15 km north of central Copenhagen, Denmark. The house was built in 1914–15 to a design by Henning Hansen and with interior decorations by Valdemar Andersen. A 1995 revision of the so-called Springforbi Plan from the 1930s listed Hegnslund as one of 12 buildings in the otherwise open green belt not intended for demolition. The house was listed in the Danish registry of protected buildings and places in 2001.

== History ==
=== Oruguns ===
The area was originally owned by Strandmøllen. It was later acquired by lawyer Vagn Aagesen and chamberlain O. C. Scavenius. They established a training ground for racing horses on the site. A long stable was constructed along the southern edge of their property. The stable was later sold to their horse trainer Jens Carlsen. The rest of the property was sold to Fyldendal-owner Frederik Hegel.

=== Hegel family ===
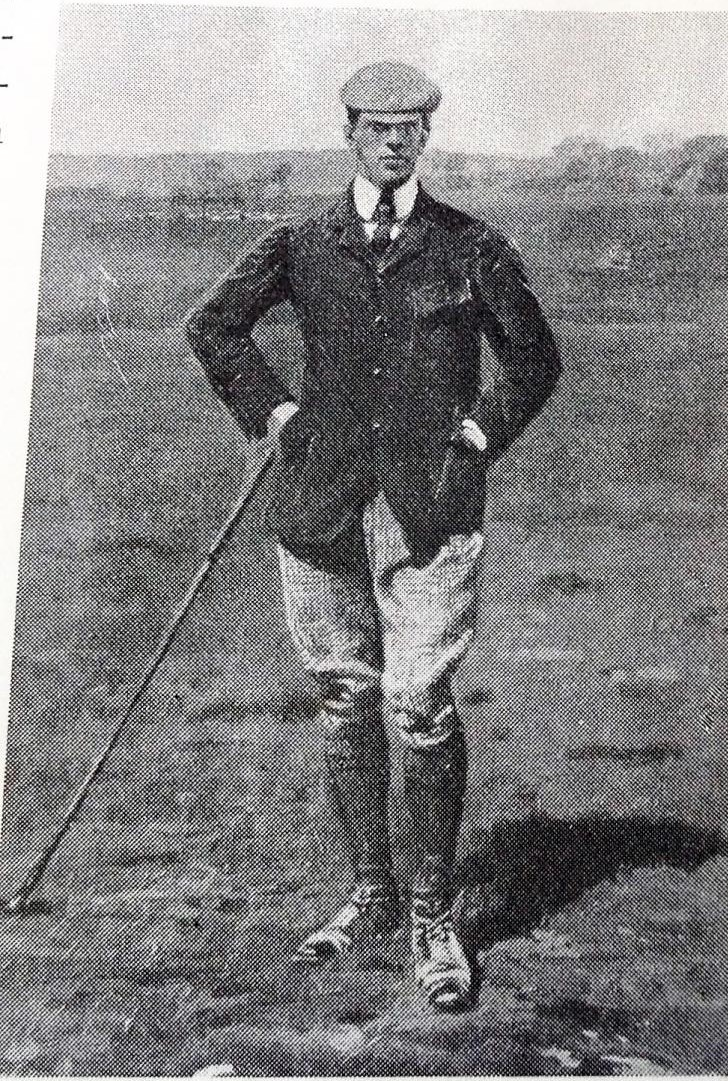
Frederik Hegel

Frederik Hegel was the son of Jacob Hegel and the grandson of Frederik V. Hegel. The family owned the country house Gammel Skovgård in Ordrup. Hegel was at first not particularly interested in joining the family business but assumed the position as CEO of Gyldendal in 1912. In 1914–15. Hegel constructed his own summer residence in Springforbi with the assistance of the architect Henning Hansen. Hegel, whose wife was English/Irish, gave it the name Tipperary. The house was conveniently located close to Copenhagen Golf Club's's new golf course at Jægersborg Dyrehave. Hegel had been an enthusiastic member of the golf club since its foundation in 1898 and won his first Danish championship in 1911.

=== Carl Ejler Ejlers ===
Hegel owned the house until 1939. The next owner was lawyer Carl Ejler Ejlers (1888-1948). He was chairman of FL Smidt and a board member of Nordisk Kabel og Trød, Aalborg Portland and the Danish subsidiaries of the Ford, General Moters and Warner Bros.

=== Later history ===
The so-called Springforbi Plan from the 1930s provided the guidelines for retaining and developing the Springforbi area as a green belt north of Copenhagen. Hegnslund was therefore after Ejlers' death like many other houses in the area acquired by the Danish Forest and Nature Agency. A revision of the Springforbi Plan in 1995 listed Hegnslund as one of 12 of the remaining 20 buildings in the area that were not intended for demolition. It was listed in the Danish registry of protected buildings and places in 2001. The house was for many years rented out as a venue for parties, smaller meetings and other events.

== Architecture ==
The two-storey house has a long, slightly curving rectangular shape. The exterior walls have charred, vertical board siding and relatively small windows with white frames and shutters. The roof was clad with recycled red tiles from a demolished building complex in Studiestræde in Copenhagen.

The interior is divided in two by a hall with double high ceiling in the full depth of the building. The upper part of the walls and ceiling are decorated by Valdemar Andersen. An open gallery provides a connection between the two parts of the house on the first floor.

== Today ==
Hegnslund is as of 1 September 2019 home to a Bichel Vine wine store and show room.

== Cultural references ==
Villa Hegnslund was used as a location for the closing scene of the 1945 film Mens sagføreren sover.
