= Ville Heise =

Danish philanthropist

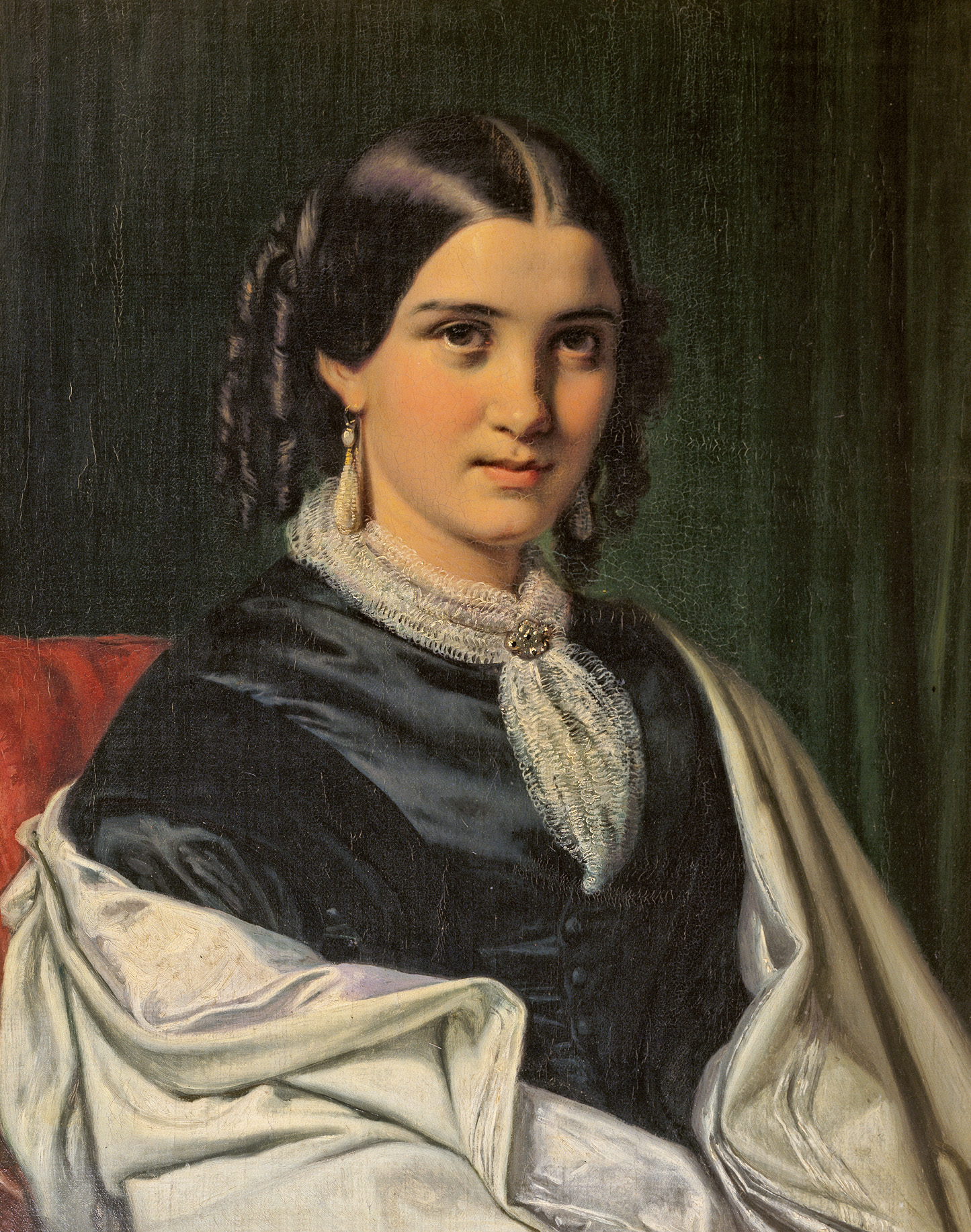
Portrait of Vilhelmine Heise by Wilhelm Marstrand (1856)

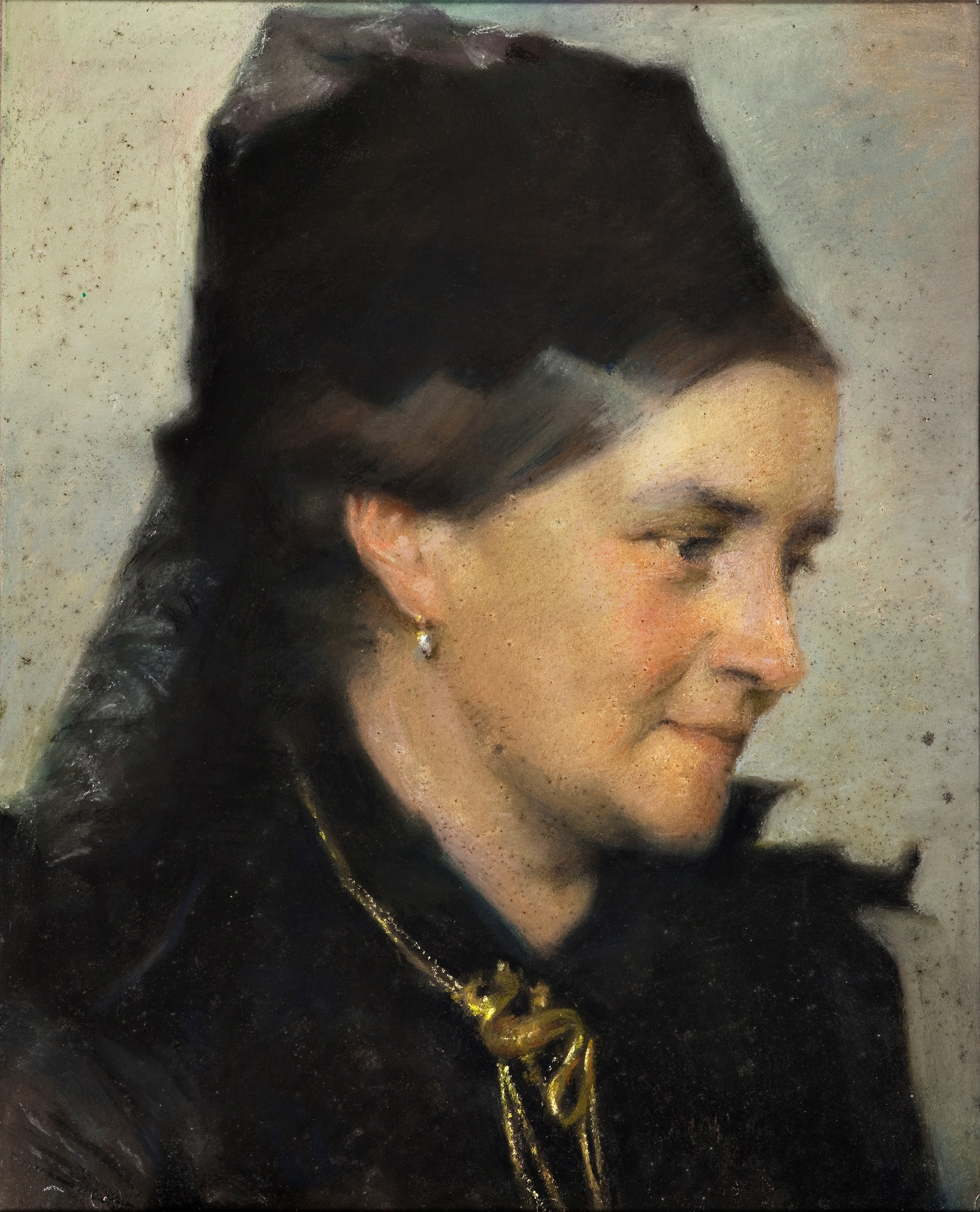
Portrait of Vilhelmine Heise by Frans Schwartz

Vilhelmine (Ville) Heise, also Wilhelmine, née Faber, adopted maiden name Hage, (1838–1912) was a Danish philanthropist who used her inherited fortune to establish sanatoriums at Rydebäck in southern Sweden and at Snekkersten near Helsingør in Denmark. They were initially designed to help children recover from tuberculosis. At Snekkersten, she also established a home for needy officers' widows.

== Biography ==
Born out of wedlock on 8 February 1838 in Kiel, Vilhelmine Faber was the daughter of Frederikke Vilhelmine Faber (1810–1891) and of the merchant and politician Anton Alfred Hage (1803–1872). Her mother having been married before, she was not able to marry Hage until 1840.

Ville Hage was brought up in a luxurious home thanks to the successful business sense of Alfred Hage and his brother-in-law Hans Puggaard who had married Alfred’s sister Bolette. Her parents' grandiose residence, the Harsdorff Mansion on Kongens Nytorv in central Copenhagen, became a meeting place for the capital's political and cultural elite in Denmark's Golden Age. Thanks to her charm, Ville was often the centre of attraction at the parties and celebrations held in her home.

One of the visitors was the composer Peter Arnold Heise (1830–1879). Ville immediately fell in love with him. Despite her father's initial reluctance to accept the marriage, he finally gave in and the two were married on 17 August 1859. The couple moved to Sorø where Heise taught at the music academy. In 1866, they moved back to Copenhagen where thanks to Ville's financial support, he was able to devote himself to composing. He died in 1879, leaving no children. Ville never overcame his death but as a widow of 41, she decided to devote her life to good causes, helping those who were less fortunate than she.

In 1880, encouraged by her brother, the cultural philanthropist Johannes Hage (1842–1923), Ville Heise bought Rydebäck Manor with its estate near Helsingborg in Sweden. She renovated the manor, converting parts of it into a sanatorium for children recovering from tuberculosis as well as for fragile elderly women requiring care. In the 1890s, she bought land in Snekkersten near Helsingør where in the early 1900s she commissioned the architect Hans J. Holm to build three institutions: Damehjemmet for single housemaids, Familielyst for orphaned children and Officersenkehjemmet for the widowed wives of army officers. She also became a keen patron of the arts, employing the painter Frans Schwartz (1850–1917) as her advisor. Schwartz painted portraits of her family and friends.

Heise is also remembered for helping to establish the Housekeeping School (Husflidsskolen) in Kragevig near Præsto in 1872. Designed as a winter leisure centre for boys and girls, in addition to household chores it provided training in crafts such as furniture making. The school received a number of awards until it closed in 1914.

Although she never publicize her philanthropic works, in 1905 she was awarded the Golden Medal of Merit. She died in Copenhagen on 16 April 1912.
