= Ny Kongensgade 6 =

Building in Copenhagen, Denmark

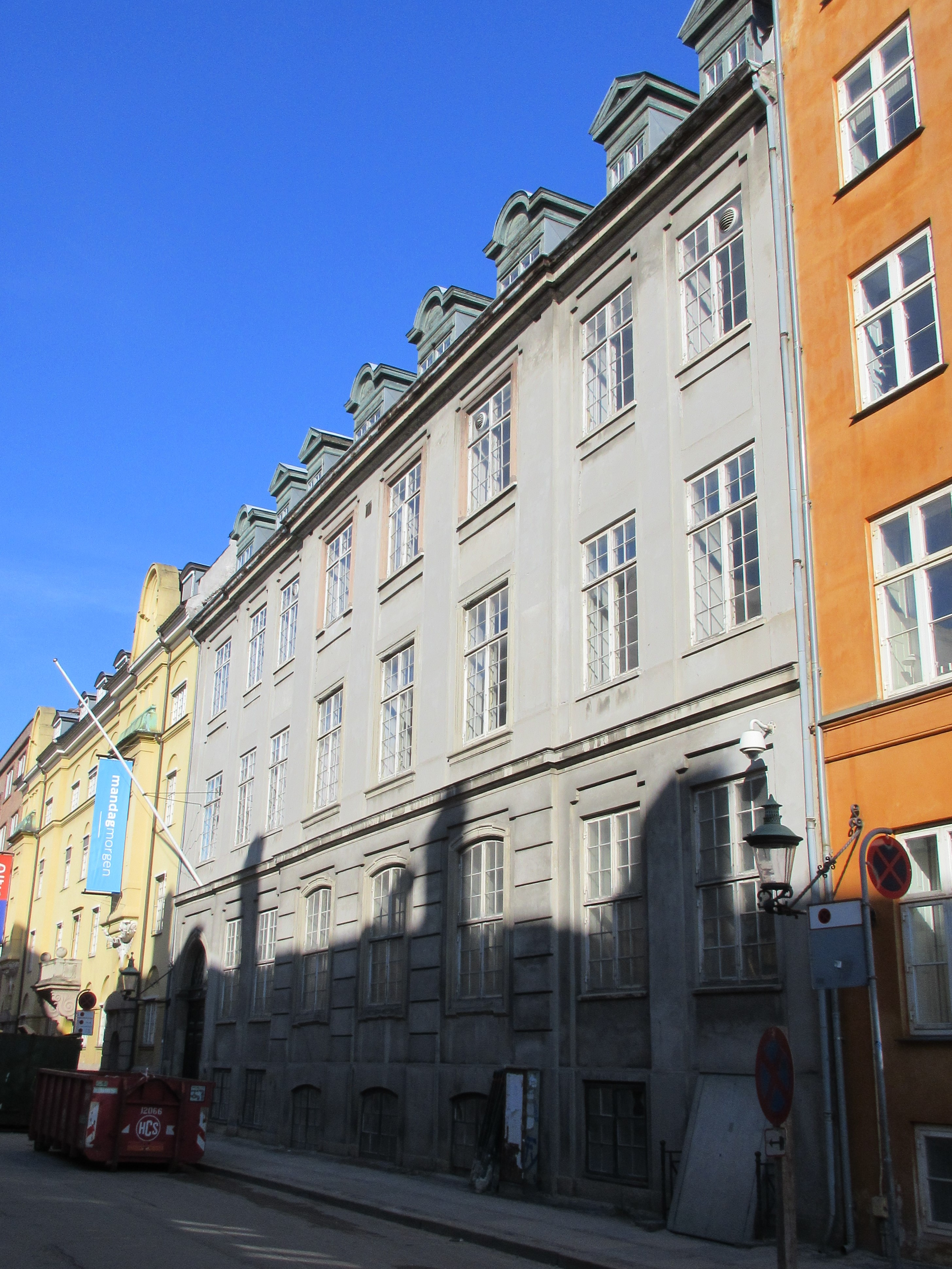
- =
- Interactive map of the Ny Kongensgade 6 area

General information
- Location: Copenhagen, Denmark
- Coordinates: 55°40′26.45″N 12°34′36.16″E
- Completed: 1754

Ny Kongensgade 6 is a rococo-style property located at Ny Kongensgade 6 in central Copenhagen, Denmark. It was listed in the Danish registry of protected buildings and places in 1918. Notable former residents include the politician Christian Colbjørnsen, businessman Alfred Hage, politician Orla Lehmann, landowner Michael Treschow (1814–1901) and tobacco manufacturer Emilius Nobel.

== History ==
=== 17th and 18th centuries ===
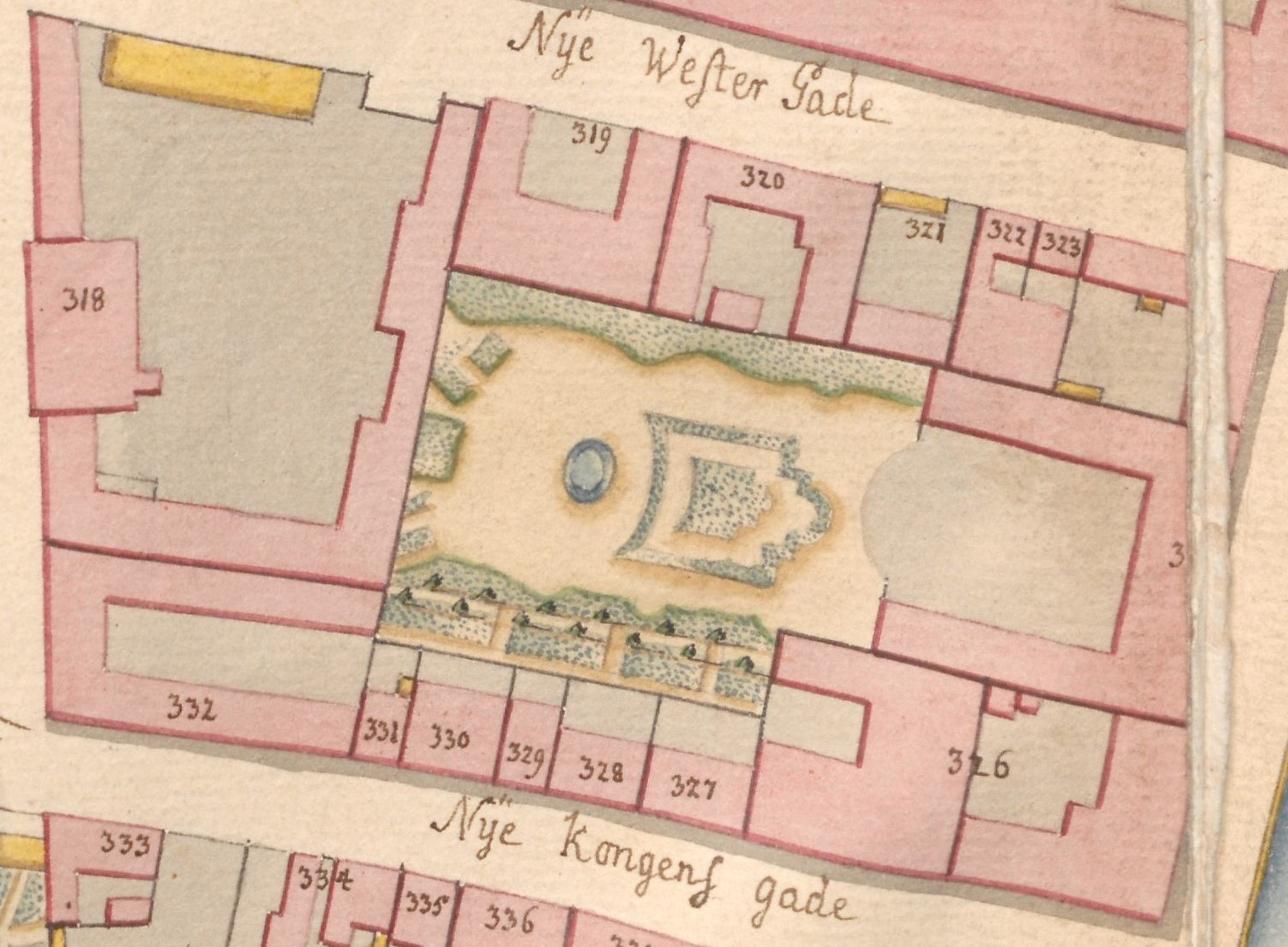
No. 282, seen in a detail from Christian Gedde's map of Copenhagen's West Quarter, 1757

The site was originally part of a large property at the corner of Frederiksholms Kanal. It was listed in Copenhagen's first cadastre of 1689 as No. 186 in the city's West Quarter (Vester Kvarter) and belonged to one Johan Jørgen at that time.

The property was later acquired by Johan Frederik Friis (1691–1767). The present building on the site was constructed for him in 1754. His property was listed in the new cadastre of 1756 asNo. 326 in the West Quarter. The property now known as Ny Kongensgade 6 was later referred to as No. 326 B.

The politician Christian Colbjørnsen resided in the building from 1795 to 1809.

=== 19th century ===
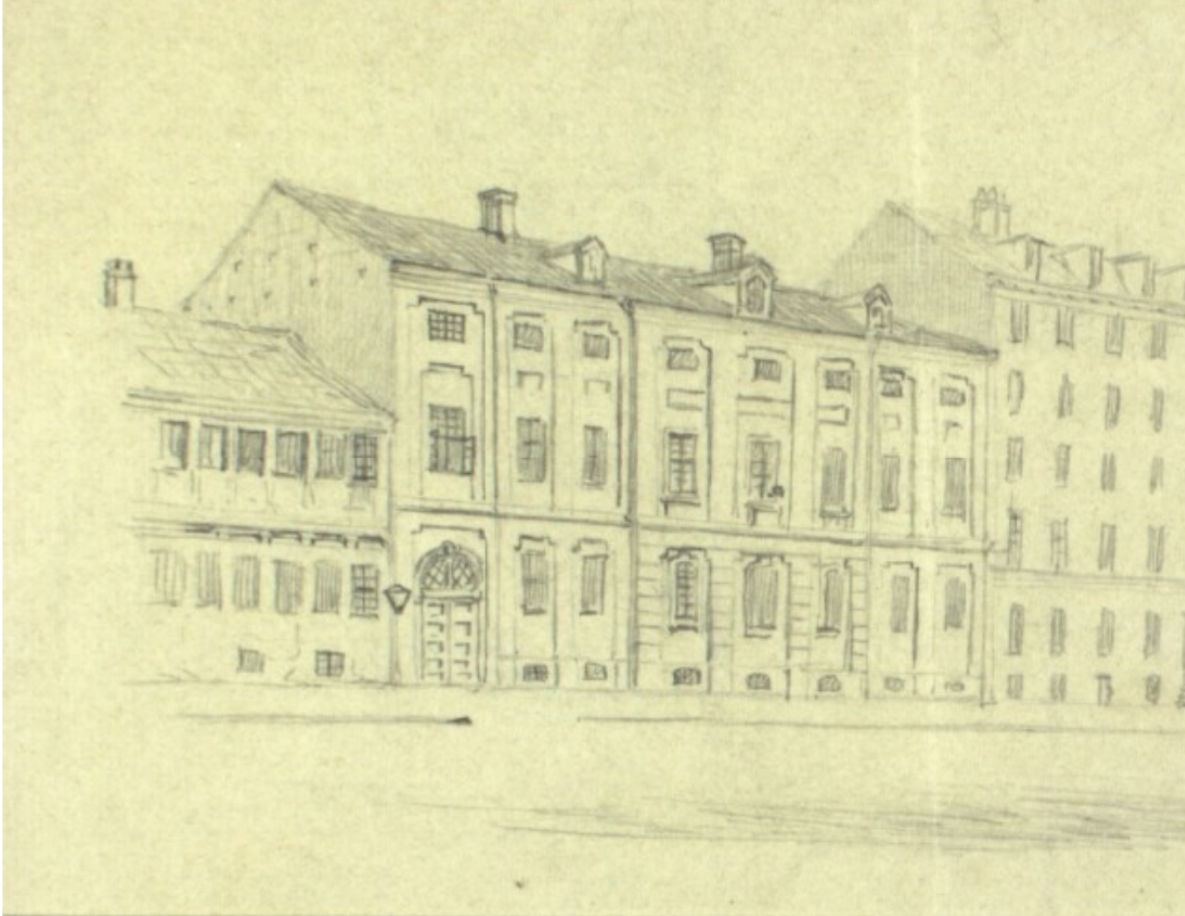
Drawing of the building from before 1902

The property was listed in the new cadastre of 1806 as No. 221 in the West Quarter. It was owned by Mariboe at that time. The property was later owned by the Jewish congregation.

In circa 183, it was acquired by the businessman (grosserer) Johann Friederich Erichsen.

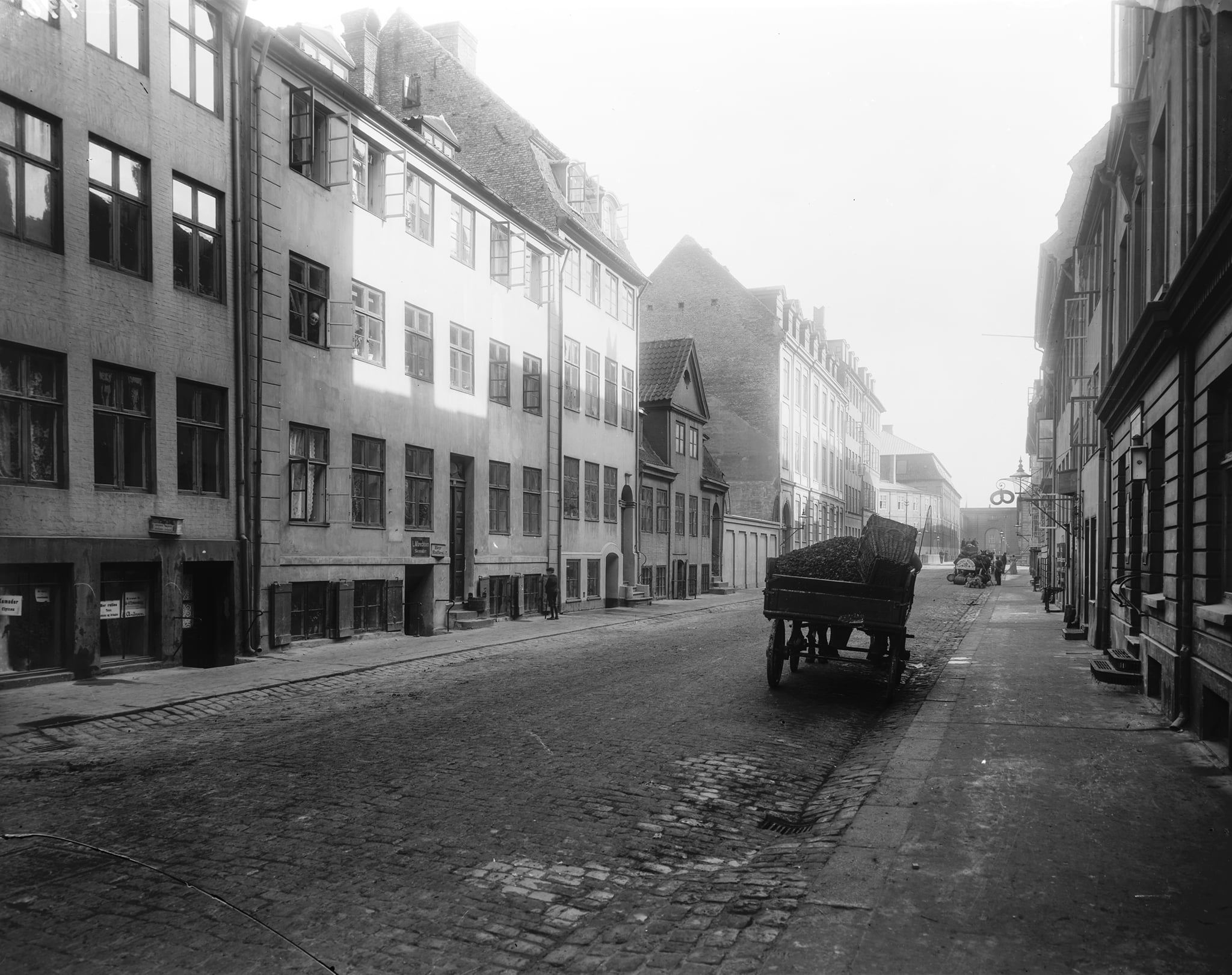
Ny Kongensgade 6

The industrialist Hans Peter Frederiksen (1810–1891) was a resident of the building in 1842. Johannes Ephraim Larsen (1799–1856), a professor of jurisprudence at the University of Copenhagen, resided in the building from 1842 to 1845. The merchant and politician Alfred Hage resided in the building in 1859–1860. The politician Orla Lehmann, who was married to the daughter of Alfred Hage's sister, Bolette Puggaard, had his last home in the building and died there on 13 September 1870.

The building belonged to Michael Treschow (1814–1901) at the time of the 1880 census. He was also the owner of Fritzøehus in Norway. He lived there with his wife Frederike Treschov (née Brøndsted), three daughters (aged 23 to 34) and one maid. The only other residents of the building at that time were the concierge Carl Meyer, his wife Pouline Meyer and their nine-year-old son Carl Meyer.

The building was later purchased by Emileus Ferdinand Nobel, owner of the E. Nobel robacco company. He resided on the ground as a widower with his daughters Caroline and Ingebrog (aged 36 and 26), his niece Laura Antonia Nobel, 42-year-old Marie Sophie Elise Marckmann, a female cook, one male servant and one maid.

=== 20th century ===
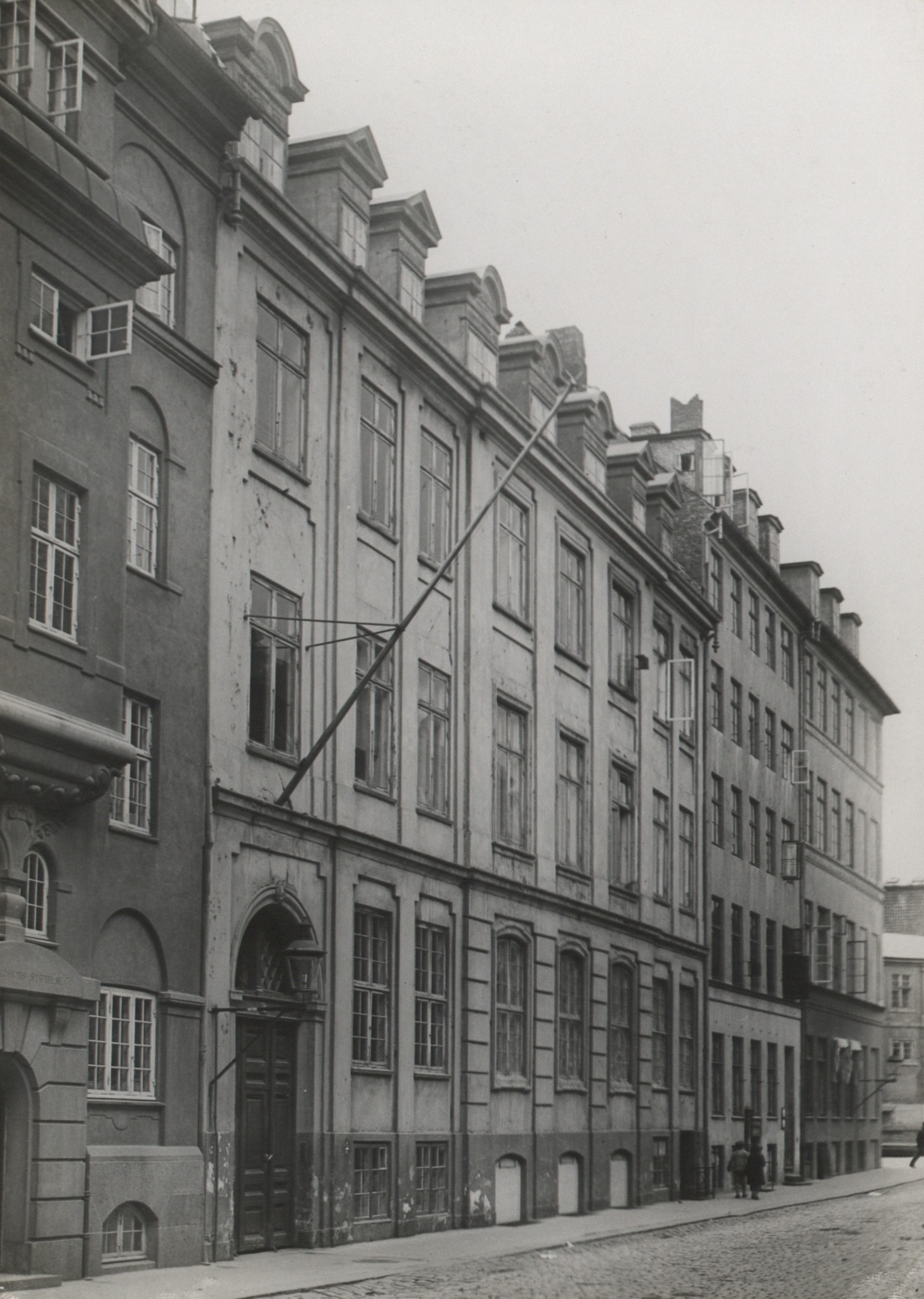
Ny Kongensgade 6

The city's Jewish Religious Community (Det mosaiske Troessamfund) acquired the building in 1902 and converted it into the first Danish-Jewish museum. In 1962–1968, it was restored and adapted for use as a cultural centre and youth center.

The businessman Julius Goldschmidt was a resident of the building in 1919.
