= Alfred Hage =

Danish merchant, politician, landowner, patron of the arts and philanthropist

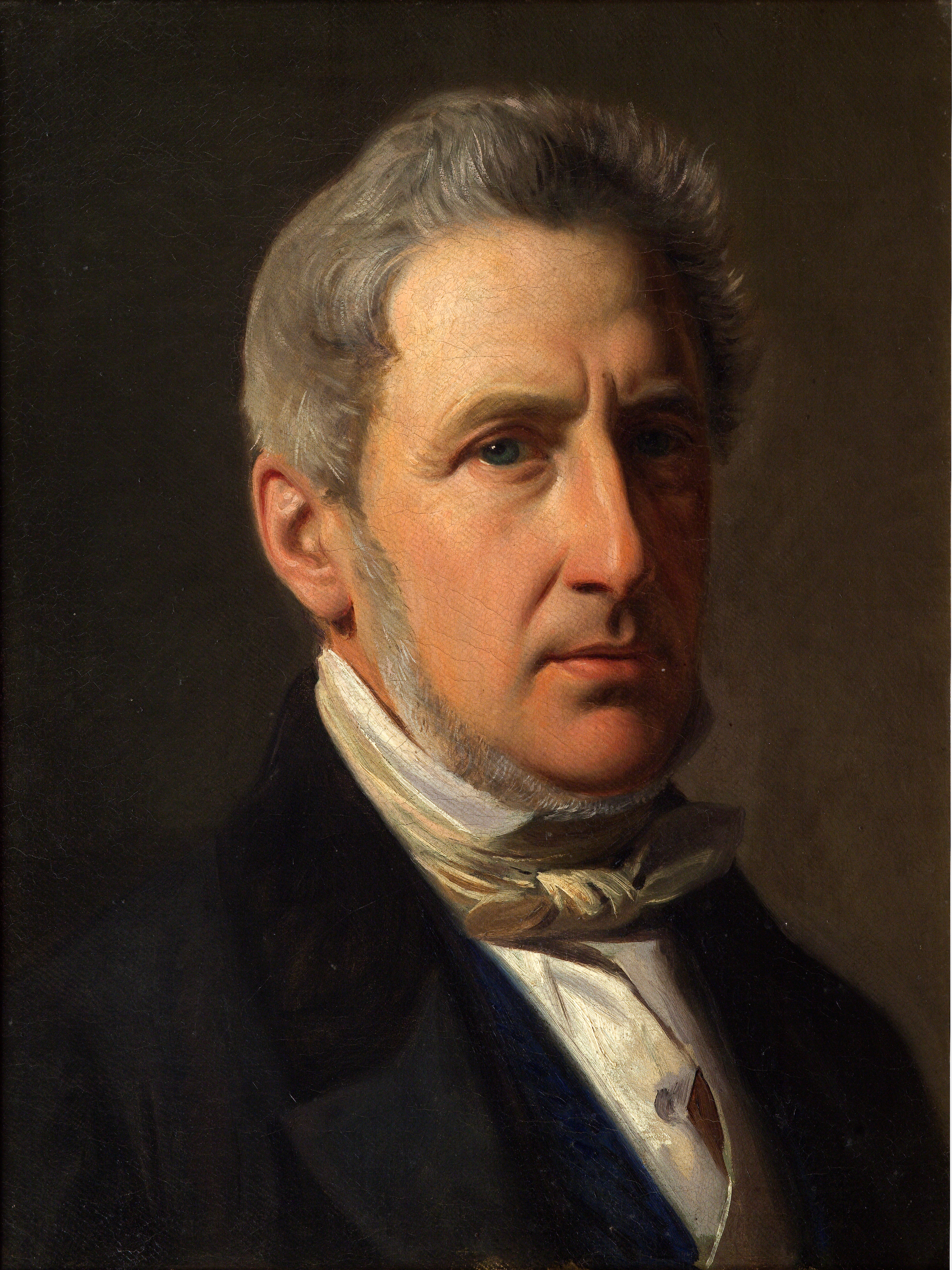
- Alfred Hage painted by Constantin Hansen in c. 1856
- Born: 31 December 1803; Stege, Denmark
- Died: 6 March 1872 (aged 68); Copenhagen, Denmark
- Occupations: Merchant and landowner

Peter Anton Alfred Hage (31 December 1803 – 6 March 1872) was a Danish merchant, politician, landowner, patron of the arts and philanthropist.

== Early life and education ==
Hage was born in Stege on the island of Møn, the son of merchant Christopher Friedenreich Hage and Christiane Arnette Hage née Just (1778–1866). The Hage family was of Dutch origins and had counted merchants at least since the 17th century. Hage was the brother of Hother Hage and Johannes Dam Hage (1800–1837).

Intended for an academic career, he stayed in the household of pastor D. P. Smith in Horslunde as part of the preparations for his further studies.

== Career ==
Hage was, however, more interested in following in his father's footsteps and therefore joined his company at the age of 16. He showed a remarkable talent for the trade and already became a partner in 1828. When Hans Puggaard, who was married to Hage's elder sister Bolette, opened a branch in Nakskov in 1862, he employed Hage as its manager. Under Hage's leadership, the company ended up completely dominating the export of grain from the island of Lolland. He also contributed to significantly improving the quality by personally guiding landowners and promoting the best varieties on local exhibitions.

In 1841 Hage moved to Copenhagen with his family after Puggaard had invited him to become a partner in the company. Hage contributed to increasing the export of grain to England and also established a large-scale import of colonial goods. The company owned a large fleet of merchant ships. Hage became one of the most successful merchants of his day but remained an outsider for the business community in Copenhagen.

== Property ==
Hage lived at Kronprinsessegade 20 from 1843 to 1848. He then lived in a now demolished building at Torvegade until 1858, whereafter he moved for a few years first to Ny Kongensgade 6 (1859–1860) and then Bredgade 45 (1861) before taking over the Harsdorff House on Kongens Nytorv where he lived for the rest of his life 1862–1872). In 1849, he bought Stokkerup in Taarbæk north of Copenhagen.

In 1859, Hage purchased Nivaagaard and several other farms at Nivå in North Zealand. He purchased Oremandsgaard near Præstø in 1861. He was also the owner of several estates in Sweden.

== Personal life ==
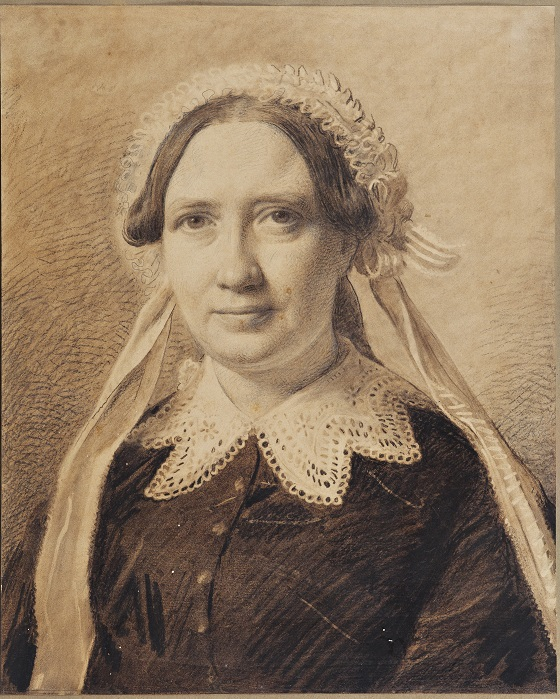
Frederikke Vilhelmine Hage painted by Constantin Hansen in 1836

Hage married Frederikke Vilhelmine Faber (18 February 1810 — 23 December 1891) on 28 August 1840 in Stege Church. He was the father of Johannes Hage (1842–1923), who founded the museum of Nivaagaard, and Alfred Hage (1843–1922).

Hage was interested in the arts. His homes in Copenhagen and in Stokkerup on the Øresund coast were frequented by writers, artists, politicians and actors. His daughters (of which Johanne and Frederikke Elisabeth were adopted from his wife's first marriage) were all married to prominent cultural figures. Composer Peter Heise married Hage's daughter Ville, sculptor Vilhelm Bissen married Johanne (Hanne) and poet and politician Carl Ploug married Frederikke Elisabeth.

Hage commissioned Constantin Hansen's painting of The Danish Constituent Assembly. It hung in his home until his widow donated it to the Danish state.

Hage died on 5 March. He is buried at Holmens Cemetery in Copenhagen.

== Politics ==
Hage's niece, Maria Puggaard, was married to Orla Lehmann; his brother Hother Hage introduced him to other National Liberal leaders. Hage made his homes available to political salons and hosted confidential meetings between leading politicians of the time. He ran as a candidate at a supplementary election in 1851 but was not elected. He was elected to the Danish parliament in Copenhagen from 1852 to 1866 and then in Roskilde from 1868 until his death. He was involved with the work for a constitution for both Denmark and Schlesvig-Holstein in 1855 and the November Constitution in 1864.
