= Listed buildings in Lyngby-Taarbæk Municipality =

This is a list of listed buildings in Lyngby-Taarbæk Municipality, Denmark.

== Listed buildings ==
=== 2800 Kongens Lyngby ===
Listing name	Image	Location	Coordinates	Description
Brede 33-77		Brede 33, 2800 Kongens Lyngby	55°47′39.17″N 12°29′53.69″E	Former industrial complex.
Brede 33-77		Brede 52, 2800 Kongens Lyngby	55°47′37.13″N 12°29′53.8″E	
Brede 33-77		Brede 60, 2800 Kongens Lyngby	55°47′35.77″N 12°29′53.75″E	
Brede 33-77		Brede 62, 2800 Kongens Lyngby	55°47′34.68″N 12°29′53.44″E	
Brede 33-77		Brede 64, 2800 Kongens Lyngby	55°47′33.78″N 12°29′53.76″E	
Brede 33-77		Brede 70, 2800 Kongens Lyngby	55°47′37.8″N 12°29′54.63″E	
Brede 33-77		Brede 75, 2800 Kongens Lyngby	55°47′37.81″N 12°29′56.41″E	
Brede Allé		Brede 66, 2800 Kongens Lyngby	55°47′26.14″N 12°29′57.49″E	Residential buildings. Protected 1991.
Brede Allé		Brede 69, 2800 Kongens Lyngby	55°47′24.29″N 12°29′56.78″E	Built 1893, rebuilt 1957.
Brede Allé 68		Brede 68, 2800 Kongens Lyngby	55°47′24.04″N 12°29′54.17″E	Built 1922.
Brede Asyl		Brede 81, 2800 Kongens Lyngby	55°47′40.01″N 12°29′51″E	Daycare. Built 1905, rebuilt 1958.
Brede Water Tower; Brede Vandtårn		Mølleåparken 40, 2800 Kongens Lyngby	55°47′38.84″N 12°30′6.03″E	Water tower from 1907. Protected 1991.
Brede Textile Manufactury		Brede Hovedbygning 1, 2800 Kongens Lyngby	55°47′39.72″N 12°29′55.17″E	18th century industrial complex. 16 buildings are protected.
Bøgely		Raadvad 2, 2800 Kongens Lyngby	55°48′14.67″N 12°33′40.29″E	South and west wings. Built 1843. Protected 2004.
Bøgely		Raadvad 2A, 2800 Kongens Lyngby	55°48′14.87″N 12°33′41.24″E	North wing and associated buildings.
Christianelyst		Nybrovej 393, 2800 Kongens Lyngby	55°46′32.06″N 12°27′41.67″E	Main building and associated buildings. From ca. 1800. Protected 1960.
Christianelyst		Nybrovej 395, 2800 Kongens Lyngby	55°46′31.58″N 12°27′40.51″E	
Gramlille		Lyngby Hovedgade 28, 2800 Kongens Lyngby	55°46′23.86″N 12°29′56.35″E	House from ca. 1800. Protected 1950.
Hermitage Hunting Lodge; Eremitageslottet		Dyrehaven 4, 2800 Kongens Lyngby	55°47′42.79″N 12°34′17.31″E	Royal hunting lodge designed by Lauritz de Thurah. Protected 1918.
Friboes Hvile		Lyngby Hovedgade 2A, 2800 Kongens Lyngby	55°46′35.32″N 12°29′44.78″E	Protected 1918.
Fuglevad Watermill		Møllevej 4, 2800 Kongens Lyngby	55°47′5″N 12°29′47.45″E	Protected 1964.
Fuglevad Windmill		Kongevejen 102, 2800 Kongens Lyngby	55°47′11.11″N 12°29′21.9″E	Windmill from 1814. Protected 1964.
Louisekilde		Nybrovej 423, 2800 Kongens Lyngby	55°46′46.21″N 12°26′48.45″E	Memorial of Christiana Louise Warnstedt. Protected 1918.
Lyngby Northern Mill; Lyngby Nordre Mølle		Lyngby Hovedgade 24A, 2800 Kongens Lyngby	55°46′26.39″N 12°29′54.11″E	Protected 1972.
Lyngby former Rectory; Lyngby tidligere Præstegård		Lyngby Kirkestræde 12, 2800 Kongens Lyngby	55°46′27.36″N 12°30′5.45″E	Built 1846 with extension from 1914. Protected 1979.
Lyngby former Rectory; Lyngby tidligere Præstegård		Lyngby Kirkestræde 12, 2800 Kongens Lyngby	55°46′28.26″N 12°30′5.56″E	
Lyngby Southern Mill; Lyngby Søndre Mølle		Lyngby Hovedgade 24, 2800 Kongens Lyngby	55°46′25.68″N 12°29′55.99″E	Built 1903 by Valdemar and Bernhard Ingemann. Protected 2012.
Lyngby Town Hall; Lyngby Rådhus		Lyngby Torv 17, 2800 Kongens Lyngby	55°46′10.58″N 12°30′11.4″E	Protected 2014.
Lystoftegård		Lystoftevej 17, 2800 Kongens Lyngby	55°47′37.99″N 12°30′37.97″E	Main building. Protected 1994.
Lystoftevej 80		Lystoftevej 80, 2800 Kongens Lyngby	55°47′40.13″N 12°30′3.63″E	Protected 1990.
Marienborg		Nybrovej 410, 2800 Kongens Lyngby	55°46′31.31″N 12°27′53.63″E	Protected 1964.
Møllevej 5		Møllevej 5, 2800 Kongens Lyngby	55°47′5.54″N 12°29′43.64″E	Protected 1991.
Møllevej 10A-B		Møllevej 10A, 2800 Kongens Lyngby	55°47′6.13″N 12°29′44.73″E	Former nursery home for children. Protected 1991.
Nybrovej 116		Nybrovej 116, 2800 Kongens Lyngby	55°45′38.13″N 12°30′0.14″E	Protected 2015.
Raadvad 3-30		Raadvad 3, 2800 Kongens Lyngby	55°48′16.34″N 12°33′32.84″E	Protected 1983.
Raadvad 3-30		Raadvad 4, 2800 Kongens Lyngby	55°48′14.58″N 12°33′38.42″E	Residential building from 1918.
Raadvad 3-30		Raadvad 6, 2800 Kongens Lyngby	55°48′15.73″N 12°33′38.48″E	Residential building from 1918.
Raadvad 3-30		Raadvad 7, 2800 Kongens Lyngby	55°48′17.27″N 12°33′32.68″E	Residential building from 1918.
Raadvad 3-30		Raadvad 8, 2800 Kongens Lyngby	55°48′15.81″N 12°33′37.24″E	Residential building from 1918.
Raadvad 3-30		Raadvad 10, 2800 Kongens Lyngby	55°48′14.87″N 12°33′37.24″E	Residential building from 1918.
Raadvad 3-30		Raadvad 11, 2800 Kongens Lyngby	55°48′17.12″N 12°33′30.62″E	Built 1802.
Raadvad 3-30		Raadvad 12, 2800 Kongens Lyngby	55°48′14.97″N 12°33′35.64″E	Workshop, nicknamed "Fileværket". With outhouse. Built 1779.
Raadvad 3-30		Raadvad 13, 2800 Kongens Lyngby	55°48′17.66″N 12°33′31.27″E	
Raadvad 3-30		Raadvad 17, 2800 Kongens Lyngby	55°48′18.08″N 12°33′29.46″E	Former blacksmith.
Raadvad 3-30		Raadvad 22, 2800 Kongens Lyngby	55°48′15.96″N 12°33′35.7″E	
Raadvad 3-30		Raadvad 24, 2800 Kongens Lyngby	55°48′16.39″N 12°33′35.87″E	Residential building from 1828.
Raadvad 3-30		Raadvad 26, 2800 Kongens Lyngby	55°48′17.59″N 12°33′34.91″E	Residential building from 1779.
Raadvad 3-30		Raadvad 30, 2800 Kongens Lyngby	55°48′18.6″N 12°33′34.23″E	
Raadvad 40-44		Raadvad 40, 2800 Kongens Lyngby	55°48′20.22″N 12°33′34.4″E	Protected 1983.
Raadvad 40-44		Raadvad 42, 2800 Kongens Lyngby	55°48′19.5″N 12°33′37.07″E	
Raadvad 40-44		Raadvad 44, 2800 Kongens Lyngby	55°48′19.83″N 12°33′36.08″E	Built 1961.
Raadvad Hostel; Raadvad Vandrehjem		Raadvad 1, 2800 Kongens Lyngby	55°48′12.55″N 12°33′31.16″E	Former school building. Protected 1983.
Sophienholm		Nybrovej 401, 2800 Kongens Lyngby	55°46′31.34″N 12°27′27.38″E	Main building. From 1796–1803 by Joseph-Jacques Ramée. Protected 1918.
Sorgenfri Palace		Kongevejen 2, 2800 Kongens Lyngby	55°46′43.52″N 12°29′49.52″E	Main building and associated buildings. Built 1756 by Lauritz de Thurah. Protected 1918.
Sorgenfri Palace		Kongevejen 2A, 2800 Kongens Lyngby	55°46′42.17″N 12°29′47.89″E	Southern building, nicknamed "Damebygningen".
Sorgenfri Palace		Kongevejen 4A, 2800 Kongens Lyngby	55°46′46.39″N 12°29′37.62″E	Residential wing.
Sorgenfri Palace		Kongevejen 6, 2800 Kongens Lyngby	55°46′32.27″N 12°29′53.07″E	
Sorgenfri Palace		Schallsvej 16, 2800 Kongens Lyngby	55°46′40.51″N 12°30′1.91″E	Music house.
Sorgenfridal		Lyngby Hovedgade 6, 2800 Kongens Lyngby	55°46′31.8″N 12°29′48.13″E	Protected 1987.
Støvlet Kathrine's House; Støvlet Katrines Hus		Gammel Lundtoftevej 31, 2800 Kongens Lyngby	55°46′39.58″N 12°30′21.21″E	House from 1808. Protected 1979.
White Mansion, Moyel House; Det Hvide Palæ, Moyels Gård		Lyngby Hovedgade 37, 2800 Kongens Lyngby	55°46′15.75″N 12°30′11.3″E	Main building and side wing from ca. 1806. Protected 1918.
Ørholm		Ørholmvej 61, 2800 Kongens Lyngby	55°47′59.25″N 12°30′17.52″E	Main building. Built in the 1700s. Protected 1918.

=== 2830 Virum ===
Listing name	Image	Location	Coordinates	Description
Frederiksdal House		Hummeltoftevej 187, 2830 Virum	55°46′57.06″N 12°27′3.14″E	Protected 1918. Built 1744.
Frederiksdal House		Hummeltoftevej 185, 2830 Virum	55°46′57.39″N 12°27′5.65″E	Built 1880.
Frederiksdal House		Hummeltoftevej 189, 2830 Virum	55°46′58.47″N 12°27′2.78″E	Built 1880.
Frederiksdal House		Frederiksdalsvej 351, 2800 Kongens Lyngby	55°46′53.09″N 12°26′53.91″E	Gardener's house. Built 1740.
I.H. Mundtsvej 4B		I.H.Mundts Vej 4B, 2830 Virum	55°46′45.94″N 12°28′56.52″E	Villa built 1957 by Arne Jacobsen. Protected 1999.
I.H. Mundtsvej 16		I.H.Mundts Vej 16, 2830 Virum	55°46′47.59″N 12°29′5.29″E	Village and garage built 1924 by Ferdinand Heiberg. Protected 1987.
Spurveskjul		Spurveskjul 4, 2830 Virum	55°46′59.46″N 12°27′28.62″E	Protected 1924.
Spurveskjul		Spurveskjul 6, 2830 Virum	55°46′59.21″N 12°27′27.09″E	

=== 2930 Klampenborg ===
Listing name	Image	Location	Coordinates	Description
Bellevue Beach; Bellevue Strandbad		Taarbæk Strandvej 14A, 2930 Klampenborg	55°46′48.35″N 12°35′33.62″E	Protected 2001.
Cottageparken		Strandvejen 550, 2930 Klampenborg	55°46′58.66″N 12°35′26.67″E	"The Red Cottage". Protected 1979.
Cottageparken		Taarbæk Strandvej 2, 2930 Klampenborg	55°46′46.64″N 12°35′25.12″E	"The Yellow Cottage". Protected 1978.
Hegnslund		Strandvejen 859, 2930 Klampenborg	55°48′16.23″N 12°35′0.32″E	Built 1914–1915 by Henning Hansen and Valdemar Andersen. Protected 2001.
Kildeøen, Kirsten Piils Kilde		Dyrehaven 7, 2930 Klampenborg	55°46′37.36″N 12°34′14.89″E	Built 1924. Restaurant founded 1927 by Ivar Bentsen. Protected 1991.
Måneporten		Kandscape feature from 1934 by C. Th. Sørensen.		
Tårbæk Strandvej 82		Taarbæk Strandvej 82, 2930 Klampenborg	55°47′8.59″N 12°35′38.04″E	Protected 1979.
