= Valdemar Andersen (artist) =

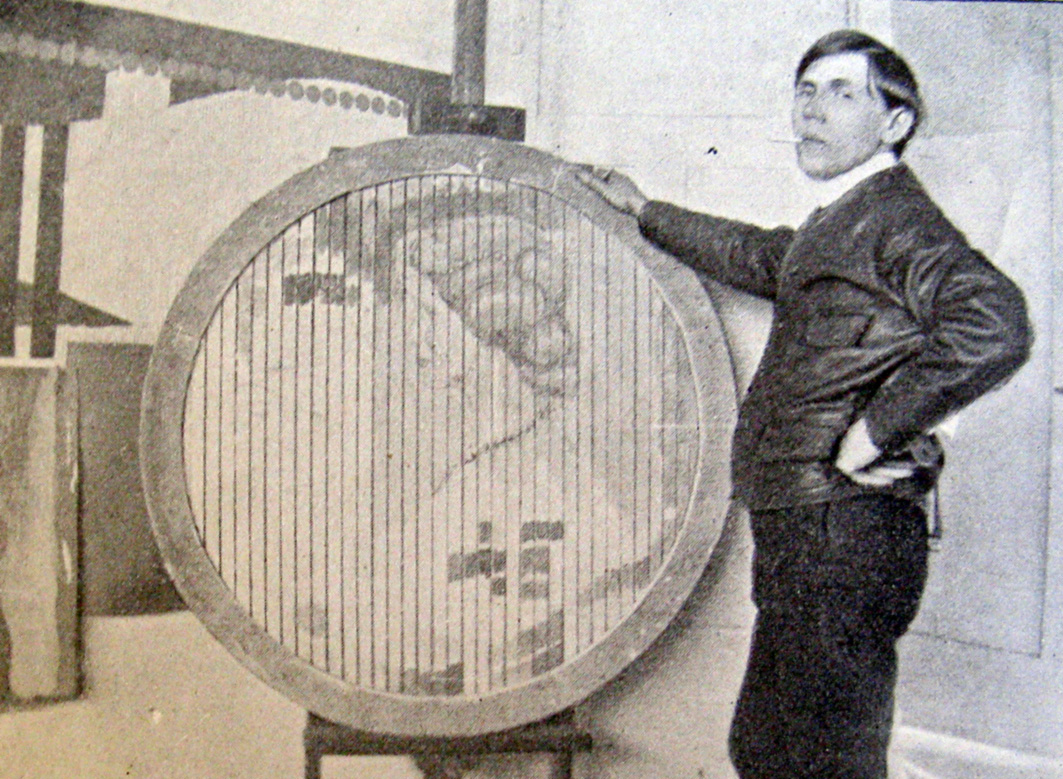
- Born: Valdemar Andersen; February 3, 1875; Copenhagen, Denmark
- Died: July 5, 1928 (aged 53); Copenhagen, Denmark
- Known for: Posters, illustrations

Valdemar Andersen (3 February 1875 – 15 July 1928 in Copenhagen) was a Danish painter, illustrator, graphic designer and decorative artist. He is today best known as a poster artist.

In the 1900s, he was influenced by Art Nouveau. He later developed a simple, clean and personal style which combined advertisement with a more artistic expression.

== Early life ==
Valdemar Andersen was born into a working-class family in Copenhagen in 1875. He apprenticed as a painter with C. C. Møllmann from 1891. He also attended Copenhagen Technical School (H. Grønvold) and studied one semester at the Royal Danish Academy of Fine Arts in autumn 1894.

== Illustrations, posters and stamps ==
Andersen began his career as illustrator by drawing portraits for a stereotype workshop working for provincial newspapers. He was associated with the magazine Klokken 12 from its foundation in 1902, creating its daily poster. He soon began to receive commissions from Ernst Bojesen at Gyldendalske Boghandel (Nordisk Forlag), culminating with the illustration of Carit Etlar's works (1905–06) and Feltlægens Historier by Zacharias Topelius (1906–08).

He also worked for magazines such as Klods-Hans, Blæksprutten, Politikens Magasin and Berlingske Tidende Sunday.

He illustrated numerous books in the 1920s and also created book covers.

He also created posters, post cards and stamps. He designed the annual Danish Christmas seal in 1914.

== Paintings ==
Andersen had his debut as a painter at Charlottenborg's spring exhibition in 1906 with a portrait of Johannes V. Jensen. He was also represented at Charlottenborg's Spring Exhibition in 1908 and 1914 and at its Autumn Exhibition in 1914. His works as a painter include portraits of Henrik Cavling, Ludvig Kraft, Peter Nansen and Henri Nathansen.

== Decorative works ==
As a decorative artist, Andersen collaborated with Anton Rosen, working on projects such as the Metropol Building in Copenhagen (1906–07), the Danish National Exhibition of 1909 in Aarhus and Palace Hotel (vestibule, 1910). He has also created decorative works for many of Ejnar Packness' buildings in Jutland, including Aalborg Municipality's administration building in 1912. He has also created decorative works for the interior of Politiken's headquarters at the City Hall Square in Copenhagen.

== Gallery ==
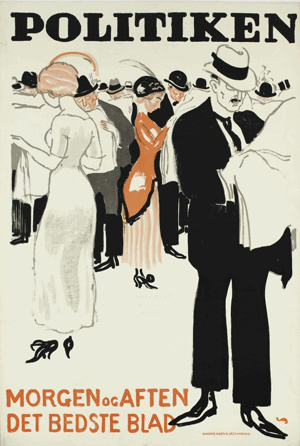
Politiken (10+4)

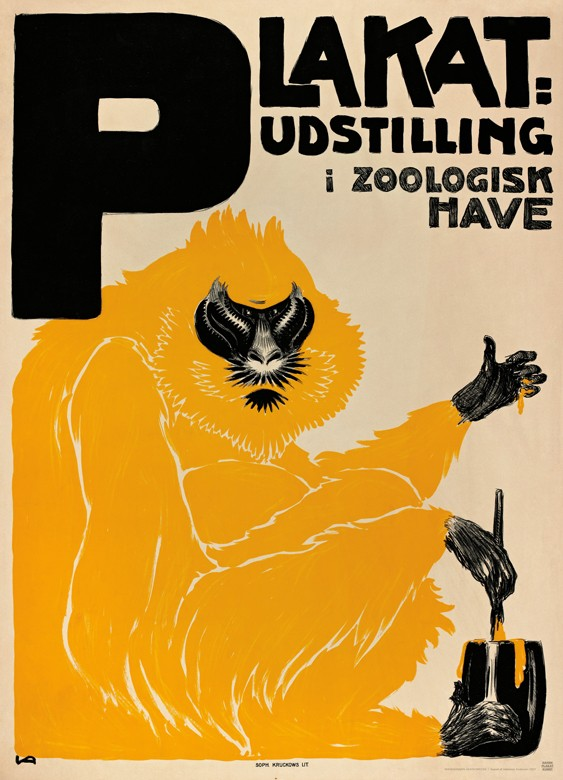
Poster exhibition in Copenhagen Zoo (1907)

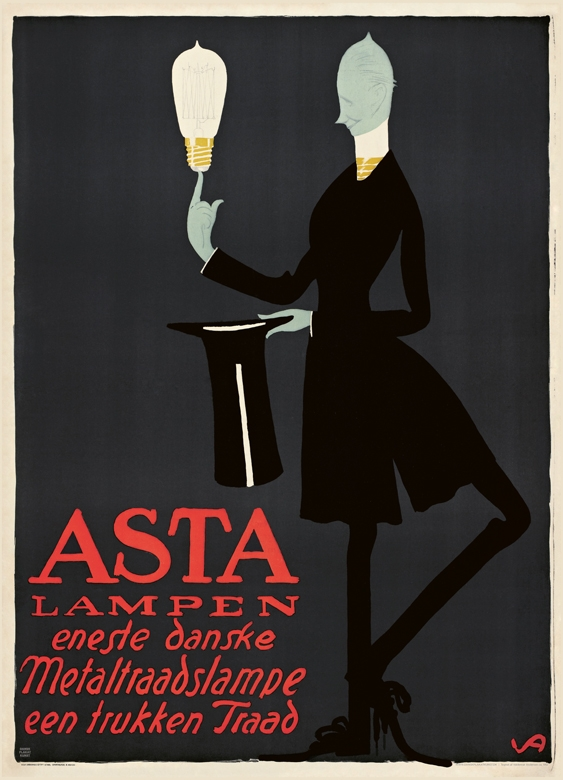
Asta Lamp (1912)

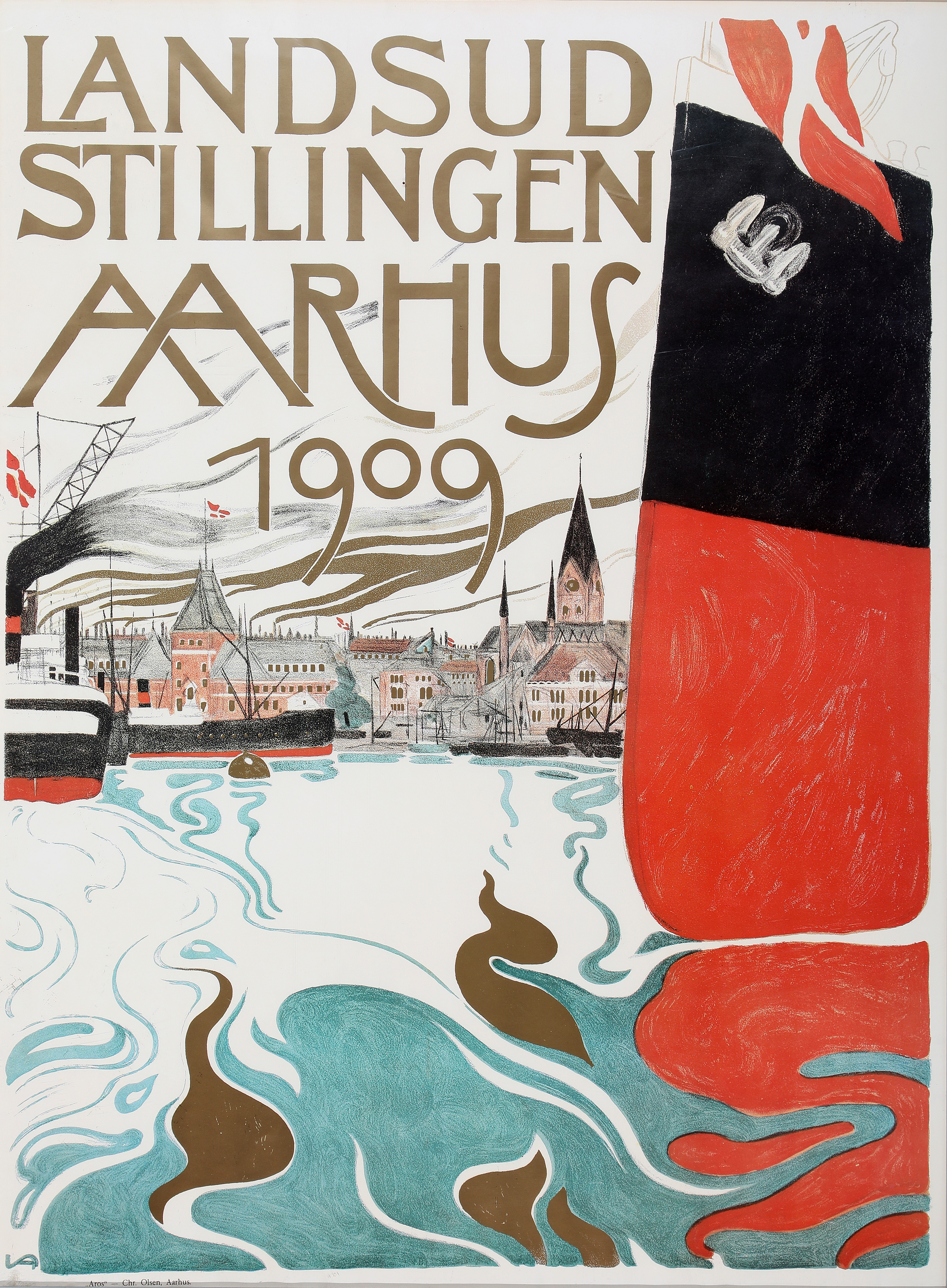
National Exhibition in Aarhus (1909)

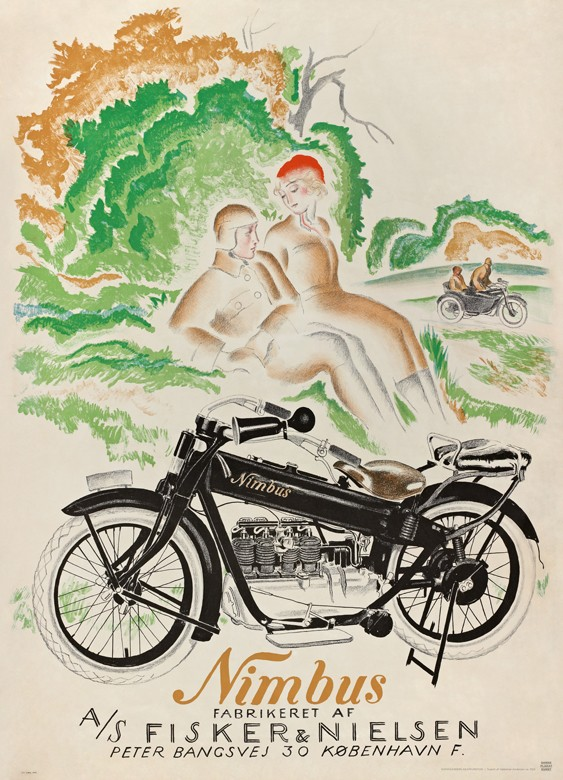
Nimbus (1926)

== See also ==
- Sven Henriksen
