= Frederik Hegel =

Danish bookseller and publisher

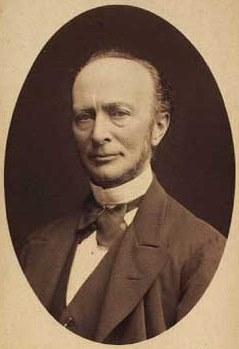
Frederik Hegel (1876). Photograph by Hansen, Schou & Weller

Frederik Vilhelm Hegel (11 May 1817 – 27 December 1887) was a Danish bookseller and publisher. He was born in Fredensborg. He started working for the bookstore Gyldendalske Boghandel at the age of fifteen, and took over the company in 1850. Under his leadership Gyldendal published many of the most important Norwegian writers, including Bjørnson, Ibsen, Kielland, Lie and Asbjørnsen. Hegel also published a number of dictionaries, periodicals and school books.
