= Harsdorff House =

Historic property in Copenhagen, Denmark

- Harsdorffs Hus
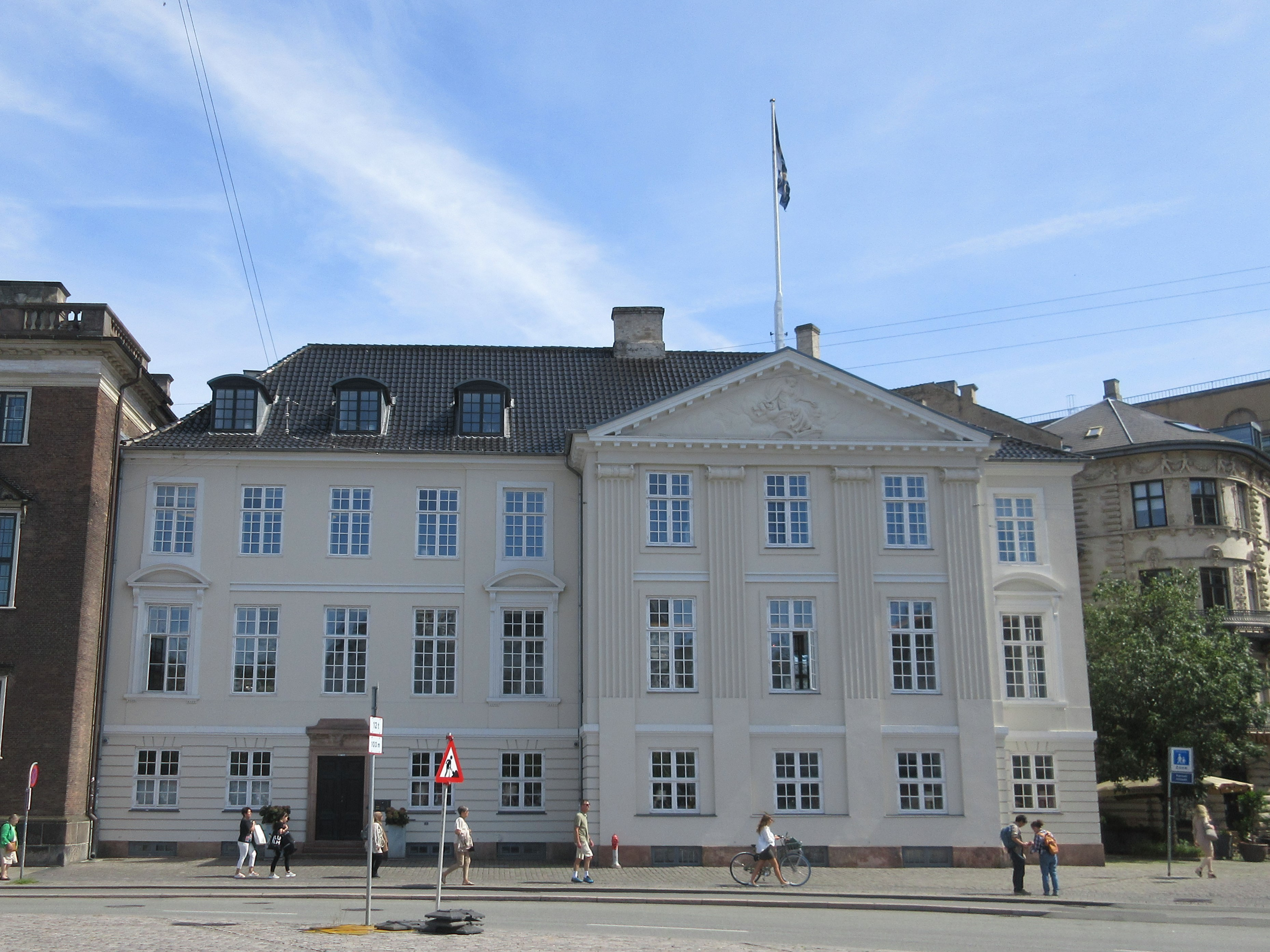
- The Harsdorff House in July 2024.
- Interactive map of the Harsdorff House area

General information
- Architectural style: Neoclassicism
- Location: Copenhagen, Denmark
- Coordinates: 55°40′47.92″N 12°35′12.56″E
- Construction started: 1779
- Completed: 1780
- Owner: Karberghus

Design and construction
- Architect: Caspar Frederik Harsdorff

The Harsdorff House (Harsdorffs Hus) is a historic property located on Kongens Nytorv in central Copenhagen, Denmark. It was built by Caspar Frederik Harsdorff in 1780 and was in the same time to serve as inspiration for the many uneducated master builders of the time. The Ministry of Foreign Affairs was based in the building from 1864 to 1923.

== History ==
=== Background and construction ===
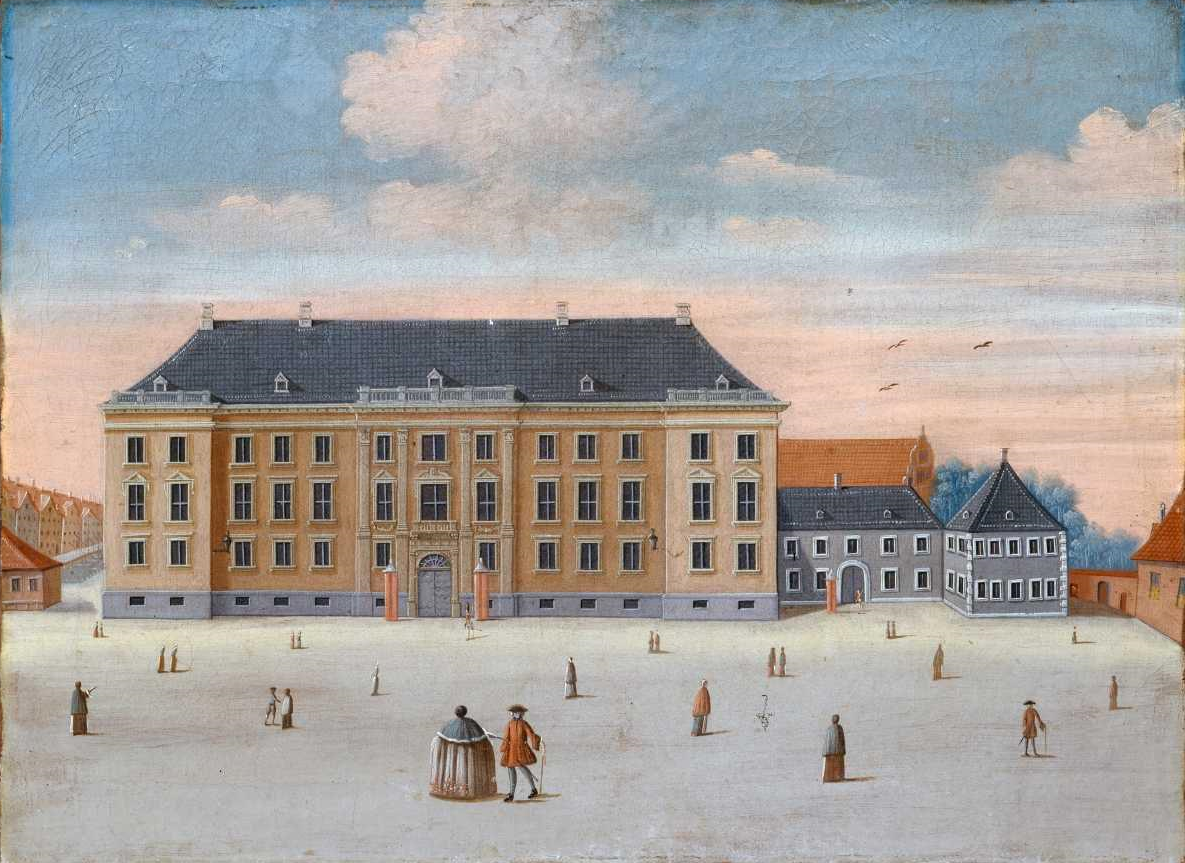
The small buildings located next to Charlottenborg seen on a drawing from the middle of the 18th century

Caspar Frederik Harsdorff (1735–1799) became professor of perspective at the Royal Danish Academy of Fine Arts in 1766. In 1770 he succeeded Nicolas-Henri Jardin (1720–1799) as royal building master and the following year he took over his residence in the south wing of Charlottenborg Palace. The Royal Academy's secretary, Christian Æmilius Biehl, had a residence next to the palace. His daughter, Charlotte Dorothea Biehl (1731–1788) spend some of her childhood in the building. After Biehl's death the building was designated for demolition and Harsdorff was consulted on the matter. He proposed that the site was given to him and he would build a house which could serve as inspiration for the builders of the increasing number of bourgeois houses in the city.

Architects who had studied at the academy were in general only used by the state and members of the aristocracy. The king accepted the offer. Construction began in 1779 and was completed in 1780. The building was never actually used by Harsdorff personally.

=== Tenants ===
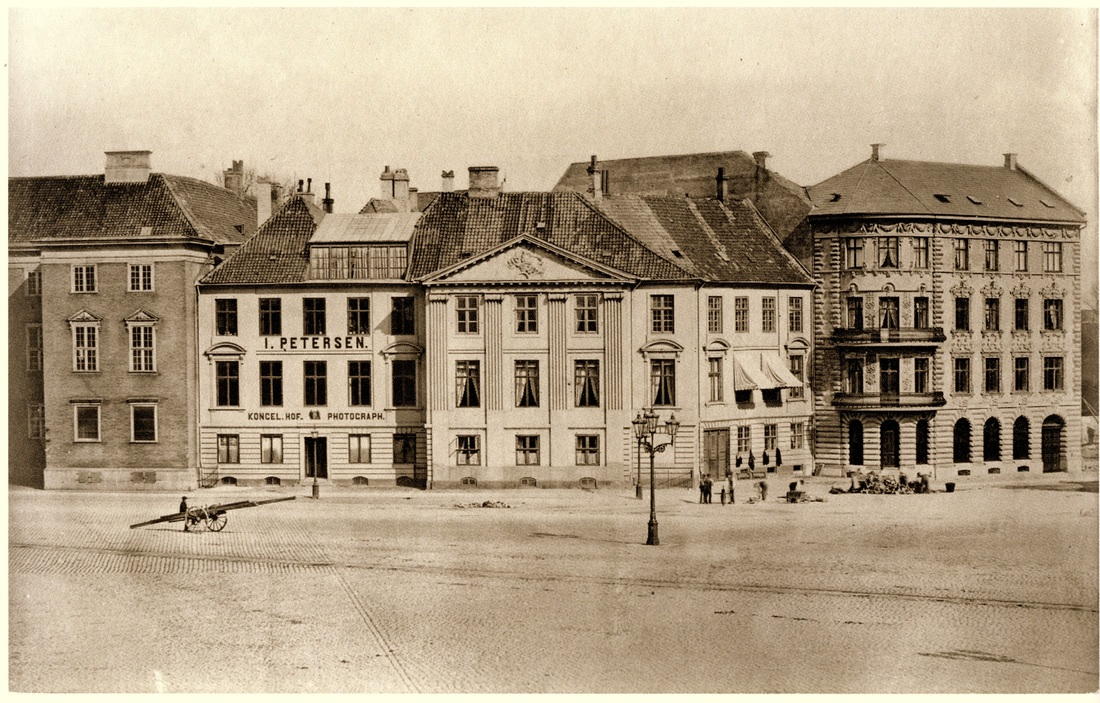
Harsdorff House photographed in 1866

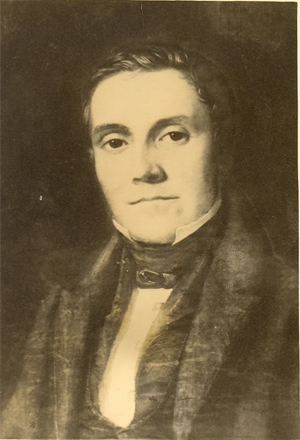
Jacques Eugene Pierre Vincent

Frenchman, Eugen Vincent, who had previously served as cook for Prince Ferdinand, opened Restaurant Vincent in the building in the first half of the 19th century. The restaurant was later operated by his widow Eva Severine Vincent (née Rasmussen) and son Alexander Vincent under the name Madame Vincent. It was visited by Jules Verne during his visit to Copenhagen in 1861.

The merchant and politician Alfred Hage (1803–1872) lived in the building from 1862 and until his death in 1872. Court photographer Jens Petersen (1829–1905) operated a photographic studio in the building from 1865 to 1875.

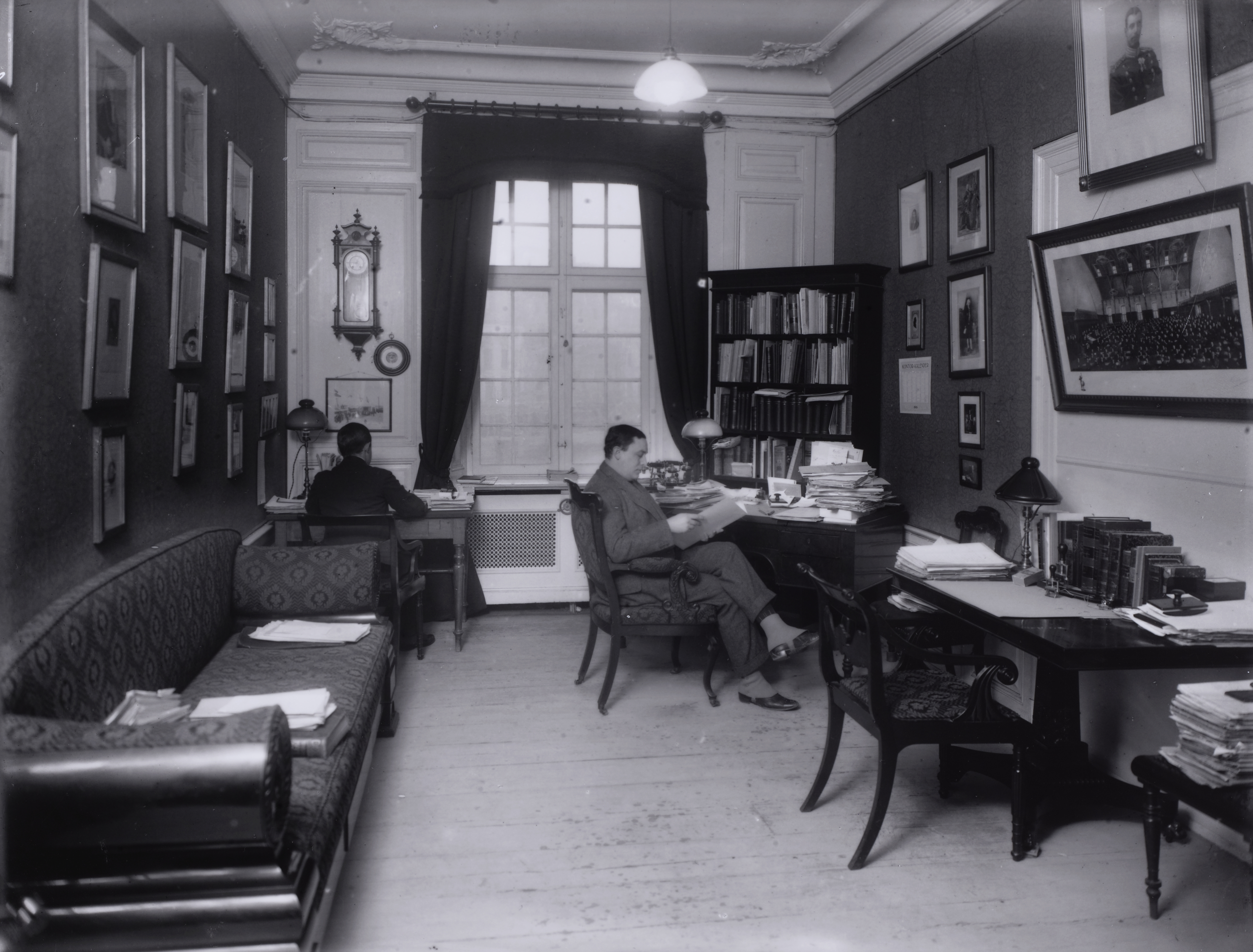
Rotböll photographed in his office in the Ministry of Foreign Affairs by Peter Elfelt, 1015

The Ministry of Foreign Affairs was based in the building from 1864 to 1923. It was then based at Christiansborg Palace and the Yellow Mansion in Amaliegade until its new building at Asiatisk Plads was completed in 1983.

== Architecture ==
Caspar Frederik Harsdorff favoured French classicism inspired by ancient Greece and Rome.

The odd-shaped corner site inspired Harsdorff to build a property with three different model facades. The more monumental, central section is decorated with Ionic order pilasters and crowned by a triangular pediment with relief decoration.

The house came to serve as inspiration for hundreds of houses in the rebuilding of Copenhagen during the years after the Great Fire of 1795.

== Today ==
The building was restored under the direction of architectural firm Fogh & Følner in 1999. The building is now owned by real estate company Karberghus A/S. The tenants include the Harsdorffs Hus Office Club.

== Other sources ==
- Architectural renderings from the Danish National Art Library
