= Lauritz Laurberg Thrane =

Danish master mason architect and builder (1757–1809)

Lauritz Laurberg Thrane (1757–1809) was a Danish master mason architect and builder. He was one of the most active master builders in Copenhagen during the 1790s and 1800s, contributing to the rebuilding of the city following the Copenhagen Fire of 1795. Many of his surviving buildings have been added to the Danish registry of protected buildings and places.

== Biography ==
Thrane was born on 30 January 1757 in Sønderholm, the son of deacon Peder Thrane and Kristiane Frederikke Kristence Laurberg. He completed an apprenticeship as a mason and later studied architecture at the Royal Danish Academy of Fine Arts.

Thrane was licensed as a master mason on 20 April 1795. In the beginning of his career, he frequently collaborated with Philip Lange and at least once with Andreas Gallander but later worked alone.

Thrane married Johanne Kirstine Busch (c. 1751 – 1812) on 15 July 1778. Their son Jacob Laurids Thrane (Wikidata: Q3805787) was also a master mason and architect.

Lauritz Laurberg Thrane died in January 1809 and is buried in Assistens Cemetery.

== Works ==
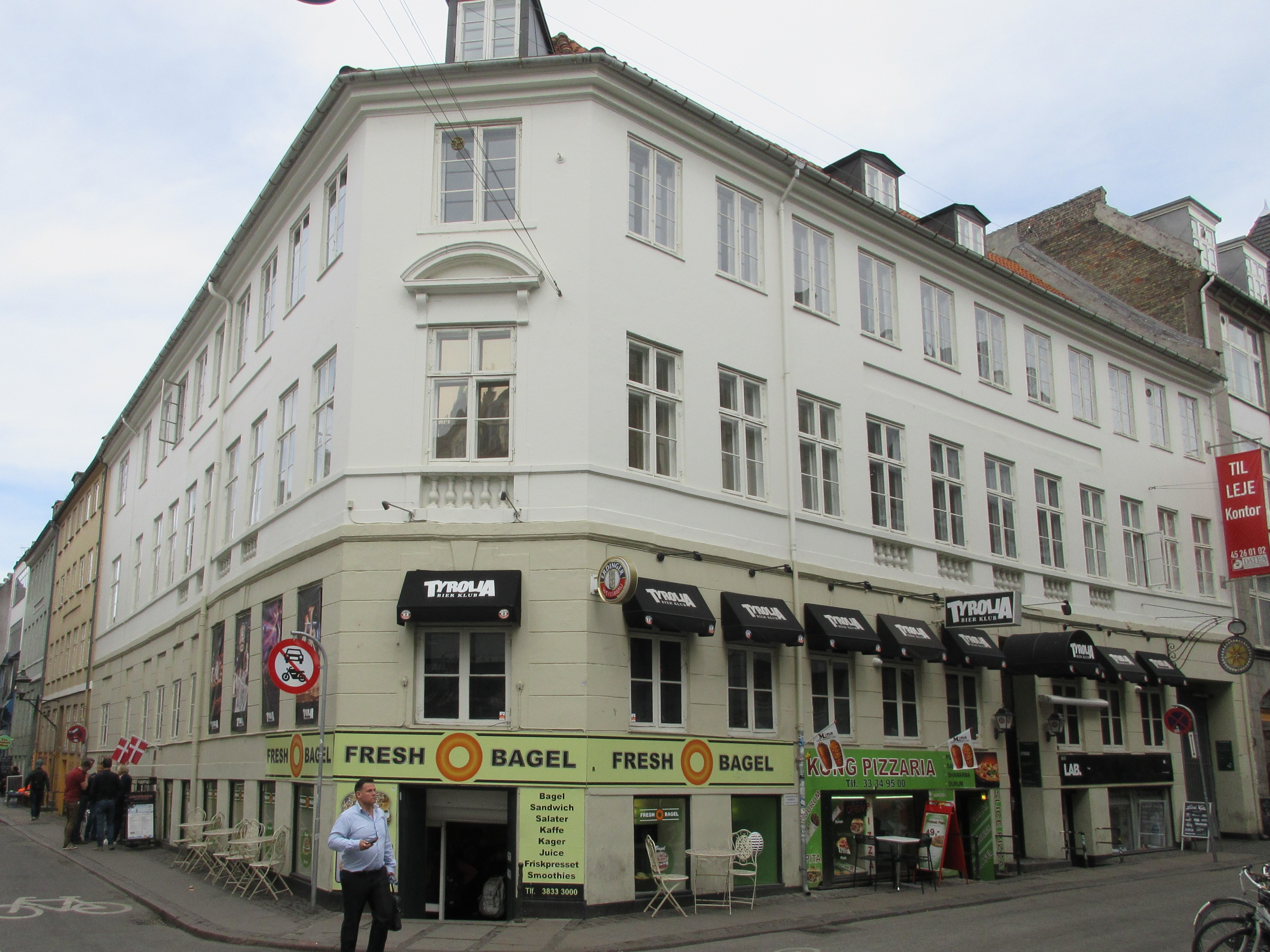
Tre Hjorter, Copenhagen (1796–1797)

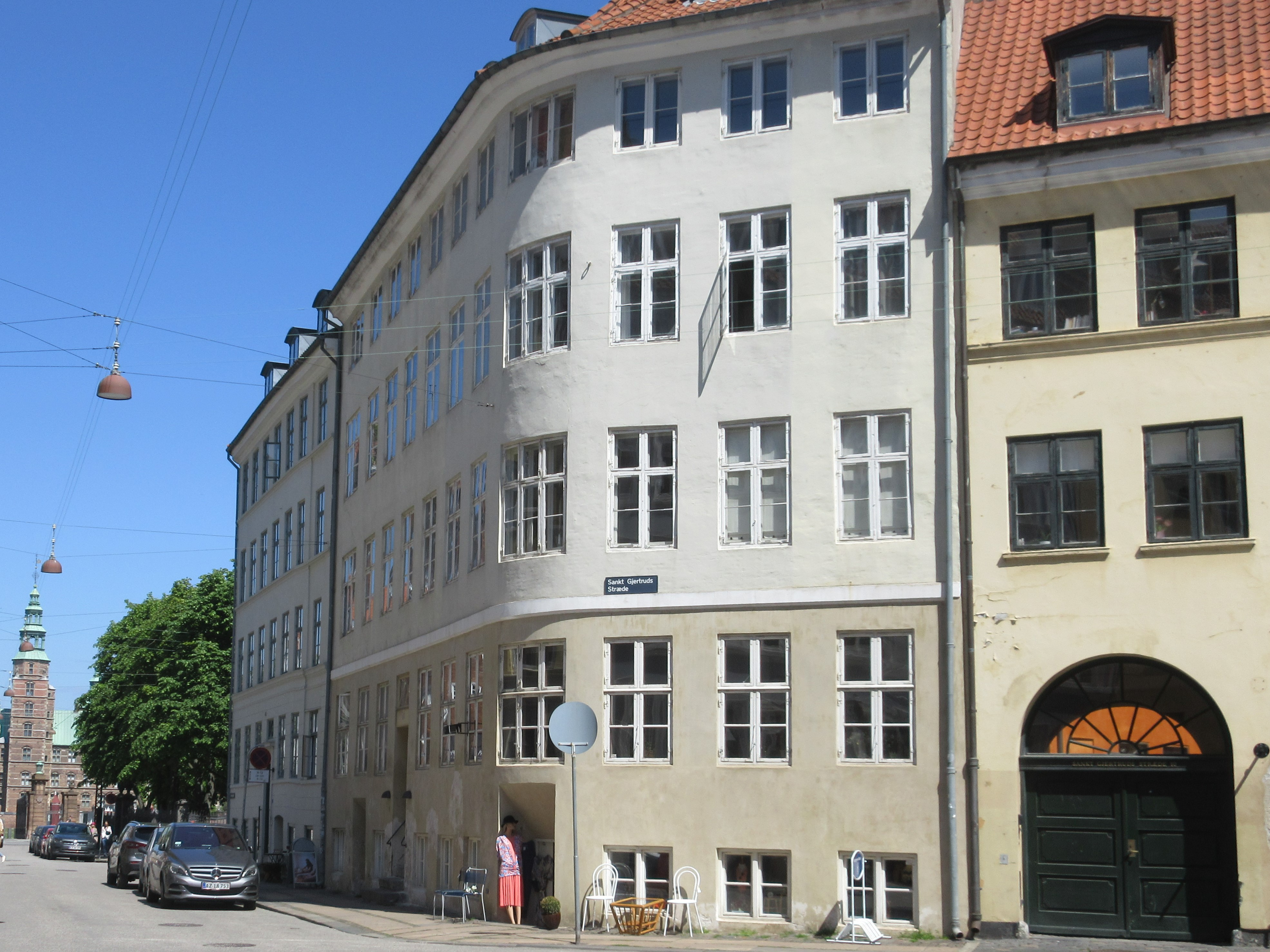
Rosenborggade 10, Copenhagen (1801)

- Brolæggerstræde 3 (1796)
- Tre Hjorter, Vestergade 12 (1796–1797)
- Vestergade 14 (1796–1797, altered)
- Vestergade 16 (1796–1797, with Andreas Hallander, altered)
- Læderstræde 22 (1796–1797, demolished)
- Amagertorv 21 (1796–1798, altered)
- Hyskenstræde 16 (1797)
- Naboløs 2 (1797, with Philip Lange)
- Kompagnistræde 6 (1797, demolished)
- Larsbjørnsstræde 8 (1797, with Philip Lange)
- Vester Voldgade 70/Lavendelstræde 21 (1797, demolished)
- Kompagnistræde 2/Hyskenstræde 18 (1797–1798)
- Vestergade 15/Kattesundet (1797–1798, with Philip Lange)
- Farvergade 12 (1798, demolished)
- Larsbjørnsstræde 6 (1798, with Philip Lange)
- Sankt Peders Stræde 39 (1798, with Philip Lange)
- Sankt Peders Stræde 37 (1798–1799, with Philip Lange)
- Admiralgade 28 / Boldhusgade 1 (1798–1799, with Philip Lange)
- Laksegade 12/Asylgade 10 (1799, with Philip Lange)
- Rosenborggade 10 (1801)
- Køge Town Hall (adaptation), Køge (1806, possibly with J. L. Thrane)
- Lavendelstræde 1/Hestemøllestræde 2 (1806–1807, possibly with J. L. Thrane)
- Wall surrounding Assistens Cemetery, Copenhagen (1804)
