= Rosenborggade 10 =

Property in Copenhagen, Denmark

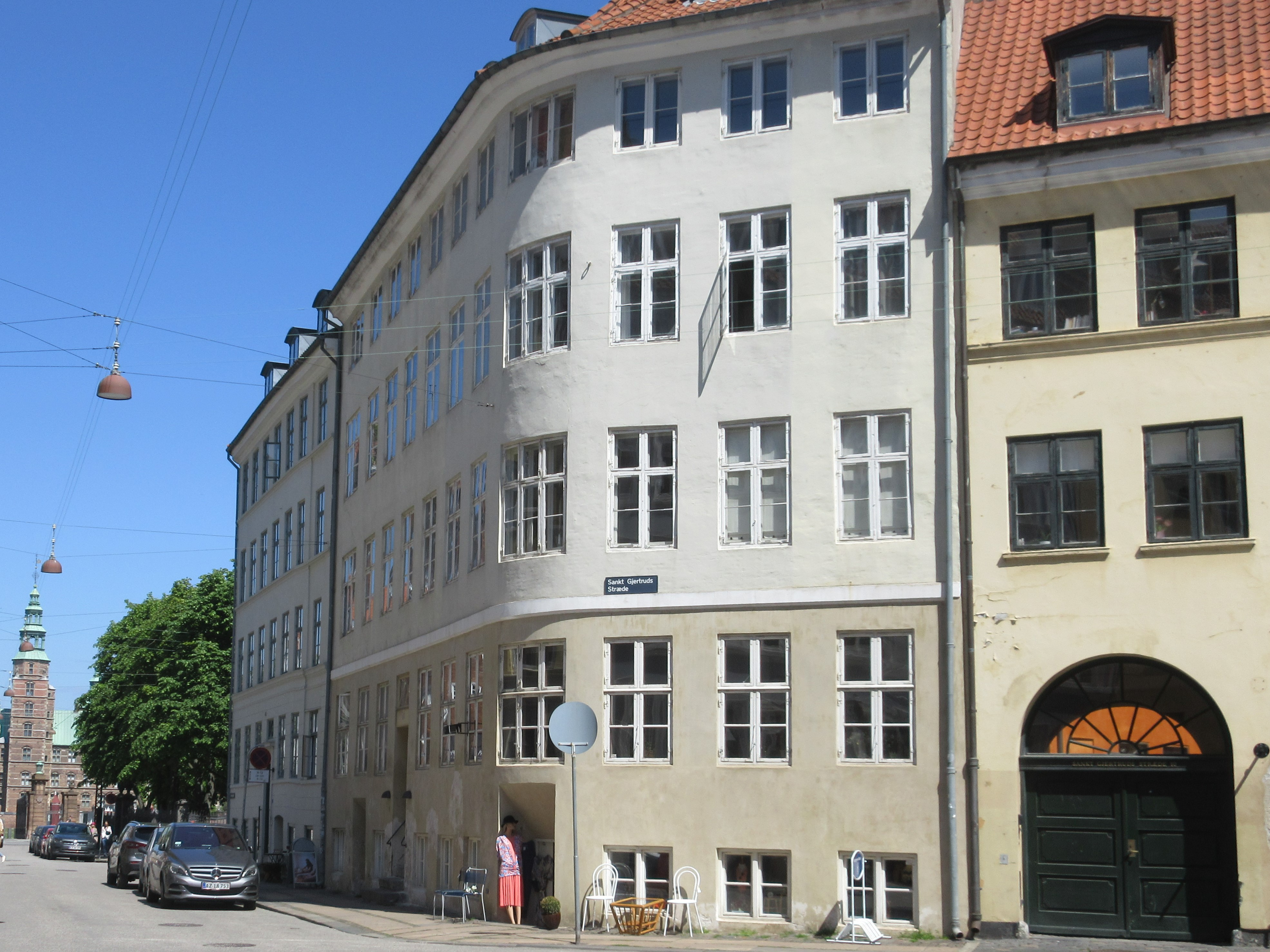
- Interactive map of the Rosenborggade 10 area

General information
- Location: Copenhagen, Denmark
- Coordinates: 55°41′0.71″N 12°34′27.62″E
- Completed: 1801

Rosenborggade 10 is a Neoclassical property situated at the obtuse corner of Rosenborggade and Sankt Gertruds Stræde, close to Nørreport station, in the Old Town of Copenhagen, Denmark. It was constructed in 1801 by Lauritz Laurberg Thrane, one of the most prolific master builders in Copenhagen during the 1790s and 1800s. It was listed in the Danish registry of protected buildings and places in 1979. Former residents include the composer Johan Christian Gebauer and the portrait painter Geskel Saloman.

== History ==
=== 17th and 18th centuries ===
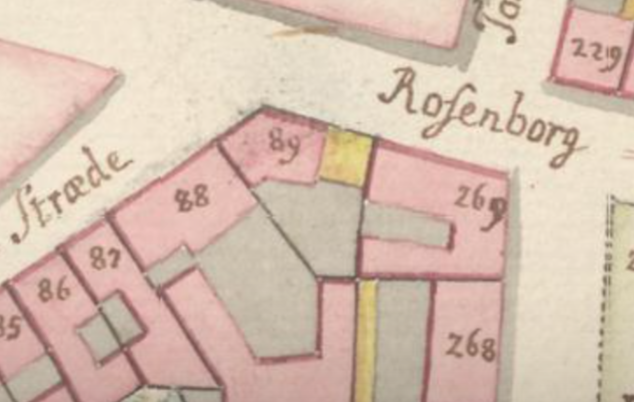
No. 89 seen ion a detail from Gedde's map of Rosenborg Quarter, 1757,

The site was in the late 18th century part of a larger property. In 1689, it was as No. 94 in Rosenborg Quarter owned by Niels Rasmussen. This property was later divided into what is now Rosenborggade 10 and Rosenborggade 12. The property at the corner of Rosenborggade and Sankt Gertruds Stræde was by 1756 as No. 89 owned by distiller Bodel Thorsen Holm.

The property was at the time of the 1787 census home to a total of 15 people distributed on four households. The property was owned by distiller Niels Kiærsgaard. He lived there with his wife Kirstine Maria and a poor six-year-old girl to whom they had opened their home. The second household consisted of Peder Christensen and his wife Mariana. The third household consisted of the 30-year-old widow Anna Margretha Henrichsen, her four-year-old daughter Karen and three lodgers. The last household consisted of labourer Peder Jensen, his wife Anna Christine, the poor four-year-old boy Jens Hansen, the 19-year-old student Herman Bagesen and the 17-year-old junior officer in Prince Frederikch's Regiment Gerhard Feldtmand.

=== 19th century ===
The property was around the turn of the century acquired by master builder Lauritz Laurberg Thrane. The current building on the site was constructed by him in 1801. Thrane had until then frequently collaborated with Philip Lange but undertook this construction project alone. The property was in the new cadastre of 1806 listed as No. 212. It was by then still owned by Lauritz Thrane. He died in 1809.

The property was at the time of the 1840 census home to a total of 45 people. Thomas Petersen, a customs official, resided on the ground floor with his wife Anne Sophie née Reuhs and their four children (aged 10–17). The wife's widowed sister Elisa Christiane Schultz née Ramus, her daughter Maria Charlotte Frederikke Schultz, the lodger Søren Sterm and the maid Julie Stephanie Katberg were also living there with them. Frederikke Michaeline Barner. a 38-year-old unmarried woman, resided on the third floor with her two widow lodgers and a maid. Dorothea Marie Zwinchau, the 60-year-old widow of a captain, resided on the third floor with her daughter Ludevine Philippine, the female teacher Anna Marie Aasted, her nephew Christian Hansen Qvist and two lodgers. Peter Christian Schmidt, a master joiner, resided on the ground floor with his wife Karen Christensen, the apprentice Jørgen Larsen, the widow Margarithe Christensen née Petersen. head of division in the Danish Chancery Christian Christensen, Andreas Peter Christensen and three maids.

The composer Johan Christian Gebauer was among the residents in 1843–44.

The property was at the time of the 1845 census home to a total of 43 people. The customs official Thomas Petersen, his wife Anna Sophie née Reuss and the wife sister Elisa Christiane Schultz née Ramus were still occupying the two second floor apartments. The law student Frederik Emanuel Ramus, who would later become a high-ranking civil servant, was now living in the sister's apartment as a lodger.ent. The master joiner Peter Christian Schmidt and his wife Karen née Christensen were also still occupying one of the ground floor apartments. The other ground floor apartment was now occupied by the wife's brother Andreas Peter Christensenamd his wife Dorothea. Helene Ørum (1806-1866), widow of ritmester Lauritz ploug Ørum (1801-1942), resided on the first floor with her 10-year-old son Johan Gustav Emil Waldemar Ørum and a lodger. The lodger was the 24-year-old portrait painter Geskel Saloman. Johan Ludvig Hammerich, a "former grocer" (todligere urtekræmmer), resided with his wife Sophie Frederikke née Holm and their four children (aged 8 to 12) in the other first floor apartment. Hammerich had until at least 1840 owned the property at Gråbrødretorv 4. The fact that he was now referred to as a "former merchant" and that they had moved to a smaller home indicates that he had gone bankrupt with his business.

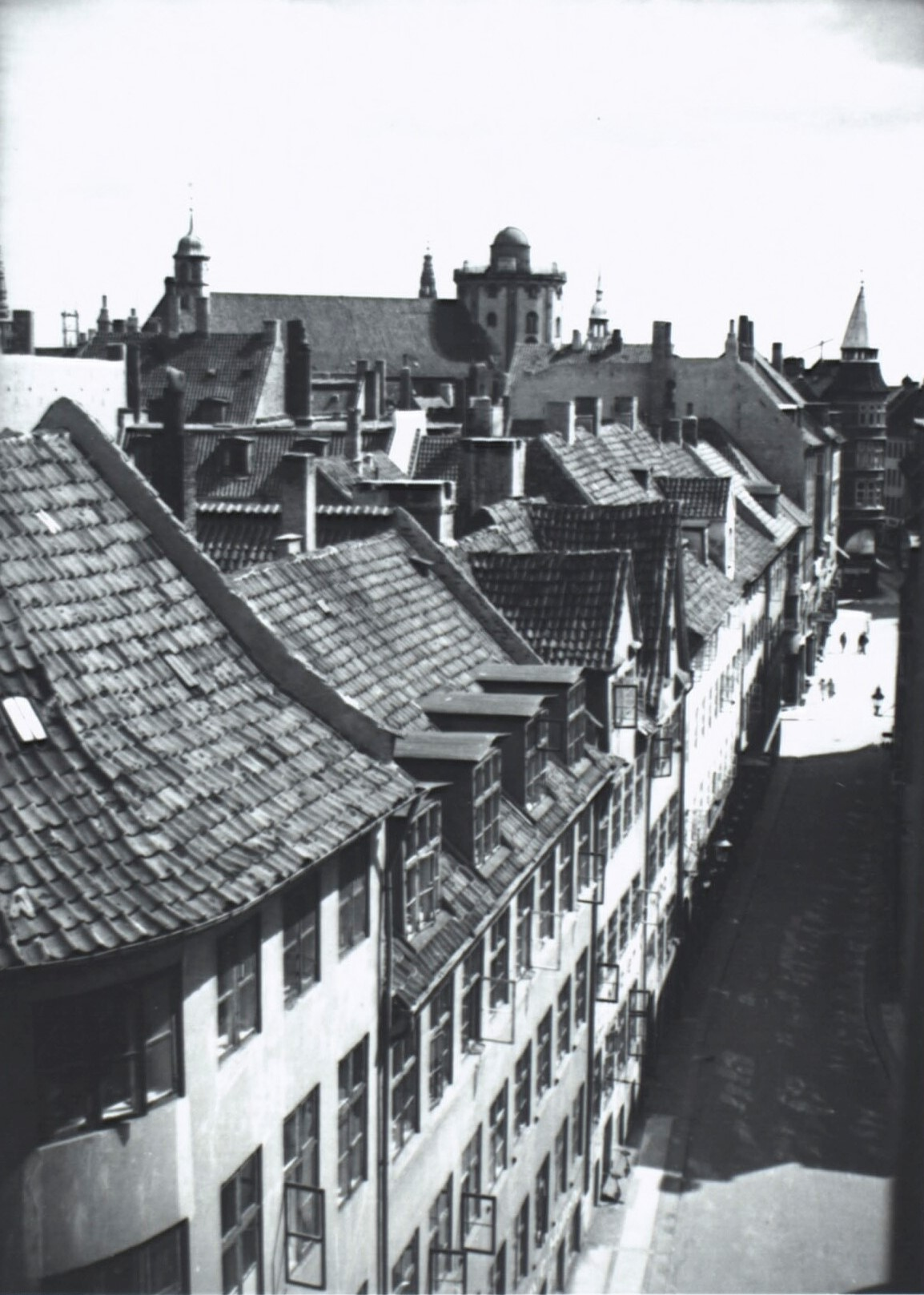
A bird's eye view of Sankt Gertruds Stræde with a bit of Rosenborggade 10 seen to the left.

Johan Jacob Tetzlaff, a businessman, was now residing with his with his wife Johanne Birgithe Tetzlaff, their daughter and the gardener Diderik Bernhart Riise.

Sophie Frederikke Hammerich was at the time of the 1850 census still residing in the apartment on the first floor. Her husband was by then listed as "for a short time" being employed as a customs assistant in Nyborg. His employment in Nyborg would ultimately turn out not to be for such a short time. He is at the time of the 1860 census thus still registered as a customs assistant in Nyborg and had by then been joined by his wife.

The politician, publisher and bookdealer Harald Brix resided on the third floor in around 1863.

=== 20th century ===
The property belonged to the businessman Viggo Harald Schiellerup (1864-) in 10+9.

== Architecture ==
Rosenborggade 10 is constructed with four storeys over a walk-out basement. The facade of the building is broken in an obtuse angle with seven bays facing Rosenborggade, three bays facing Sankt Gertruds Stræde and a double-wide bow-shaped corner bay. The plastered, white-painted facade is finished by a belt course above the ground floor and a simple cornice below the roof. The main entrance in the centre of the central bay towards Rosenborggade is raised a few steps from street level, inset and topped by a transom window. The basement entrance is located at the corner. The pitched roof is clad with red tile. It features three dormer windows.

== Today ==
The building is today owned by E/F Rosenborggade 10 and contains two condominiums on each floor. Kongens Klæ´r, a vintage shop, is based in the basement.

== Gallery ==
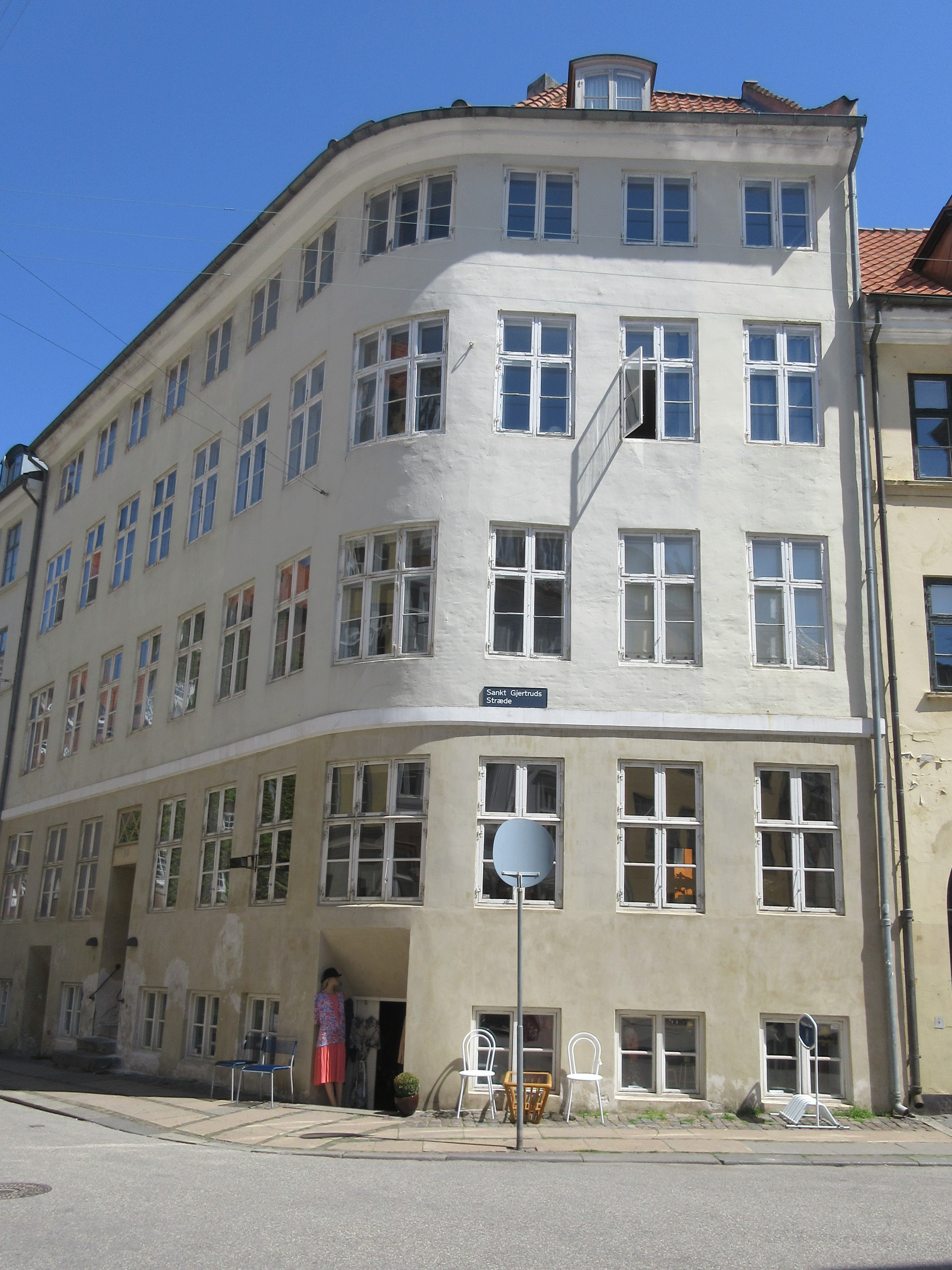

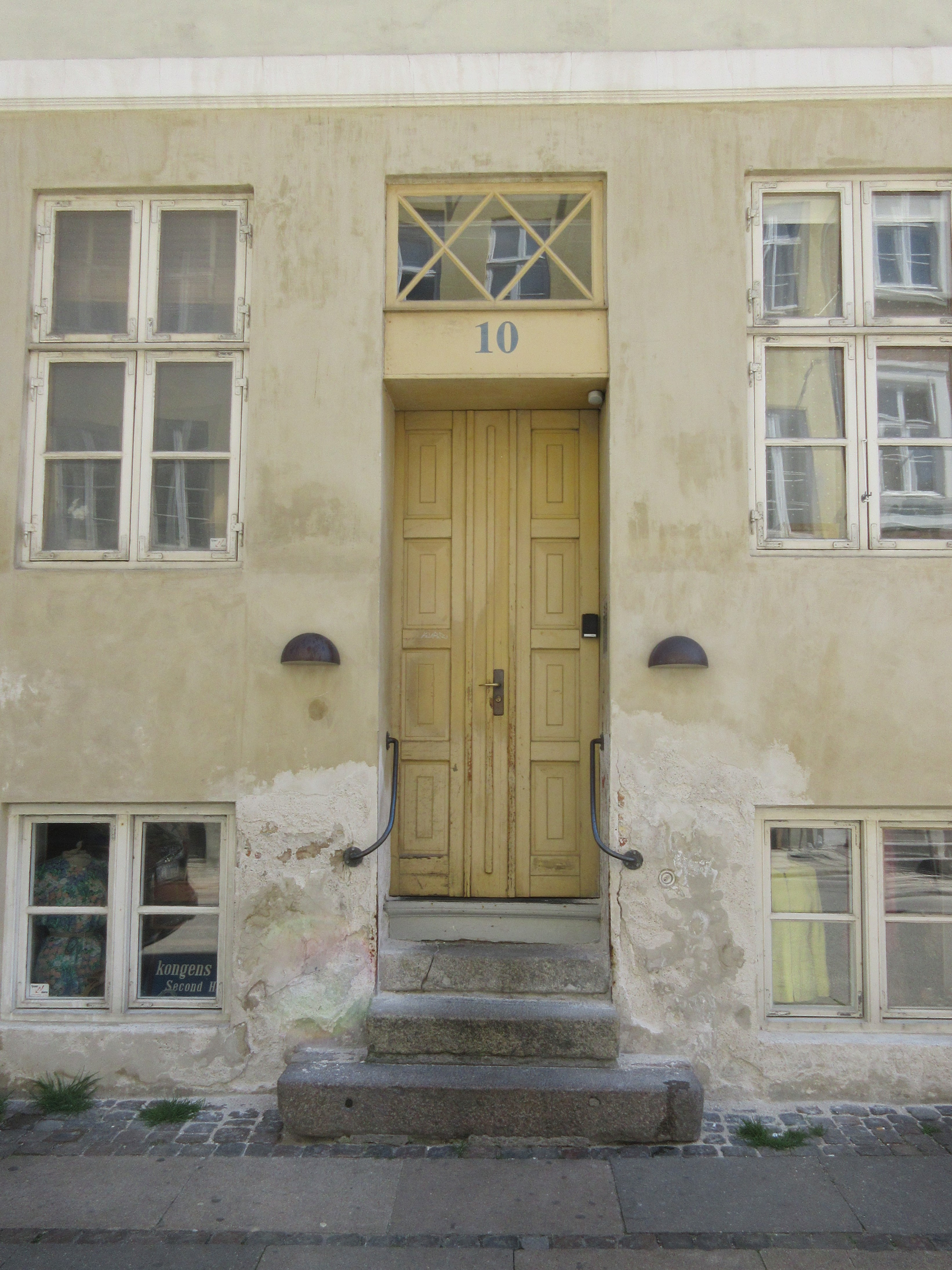
The main entrance
