= Tre Hjorter =

Building in Copenhagen, Denmark

Holm House
- Tre Hjorter
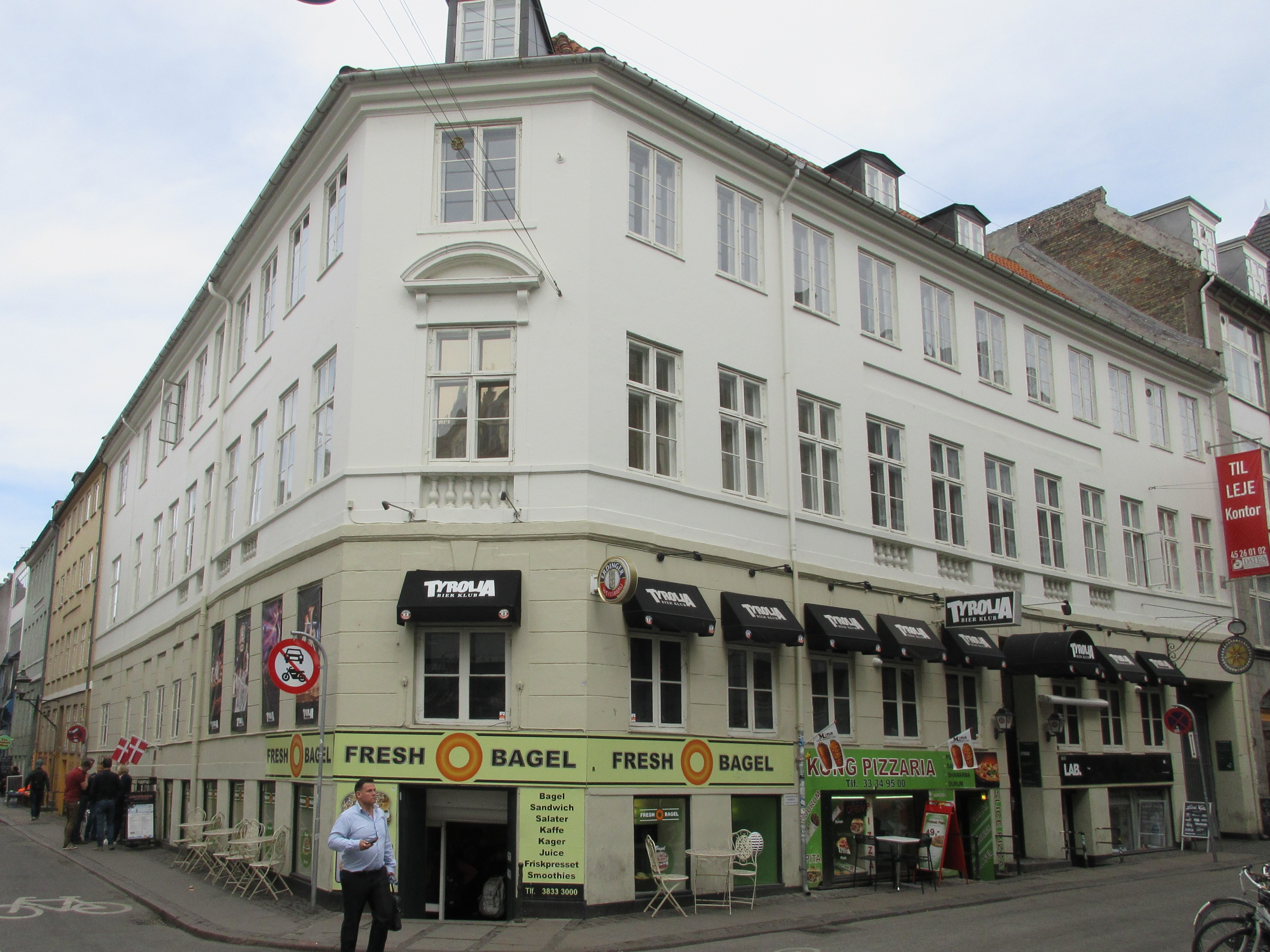
- Interactive map of the Holm House area

General information
- Location: Copenhagen, Denmark
- Coordinates: 55°40′40.13″N 12°34′13.13″E
- Completed: 1797
- Client: Hinrich Ladiges

Tre Hjorter is a former hotel located on the corner of Vestergade (No. 12) and Larsbjørnstræde in the Latin Quarter of central Copenhagen, Denmark. It now houses a bar on the ground floor. The building was listed on the Danish registry of protected buildings and places in 1939.

== History ==
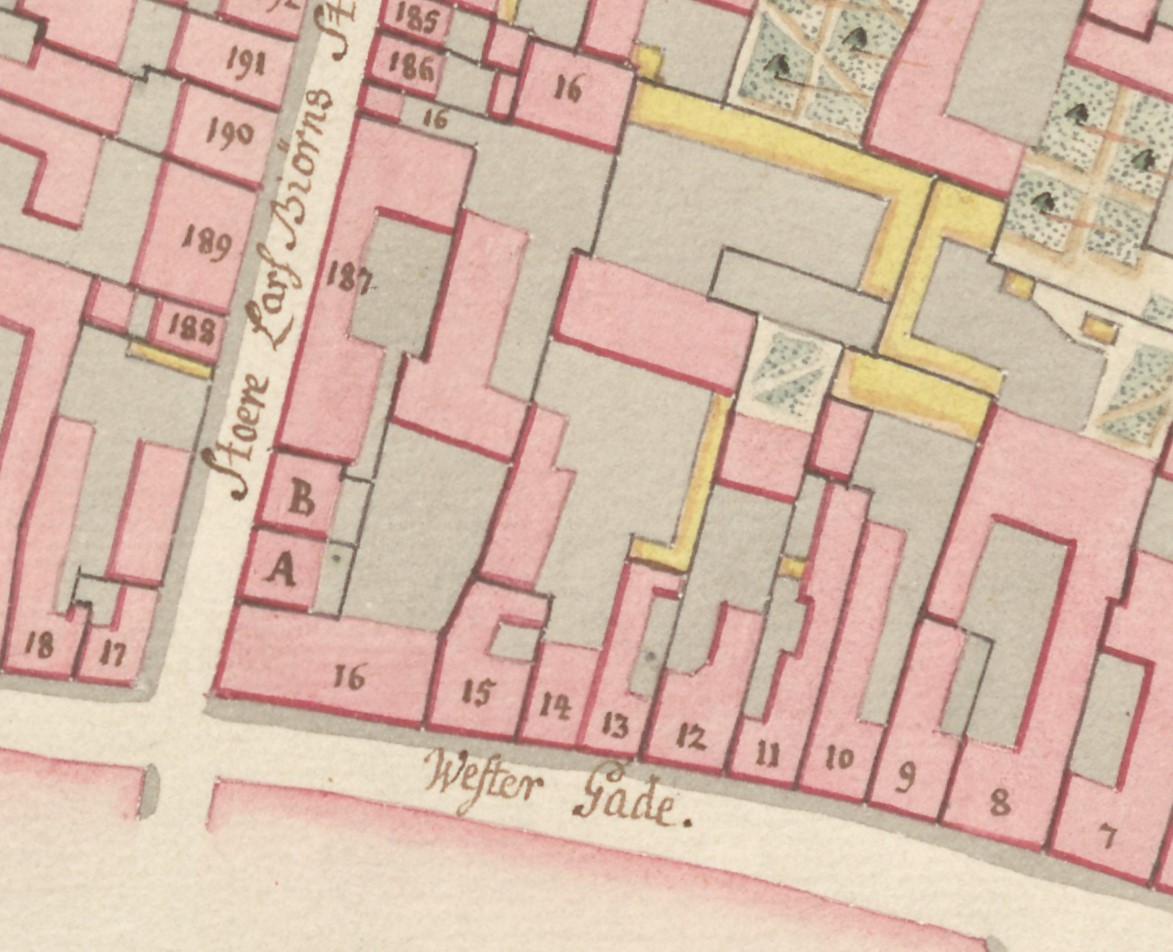
No. 16 seen on a detail from Gedde's district map of Northern Quarter, 1757.

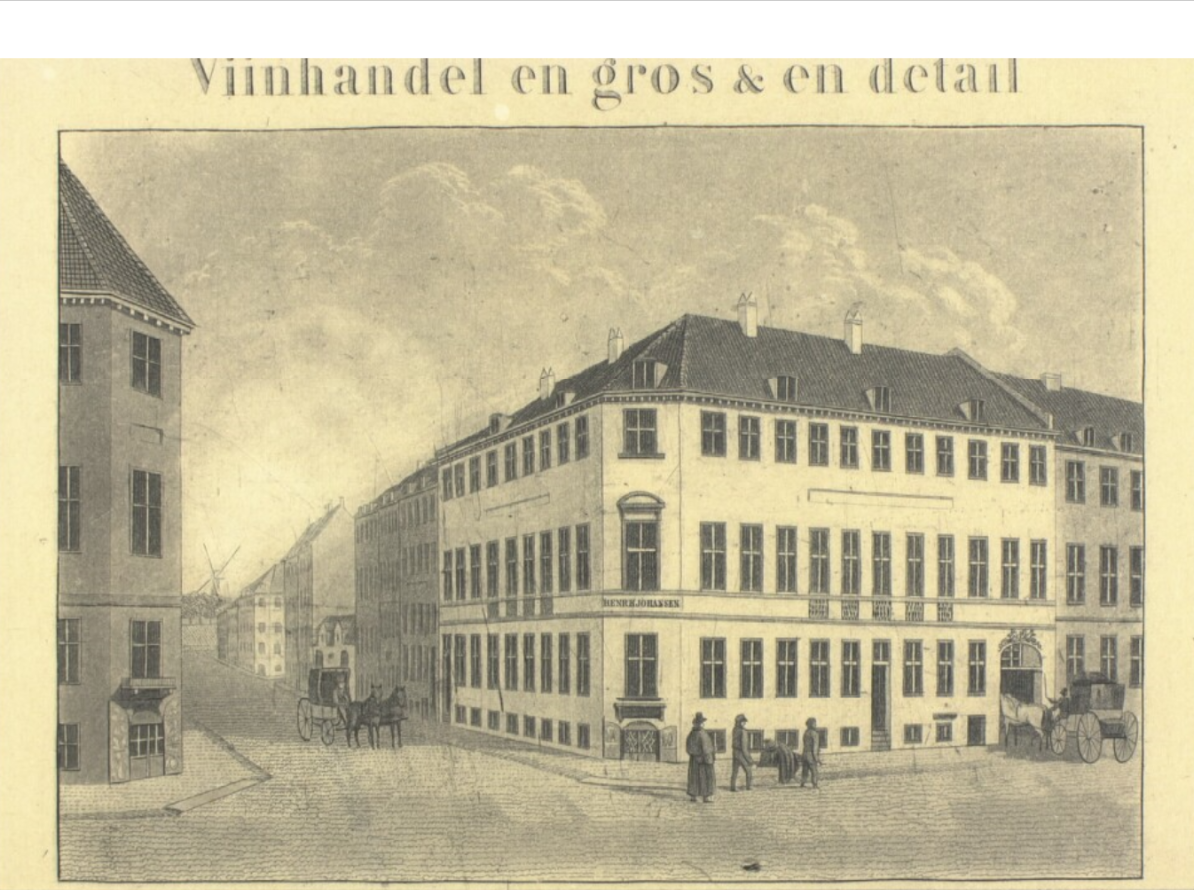
The Tre Hjorter building seen on a lithograph from c. 1750

Erik Valkendorff, a relative of the later stadtholder Christoffer Valkendorf, acquired a property at the site in the middle of the 16th century. In 1681, his descendants sold it to a blacksmith, Jochum Pedersen, who sold off the land in lots. The corner lot was acquired by an innkeeper, Søren Rasmussen Hjortshøy, who opened a hotel at the site. Its name, De Tre Hjorter, thus contained a reference to his own last name. The hotel was one of many located on the north side of the street, a tradition that dated from a time when the Western City Gate was located at the end of Vestergade.

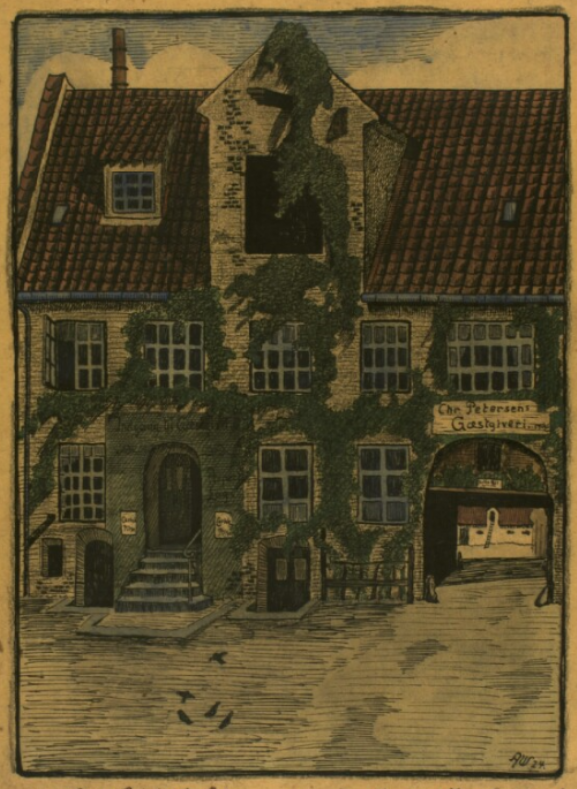
Drawing from the courtyard

It was used by farmers who came into town on market day to sell their produce. The hotel was also frequented by young theologians from the provinces who had come to Copenhagen with the ambition of obtaining employment at one of the city's churches. In the 1720s, this resulted in a scandal that involved Tre Hjorter's owners, Peter and Ane Sørensen Berg. Ane claimed to have connections in the right circles and operated a lucrative business conveying bribes that were supposed to improve the aspiring priests' chances. In 1725, Ane was arrested and sentenced to time in the notorious Spinning House in Christianshavn while her husband was thrown out of Copenhagen. She was, however, pardoned the following year but also thrown out of the city.

A few years later, Tre Hjorter was completely destroyed in the Copenhagen Fire of 1728 but was rebuilt. A 15-year-old C. E. F. Weyse stayed at Tre Hjorter when he first came to Copenhagen from Altona and resided there until the composer Abraham Peter Schultz offered him accommodation in his apartment in Bredgade.

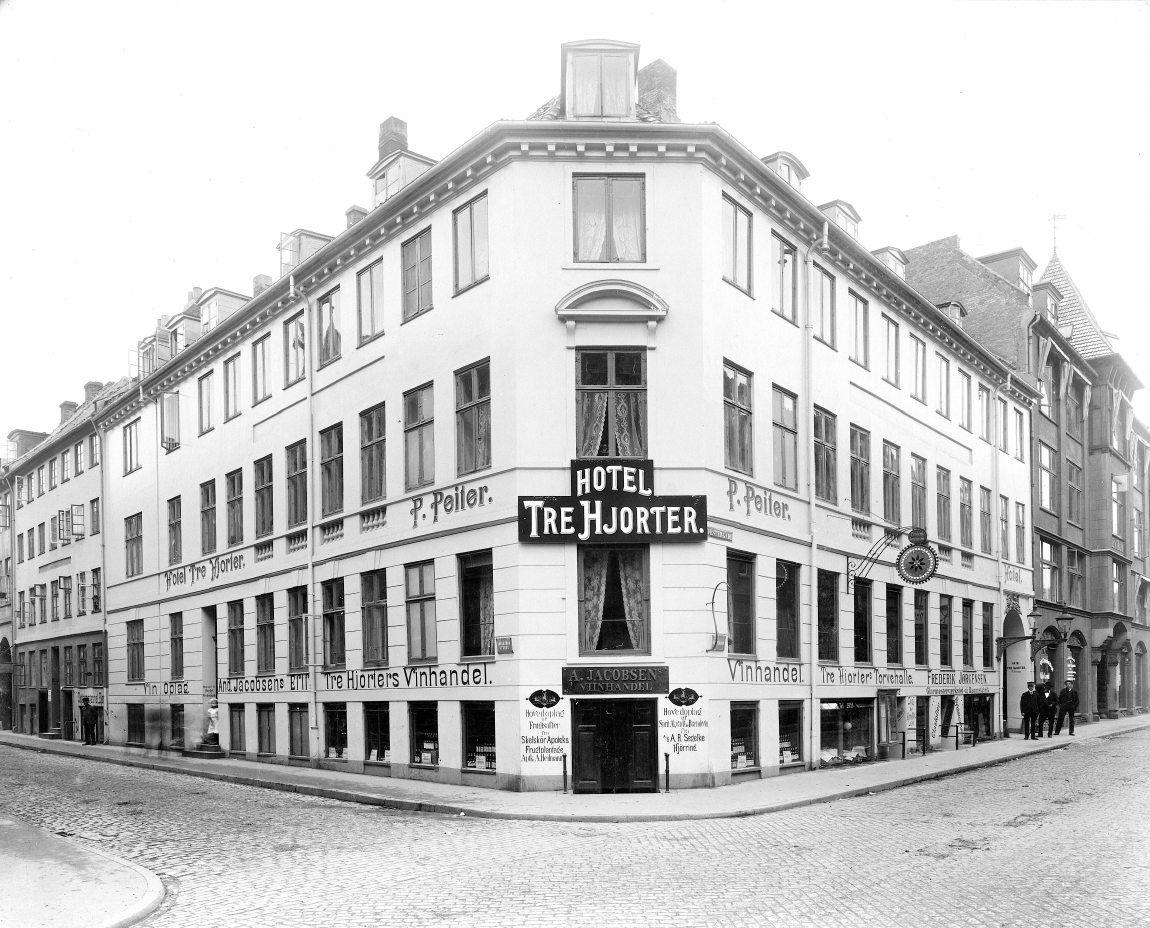
Photograph of the building by Johannes Hauerslev

In 1795, Hotel Tre Hjorter was once again lost to the flames in the Second Great Fire. Its owner, Jørgen Sorterup, commissioned Lauritz Laurberg Thrane to rebuild his hotel. Construction started the following year and was completed in 1797. The mail coaches for destinations on Zealand began to use the complex as a terminus. The mail coaches entered the courtyard to the rear of the hotel through a gateway at Vestergade 12 and departed via a gateway at Larsbjørnstræde 10. The courtyard contained stables, warehouses and a post office.

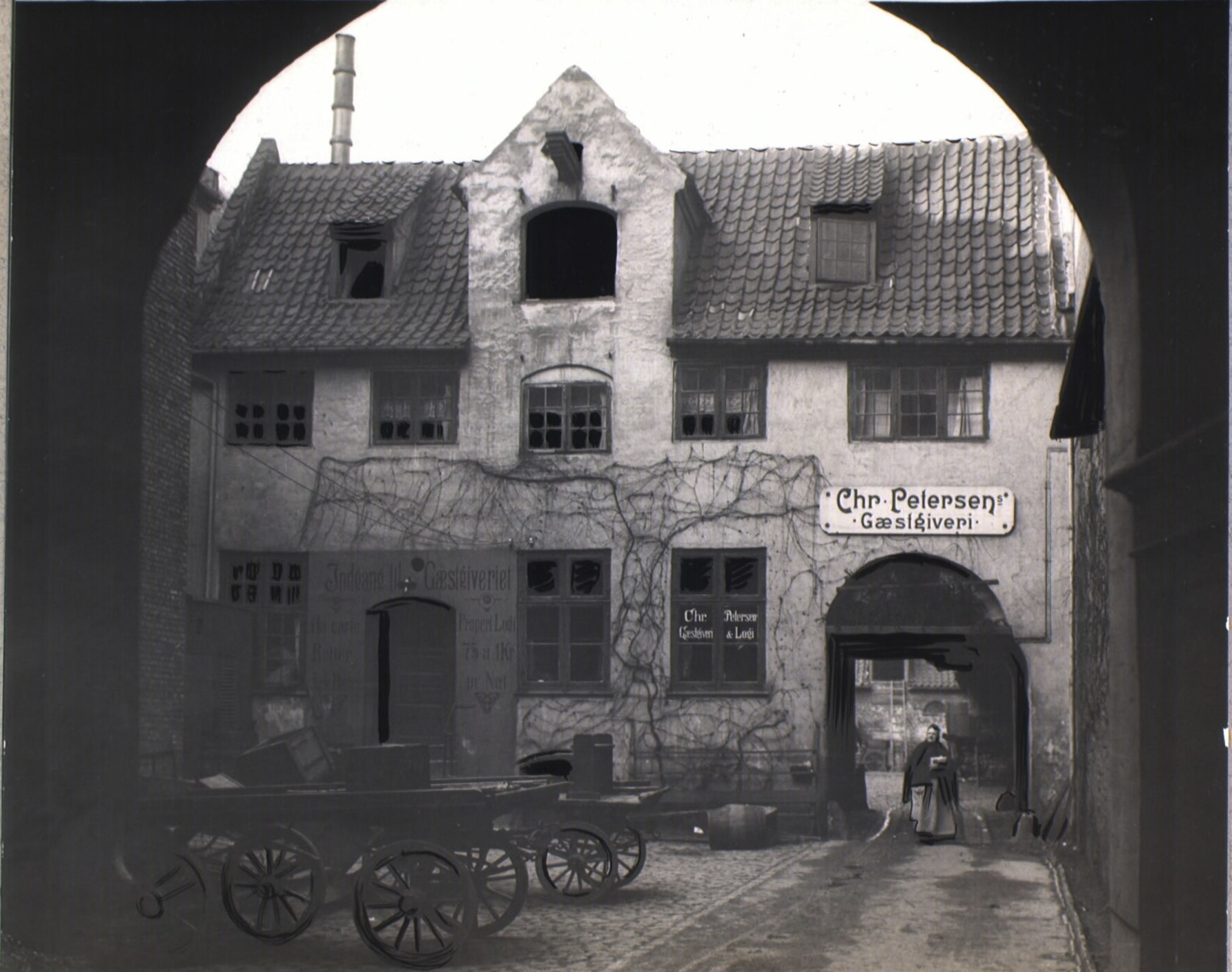
The courtyard in February 1914

The mail coaches disappeared when the new railway station opened in 1847. The old hostels in Vestergade were also faced with new competition when several large, modern hotels opened around the corner on Vester Voldgade in the 1880s and 1890s. Hotel Tre Hjorter was the only hotel left in Vestergade by the time that it closed in 1929.

All the buildings in the courtyard were demolished in 1939 and replaced by a modern four-storey building. The tenants in the new building included a photographer, an importer a men's hats, a manufacturer of blinds and a book printer.

== Today ==
Tyrolia Bier Klub, a bar owned by Rekon Group, is located in the ground floor. The premises has previously housed the bars Woodstock og Frøken Nielsen.

== Cultural references ==
Tre Kroner is mentioned in Ludvig Holberg's comedy Den Ellevte Juni (11 June).
