= Naboløs 2 =

Building in Copenhagen, Denmark

Naboløs 4
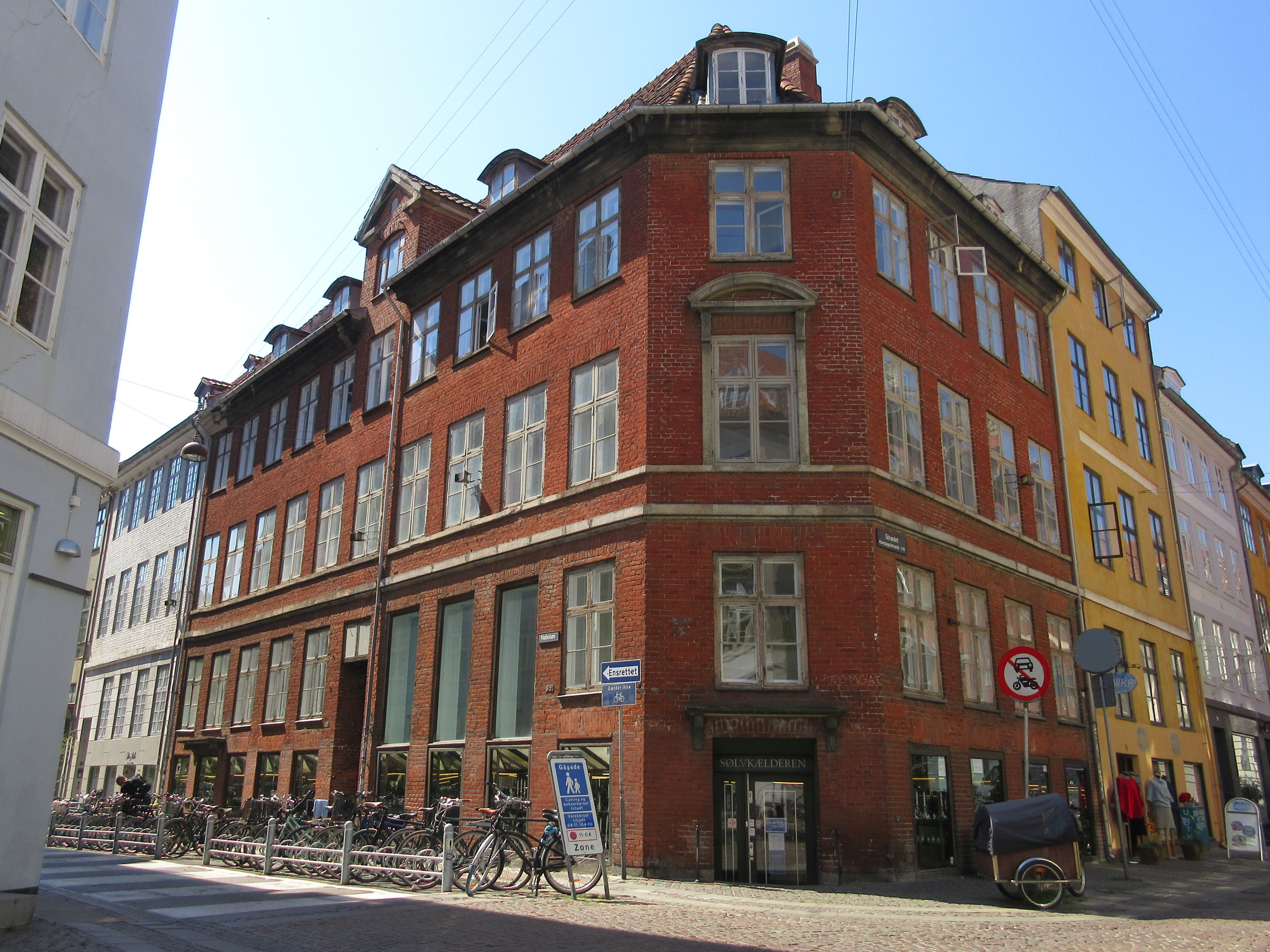
- Interactive map of the Naboløs 4 area

General information
- Architectural style: Neoclassical
- Location: Copenhagen, Denmark
- Coordinates: 55°40′39.4″N 12°34′36.84″E
- Completed: 1797

Naboløs 2 / Kompagnistræde 1 is a Neoclassical property situated at the corner of Naboløs (No. 2) and Kompagnistræde (No. 1) in the Old Town of Copenhagen, Denmark. It is one of a substantial number of similar apartment buildings constructed by the master masons Philip Lange and Lauritz Thrane as part of the rebuilding of the city following the Copenhagen Fire of 1795. It was listed in the Danish registry of protected buildings and places in 1945.

== History ==
=== 18th century ===
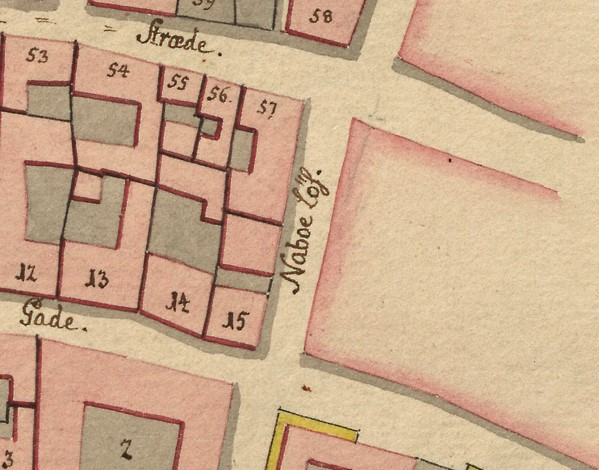
No. 57 seen on a detail from Christian Gedde's map of Snaren's Quarter, 1756

The property was in 1689 as No. 58 in Snaren's Quarter owned by ropemaker Carsten Carstensen. In 1756, it was as No. 57 owned by carpenter Christen Olsen.

The property was in 1787 home to a total of 30 people distributed on five households. It was owned by merchant (urtekræmmer) Lars Wiliken Hornemann (1734-1808). He lived there with his wife Anna Ussing (1749-1934), their two daughters, an employee and two maids. Carel Magnus Bergstrøm, a gilder, lived there with his wife, their three children, an apprentice and a maid. Peter Ascanius lived there with two maids. In 1776–1788, he served as superintendent ("Berg Hauptmand") at the Kongsberg Mine in Norway with responsibility for iron smelting and hammering. Ole Hansen, a courier employed by Bergverket in Kongsberg, lived there with his wife, two children and two lodgers. Joseph Isack Una, a Jewish merchant, lived there with his wife, two children, two more relatives and a maid.

The building was together with most of the other buildings in the area destroyed in the Copenhagen Fire of 1795. The current building was constructed by Philip Lange and Lauritz Thrane in 1797.

=== 19th century ===
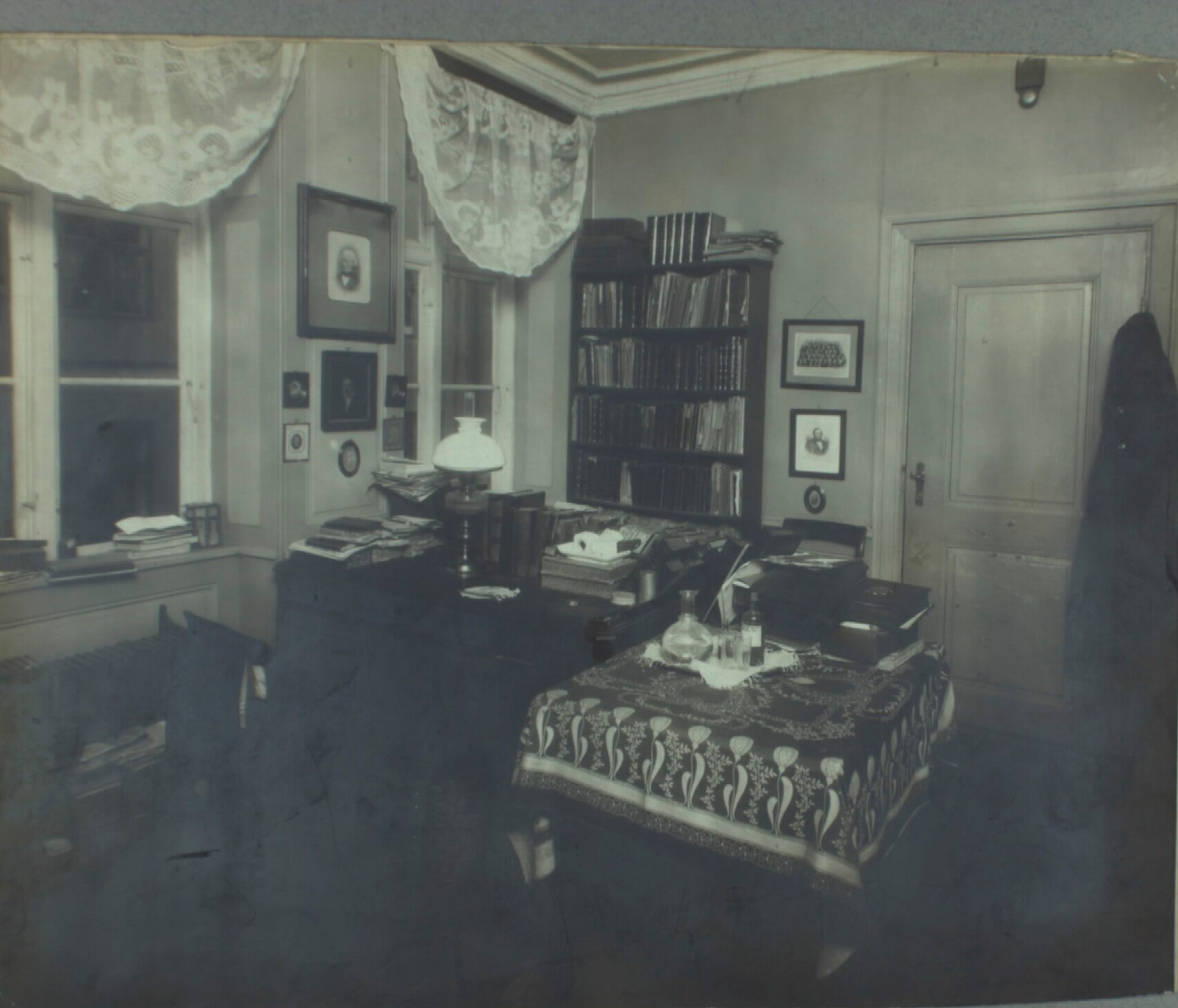
Oscar Siesbye's living room at Naboløs 2

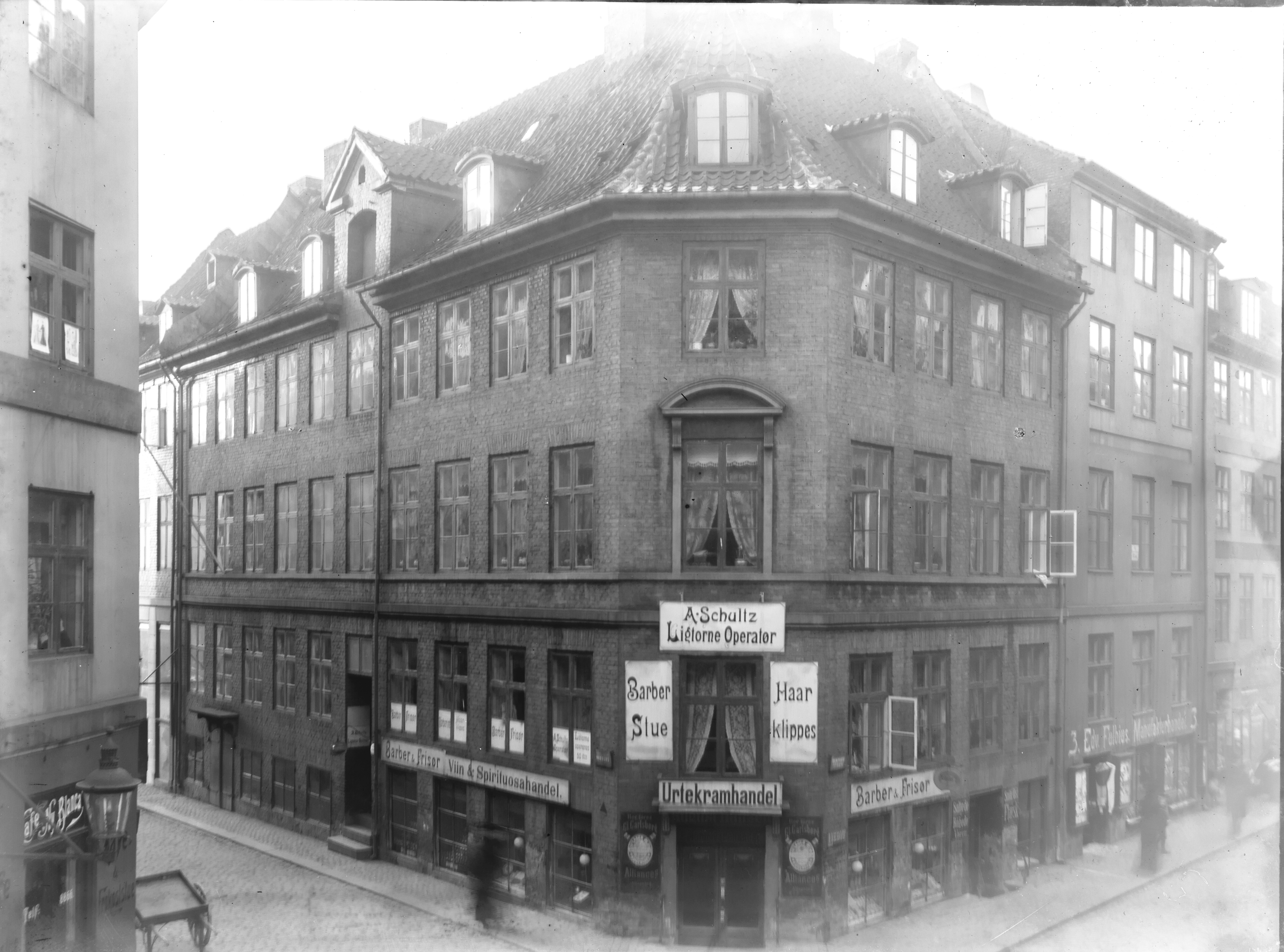
Naboløs 2 photographed by Frederik Riise

The property was in the new cadastre of 1806 listed as No. 60. It was by then owned by merchant (urtekræmmer) Søren Lunge Mulvad (1765-1812). He lived in the building with his wife Christiane Mulvad (1766-1840) and their children Hans Christian (1799-1852) and Henriette (1804-1870).

The property was at the time of the 1840 census home to a total of 42 people. The now 74-year-old widow Christiane Mulvad was residing in one of the ground floor apartments with the son Hans and a maid. The other ground floor apartment was occupied by merchant Andreas Brønnum (1804), his wife Catharine Brønnum (1810-), their six children, a housemaid and three employees. Peter Georg Haas (c. 1798–1855), a first lieutenant at the Royal Life Guards, resided with his wife, their four children and two maids in one of the apartments on the first floor. Israel Salomon, a glass merchant, lived with his wife Amalie, their three children and a maid in one of the apartments on the second floor. The other apartment on the second floor was occupied by the customs officer Niels Conrad Hellesen, his wife Anna Dorthea Hellesen, their six children and a maid. One of the children was the landscape painter Julius Hellesen (1823-1877).

The journalist and diplomat Jules Hansen (1838-1908) resided in the building in 1859.

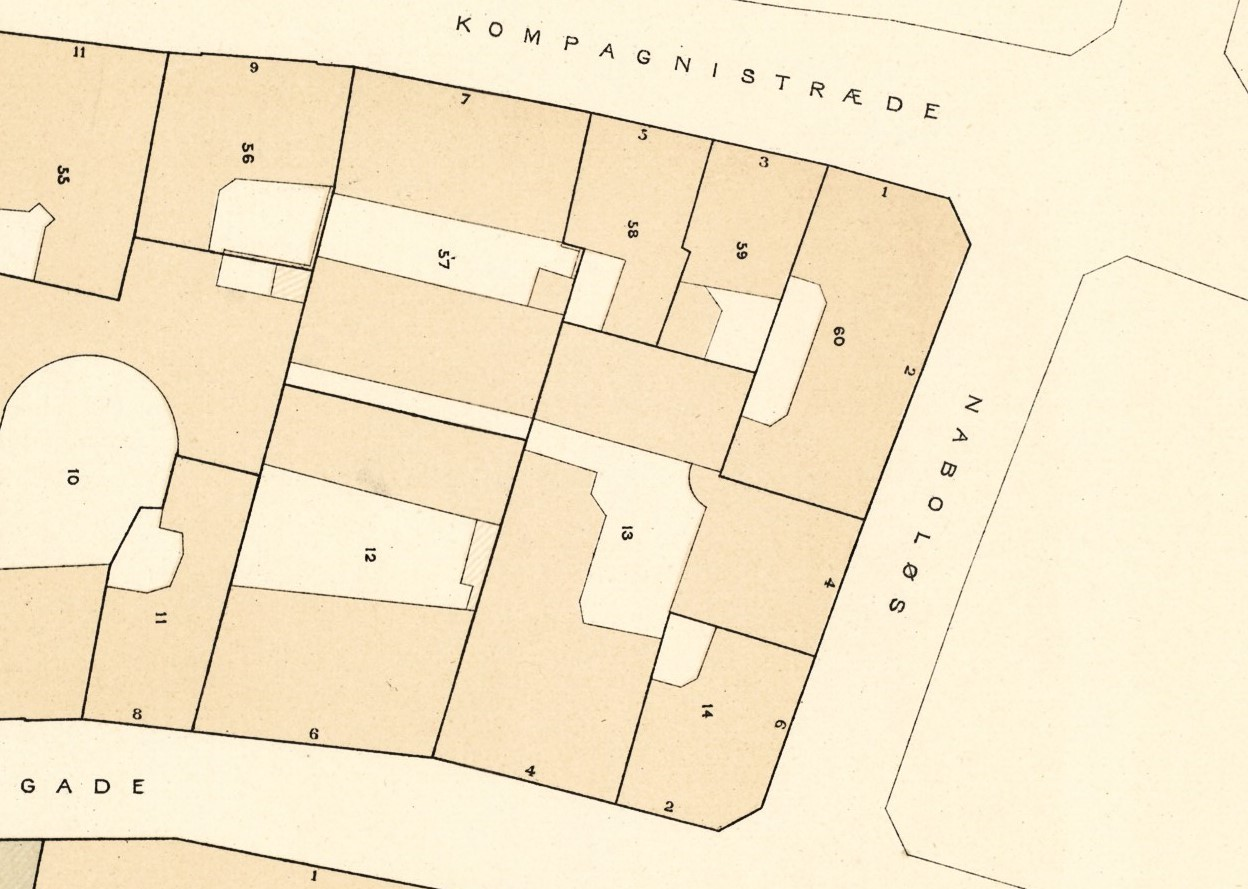
The property seen in a detail from Berggreen's cadastral map of Snaren's Quarter, 1884

Naboløs 20 was home to 38 residents at the time of the 1860 census. The most prominent resident was the classical philologist Oscar Siesbye. He lived there with his mother Esther Siesby and brother Anton Frederik Siesby. At the time of the 1880 census, No. 2 was home to a total of 26 residents. Carl Johan Nagel, a 33-year-old businessman (handelsagent), resided in one of the ground floor apartments with his wife Johanne Andrea Nagel (née Hansen). Johansine Frederikke Augusta Truelsen, a Class-Lottery collector, resided in the other ground floor apartment with his wife Johansine Frederikke Augusta Truelsen. Hanne Elise Emilie Petersen (née Andersen), a 41-year-old widow, resided on the first floor with her three children (aged 11 to 22), a 12-year-old foster son and one maid. Johannes Peter Appelgreen, a bookprinter, resided on the second floor with his wife Caroline Vilhelmine Appelgreen and their three children (aged 25 to 30). Johan Christian Svanekjær, a master building painter, resided on the second floor with his sisters Christiane Frederikke Emilie Svanekjær and Sophie Jensine Concordia Svanekjær. August Christian Hansen, a merchant (urtekræmmer), resided in the basement with the floor clerk Joachim Hannis Reith and one maid. Peder Daniel Christensen, a grocer (høker), resided in the basement with his wife Johanne Christensen (née Andersen), their two children (aged three and five) and one maid.

== Architecture ==
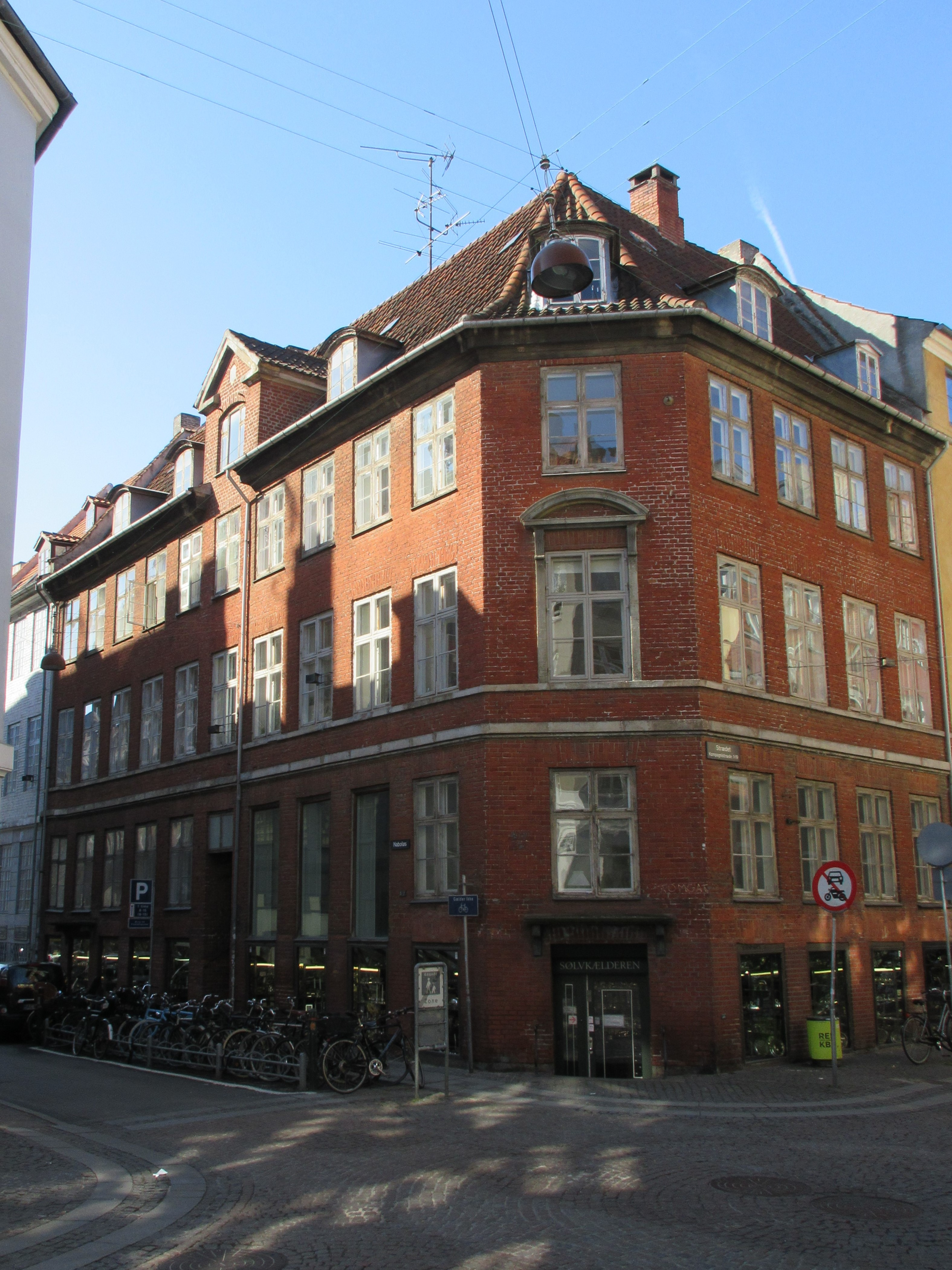
Naboløs 2

The building is constructed in brick with three storeys over a walk-out basement. It has a 10 bays long facade on Naboløs, a four bays long facade on Kompagnistræde and a one-bay chamfered corner. The latter was dictated for all corner buildings by Jørgen Henrich Rawert's and Peter Meyn's guidelines for the rebuilding of the city after the fire so that the fire department's long ladder companies could navigate the streets more easily. The undressed red brick facade is finished by a belt course above the ground floor, a sill course below the windows on the first floor and a cornice. The first floor corner window is framed in sandstone and tipped by a segmental pediment. The basement entrance in the corner is topped by a hood mould supported by corbels. The second basement window from the left (south) in Naboløs is topped by a similar hood mould. The facade on Naboløs is crowned by a single-bay gabled wall dormer which was originally the site of a pulley. A perpendicular side wing extends from the rear side of the building in Naboløs.

== Today ==
The building contains two condominiums on each floor and a retail space in the basement. It is jointly owned by the owners of the condominiums via E/F Naboløs 2.

== Gallery ==
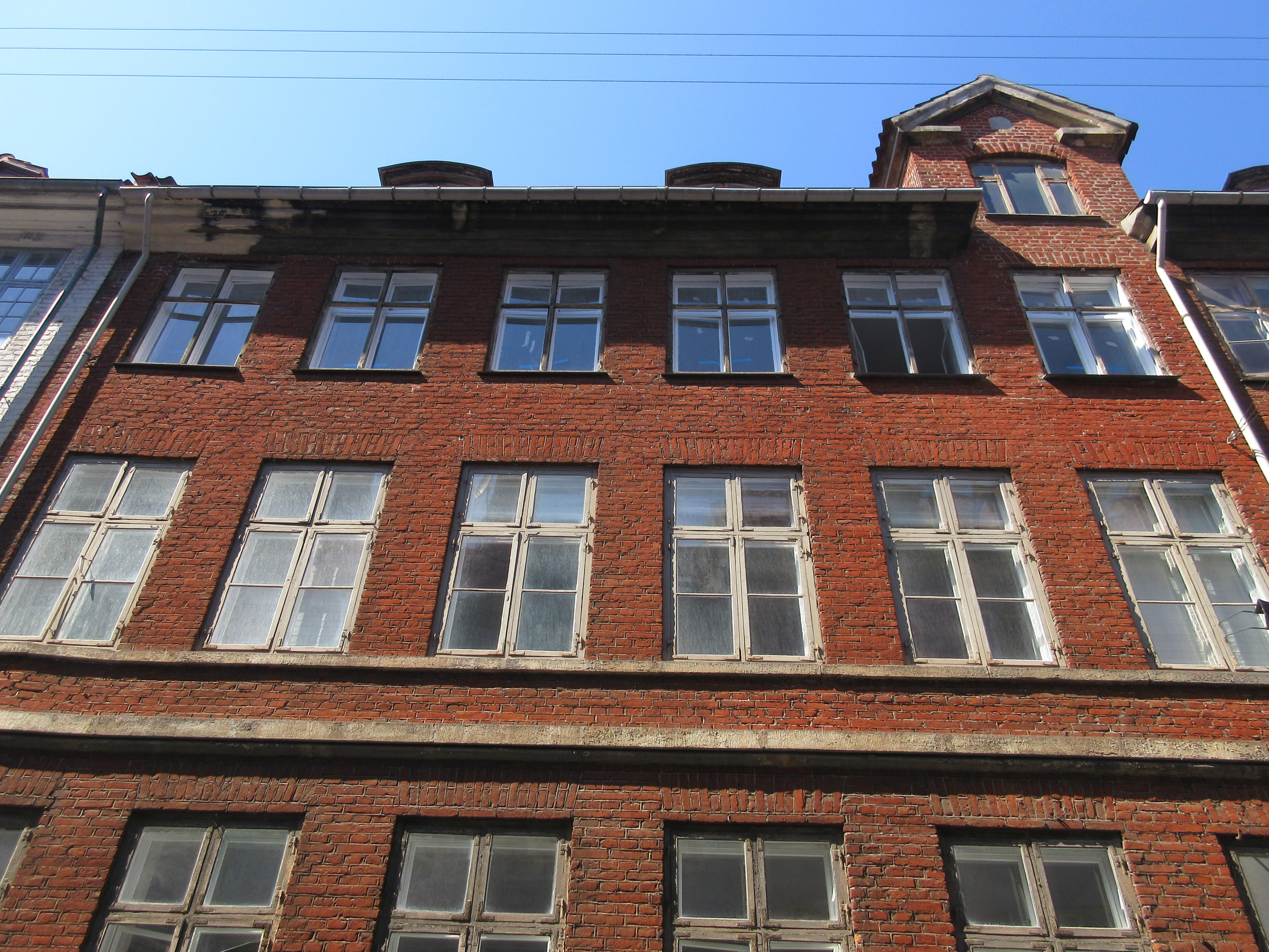
The facade on Naboløs

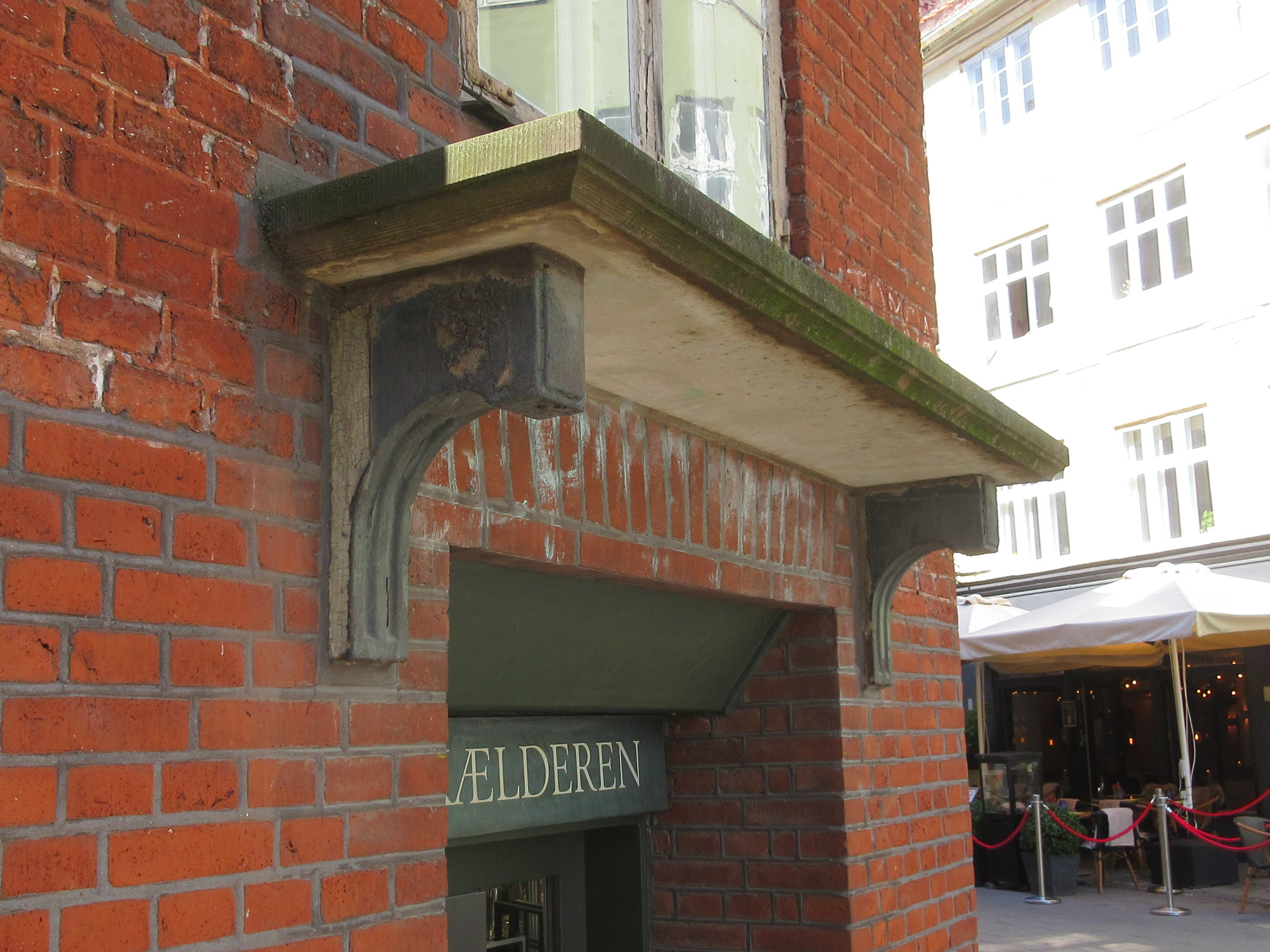
The hood mould above the basement entrance in the corner
