= Vestergade 14 =

Building in Copenhagen, Denmark

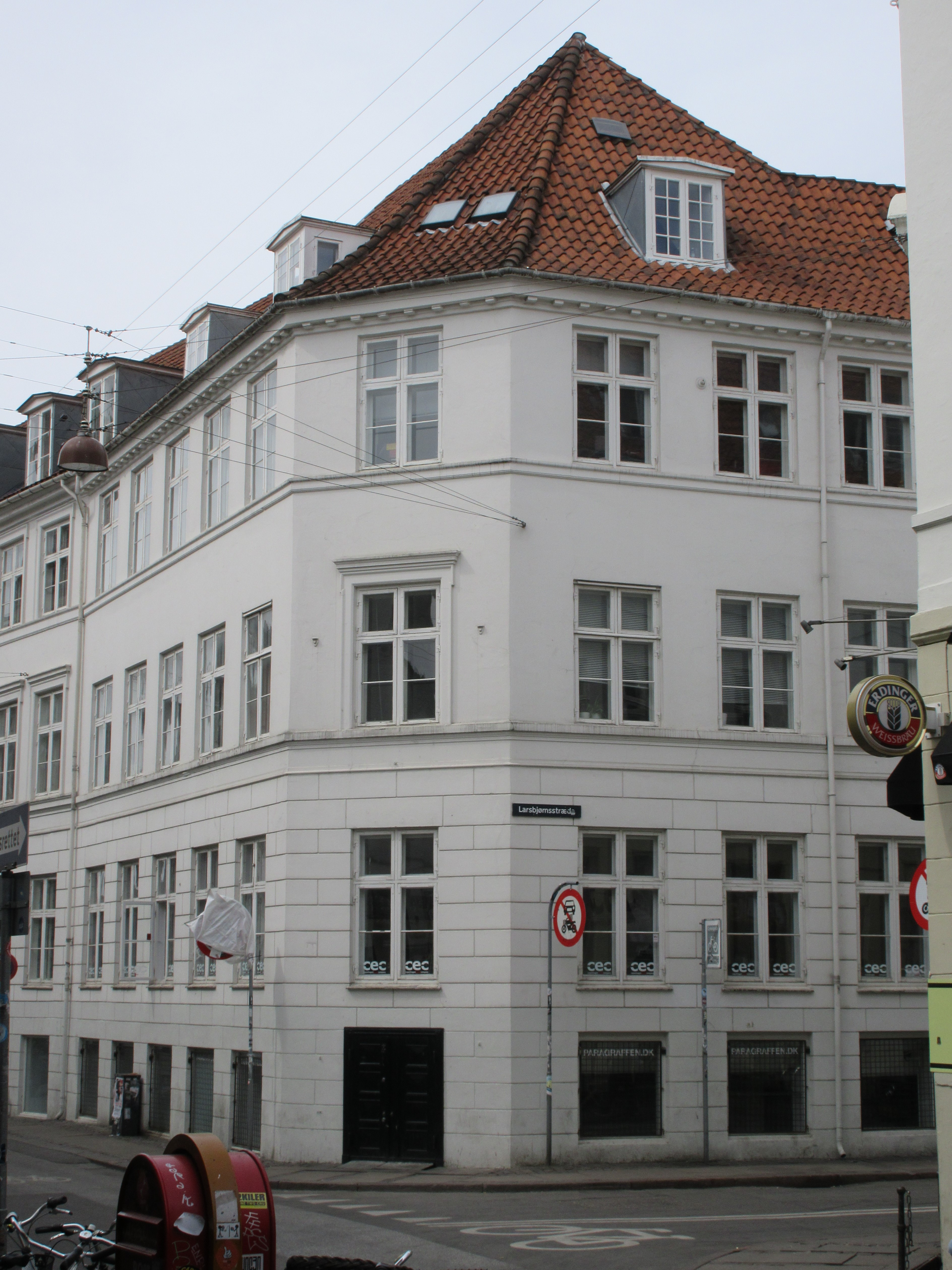
- Interactive map of the Vestergade 14 area

General information
- Location: Copenhagen, Denmark
- Coordinates: 55°40′39.91″N 12°34′11.26″E
- Renovated: 1797

Vestergade 14 is a property located at the corner of Vestergade and Larsbjørnsstræde in the Latin Quarter of Copenhagen, Denmark. No. 14 and the neighbouring building at No. 16 were jointly listed on the Danish registry of protected buildings and places in 1939.

== History ==
=== Before the fire of 1728 ===
Vestergade 14 was in 1388 part of a larger property owned by Herstedvester Church. The property was later divided into smaller lots, then merged and divided several times. Present day No. 14 consisted of two lots when the entire area was destroyed in the Copenhagen Fire of 1728. The (eastern) lot at the corner measured 6,25 metres towards Vestergade and 10 metres towards Larsbjørnsstræde. The western lot measured 7,50 metres towards Vestergade, 13.75 metres towards Larsbjørnsstræde and was 26 metres deep at its western boundary towards No. 16.

=== The eastern building, 1728-1795 ===
The lot at the corner had since 1705 been owned by the surgeon Johann von Aspern. He was hit by a stroke during the fire and suffered from paralysis until his death in 1735. His step son, Christian Friedrich Reiser, who was also a surgeon, was hit by a psychiatric disorder during the fire and spent the rest of his life in constant fear of fire. He wrote a detailed but naive and unintentionally comical account of the fire which was published in 1784. Johann von Aspern's wife, Cathrine Adelgunde von Aspern, continued her husband's surgical business. It was later continued by Christian Friedrich Reiser until 1755. He then moved to Vestergade 10 where he died in 1785. The corner building was owned by a distiller named Jensen when it was destroyed in the Copenhagen Fire of 1795.

=== The western building, 1728-1895 ===
The western lot was the site of a tannery owned by Gert Eriksen Quitzows. It was rebuilt after the Fire of 1728 and was operated by the Quitzows family until 1782. It was then home to two merchants and a chair-maker until it was destroyed in the Copenhagen Fire of 1805.

=== The new building ===
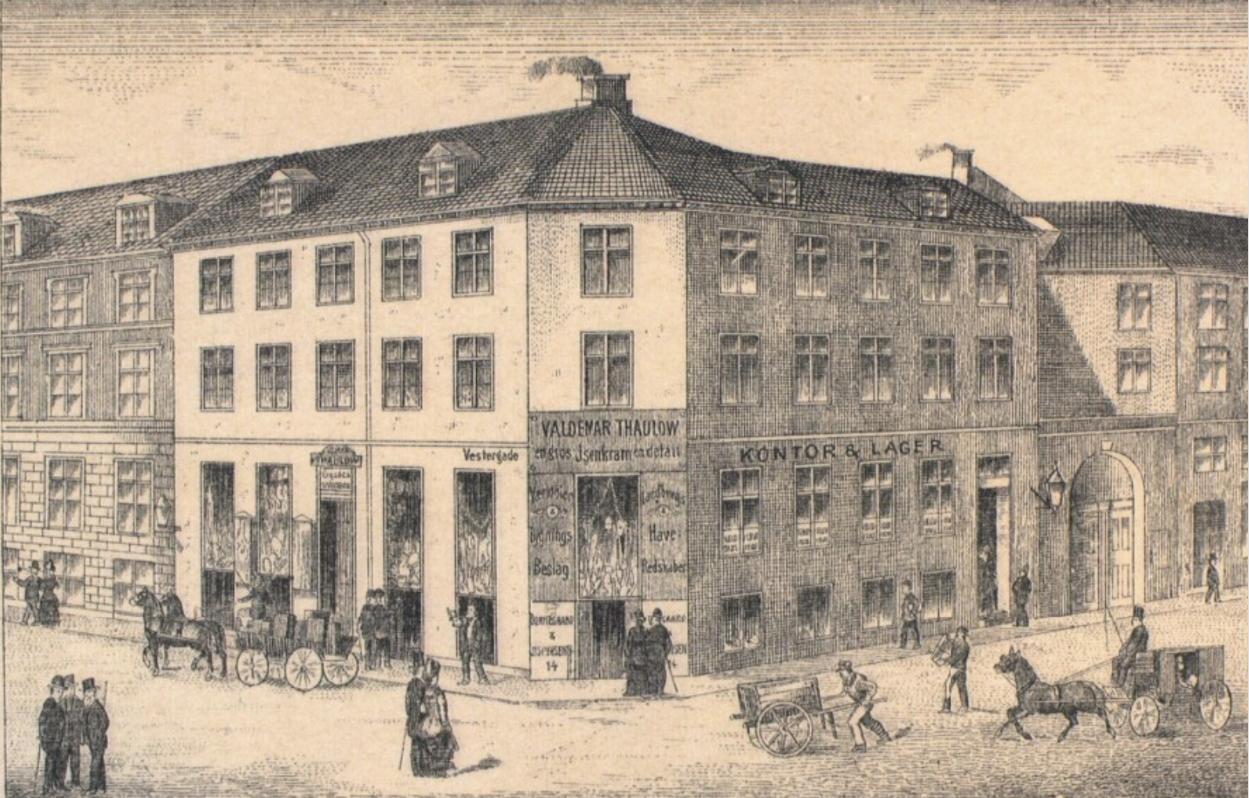
Valdemar Thaulow's hardware store

The two lots were then merged into one property by tobacco manufacturer Hans Bredahl. He commissioned Lauritz Thrane (1757–1809) to construct a new building in 1796–97. He both lived there and ran his business from the premises. The building was later taken over by his widow. One of her many tenants was Counter admiral Lorentz Fjelderup Lassen (1756–1837), known from the Battle of Copenhagen in 1801, who was a resident in the building from 1822 to 1824. Tage Algreen-Ussing (1797–1872), a jurist, was a resident in the building in 1827.

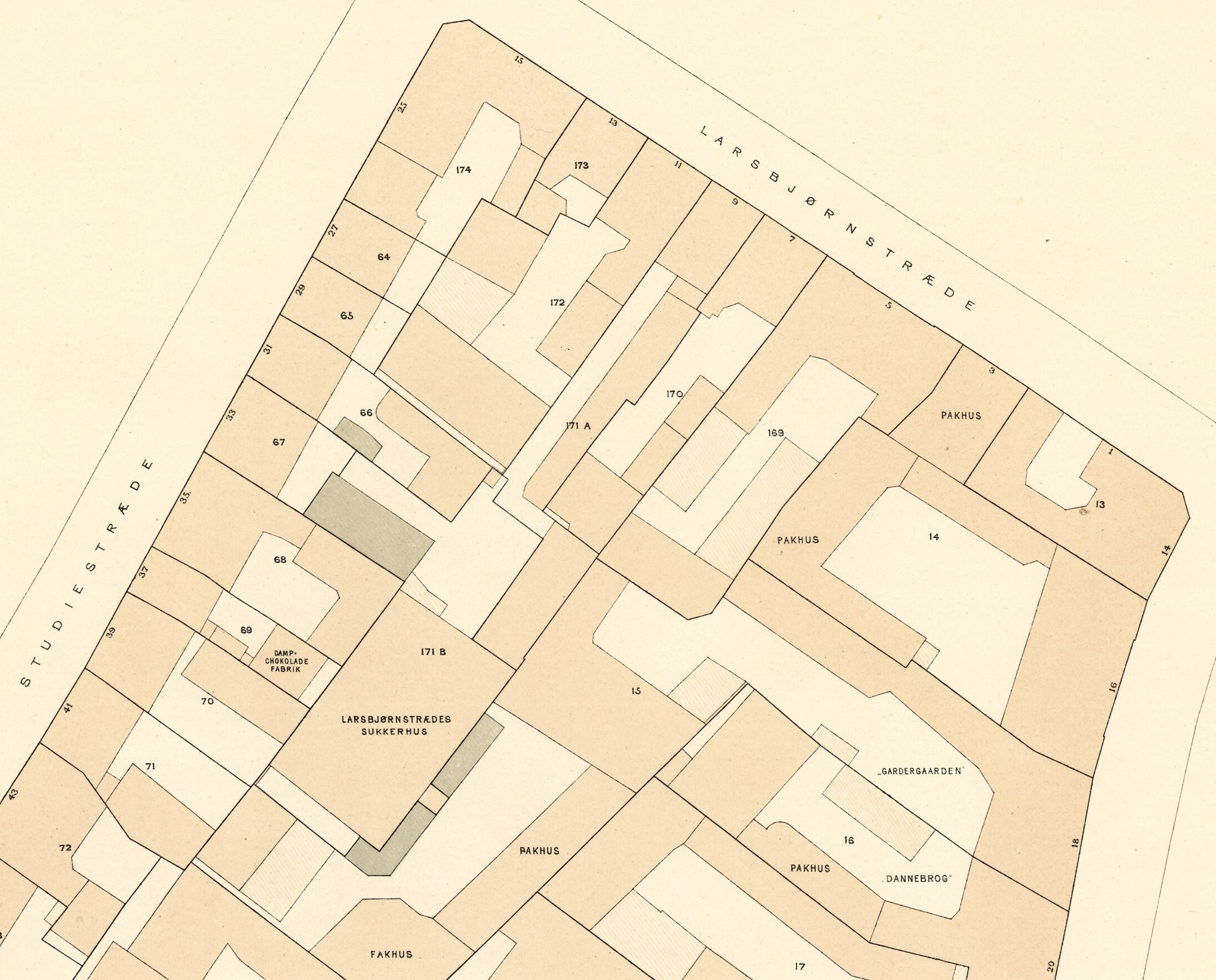
The property seen on a detail from one of Berggreen's block plans of Northern Quarter, 1886–88.

Another woman, Mrs. E. C. Gjestrup, acquired the building in circa 1830. She sold it to N. Christensen, a retired merchant, whose widow owned it until the early 1870s. Ludvig Colding (1815–1888), an engineer and physicist, was a tenant in the building from 1848 to 1962. He was appointed to city engineer of Copenhagen (stadsingeniør) in 1851. The naval officer and politician Otto H. Lütken (1813–1883) lived in the building from 1857.

The new owner, A. Black, a physicist, did not live in Copenhagen. The property then changed hans a couple of times before it was acquired by Lemvigh-Müller & Munch, a wholesaler of iron based at No. 16.

== Architecture ==
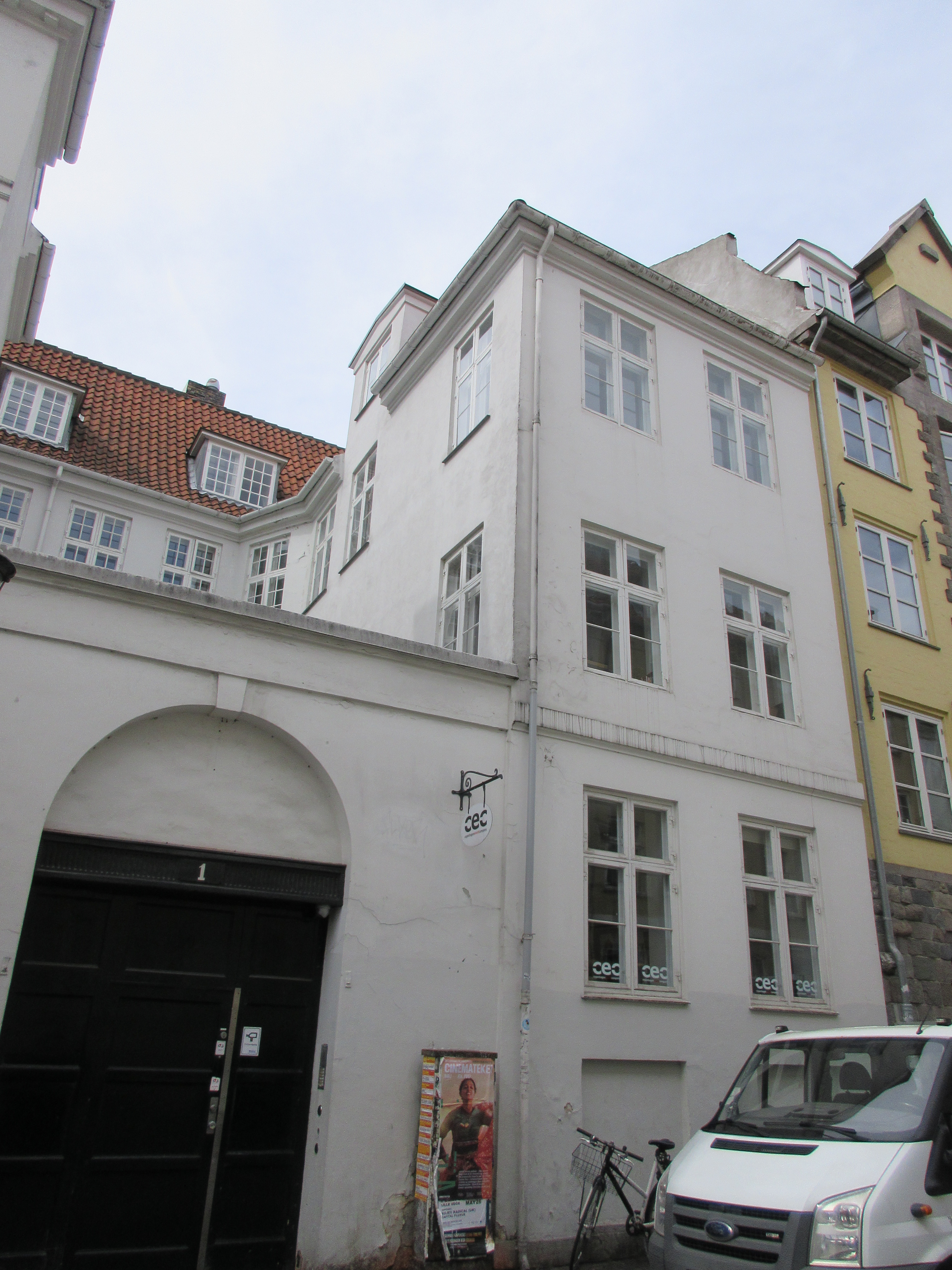
The rear wing and gate seen from Larsbjørnsstræde

No. 14 consists of five bays towards Vestergadem a chamfered corner bay and towards Larsbjørnsstræde. To then follows a wall with a gate that opens to a narrow courtyard.

To the rear of No. 14, on the other side of a narrow courtyard, is a four-bay building with a two-bay gable directly on Larsbjørnstræde. No. 14 and the gable of the rear wing are joined by a dressed wall with a gate on Larsbkørnstræde.
