= Brolæggerstræde 3 =

Listed building in Copenhagen

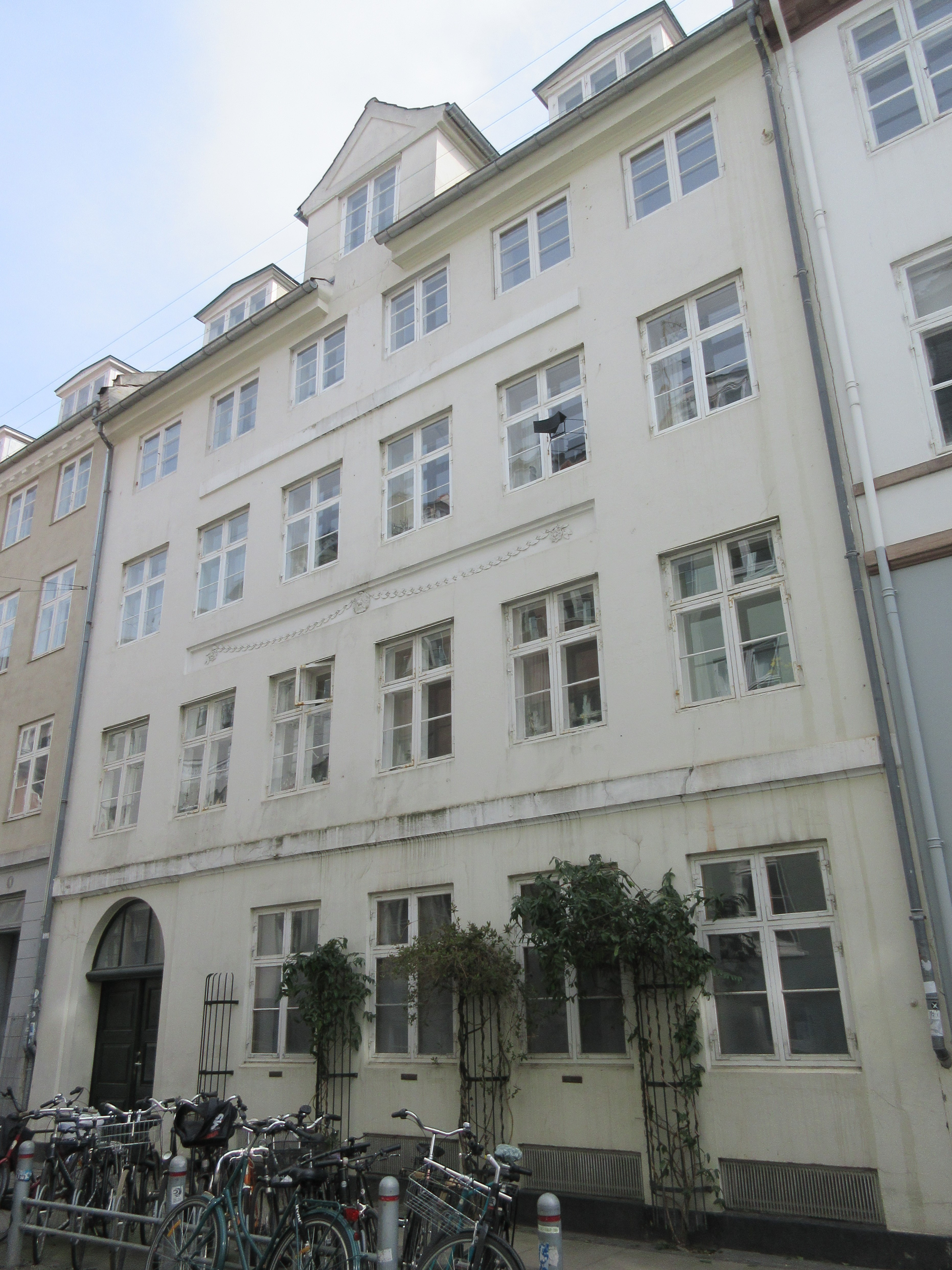
- Interactive map of the Brolæggerstræde 3 area

General information
- Location: Copenhagen. Denmark, Denmark
- Coordinates: 55°40′39.97″N 12°34′30.65″E
- Completed: 1796

Brolæggerstræde 3 is a Neoclassical buildings situated in the Old Town of Copenhagen, Denmark. It was like most of the other buildings in the street constructed as part of the rebuilding of the city following the Copenhagen Fire of 1795. A distillery was for the first many years operated in the courtyard. The property was listed in the Danish registry of protected buildings and places in 1945.

== History ==
=== 18th century ===
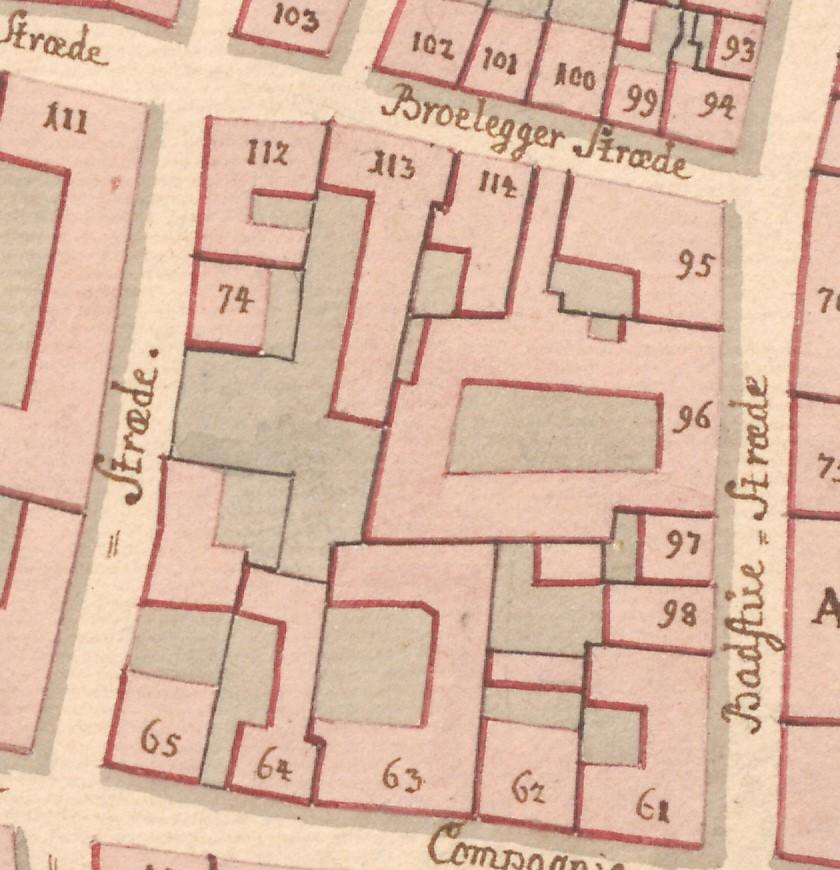
No. 114 seen on a detail from Christian Gedde's map of Snaren's Quarter, 1757.

The property was created after the Copenhagen Fire of 1728 with land from three separate properties as well as a piece of the street Endeløs. The three properties were listed in Copenhagen's first cadastre of 1689 as No. 65, No. 87 and No. 132 in Snaren's Quarter. The new property was listed in the new cadastre of 1756 as No. 114 in Snaren's Quarter. It belonged to Jens Rasmuss Lund at that time.

The property was later acquired by distiller Jeppe Hansen Lyngaard. His property was home to 26 residents five households at the 1787 census. The owner resided in the building with his wife Idea Helena Poulsen, their two-year-old daughter Mette Kirstine Lyngaard, a distillery worker, two maids and two lodgers (both students). Joseph Raphael (no profession mentioned) and Rose Una, a Jewish couple, resided in the building with their two daughters (aged 10 and 12) and two maids. Sophie Cantor (née Heiman), a widow in her 60s, resided in the building with four of her children (aged 21 to 26). Maar Rønne, a funeral coachman, resided in the building with his wife Anne Paiker, their two children (aged 10 and 11) and one lodger. Lars Rasmussen, a workman, resided in the building with his wife Sidse Bends Datter and one lodger.

The property was destroyed in the Copenhagen Fire of 1795, together with most of the other buildings in the area. The present building on the site was constructed in 1796 by master mason Lauritz Thrane for distiller Jeppe Hans Lijndgaard.

The property was home to 21 residents in four households at the 1801 census. Jeppe and Ida Lijndgaard resided in the building with their now three children (aged five to 15), one distillery worker and one maid. Michael Rodtschilt, a Jewish teacher, resided in the building with his wife Horle Meyerm their 15-year-old son Levin Rodtschilt and one maid. Pincus Hertz, a Jewish merchant, resided in the building with his wife Henriette Cantor and their two children (aged 16 and 21). Christine Rasch, a widow, resided in the building with her two daughters (aged 24 and 26), her sister Maren Rasch (Rask), one maid and one lodger (law student).

=== 19th century ===
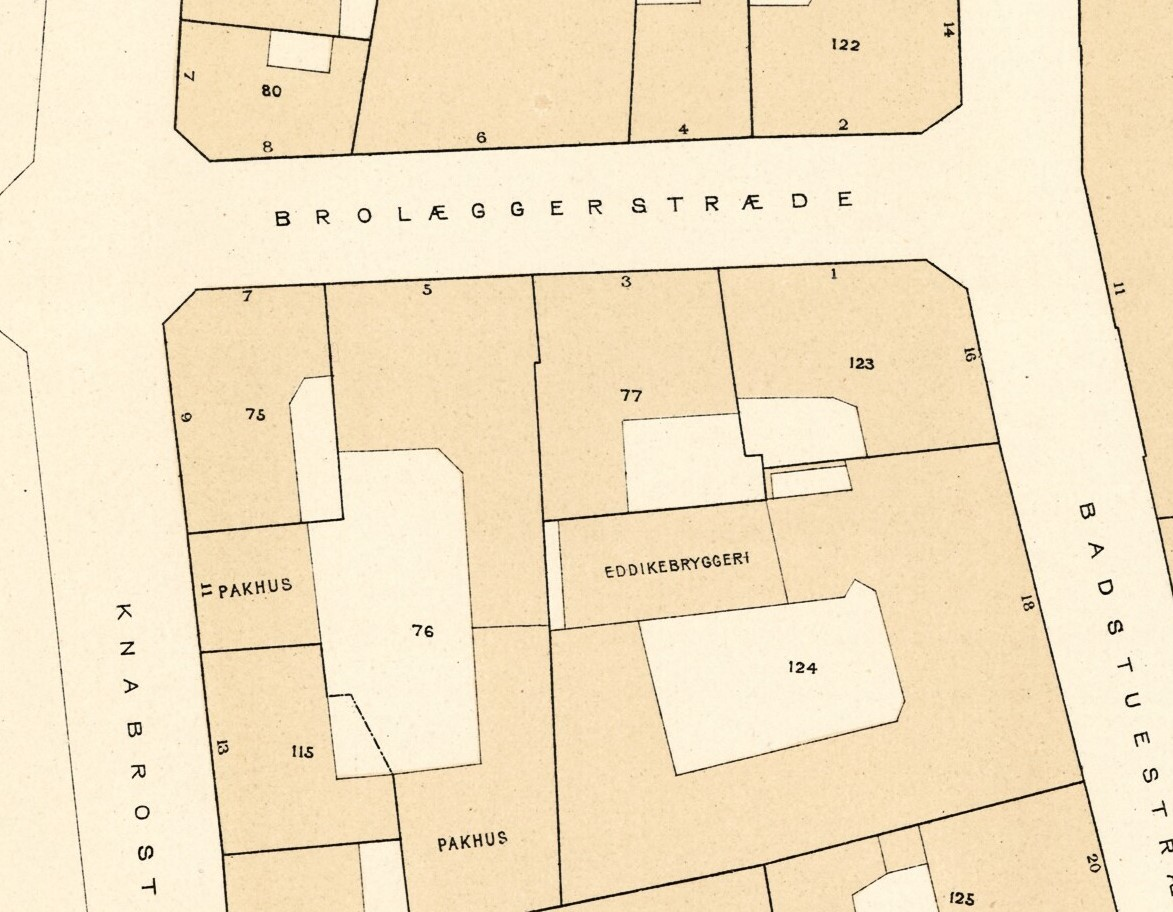
No. 77 seen on a detail from Berggreen's cadastral map of Snaren's Quarter, 1886.

The property was listed in the new cadastre of 1806 as No. 66 in Snaren's Quarter. It was owned by one R. Sørensen at that time.

The property was owned by the widow Ellen Kirstine Fodbye at the 1840 census. Her son Niels Rasmus Fodbye managed the distillery. Her property was home to 23 residents at the 1840 census. Ellen Kirstine Fodbye resided on the ground floor with her son Niels Rasmus Fodbye, her sister Karen Sophie Wunder, two male servants and one maid. Charlotte Amalia Bredberg, a widow, resided on the first floor with her son Hans Christian Ludvig Bredberg. Chatrine Marie Casparsen, another widow, resided on the second floor with her sister Marie Bolette Christine Busch and three lodgers. Peter Hansen, a master tailor, resided on the third floor with his wife Ane Gjertrud Hansen, their four children (aged six to 15), one maid, one tailor (employee), one tailor's apprentice and one lodger.

The property was home to 20 residents in three households at the 1850 census. Peter Hermann Hansen, a barkeeper, resided on the ground floor with his wife Wilhelmine Augusta Hansen (née Bloch), their 15-year-old son Ferdinand Hansen and his sister-in-law Lotte Margrethe Bloch. Levin Cohen, a master tailor, resided on the first floor with his wife Jette Cohen (née Meyer), their five-year-old daughter Hanne Cohen, his sister-in-law Rikke Feiere, 25-year-old Georgine Cohen, 34-year-old Wilhelmine Salomon (needlework), 72-year-old Henriette Friedlænder (needlework) and one maid. Helene Chatrine Fenger, a widow, resided on the second floor with her daughter Hertha Fenger, her sister Sara Hellesen, her granddaughter Betzy Olrik, one maid and the lodger Frederikke Bødtker (widow of an overkrigskommissær).

The property was home to 23 residents at the 1860 census. Lars Madsen, a new barkeeper, resided on the ground floor with his wife Cecilie Kirstine (née Petersen), their 24-year-old son Christian Waldemar Madsen, one male employee and one maid. Carl Frederik Rievers (1824-1890), a jurist in the Ministry of Financial Affairs, resided on the first floor with his wife Thora Nielsine Gaverstine Lützen, their four children (aged one to six), a female tutor and a maid. Isaac Gottcgalk Salomon, a book printer, resided on the second floor with his wife Sara (née Pethinger), their four daughters (aged 11 to 24). Christian Michael Ammentorp, a student, resided on the third floor. Carl Christan Jørgensen, a machinist, resided in the garret with the workman Mads Larsen and the workman's wife Mads Larsen.

=== 20th century ===
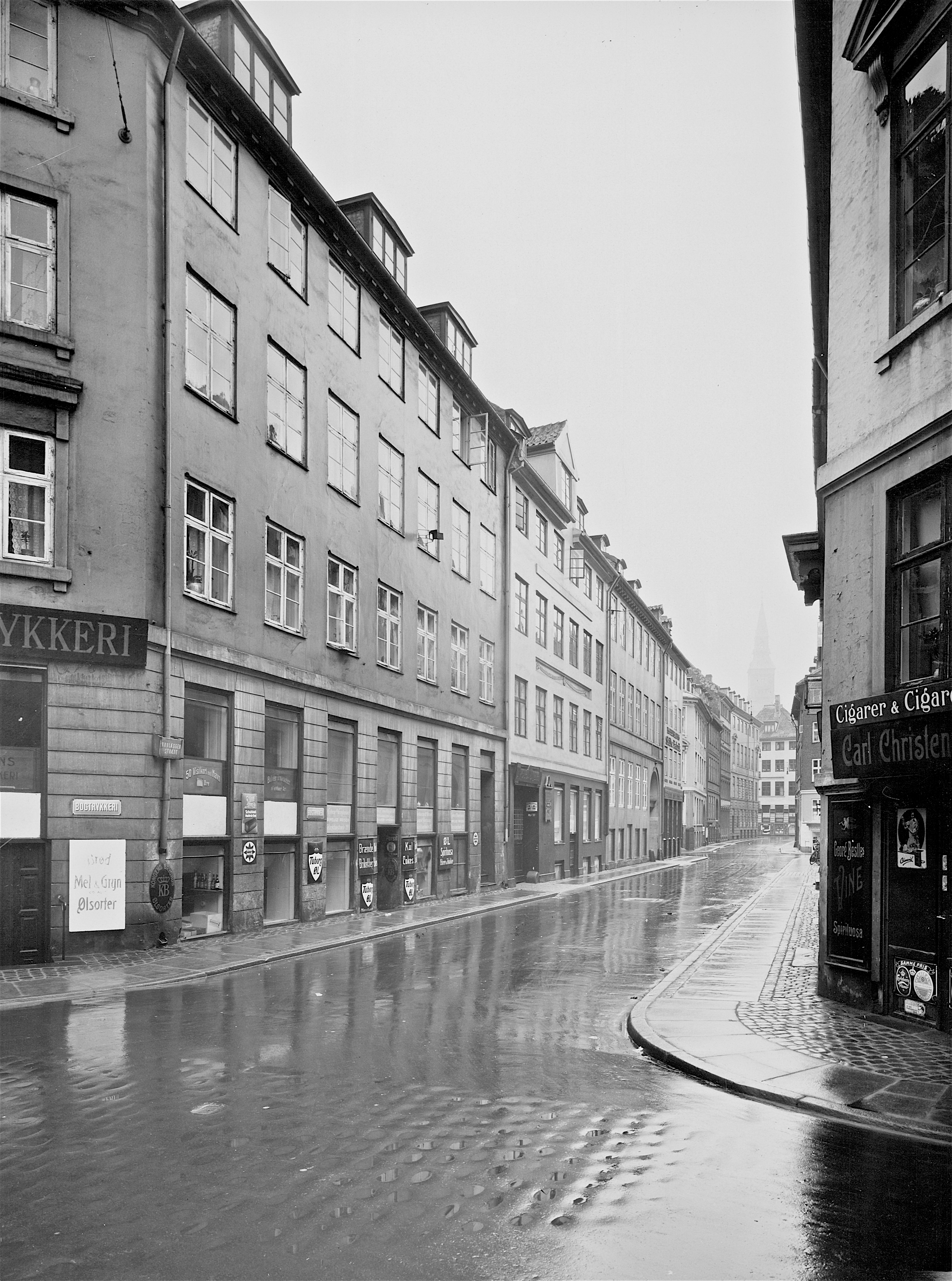
Brolæggerstræde 1-3

The property was after the turn of the century mostly used as office space and other commercial use. The property was thus only home to six residents at the 1906 census. Bertel Christian Jørgensen, an electrician, resided on the third floor with Bertel Christian Sørensen and Sørensen's wife Emilie Marie Petersen Munkeboe. Hans Peter Jakobsen, a shoemaker, resided on the fourth floor with his wife Agnes Marie Dagmar Jakobsen. Christiane Elizabeth Hein, a seamstress, was also resident on the four floor.

J. Skræm, James Vilh. Rode's Eftf, a book binding, was based in the building in 1950. Bathrooms were installed in the building in 1957.

== Architecture ==
The building is constructed with four storeys above a walk-out basement. The six-bays-wide facade is plastered and painted in a pale yellow colour. It is finished with a white-painted belt course above the ground floor, a stucco frieze with festoon and rosette ornamentation between the four central windows of the first and second floor, a blank frieze between the four central windows of the second and third floor and a white-painted cornice below the roof. A green-painted gate topped by an arched transom window is located in the two bays furthest to the left. The gateway was not created until 1993, expanding the original anteroom with one bay from the ground-floor apartment. Access to the principal staircase of the building is via an opening in the gateway. The pitched roof is clad in red tile. The gabled wall dormer that now crown the facade was not added until the 1800s. It is flanked by two dormer windows. The other side of the roof features two roof features two half-timbered window dormers. A short side wing extends from the rear side of the building.

== Today ==
The building is today owned by E/F Brolæggerstræde 3. It has a single condominium on each floor.
